= Staff Department of the People's Liberation Army Ground Force =

Chinese military command unit

- 中国人民解放军陆军参谋部
- PLA Emblem

Agency overview
- Formed: November 2015; 10 years ago
- Preceding agency: People's Liberation Army General Staff Department
- Type: Functional department of the People's Liberation Army Ground Force
- Jurisdiction: People's Liberation Army
- Headquarters: Beijing
- Agency executive: Lt Gen Li Zhonglin (李中林), Chief of Staff
- Parent department: PLAGF

The Staff Department of the People's Liberation Army Ground Force (中国人民解放军陆军参谋部) is a major functional office of the PLAGF in charge of the main staff work of the Service. It is a Theater Deputy-grade unit, and it is based in Beijing.

== History ==
The PLAGF General Staff Department was set up in December 2015 as part of the 2015 military reforms, in a bid to improve the staff direction and guidance.for unit construction. Its first chief of staff was Liu Zhenli (刘振立).

== Organization ==
- Operations Bureau (作战局)
- Training Bureau (训练局)
- Army Branches Bureau (兵种局)
- Army Aviation Bureau (航空兵局)
- Units Management Bureau (部队管理局)
- Planning and Organization Bureau (规划和编制局)
- Directly Subordinate Units Work Bureau (直属工作局)
- Cryptography Office (机要密码室)

== Leadership ==
=== Chiefs of Staff ===
1. Maj Gen Liu Zhenli (刘振立)（2016—2021）
2. Maj Gen Huang Ming (黄铭)（2021—2023 Jan）
3. Maj Gen Li Zhonglin (李中林)（2023 Feb—）

=== Deputy Chiefs of Staff ===
- Sr Col Zhang Mingcai (张明才)（2016—）
- Sr Col Yuan Jichang (袁继昌)（2016年—）
- Sr Col Zhu Qingsheng (祝庆生)（2016—）

=== Chief Assistants to CS ===
- Sr Col Han Qiang (韩强)（2016—2018）
- Sr Col Lu Zhuangang (鲁传刚)（2016—2020）
