= 127th Combined Arms Brigade =

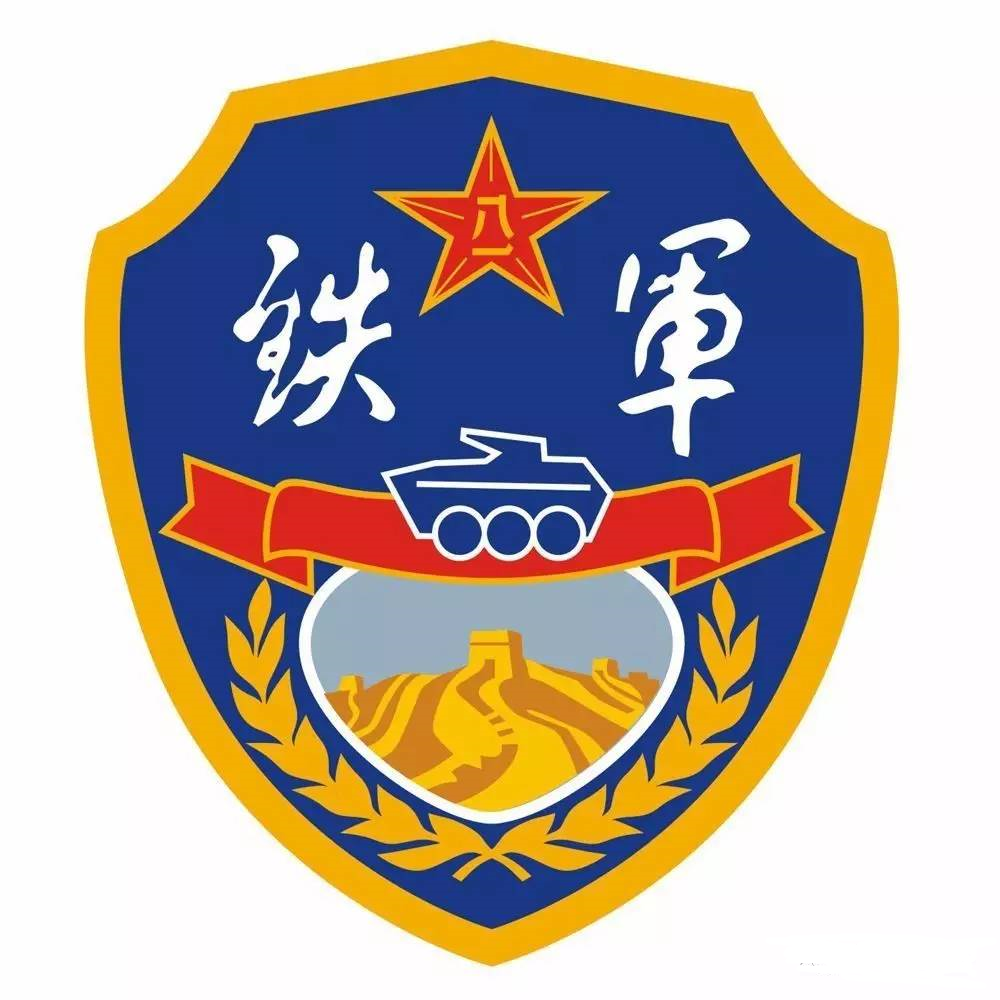
- Shield of The 127th Combined Arms Brigade "The Iron Army"
- Active: 1924—present
- Country: China
- Branch: People's Liberation Army Ground Force
- Type: Infantry
- Role: Combined arms operations
- Part of: 82nd Group Army
- Garrison/HQ: Handan, Hebei, Central Theater Command Ground Force
- Nickname: The Iron Army "鐵軍"
- Equipment: ZTL-11, ZBL-08, ZSL-92B

Commanders
- Notable commanders: Ye Ting, Zhou Enlai, Zhu De, Chen Yi, Lin Biao, Su Yu, Wang Kaixiang, Yang Chengwu, Yang Dezhi, Liang Xingchu, Zhang Wannian

The 127th Combined Arms Brigade is the primary maneuver element of the 82nd Group Army in the Central Theater Command of the Chinese People's Liberation Army and is its sole infantry division as of present.

== History ==
The 127th Combined Arms Brigade, formerly the 127th Mechanized Infantry Division, is one of the most famous and best-equipped PLA formations. Its three main regiments, the 371st, 379th, and 380th, are all Red Army Infantry Regiments. The 379th regiment is the famed Ye Ting independent regiment, a nationalist armored train unit that was once commanded by Dr Sun Yat-Sen, with Zhou Enlai as its political commissar, during the Northern Expedition. The 379th is also the regiment that formed the basis of the forces that fought KMT allies in the victory at the 1935 Battle of Luding Bridge. The "Iron Army" title was an honor for its Armored Train roots.
In 2017, the 380th Regiment of the 127th Mechanized Infantry Division(the Red 2nd Regiment of the Autumn Harvest Uprising) was split off and merged with the 9th Armored Brigade to form the 131st medium Combined Arms Brigade.

Before Nanchang Uprising

12 November 1924 - November 1925. As the Cantonese Nation Building Army (建国粤军), of Sun Yat-sen's Army and Navy Marshal stronghold of the Republic of China.
November 1925 - May 1926. As the 34th Regiment, 12th Division, 4th Army of the National Revolutionary Army under the First United Front and the Nationalist government(國民革命軍第四軍第十二師第三十四團).
May 1926 - November 1926. As the Ye Ting Independent Regiment of the 4th Army (國民革命軍第四軍葉挺獨立團).
November 1926 - 1 August 1927. As the 25th Division of the 4th Army(國民革命軍第四軍第二十五師).

After Nanchang Uprising

1 August 1927 - October 1927. As the 25th Division, 11th Army, National Revolutionary Army of the Left Kuomintang (國民革命軍第十一軍第二十五師).
October 1927 - January 1928. As the Fifth Column, National Revolutionary Army of the Left Kuomintang(國民革命軍第五縱隊).
January 1928 - 28 April 1928. As the 1st Division of the Chinese Workers' and Peasants' Revolutionary Army(中國工農革命軍第一師).
28 April 1928 - 25 May 1928. As the 4th Army of the Chinese Workers' and Peasants' Revolutionary Army(中國工農革命軍第四軍).
25 May 1928 - June 1933. As the 4th Army of the Chinese Workers' and Peasants' Red Army(中國工農紅軍第四軍).
June 1933 - August 1937. As the 2nd Division, 1st Corps of the Chinese Central Red Army(紅一方面軍第一軍團第二師).
August 1937 - October 1938. As the 685th Regiment, 343rd Brigade, 115th Division of the Eighth Route Army(八路軍第一一五師第三四三旅第六八五團).
October 1938 - August 1940. As the Jiangshu-Shandong-Henan Detachment of the Eighth Route Army(八路軍蘇魯豫支隊).
August 1940 - November 1940. As the 1st Detachment, 5th Column of the Eighth Route Army(八路軍第五縱隊第一支隊).
November 1940 - February 1941. As the 1st Training Brigade, 115th Division of the Eighth Route Army(八路軍第一一五師教導第一旅).
February 1941 - October 1946. As the 7th Brigade, 3rd Division of the New Fourth Army(新四軍第三師第七旅).
October 1946 - January 1948. As the 16th Division, 6th Column of the Northeast Democratic Alliance Army(東北民主聯軍第六縱隊第十六師).
January 1948 - November 1948. As the 16th Division, 6th Column of the Northeast Field Army(東北野戰軍第六縱隊第十六師).

After formation of the People's Liberation Army (PLA)

November 1948 - August 1961. As the 127th Division, 43rd Army Corps of the Chinese People's Liberation Army(中國人民解放軍第四十三軍第一二七師).
August 1961 - August 1968. As the Independent Division in the Guangzhou Military Region(廣州軍區獨立師).
August 1968 - April 1985. As the 127th Division of the 43rd Army Corps(陸軍第四十三軍第一二七師).
April 1985 - June 1997. As the 127th Infantry Division of the 54th Group Army(陸軍第五十四集團軍步兵第一二七師).
June 1997 - April 2017. As the 127th Mechanized Infantry Division of the 54th Group Army(陸軍第五十四集團軍機械化步兵第一二七師).
April 2017 - Now. As the 127th Combined Arms Brigade of the 82nd Group Army(陸軍第八十二集團軍合成第一二七旅).

== See also ==
- Republic of China Marine Corps, where the 77th Marine Brigade and the 99th Marine Brigade also claim a legacy with the NRA Fourth Army, with the nicknames "Iron Vanguard" (Chinese: 鐵衛) and "Iron Army/Iron Force" (Chinese: 鐵軍), respectively.
