= Ai Husheng =

Chinese general

- 艾虎生; Ai Hu-shêng
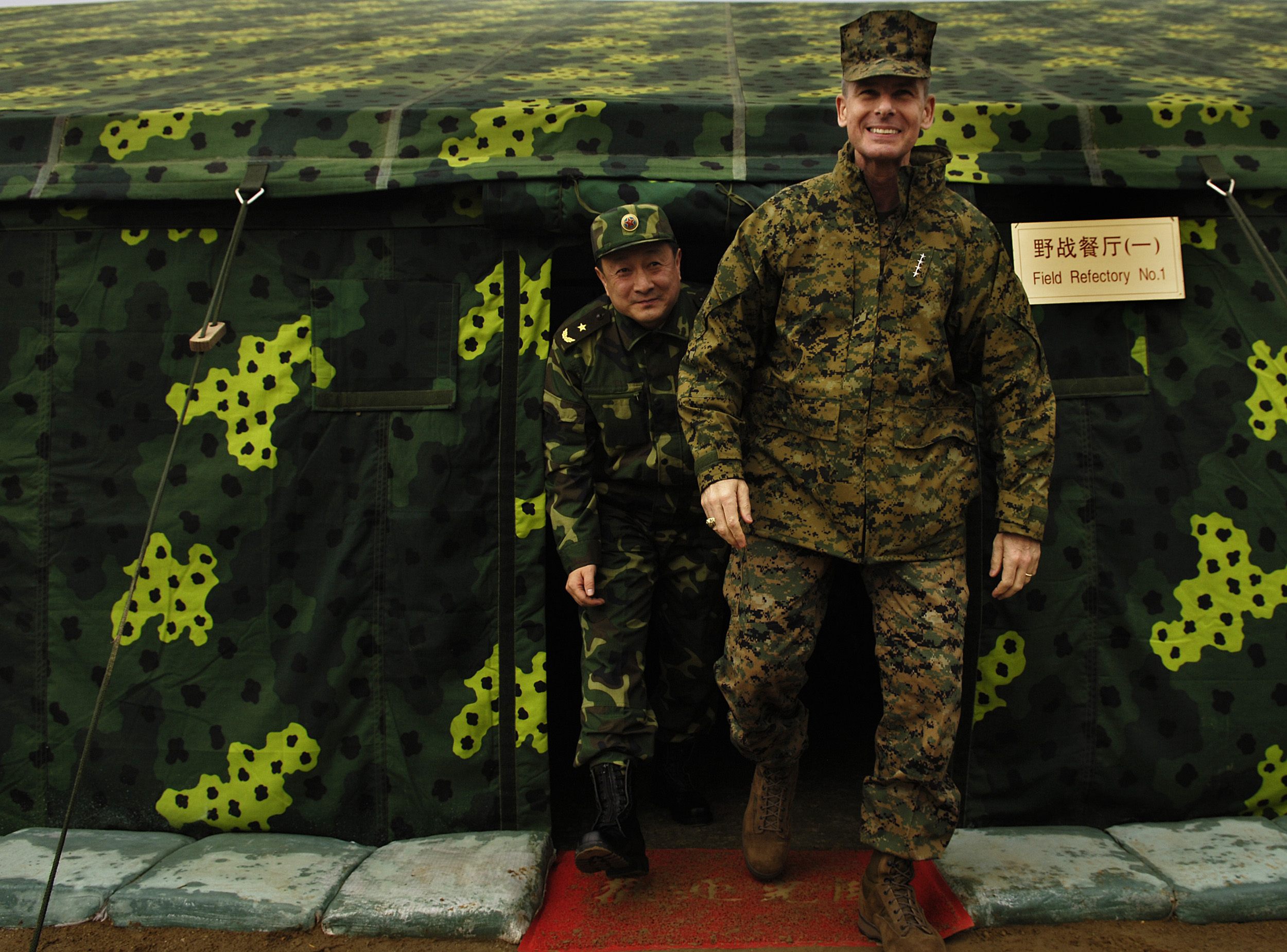
- Chairman of the Joint Chiefs of Staff U.S. Marine Gen. Peter Pace receives a briefing from People's Liberation Army Gen. Ai Husheng on different aspects of training and quality of life of his army's soldiers at Shenyang training base, China, March 24, 2007.

Deputy Commander of the Chengdu Military Region
- In office February 2012 – December 2014
- Commander: Li Zuocheng

Personal details
- Born: January 1951 (age 75)
- Party: Chinese Communist Party
- Education: Liaoning University

Military service
- Allegiance: China
- Branch/service: People's Liberation Army
- Years of service: 1967–2014
- Rank: Lieutenant General

Ai Husheng (Chinese: 艾虎生; born October 1951), also spelled as Ai Hu-shêng is a retired lieutenant general (zhong jiang) of the People's Liberation Army (PLA) of China. He served as Chief of Staff and Deputy Commander of the Chengdu Military Region.

== Biography ==
Ai Husheng was born in October 1951. His ancestral home is Yuzhou, Henan Province. He is the son of Ai Fulin (艾福林), former political commissar of the Shenyang Military Region artillery force. He enlisted in the PLA in March 1967. He holds a master's degree in history from Liaoning University.

Ai served for many years in the Shenyang Military Region, rising to commander of the 347th Regiment of the 116th Division of the 39th Group Army, later divisional commander and then chief of staff of the 39th Group Army (1999). In October 2002 he became commander of the 39th Army. In September 2007, he was transferred to the Chengdu Military Region to serve as chief of staff. In February 2012, he became deputy commander of the Chengdu MR. Ai Husheng retired from active service in December 2014, after reaching the mandatory retirement age of 63 for deputy military region level commanders. He was replaced by Lt. Gen. Zhou Xiaozhou.

Ai attained the rank of major general in 2002, and lieutenant general in July 2009. He was a member of the 10th National People's Congress. He has been an alternate of the 17th and the 18th Central Committee of the Chinese Communist Party.
