= People's Liberation Army 90th Anniversary Parade =

Military Parade to Celebrate the 90th Anniversary of the Founding of the Chinese People's Liberation Army 庆祝中国人民解放军建军90周年阅兵
- Genre: Military parade
- Date: 30 July 2017
- Locations: Zhurihe Training Base, Inner Mongolia, China
- General Secretary of the CCP: Xi Jinping (Note: CCP General Secretary Xi Jinping has also served as Chairman of the CCP Central Military Commission, the supreme commander of the armed forces since 2012.)

The military parade to celebrate the 90th anniversary of the founding of the Chinese People's Liberation Army was a military parade at Zhurihe Training Base in Inner Mongolia, on 1 August 2017 to celebrate the 90th anniversary of founding of the People's Liberation Army (PLA) and the Nanchang uprising that caused its founding.

The parade was the first one to be held outside of Beijing since 1981 and the only one to date to only include military equipment and no marchpast. It also was the first organized event to be held on 1 August, which is PLA Day in China.

== The parade ==
Central Military Commission (CMC) Chairman and Party General Secretary Xi Jinping inspected the troops while CMC vice chairman Fan Changlong was the parade's master of ceremonies and General Han Weiguo of the Central Theater Command was parade commander. 12,000 troops participated in the parade dressed up in combat garb instead of the usual Type 07 full dress uniform. According to the Minister of National Defense, this was done to replicate troops in a "dust-covered battlefield atmosphere".

A key cause for controversy was that during the parade when the flag of the Chinese Communist Party was paraded ahead of the flag of China. Voice of America pointed out that this violated Article 15 of the Law on the National Flag. Network commentators in China saw this an inappropriate move.
