= Shi Zhenglu =

Chinese army lieutenant general

- 石正露

Commander of the Northern Theater Command Ground Force
- Incumbent
- Assumed office December 2020
- Preceded by: Wu Yanan

Personal details
- Born: February 1963 (age 63) Daye County, Hubei, China
- Party: Chinese Communist Party

Military service
- Allegiance: People's Republic of China
- Branch/service: People's Liberation Army Ground Force
- Rank: Lieutenant general

Shi Zhenglu (Chinese: 石正露; pinyin: Shí Zhènglù; born February 1963) is a lieutenant general in the People's Liberation Army of China.

He was a representative of the 19th National Congress of the Chinese Communist Party. He was an alternate of the 19th Central Committee of the Chinese Communist Party and is an alternate of the 20th Central Committee of the Chinese Communist Party.

== Biography ==
Shi was born in the town of Dajipu, Daye County, Hubei, in February 1963. He served in the Jinan Military Region for a long time. In 2008, he led his troops to participate in disaster relief and rescue missions in Wenchuan earthquake stricken areas. He was promoted to chief of staff of the 54th Group Army (now 83rd Group Army) for his actions at the disaster relief and rescue missions. In November 2012, he became deputy commander of the army. He was deputy chief of staff of the Jinan Military Region in September 2014 and subsequently commander of the 54th Group Army in December 2014. He was appointed deputy commander of the Northern Theater Command in January 2017, concurrently serving as chief of staff. In December 2020, he was made commander of the Northern Theater Command Ground Force.

He was promoted to the rank of major general (shaojiang) in July 2010 and lieutenant general (zhongjiang) in July 2018.

Military offices
Preceded by Rong Guiqing	Commander of the 54th Group Army; 2014–2017	Succeeded by Xie Zenggang
Preceded by Wang Xixin	Chief of Staff of the Northern Theater Command; 2017–2020	Succeeded by Jiang Guoping
Preceded by Wu Yanan	Commander of the Northern Theater Command Ground Force; 2020–	Incumbent
