= Bi Jingjing =

Chinese general

- 毕京京

Vice President of the PLA National Defence University
- In office December 2012 – July 2017
- President: Wang Xibin; Song Puxuan; Zhang Shibo; Zheng He
- Preceded by: Wang Xixin
- Succeeded by: Xie Weikuan

Personal details
- Born: 1954 (age 71–72) Beijing, China
- Party: Chinese Communist Party

Military service
- Allegiance: People's Republic of China
- Branch/service: People's Liberation Army Ground Force
- Years of service: 1970–2017
- Rank: Lieutenant general

Chinese name
- Simplified Chinese: 毕京京
- Traditional Chinese: 畢京京
Transcriptions
Standard Mandarin
- Hanyu Pinyin: Bì Jīngjīng

Bi Jingjing (Chinese: 毕京京; born 1954) is a lieutenant general in the People's Liberation Army of China. He was a member of the 13th National Committee of the Chinese People's Political Consultative Conference.

== Biography ==
Bi was born in Beijing, in 1954, while his ancestral home in Huantai County, Shandong. At the end of 1968, during the Cultural Revolution, Bi, alongside Ren Zhiqiang and others, was sent to Yan'an County (now Yan'an), Shaanxi to do farm works as sent-down youth. At that time, he was only 14 years old, becoming the youngest sent-down youth in Yan'an County. He enlisted in the People's Liberation Army (PLA) in 1970 and mainly served in the PLA National Defence University. He was promoted to become its vice president in December 2012, and served until July 2017.

He was promoted to the rank of major general (shaojiang) in July 2005 and lieutenant general (zhongjiang) in July 2014.

== Publications ==
- 高举中国特色社会主义伟大旗帜 [Holding High the Great Banner of Socialism with Chinese Characteristics] (in Chinese). Beijing: People's Liberation Army Publishing House. 2007. ISBN 9787506555449.
- 中国特色社会主义论 [On Socialism with Chinese Characteristics] (in Chinese). Beijing: National Defense University Press. 2008. ISBN 9787562616931.
- 十七届六中全会·推动社会主义文化大发展大繁荣学习读本 [The Sixth Plenary Session of the 17th Central Committee of the Chinese Communist Party: Learning Book for Promoting the Great Development and Prosperity of Socialist Culture] (in Chinese). Beijing: People's Daily Press. 2011. ISBN 9787511506177.
- 东方风来20年：邓小平南方谈话的理论贡献 [The Last 20 Years of Winds from the East: Theoretical Contribution from the South Talk of Deng Xiaoping] (in Chinese). Beijing: People's Daily Press. 2012. ISBN 9787511508089.

Military offices
Preceded by Wang Xixin	Vice President of the PLA National Defence University; 2012–2017	Succeeded by Xie Weikuan
