= Wu Yanan (general) =

Chinese general (born 1962)

- 吴亚男

Commander of the Southern Theater Command
- Incumbent
- Assumed office July 2024
- Political Commissar: Wang Wenquan
- Preceded by: Wang Xiubin

Commander of the Central Theater Command
- In office January 2022 – January 2023
- Political Commissar: Xu Deqing
- Preceded by: Lin Xiangyang
- Succeeded by: Huang Ming

Personal details
- Born: August 1962 (age 64) Fuxin, Liaoning, China
- Party: Chinese Communist Party
- Education: Fuxin High School

Military service
- Allegiance: People's Republic of China
- Branch/service: People's Liberation Army Ground Force
- Years of service: 1980–present
- Rank: General

Chinese name
- Simplified Chinese: 吴亚男
- Traditional Chinese: 吳亞男
Transcriptions
Standard Mandarin
- Hanyu Pinyin: Wú Yànán

Wu Yanan (Chinese: 吴亚男; born August 1962) is a general (shangjiang) of the People's Liberation Army (PLA), currently serving as commander of the Southern Theater Command, in office since July 2024. He was commander of the Central Theater Command from January 2022 to January 2023. In January 2023, he was transferred to the Central Military Commission Joint Operations Command Center. He is a representative of the 19th National Congress of the Chinese Communist Party.

== Biography ==
Wu was born in Fuxin, Liaoning, in August 1962. After graduating from Fuxin High School in 1980, he enlisted in the People's Liberation Army in September of that same year. He joined the Chinese Communist Party (CCP) in September 1984. In July 2013, he was promoted to become deputy commander of the 16th Group Army, and held that office until March 2017, when he was promoted again to become commander of the 78th Group Army. In April 2020, he was commissioned as deputy commander of the Northern Theater Command and commander of its Northern Theater Command Ground Force. In December 2020, he took office as deputy chief of staff of the Joint Staff Department of the Central Military Commission, concurrently serving as deputy chief of the State Flood Control and Drought Relief Headquarters. In January 2022, he rose to become commander of the Central Theater Command, succeeding Lin Xiangyang. In July 2024, he became commander of the Southern Theater Command.

He was promoted to the rank of major general (shaojiang) in July 2014, lieutenant general (zhongjiang) in April 2020 and general (shangjiang) in January 2022.

Military offices
New title	Commander of the 78th Group Army; 2017–2020	Succeeded by Zhang Fan (张帆)
Preceded by Wang Yinfang	Commander of the Northern Theater Command Ground Force; 2020	Succeeded by Shi Zhenglu
Preceded by Lin Xiangyang	Commander of the Central Theater Command; 2022–2023	Succeeded by Huang Ming
Preceded by Wang Xiubin	Commander of the Southern Theater Command; 2024–present	Incumbent
