= Northern Theater Command Ground Force =

- 中国人民解放军北部战区陆军
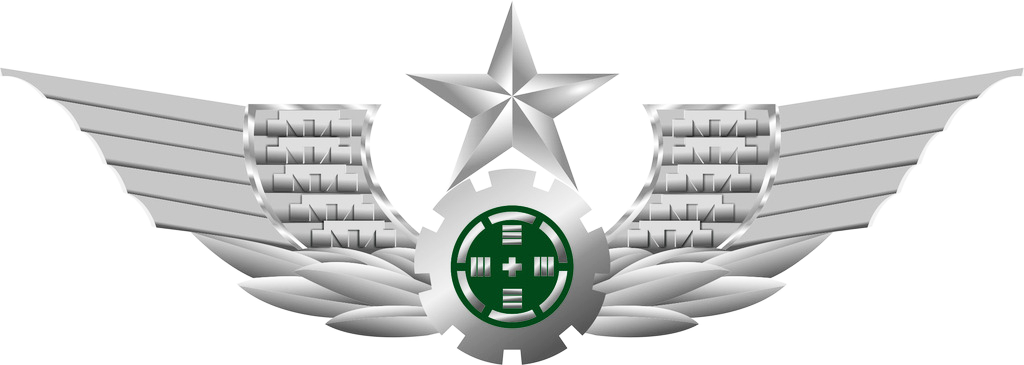
- Emblem of the People's Liberation Army Ground Force
- Active: 2016–present
- Country: People's Republic of China
- Allegiance: Chinese Communist Party
- Branch: People's Liberation Army Ground Force
- Part of: Northern Theater Command
- Garrison/HQ: Jinan, Shandong
- Mottos: 为人民服务 "Serve the People"
- Colors: Red and Green
- March: Military Anthem of the People's Liberation Army

Commanders
- Commander: General Shi Zhenglu
- Political Comissar: General Zhang Xiao

Northern Theater Command Ground Force
- Northern Theater Command
- Simplified Chinese: 中国人民解放军北部战区陆军
- Traditional Chinese: 中國人民解放軍北部戰區陸軍
Transcriptions
Standard Mandarin
- Hanyu Pinyin: Zhōngguó Rénmín Jiěfàngjūn Běibù Zhànqū Lùjūn

The Northern Theater Command Ground Force is the ground force under the Northern Theater Command. Its headquarters is in Jinan, Shandong. The current commander is Shi Zhenglu and the current political commissar is Zhang Xiao.

== History ==
The Northern Theater Command Ground Force was officially established on 31 December 2015 with the troops of former Jinan Military Region and Shenyang Military Region.

== Functional department ==
- General Staff
- Political Work Department
- Logistics Department
- Equipment department
- Disciplinary Inspection Committee

== Directly subordinate functional units ==
- Zhurihe Joint Tactic Training Base
- Taonan Joint Tactic Training Base
- 78th Group Army Hospital
- PLA Ground Force Third Comprehensive Training Base
- PLA Ground Force Eighth Comprehensive Training Base

== Directly subordinate combat units ==
=== Group army ===
- 78th Group Army (stationed in Harbin, Heilongjiang)
- 79th Group Army (stationed in Shenyang, Liaoning)
- 80th Group Army (stationed in Weifang, Shandong)

=== Units directly subordinate to Theater Army HQ ===
- Fourth Brigade of Reconnaissance Intelligence （偵察情報第4旅）
- Fourth Brigade of Information Support （信息保障第4旅）
- Fourth Brigade of Electronic Warfare （電子对抗第4旅）
- 321st Brigade of Border Defense（边防第321旅 - MUCD 32104）(stationed in Alxa League, Inner Mongolia)
- 322nd Brigade of Border Defense (边防第322旅 - MUCD 32105) (stationed in Baotou, Inner Mongolia)
- 323rd Brigade of Border Defense (边防第323旅 - MUCD 32106) (stationed in Xilingol League, Inner Mongolia)
- 324th Brigade of Border Defense (边防第324旅) (stationed in Hulunbuir and Arxan, Inner Mongolia)
- 325th Brigade of Border Defense (边防第325旅) (stationed in Manzhouli, Inner Mongolia)
- 326th Brigade of Border Defense （边防第326旅 - MUCD 32110）(stationed in Mohe and Heihe, Heilongjiang)
  - 326th Brigade Patrol Boat Group (326旅巡逻艇大队 - MUCD 32111)
- 327th Brigade of Border Defense（边防第327旅）(stationed in Hegang, Heilongjiang)
- 328th Brigade of Border Defense (边防第328旅) (stationed in Jidong County, Heilongjiang)
- 329th Brigade of Border Defense（边防第329旅）(stationed in Hunchun, Jilin)
- 330th Brigade of Border Defense（边防第330旅） (stationed in Baishan, Jilin)
- 331st Brigade of Coastal Defense 海防第331旅）(stationed in Dandong, Liaoning)
- 332nd Brigade of Coastal Defense（海防第332旅）(stationed in Dalian, Liaoning)
- 333rd Brigade of Coastal Defense（海防第333旅）(stationed in Yantai, Shandong)
- 334th Brigade of Coastal Defense（海防第334旅）(stationed in Weihai, Shandong)
- 335th Brigade of Coastal Defense（海防第335旅）(stationed in Qingdao and Rizhao, Shandong)

== List of leaders ==
=== Commanders ===
English name	Chinese name	Took office	Left office	Notes
Li Qiaoming	李桥铭	2016	August 2017	
Wang Yinfang	王印芳	December 2017	April 2020	
Wu Yanan	吴亚男	April 2020	December 2020	
Shi Zhenglu	石正露	December 2020	Incumbent	

=== Political commissars ===
English name	Chinese name	Took office	Left office	Notes
Xu Yuanlin	徐远林	2016	2016	
Shi Xiao	石晓	2016	December 2020	
Zheng Xuan	郑璇	December 2020	June 2023	
Zhang Xiao	张晓	September 2023	Incumbent	

=== Chiefs of staff ===
English name	Chinese name	Took office	Left office	Notes
Zheng Jiagai	郑家概	2016	September 2017	
