= Zhou Yibing =

People's Liberation Army general

- 周衣冰

Commander of the Beijing Military Region
- In office 1987–1990
- Preceded by: Qin Jiwei
- Succeeded by: Wang Chengbin

Chief of Staff of the Beijing Military Region
- In office December 1980 – June 1985
- Preceded by: Xu Xin
- Succeeded by: Zou Yuqi

Personal details
- Born: February 1922 Chao County, Anhui, China
- Died: 9 August 2017 (aged 95) Beijing, China
- Party: Chinese Communist Party
- Children: Zhou Xiaozhou
- Education: PLA Military Academy

Military service
- Allegiance: People's Republic of China
- Branch/service: People's Liberation Army Ground Force
- Years of service: 1939–1990
- Rank: Lieutenant general
- Battles/wars: Second Sino-Japanese War; Chinese Civil War; Korean War

Zhou Yibing (Chinese: 周衣冰; pinyin: Zhōu Yībīng; February 1922 – 9 August 2017) was a lieutenant general (zhongjiang) of the People's Liberation Army (PLA). He was a member of the 13th Central Committee of the Chinese Communist Party. He was a delegate to the 6th and 8th National People's Congress.

== Biography ==
Zhou was born Zhou Yubin (周余彬) in Chao County (now Chaohu), Anhui, in February 1922. He joined the Chinese Communist Party (CCP) in December 1938, and enlisted in the New Fourth Army in November 1939. During the Second Sino-Japanese War, he participated in the Battle of Jiepaiji (界牌集战役), Battle of Xieheiziweizi (谢黑头圩子战役), and Battle of Shezikou (射子口战役). At the beginning of the Chinese Civil War, he was deputy commander of an army of the Central China Fourth Army and party secretary of Zhongxin County. In 1948, he was commissioned as commander in chief of the Fourth Military Division of the Jianghuai Military Region and deputy chief of staff of the Headquarters of the Fourth Military Division, participating the Huaihai campaign.

After the establishment of the Communist State in 1950, he was appointed chief of staff of the 14th Garrison Brigade of the East China Military Region and soon chief of staff of the 71st Division of the 24th Group Army in 1951. In 1952, he entered the PLA Military Academy. In 1955, he was given the position of deputy commander of the First Division of the First Army of the People's Volunteer Army, serving on the frontier in various posts at the Korean War. As a result of his performance, he was promoted to commander in the following year.

In 1973, he became deputy chief of staff of the Beijing Military Region, rising to chief of staff in December 1980. He served as deputy commander of the Beijing Military Region in June 1985, and a year and a half later was promoted to the commander position. He attained the rank of lieutenant general (zhongjiang) in 1988. In 1989, he was in charge of directing the martial law operation in Beijing. He retired in 1990.

On 9 August 2017, he died of an illness in Beijing, at the age of 95.

== Personal life ==
His son Zhou Xiaozhou is also a lieutenant general (zhongjiang) of the People's Liberation Army (PLA).

Military offices
Preceded by Xu Xin	Chief of Staff of the Beijing Military Region; 1980–1985	Succeeded by Zou Yuqi
Preceded by Qin Jiwei	Commander of the Beijing Military Region; 1987–1990	Succeeded by Wang Chengbin
