= Fang Dianrong =

Retired lieutenant general from China

- 方殿荣

Commander of the Chengdu Military Region Air Force
- In office July 2003 – 2013
- Preceded by: Wang Chaoqun
- Succeeded by: Zhan Houshun

Personal details
- Born: 1949 (age 76–77) Muling, Heilongjiang, China
- Party: Chinese Communist Party
- Education: PLAAF No. 7 Aviator School

Military service
- Allegiance: China
- Branch/service: People's Liberation Army Air Force
- Years of service: 1966–2013
- Rank: Lieutenant General

Fang Dianrong (Chinese: 方殿荣; born 1949) is a retired lieutenant general (zhong jiang) of the People's Liberation Army Air Force (PLAAF) of China. He served as commander of the Chengdu Military Region Air Force and deputy commander of the Chengdu MR from 2003 to 2013.

== Biography ==
Fang Dianrong was born in Muling, Heilongjiang Province. He enlisted in the PLAAF in July 1966, and was trained at the PLAAF No. 7 Aviator School. Starting in 1969 he served as a fighter pilot in the 18th Fighter Division, and later rose to deputy commander of the 7th Corps, and commander of the 9th Corps. He was then promoted to chief of staff of the Chengdu Military Region Air Force (MRAF), and deputy commander. He attained the rank of major general in 1996. In July 2003, he became commander of the Chengdu MRAF and concurrently deputy commander of the Chengdu MR. A year later he was promoted to the rank of lieutenant general. He served in the positions until early 2013, when he was replaced by Zhan Houshun.
