= Commander of the People's Liberation Army Ground Force =

Commanding officer of Chinese land force

- 中国人民解放军陆军司令员 (Chinese)
- Flag of the People's Liberation Army Ground Force

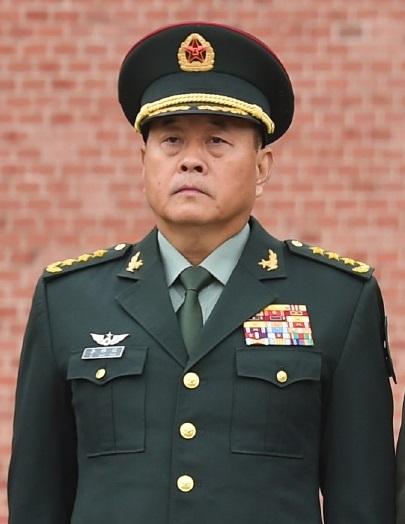
- Incumbent; Li Qiaoming since September 2022
- People's Liberation Army Ground Force
- Type: Commanding officer
- Reports to: Chief of the Joint Staff
- Appointer: Military Chairman
- Formation: January 2016; 10 years ago
- First holder: Li Zuocheng

The Commander of the People's Liberation Army Ground Force (Chinese: 中国人民解放军陆军司令员; pinyin: Zhōngguó rénmín jiěfàngjūn lùjūn sīlìng yuán) is the commanding officer of the People's Liberation Army Ground Force. The current commander is General Li Qiaoming.

== History ==
The position was created following the 2015 military reform, which brought about major changes to the PLA structure. Prior to the reform, leadership was split between four departments under the Central Military Commission (the General Political, the General Logistics, the General Armament, and the General Staff Departments).

== List of commanders ==
No.	Portrait	Name (born–died)	Term of office			Ref.
No.	Portrait	Name (born–died)	Took office	Left office	Time in office	Ref.
1		General; Li Zuocheng (born 1953)	1 January 2016	August 2017	1 year, 7 months	
2		General; Han Weiguo (born 1956)	August 2017	June 2021	3 years, 10 months	
3		General; Liu Zhenli (born 1964)	June 2021	September 2022	1 year, 3 months	
4		General; Li Qiaoming (born 1961)	September 2022	Incumbent	4 years	
