= Guiqing =

Guiqing (Chinese: 桂清 or 贵卿) is a Chinese given name. Notable people with the name include:

- Rong Guiqing (born 1958), Chinese major general
- Zhong Guiqing (born 1977), Chinese pole vaulter
