= Wang Chaoqun =

Chinese politician

- 汪超群

Deputy Commander of the PLA Air Force
- In office July 2003 – December 2005
- Commander: Qiao Qingchen

Commander of the Chengdu Military Region Air Force
- In office December 2000 – July 2003
- Preceded by: Huang Hengmei
- Succeeded by: Fang Dianrong

Personal details
- Born: November 1942 (age 83) Jiading, Shanghai, China
- Party: Chinese Communist Party
- Education: PLAAF No. 5 Aviator School; PLA National Defence University

Military service
- Allegiance: China
- Branch/service: People's Liberation Army Air Force
- Years of service: 1959–2005
- Rank: Lieutenant General

Wang Chaoqun (Chinese: 汪超群; born November 1942) is a retired lieutenant general (zhong jiang) of the People's Liberation Army Air Force (PLAAF) of China. He served as Deputy Commander of the PLAAF and Commander of the Chengdu Military Region Air Force.

== Biography ==
Wang Chaoqun was born in November 1942 in Jiading, Shanghai. He enlisted in the PLAAF in July 1959, and was trained at the PLAAF No. 5 Aviator School. He later graduated from the PLA National Defence University.

Wang was appointed chief of staff of the Beijing Military Region Air Force in October 1992, and deputy commander of the Beijing MRAF in December 1995. In December 2000, he was promoted to commander of the Chengdu Military Region Air Force and concurrently deputy commander of the Chengdu MR. In 2003, he was transferred to the PLAAF headquarters to serve as its deputy commander. In 2004, he participated in the first Sino-Russian joint military exercise. He retired from active service in December 2005.

Wang attained the rank of senior colonel in September 1988, major general in July 1993, and lieutenant general in July 2001. He was a member of the 10th and the 11th National People's Congress.
