= Huang Hengmei =

Chinese politician

- 黄恒美

Commander of the Chengdu Military Region Air Force
- In office December 1993 – December 2000
- Preceded by: Xie Decai
- Succeeded by: Wang Chaoqun

Commander of the Lanzhou Military Region Air Force
- In office December 2000 – December 2003
- Preceded by: Ma Xiaotian
- Succeeded by: Jia Yongsheng

Personal details
- Born: December 1940 (age 85) Shuyang, Jiangsu, China
- Party: Chinese Communist Party

Military service
- Allegiance: China
- Branch/service: People's Liberation Army Air Force
- Years of service: 1958–2003
- Rank: Lieutenant General

Huang Hengmei (Chinese: 黄恒美; born December 1940) is a retired lieutenant general (zhong jiang) of the People's Liberation Army Air Force (PLAAF) of China. He served as commander of the Chengdu Military Region Air Force and the Lanzhou Military Region Air Force.

== Biography ==
Huang was born in December 1940 in Shuyang, Jiangsu Province. He enlisted in the PLAAF in September 1958. He joined the Chinese Communist Party in December 1961.

He served in the 2nd Fighter Division in the Guangzhou Military Region Air Force, starting as a pilot and eventually rose to division commander. He became deputy commander of the PLAAF 7th Corps in May 1983, and commander of the Shanghai Forward Headquarters in May 1988. In January 1991 he was promoted to deputy commander of the Nanjing Military Region Air Force.

In December 1993, Huang was transferred and promoted again, to commander of the Chengdu Military Region Air Force, and concurrently deputy commander of the Chengdu MR. He served in the positions for seven years, before being transferred to the same positions in the Lanzhou Military Region. He retired in December 2003.

Huang attained the rank of major general in July 1990, and lieutenant general in July 1995. He was a member of the 8th National People's Congress.
