= Zhan Houshun =

- 战厚顺

Commander of the Chengdu Military Region Air Force
- Incumbent
- Assumed office 2013
- Preceded by: Fang Dianrong

Personal details
- Born: Heilongjiang, China
- Party: Chinese Communist Party

Military service
- Allegiance: China
- Branch/service: People's Liberation Army Air Force
- Years of service: ? – present
- Rank: Lieutenant General

Zhan Houshun (Chinese: 战厚顺) is a lieutenant general (zhong jiang) of the People's Liberation Army Air Force (PLAAF) of China. He served as commander of the Chengdu Military Region Air Force and deputy commander of the Chengdu MR from 2013 to 2016 when the Deepening National Defense and Military Reform of Xi Jinping abolished People's Liberation Army military regions and created theater commands. He was made the inaugural Western Theater Command Air Force commander when the Chengdu Military Region was amalgamated into the Western Theater Command of which he was made the deputy commander. He was succeeded by general Wang Qiang as the Western Theater's air commander.

Zhan Houshun was born in Heilongjiang Province. He served as commander of the PLAAF Changchun Forward Headquarters of the Shenyang Military Region, and was later transferred to the Chengdu Military Region Air Force (MRAF), where he served as chief of staff and deputy commander. In early 2013, he was promoted to commander of the Chengdu MRAF as well as deputy commander of the Chengdu MR, replacing Lieutenant General Fang Dianrong. Zhan attained the rank of lieutenant general on 16 July 2014.

In May 2014, Zhan Houshun oversaw the three-week-long joint Sino-Pakistani Shaheen-III Air Exercise.
