= Zhou Xiaozhou =

Zhou Xiaozhou, may refer to:

- Zhou Xiaozhou (politician)
- Zhou Xiaozhou (general)
