= Cao Qingfeng =

Chinese general

- 曹青锋

Deputy Chief of Staff of the Joint Staff Department of the Central Military Commission
- Incumbent
- Assumed office December 2023
- Chief of Staff: Liu Zhenli
- Preceded by: Zhang Zhenzhong

Personal details
- Born: 1966 (age 59–60) Poyang County, Jiangxi
- Party: Chinese Communist Party

Military service
- Allegiance: People's Republic of China
- Branch/service: People's Liberation Army Ground Force
- Years of service: ?-present
- Rank: Lieutenant General
- Unit: 31st Group Army Nanjing Military Region Eastern Theater Command Joint Staff Department of the Central Military Commission

Cao Qingfeng (Chinese: 曹青锋; born 1966) is a lieutenant general (zhongjiang) of the People's Liberation Army (PLA), currently serving as deputy chief of staff of the Joint Staff Department of the Central Military Commission. He is a delegate to the 20th National Congress of the Chinese Communist Party.

== Biography ==
Cao was born in Poyang County, Jiangxi, in 1966. He previously served as a regimental commander, chief of staff of a division and commander of a division that was formerly part of the Nanjing Military Region of the People's Liberation Army. After the military reform in 2016, Cao became the Director of the Eastern Theater Commands Operations Bureau. In 2022, Cao became Director of the Operations Bureau of the Central Military Commission. In December 2023, it was revealed that Cao Qingfeng was promoted to the deputy chief of staff of the Joint Staff Department. In April 2025, Cao Qingfeng visited Cambodia and met with Deputy Prime Minister and Minister of National Defense Tea Seiha where they exchanged views and deepened defense cooperation.

In December 2023, he was promoted to the rank of lieutenant general.

Military offices
Preceded by Zhang Zhenzhong	Deputy Chief of Staff of the Joint Staff Department of the Central Military Commission; 2023-present	Incumbent
