= PLA Day =

Chinese military holiday

- Traditional Chinese: 中國人民解放軍建軍紀念日
- Simplified Chinese: 中国人民解放军建军纪念日
- Literal meaning: Anniversary of the Founding of the Chinese People's Liberation Army
Transcriptions
Standard Mandarin
- Hanyu Pinyin: Zhōngguó rénmín jiěfàngjūn jiàn jūn jìniàn rì

PLA Day (Chinese: 中国人民解放军建军纪念日), also known as Army Day, is a professional military holiday celebrated annually by the People's Liberation Army (PLA), the military of China, on 1 August. It commemorates the founding of the PLA during the 1927 Nanchang uprising. Six years later, on 30 June 1933, the Chinese Communist Party (CCP)'s Central Committee for Military Revolutionary Cases voted to declare 1 August an annual holiday, being solidified later on 11 July by the government of the Chinese Soviet Republic.

== Traditions ==
Every year, the PLA Honour Guard marches on Tiananmen Square for a traditional Flag Raising Ceremony. The Central Military Band of the People's Liberation Army often gives holiday performances. Army Day is a working day, although soldiers have a shortened work schedule. The General Secretary of the Chinese Communist Party holds an annual meeting at the Great Hall of the People in Beijing. Events are hosted by the military attaches of China in foreign embassies such as the Chinese Embassy in Russia or Cambodia. Ceremonial events between the Indian Armed Forces and the PLA on PLA Day are traditionally held at the Border Personnel Meeting point. The first instance of this was in 2015.

== Military parades ==
Parades held on Army Day are not very common. In 2004, the first military parade held on PLA Day took place in Hong Kong to mark the PLA's 77th anniversary. The 3,000-strong parade saw the unprecedented attendance of anti-CCP lawmakers in the Legislative Council of Hong Kong at the parade. It began at 10:30 a.m. that morning with the performance of March of the Volunteers. The 2017 PLA Day Parade was a military parade held at Zhurihe Training Base in Inner Mongolia to celebrate the 90th anniversary of founding of the PLA. The parade was the first one to be held outside of Beijing since 1981, with 12,000 troops participating dressed up in combat garb instead of the usual Type 07 full dress uniform.

== Legacy of PLA Day ==
- The August 1st aerobatic display team is named after the founding day of the PLA and in turn, the day marking PLA Day.
- The Flag of the People's Liberation Army features the two Chinese characters "八一" ("8, 1") as a reference to the anniversary.

== See also ==
- Public holidays in China
