= Ding Sheng =

Ding Sheng may refer to:

- Ding Sheng (general) (1913–1999), Chinese general and Governor of Guangdong
- Ding Sheng (director) (born 1970), Chinese director
