= Xu Xin (general) =

People's Liberation Army general

- 徐信

Chief of Staff of the Beijing Military Region
- In office December 1970 – November 1980
- Preceded by: Ma Weihua
- Succeeded by: Zhou Yibing

Personal details
- Born: 16 March 1921 Lingshou County, Zhili, China
- Died: 18 November 2005 (aged 84) Beijing, China
- Party: Chinese Communist Party
- Education: Voroshilov Higher Military Academy

Military service
- Allegiance: People's Republic of China
- Branch/service: Eighth Route Army; People's Volunteer Army; People's Liberation Army Ground Force
- Years of service: 1937–1992
- Rank: General
- Battles/wars: Second Sino-Japanese War; Chinese Civil War; Korean War

Xu Xin (Chinese: 徐信; pinyin: Xú Xìn; 16 March 1921 – 18 November 2005) was a general (shangjiang) of the People's Liberation Army (PLA). He was an alternate member of the 12th Central Committee of the Chinese Communist Party. He was a representative of the 9th, 12th, 13th, and 14th National Congress of the Chinese Communist Party. He was a delegate to the 4th and 5th National People's Congress.

== Biography ==
Xu was born in Lingshou County, Zhili (now Hebei), on 16 March 1921.

He enlisted in the Eighth Route Army in September 1937, and joined the Chinese Communist Party (CCP) in November of that same year. During the Second Sino-Japanese War, he served in the Shanxi-Chahar-Hebei Military Region and mainly fought with the Imperial Japanese Army in Hebei province. During the Chinese Civil War, he served in the war and engaged in the Battle of Qingfengdian, Battle of Shijiazhuang, Pingjin campaign, Battle of Taiyuan, and Battle of Ningxia. In 1951, he was assigned the 63rd Group Army and participated in the Korean War. Xu returned to China in 1953 and was sent to study at the Voroshilov Higher Military Academy in the following year. After graduating in 1957, he taught at the PLA Higher Military Academy. He was commander of the 66th Group Army in 1962, and held that office until December 1970, when he was promoted to become chief of staff of the Beijing Military Region. In 1980, he was transferred to the People's Liberation Army General Staff Department, where he was assistant chief of general staff in November 1980 and deputy chief of general staff in December 1982. In 1987, he became a member of the Advisory Committee of the Central Committee of the Chinese Communist Party, serving in the post until his retirement in 1992. He also succeeded Wu Xiuquan as chairman of the China Institute for International Strategic Studies (CIISS).

On 18 November 2005, he died in Beijing, at the age of 84.

He was promoted to the rank of major general (shaojiang) in 1964 and general (shangjiang) in 1988.

Military offices
Preceded by Ma Weihua	Chief of Staff of the Beijing Military Region; 1970–1980	Succeeded by Zhou Yibing
