= Shiming (disambiguation) =

Shiming is a Chinese dictionary that employed phonological glosses, believed to date from c. 200 [CE].

Shiming may refer to:

- Li Shiming (disambiguation), multiple people
- Zou Shiming, Chinese professional boxer
