= Qin Weijiang =

Chinese general

- 秦卫江

Commander of the Eastern Theater Command Ground Force
- In office January 2016 – December 2018
- Preceded by: New title
- Succeeded by: Xu Qiling

Commander of the 27th Group Army
- In office December 2006 – December 2010
- Preceded by: Wang Xibin
- Succeeded by: Xue Aiguo

Personal details
- Born: December 1955 (age 70) Hong'an County, Hubei, China
- Party: Chinese Communist Party
- Relations: Qin Tian; Qin Wanjiang
- Parent(s): Qin Jiwei; Tang Xianmei
- Education: PLA Ground Force Engineering University; PLA National Defence University; University of Chinese Academy of Sciences

Military service
- Allegiance: People's Republic of China
- Branch/service: People's Liberation Army Ground Force
- Rank: Lieutenant general

Chinese name
- Traditional Chinese: 秦衛江
- Simplified Chinese: 秦卫江
Transcriptions
Standard Mandarin
- Hanyu Pinyin: Qín Wèijiāng

Qin Weijiang (Chinese: 秦卫江; born December 1955) is a retired lieutenant general (zhongjiang) of the People's Liberation Army (PLA) who served as Commander of the Eastern Theater Command Ground Force between January 2016 and December 2018. Prior to that, he was Deputy Commander of the Nanjing Military Region from December 2010 to January 2016. He was promoted to the rank of major general (shaojiang) in 2000 and lieutenant general (zhongjiang) in 2012.

== Early life and education ==
Qin was born in Hong'an County, Hubei in December 1955, to Qin Jiwei, a general and former Minister of National Defense, and Tang Xianmei. His brother Qin Tian is a lieutenant general of the People's Armed Police (PAP). His sister Qin Wanjiang is a businesswoman who was married to Yang Dongming, son of General Yang Chengwu.

After the resumption of college entrance examination, he was accepted to PLA Ground Force Engineering University, where he earned his Bachelor of Engineering degree in 1982. He obtained a master's degree of military science from PLA National Defence University in 2002 and a Doctor of Management degree from the University of Chinese Academy of Sciences in 2011, respectively.

== Career ==
Qin served in the 81st Group Army for a long time before serving as Deputy Chief of Staff of the Beijing Military Region in July 2005. He was Commander of the 27th Group Army in 2006, and held that office until 2010. In December 2010 he was appointed Deputy Commander of the Nanjing Military Region, and served until January 2016. He rose to become Commander of the Eastern Theater Command Ground Force in January 2016, serving in the post until he retirement in December 2018.

He was a member of the 13th National Committee of the Chinese People's Political Consultative Conference.

Military offices
Preceded by Wang Xibin	Commander of the 27th Group Army; 2005–2010	Succeeded by Xue Aiguo (薛爱国)
New title	Commander of the Eastern Theater Command Ground Force; 2016–2018	Succeeded by Xu Qiling
