= Li Shiming =

Chinese general

- 李世明

Commander of Chengdu Military Region
- In office September 2007 – August 2013
- Preceded by: Wang Jianmin
- Succeeded by: Li Zuocheng

Personal details
- Born: December 1948 (age 77) Santai County, Sichuan, China
- Party: Chinese Communist Party

Military service
- Allegiance: China
- Branch/service: People's Liberation Army
- Years of service: 1968−2013
- Rank: General

Li Shiming (Chinese: 李世明; born December 1948) is a retired general (shang jiang) of the People's Liberation Army (PLA) of China. He served as commander of the Chengdu Military Region.

== Biography ==
Born in Santai County, Sichuan Province, he joined the PLA in April 1968, and the Chinese Communist Party in December of the same year. In December 2006, he was appointed vice commander of the PLA Chengdu Military Region. In September 2007, he was promoted to commander of the Chengdu Military Region. He retired in 2013 and Li Zuocheng succeeded him as commander of the Chengdu MR.

He attained the rank of lieutenant general in 2005, promoted to general in 2011, and was a full member of the 17th Central Committee of the Chinese Communist Party (2007−12).
