= Qin Jiwei =

Chinese general and politician

- 秦基偉
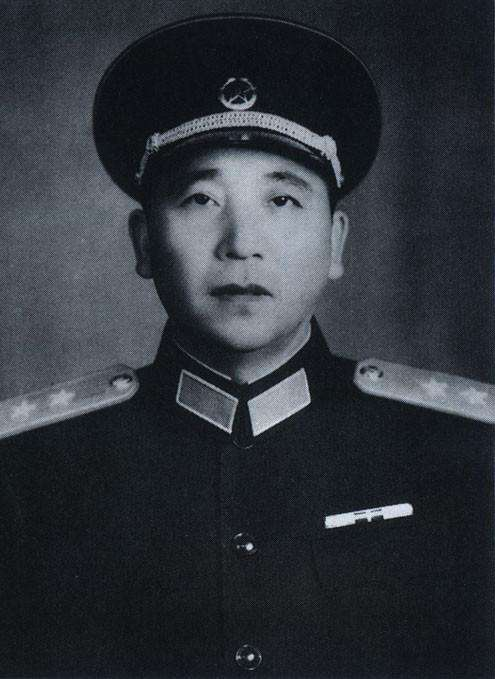
- Qin Jiwei in 1955

State Councilor of China
- In office 12 April 1988 – 29 March 1993
- Premier: Li Peng

Minister of National Defense
- In office 12 April 1988 – 29 March 1993
- Premier: Li Peng
- Preceded by: Zhang Aiping
- Succeeded by: Chi Haotian

Political Commissar of the Beijing Military Region
- In office September 1977 – January 1980
- Preceded by: Liu Zihou
- Succeeded by: Yuan Shengping

Commander of the Chengdu Military Region
- In office 1973 – October 1975
- Preceded by: Liang Xingchu
- Succeeded by: Liu Xingyuan

Personal details
- Born: 16 November 1914 Hong'an County, Hubei, China
- Died: 2 February 1997 (aged 82) Beijing, China
- Party: Chinese Communist Party
- Children: Qin Weijiang; Qin Tian

Military service
- Allegiance: People's Republic of China
- Branch/service: People's Liberation Army Ground Force
- Years of service: 1927–1993
- Battles/wars: Second Sino-Japanese War (1937–1945); Chinese Civil War (1946–1950); Korean War (1950–1953)

Qin Jiwei (simplified Chinese: 秦基伟; traditional Chinese: 秦基偉; pinyin: Qín Jīwěi, 16 November 1914 – 2 February 1997) was a Chinese general and politician who served as Minister of National Defense from 1988 to 1993 and as a member of the 13th Politburo of the Chinese Communist Party. A veteran of the Red Army, he commanded the 15th Army of the People's Volunteer Army at the Battle of Triangle Hill during the Korean War. He later commanded the Kunming, Chengdu and Beijing military regions. During the 1989 Tiananmen Square protests, he was reported to be reluctant to use force against the demonstrators. From 1993 until his death, he was a vice chairman of the Standing Committee of the National People's Congress.

== Early life ==
Qin was born in November 1914 in Huang'an County, now Hong'an County, in Hubei, to a poor peasant family.

== Military career ==
In 1927, Qin took part in the Huangma Uprising, a communist revolt in the Huang'an and Macheng area. He joined the Chinese Red Army in August 1929 and the Chinese Communist Party in April 1930. According to the American scholars William Whitson and Huang Chen-hsia, he spent his earliest years in the military under Xu Haidong and Xu Xiangqian, alongside the future generals Chen Zaidao and Xu Shiyou, and his unit was later redesignated the 31st Division of the Red 11th Corps.

In the Fourth Front Army of the Red Army, Qin rose from squad leader to regimental commander, and he later commanded the army's headquarters guard regiment and a replenishment division. He fought in the campaigns against the Nationalist encirclements of the Eyuwan Soviet and the Sichuan–Shaanxi base area, and he took part in the Long March. He later served with the Western Route Army, and the 2011 film Jing Sha depicts his role in its campaign, in which he led about 300 soldiers in holding a position against more than 7,000 enemy troops for three days before breaking out.

=== Second Sino-Japanese War ===
From 1937 to 1940, during the Second Sino-Japanese War, Qin commanded the Zhengtai Guerrilla Detachment and the 2nd Military Sub-district of the Taihang region, and he served as chief of the operations section and head of the staff department of the Jin-Ji-Yu Military Region. Whitson and Huang state that he commanded the 1st Military Sub-district of the Jin-Ji-Yu Military Region in 1939. From 1940 to 1945, he was deputy commander of the New 11th Brigade of the Eighth Route Army's 129th Division and commander of the 1st Military Sub-district of the Taihang Military Region, while also serving as secretary of the party's Taihang prefectural committee. He took part in the Hundred Regiments Offensive.

=== Second-half of the Chinese Civil War ===
After the Japanese surrender, Qin led the Taihang 1st Column south in September 1945, and with the deputy commander of the 6th Sub-district, He Zhengwen, he helped capture Xingtai in an assault that began on the night of 23 September and ended the following morning. His official biography states that he commanded the Taihang Military Region from 1945, while Whitson and Huang describe him as its chief of staff at the end of the war with Japan.

During the Chinese Civil War, Qin commanded the 9th Column of the Jin-Ji-Lu-Yu Military Region, which became part of the Second Field Army. According to Whitson and Huang, his units were organized into the 9th Column in 1947 and later combined with Chen Geng's 4th Column into the 4th Army of the Second Field Army, under which he commanded the 15th Corps in 1949. He took part in the Luoyang, Zhengzhou, Huaihai, Yangtze River crossing, Guangdong and southwestern campaigns.

=== Korean War ===
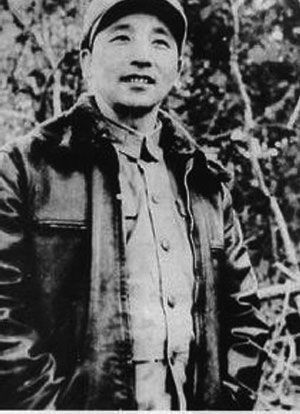
Qin Jiwei in Korea (1952)

In 1951, Qin led the 15th Army of the 3rd Army Group of the People's Volunteer Army into the Korean War. In early 1952, at the age of 38, he commanded the army as it took over a front of about 30 kilometres (19 mi) in the central "Iron Triangle" sector, and before the battle its 45th Division had built 306 tunnels with a total length of about 8,800 metres (28,900 ft).

On 14 October 1952, the Battle of Triangle Hill, known in China as the Battle of Shangganling, began with a heavy American bombardment before dawn. When the defenders lost their surface positions, Qin ordered the division commander, Cui Jiangong, to retake them, and on 20 October he called an emergency meeting that sent more than 1,200 headquarters personnel to reinforce 13 companies at the front. From 25 October, the defenders fought from the tunnels, and Qin kept in contact with the division several times a day and urged it to avoid unnecessary losses. He recorded accounts of his soldiers' actions in his diary during the battle. The fighting ended on 25 November 1952.

After returning from Korea, Qin served as deputy commander of the Yunnan and Kunming military regions and as a member of the standing committee of the Yunnan provincial party committee.

=== Post-Korean War ===
Qin studied in the campaign department of the Nanjing Military Academy from 1955 to 1957. He was made a lieutenant general in 1955. From 1957 to 1967, he was commander of the Kunming Military Region and a secretary of the secretariat of the Yunnan provincial party committee. He was also a member of the National Defense Council from 1965 to 1975. During the Cultural Revolution, he was persecuted from 1967 to 1973.

Qin was commander of the Chengdu Military Region from 1973 to 1975. From 1975 to 1987, he served in the Beijing Military Region successively as second political commissar, first political commissar and commander, and he was also director of the national civil air defense committee. A 1989 article in the Hong Kong magazine Ming Pao Monthly, translated by the American Joint Publications Research Service, named him among the veterans of the Second Field Army who replaced members of the "Whatever faction" after Deng Xiaoping's return to power in 1977.

As commander of the Beijing Military Region, Qin commanded a field military parade in Hebei in September 1981. In December 1983, he was named a deputy head of the leading group for the military parade marking the 35th anniversary of the People's Republic, which was chaired by the Chief of General Staff, Yang Dezhi. As parade commander, he accompanied Deng Xiaoping in the reviewing car on 1 October 1984 and reported to him that the troops were ready for inspection.

== Minister of National Defense ==
Qin was a delegate to the 8th National Congress of the CCP and a member of the 10th to 13th Central Committees. He was an alternate member of the 12th Politburo and was elected a full member of the 13th Politburo in 1987. In 1988, he became a State Councilor, Minister of National Defense and a member of the Central Military Commission, and on 14 September 1988 he was made a full general. A 1988 assessment published in the reading room of the Defense Intelligence Agency described him as "a professional soldier whose entire background has been predominantly as a field commander", in contrast to his predecessor, Zhang Aiping, whom it described as a research and development expert. The assessment judged him "ideally suited to head a more active and assertive" ministry.

=== 1989 Tiananmen Square protests ===
In May 1989, Qin was reported to be reluctant to use force against the protesters in Tiananmen Square. On 17 May 1989, as defense minister and a Politburo member, he attended a meeting at Deng Xiaoping's home and was directed to impose martial law on the demonstrators. Qin declined to do so immediately, citing the need to receive party approval. Deng was the chairman of the Central Military Commission, but Zhao Ziyang, as general secretary, was nominally head of the party. After the meeting, Qin called Zhao's office in the hope that Zhao would call off the martial law order, and he waited four hours, until the early morning of 18 May, for a reply that never came. A telegram from the Romanian embassy in Beijing on 4 June 1989 reported that Qin had reappeared on 3 June after almost two weeks of absence, and it claimed that he had been under house arrest until the party leadership situation was clarified. According to the telegram, he regained Deng's trust after a discussion with him, inspected forces around Beijing and told them that the army must carry out the orders of the military commission.

Qin later publicly supported the military crackdown. According to the Ming Pao Monthly article, he was forced to examine his conduct for not suppressing the student movement with sufficient vigor, and after the crackdown, as the power of Yang Shangkun's family expanded, conflict between Qin and Yang came to the fore. He remained Minister of National Defense and a member of the Central Military Commission until March 1993.

== Later life and death ==
In March 1993, Qin was elected a vice chairman of the Standing Committee of the 8th National People's Congress. He died of illness in Beijing on 2 February 1997, at the age of 82, and at the time of his death this was his only official post.

== Family ==
Qin's sons, Qin Weijiang and Qin Tian, both became generals. By January 2016, Qin Weijiang was deputy commander of the Nanjing Military Region, while Qin Tian, who was born in 1957, had moved from deputy president of the Academy of Military Science to chief of staff of the People's Armed Police. They were then the only pair of brothers among serving generals who held posts at the level of deputy commander of a military region.

== Honours ==
- China
  - Order of August 1 (2nd Class Medal) (1955)
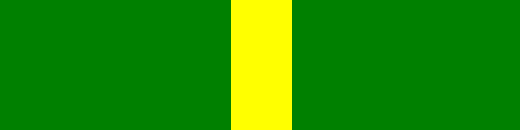
  - Order of Independence and Freedom (1st Class Medal) (1955)
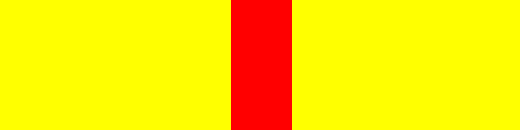
  - Order of Liberation (1st Class Medal) (1955)
- Jordan
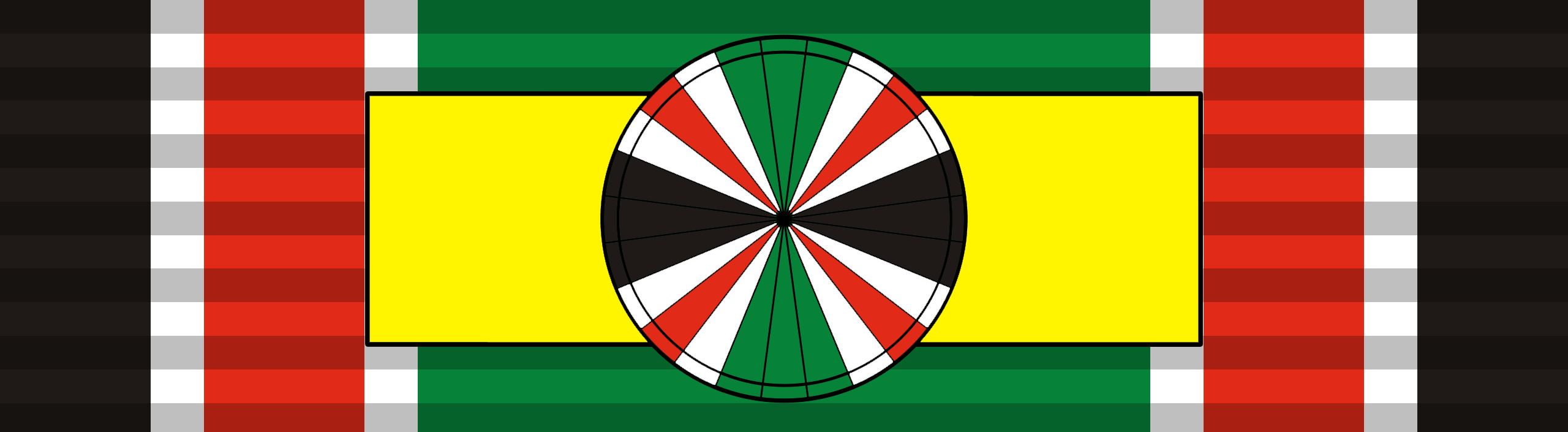
  - Grand Cordon of the Order of Military Merit (13 June 1990)
- North Korea
  - Order of the National Flag (1st Class Medal)
  - Order of the National Flag (2nd Class Medal) (twice)

Military offices
New title	Commander of the 15th Army of the Fourth Corps of the Second Field Army of the People's Liberation Army; 1949–1953	Succeeded by Li Chengfang
Preceded by Xie Fuzhi	Commander of the Kunming Military District; 1957–1971	Succeeded by Wang Bicheng
Preceded by Liang Xingchu	Commander of the Chengdu Military Region; 1973–1975	Succeeded by Liu Xingyuan
Preceded by Liu Zihou	Political Commissar of the Beijing Military Region; 1977–1980	Succeeded by Yuan Shengping
Government offices
Preceded by General Zhang Aiping	Minister of National Defense; 1988–1993	Succeeded by General Chi Haotian
