= Zhou Xiaozhou (general) =

Chinese lieutenant general

- 周小周

Chief of Staff of the Chengdu Military Region
- In office July 2012 – December 2014
- Preceded by: Ai Husheng
- Succeeded by: Rong Guiqing

Personal details
- Born: October 1956 (age 69–70) Chao County, Anhui, China
- Party: Chinese Communist Party
- Parent: Zhou Yibing
- Education: PLA National Defence University

Military service
- Allegiance: People's Republic of China
- Branch/service: People's Liberation Army Ground Force
- Years of service: 1973–present
- Rank: Lieutenant general

Zhou Xiaozhou (Chinese: 周小周; pinyin: Zhōu Xiǒozhōu; born October 1956) is a lieutenant general (zhongjiang) of the People's Liberation Army (PLA). He was a delegate to the 11th and 12th National People's Congress.

== Biography ==
Zhou was born in Chao County (now Chaohu), Anhui, in October 1956. He enlisted in the People's Liberation Army (PLA) in 1973, and joined the Chinese Communist Party (CCP) in 1976. He graduated from the PLA National Defence University. He was deputy chief of staff of the Beijing Garrison in 1998, deputy commander of the 27th Group Army in 2001, and deputy commander of the Beijing Garrison in 2003. In 2007, he was appointed commander of the 14th Group Army, he remained in that position until July 2012, when he was transferred to the Chengdu Military Region and appointed chief of staff. In December 2014, he became deputy commander of the Chengdu Military Region, and was appointed director of the Rehabilitation Office in January 2016.

== Personal life ==
His father Zhou Yibing (1922–2017) was a lieutenant general (zhongjiang) of the People's Liberation Army (PLA) who served as commander of the Beijing Military Region between 1987 and 1990.

Military offices
| Preceded by Ai Husheng | Chief of Staff of the Chengdu Military Region; 2012–2014 | Succeeded by Rong Guiqing |
