= 83rd Group Army =

Military unit

- 第八十三集团军
- Country: China
- Allegiance: Chinese Communist Party
- Branch: People's Liberation Army Ground Force
- Type: Group army
- Part of: Central Theater Command Ground Force
- Garrison/HQ: Xinxiang, Henan
- Engagements: Northern Expedition; Long March; Second Sino-Japanese War; World War II; Chinese Civil War; Korean War; Sino-Indian War; Vietnam War; Sino-Vietnamese War

Commanders
- Current commander: Major General Xie Zenggang
- Political Commissar: Major General Wang Xinmin
- Notable commanders: Ye Ting; Zhu De; Yang Dezhi; Su Yu; Xiao Ke; Yang Chengwu; Huang Yongsheng; Deng Hua; Ding Sheng

Insignia
- NATO Map Symbol

The 83rd Group Army (Chinese: 第八十三集团军; pinyin: Dì Bāshísān Jítuánjūn), Unit 31679, formerly the 54th Group Army, is a military formation of the Chinese People's Liberation Army Ground Force (PLAGF). The 83rd Group Army is one of thirteen total group armies of the PLAGF, the largest echelon of ground forces in the People's Republic of China, and one of three assigned to the nation's Central Theater Command.

== History ==
In 1952, the 45th Army Headquarter, the 134th Division and 135th Division merged with the 130th Division of the 44th Army, reorganized into the 54th Army. Then it participated in the Korean War.
In 1959, it participated in Tibet insurgency operations. In 1962, it participated in the Sino-Indian War of 1962, and the 130th Division defeated the 11th Infantry Brigade of the Indian Army in the Battle of Walong.
In 1979, it participated in the Western Front Campaign of the Sino-Vietnamese War. At the same time, the 127th Division of the 43rd Army captured Lang Son and defeated the main force of the Vietnamese army. The commander of the 127th Division at that time was Zhang Wannian, who was later the vice chairman of the Central Military Commission.
In 1985, the 54th Army was reorganized into the 54th Group Army, which governed the 160th Infantry Division and the 162nd Infantry Division, and the 161st Division was reorganized into an artillery brigade. The 127th Infantry Division of the 43rd Army was transferred to the group army. It became one of the PLA's three rapid response (strategic reserve) units, the other two being the 38th Group Army and the 39th Group Army.
Troops from the army were deployed into Beijing in June 1989 and participated in the anti-protester clearance operations.
After 1997, the 127th Infantry Division was converted into a light mechanized infantry division, and the 160th Infantry Division was converted into a motorized infantry brigade. The 11th Armored Division belonging to the 20th Group Army was swapped with the Armored Brigade of the 54th Group Army, and the anti-aircraft artillery brigade was reorganized into an air defense brigade.
In 2009, the 162nd Infantry Division was converted into a wheeled mechanized infantry division, using the Type 08 series 8×8 wheeled vehicles.
In February 2016, the seven military regions were reorganized into five theater commands, as part of the 2015 People's Republic of China military reform, 54th Army belongs to Central Theater Command.
In 2017, in an adjustment and establishment of military units, the 83rd Group Army was reorganized based on the 54th Group Army.

== Organization ==
Before 2017, the 54th Group Army was consist of the 127th Mechanized Infantry Division, the 162nd Mechanized Infantry Division, the 160th Mechanized Infantry Brigade, the 11th Armored Brigade, the Artillery Brigade, the Air Defense Brigade, and the Army Aviation Regiment, Communications Regiment, Engineering Regiment, etc.

Nowadays, the 83rd Group Army is composed of:

- 11th Heavy Combined Arms Brigade
- 58th Medium Combined Arms Brigade
- 60th Medium Combined Arms Brigade
- 113th Medium Combined Arms Brigade
- 131st Heavy Combined Arms Brigade
- 193rd Medium Combined Arms Brigade
- 161st Air Assault Combined Arms Brigade
- 83rd Artillery Brigade
- 83rd Air Defense Brigade
- 83rd Engineering and Chemical Defense Brigade
- 83rd Service Support Brigade

== Commanders ==
- Ding Sheng (1952.10-1955.12)
- Ouyang Jiaxiang (1955.12-1957.09)
- Ding Sheng (1957.09-1964.09)
- Wei Tongtai (1964.09-1969.06)
- Han Huaizhi (1969.06-1980.05)
- Li Jiulong (1980.05-1985.06)
- Zhu Chao (1985.08-1990.06)
- Liang Guanglie (1990.06-1993.12)
- Zhang Xianglin (1993.12-1998.12)
- Huang Hanbiao (1998.12-2006.08)
- Song Puxuan (2006.08-2009.02)
- Rong Guiqing (2009.02-2014.12)
- Shi Zhenglu (2014.12-2017.04)
- Xie Zenggang(2017.04-)
