= Han Weiguo =

Chinese PLA general

- 韩卫国
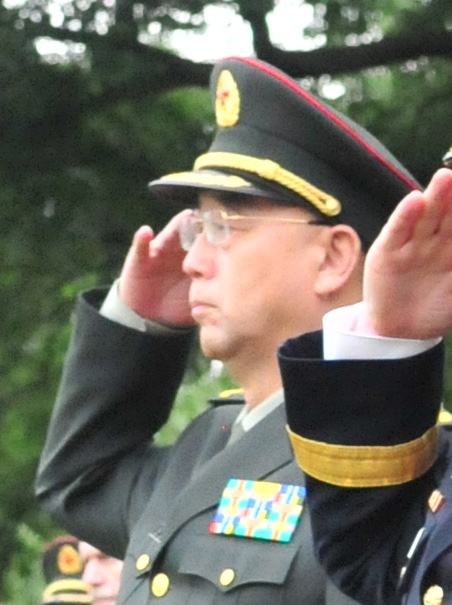

Commander of the People's Liberation Army Ground Force
- In office August 2017 – June 2021
- Preceded by: Li Zuocheng
- Succeeded by: Liu Zhenli

Commander of the Central Theater Command
- In office February 2016 – August 2017
- Preceded by: New title
- Succeeded by: Yi Xiaoguang

Personal details
- Born: January 1956 (age 70) Jingxing County, Hebei, China
- Party: Chinese Communist Party
- Education: PLA National Defence University

Military service
- Allegiance: People's Republic of China
- Branch/service: People's Liberation Army Ground Force
- Years of service: 1970–2021
- Rank: General

Chinese name
- Simplified Chinese: 韩卫国
- Traditional Chinese: 韓衛國
Transcriptions
Standard Mandarin
- Hanyu Pinyin: Hán Wèiguó

Han Weiguo (Chinese: 韩卫国; born January 1956) is a general (shang jiang) of the Chinese People's Liberation Army (PLA). He was Commander of the PLA Ground Force from August 2017 to June 2021, and formerly served as the inaugural Commander of the Central Theater Command.

== Biography ==
Originally from Jingxing County, Hebei, Han is a graduate of the PLA National Defense University. He served as the commander of the 12th Group Army (now 71st Group Army), then in December 2013, the deputy commander of the Beijing Military Region (now defunct). He was promoted to lieutenant general in 2015. After the 2016 re-organization of the PLA, he was named Commander of the Central Theater Command; at that time he was only one of two lieutenant generals named to commander or commissar positions in the re-organized Theater Command structure. He was promoted to the rank of General on July 28, 2017. In August 2017, he commanded a military parade at Zhurihe Training Base in Inner Mongolia celebrating the 90th anniversary of the Nanchang uprising and the founding of the People's Liberation Army, which marked the first time that a Chinese military parade had been held outside of the capital of Beijing. That same month, Han was named the commander of the PLA Ground Force, succeeding General Li Zuocheng.

In 2013, Han became a deputy to the 12th National People's Congress. In October 2017, he was elected as a member of the 19th Central Committee of the Chinese Communist Party.

On 20 August 2021, he was appointed vice chairperson of the Foreign Affairs Committee of the National People's Congress.

On 2 March 2026, the fifteenth meeting of the Standing Committee of the 14th National Committee of the Chinese People's Political Consultative Conference (CPPCC) adopted a decision to revoke Han's membership in the 14th National Committee of the CPPCC and to remove him from his positions as a member of the Standing Committee of the 14th CPPCC National Committee and vice chairman of the Proposals Committee.

Military offices
Preceded by Wang Jiaocheng	Commander of the 12th Group Army; 2008–2013	Succeeded by Wang Chunning
New title	Commander of the Central Theater Command; 2016–2017	Succeeded by Yi Xiaoguang
Preceded by Li Zuocheng	Commander of the People's Liberation Army Ground Force; 2017–2021	Succeeded by Liu Zhenli
