= Li Shiming (disambiguation) =

Li Shiming is a Chinese general.

Li Shiming may also refer to:

- Lee Hsi-ming, Taiwan admiral
- Li Shiming (politician) (born 1955), vice-president of the All-China Federation of Trade Unions

== See also ==
- Li Shimin (599–649), Emperor Taizong of Tang Dynasty
