= Huang Xucong =

Chinese general

- 黄旭聪

Chief of Staff of the Central Theater Command
- Incumbent
- Assumed office March 2024
- Commander: Han Shengyan
- Preceded by: Jia Jiancheng
- Political Commissar: Xu Deqing

Personal details
- Born: August 1968 (age 57) Pujiang, Zhejiang, China
- Party: Chinese Communist Party

Military service
- Allegiance: People's Republic of China
- Branch/service: People's Liberation Army Ground Force
- Years of service: ?-present
- Rank: Lieutenant General
- Unit: 1st Group Army 74th Group Army Central Theater Command

Huang Xucong (Chinese: 黄旭聪; born August 1968) is a lieutenant general of the People's Liberation Army. He currently serves as the chief of staff and deputy commander of the Central Theater Command. In July 2017 Huang's rank was elevated to the rank of major general. In March 2024 he was promoted to the rank of lieutenant general.

== Biography ==
Huang was born in Pujiang County, Zhejiang Province in August 1968. He served as the Chief of Staff of the 73041 Unit, deputy chief of staff of the 1st Group Army. In 2016 he was promoted to its deputy commander and one year later he was promoted to the rank of major general. He was also heading the delegation to the "Tank Biathlon-2014" an international competition in Russia. He as well served as the commander of the 74th Group Army. In 2024 Huang Xucong also heads the Chinese military delegation in the joint military exercise "Peace and Unity 2024" between Chinese and Tanzanian troops. There he participated in the closing ceremony and handed out honorary certificates to outstanding participants of both Armed Forces. With him were major general Ye Dabin and major general Xue Zhengyun. In March 2024 he was appointed chief of staff and deputy commander of the Central Theater Command and promoted to the rank of lieutenant general. In 2025 he was heading a People's Liberation Army delegation to Rwanda with the goal of strengthening the cooperation between the PLA and the Rwanda Defense Force.

He is also an alternate of the 20th Central Committee of the Chinese Communist Party.

Military offices
Preceded by Jia Jiancheng	Chief of Staff of the Central Theater Command; 2024-present	Incumbent
