= Huang Ming (military officer) =

Chinese military officer

- 黄铭

Commander of the Northern Theater Command
- In office August 2024 – October 2026
- Preceded by: Wang Qiang

Commander of the Central Theater Command
- In office January 2023 – August 2024
- Preceded by: Wu Yanan
- Succeeded by: Wang Qiang

Chief of Staff of the People's Liberation Army Ground Force
- In office September 2021 – January 2023
- Preceded by: Liu Zhenli
- Succeeded by: TBA

Commander of the 81st Group Army
- In office March 2017 – June 2019
- Preceded by: New title
- Succeeded by: Wu Aimin

Commander of the 75th Group Army
- In office July 2016 – March 2017
- Preceded by: Li Qiaoming
- Succeeded by: Position abolished

Chief of staff of the 78th Group Army
- In office 2013–2016
- Preceded by: Zhang Xuefeng
- Succeeded by: Ding Laifu

Personal details
- Born: April 1963 (age 63) Yixing, Jiangsu, China
- Party: Chinese Communist Party (expelled in 2026)

Military service
- Allegiance: People's Republic of China
- Branch/service: People's Liberation Army Ground Force
- Years of service: 1980–present
- Rank: General

Chinese name
- Traditional Chinese: 黃銘
- Simplified Chinese: 黄铭
Transcriptions
Standard Mandarin
- Hanyu Pinyin: Huáng Míng

Huang Ming (Chinese: 黄铭; born April 1963) is a general (shangjiang) of the People's Liberation Army (PLA). He served as the commander of the Northern Theater Command. He previously served as commander of the Central Theater Command from January 2023 to August 2024, chief of staff of the People's Liberation Army Ground Force from September 2021 to January 2023, and formerly served as commander of the 81st Group Army.

Huang is a member of the 20th Central Committee of the Chinese Communist Party. He was also a delegate to the 13th National People's Congress.

== Biography ==
Huang was born in Yixing, Jiangsu in 1963. He enlisted in the People's Liberation Army (PLA) in 1980, after high school. He served as chief of staff of the 78th Group Army before serving as commander of the 75th Group Army. In March 2017 he was appointed commander of the 81st Group Army, and held that office until June 2019, when he was promoted to become deputy commander of the People's Liberation Army Ground Force.

He was promoted to the rank of major general (shaojiang) in July 2014, lieutenant general (zhongjiang) in December 2019. and general (shangjiang) in January 2023.

On 29 October 2026, the fifth plenary session of the 20th CCP Central Committee reviewed and approved the report of the Discipline Inspection Commission of the Central Military Commission on the "serious violations of discipline and law" by Huang and confirmed the Politburo decision to expel him from the CCP.

Military offices
Preceded by Zhang Xuefeng (张学锋)	Chief of staff of the 78th Group Army; 2013–2016	Succeeded by Ding Laifu (丁来富)
Preceded by Li Qiaoming	Commander of the 75th Group Army; 2016–2017	Succeeded by Position abolished
New title	Commander of the 81st Group Army; 2017–2019	Succeeded by Wu Aimin (吴爱民)
Preceded by Liu Zhenli	Chief of Staff of the People's Liberation Army Ground Force; 2021–2023	Succeeded by TBA
Preceded by Wu Yanan	Commander of the Central Theatre Command; 2023–2024	Succeeded by Wang Qiang
Preceded by Wang Qiang	Commander of the Northern Theatre Command; 2024-2026	Incumbent
