= 58th Mechanized Infantry Brigade =

Brigade of the People's Liberation Army

58th Division (1949–1952) 58th Infantry Division (1952–1960) 58th Army Division (1960–1985) 58th Infantry Division (1985–1998) 58th Motorized Infantry Brigade (1998–99) 58th Mechanized Infantry Brigade (1999–2017) 58th Medium Combined Arms Brigade (2017–present)
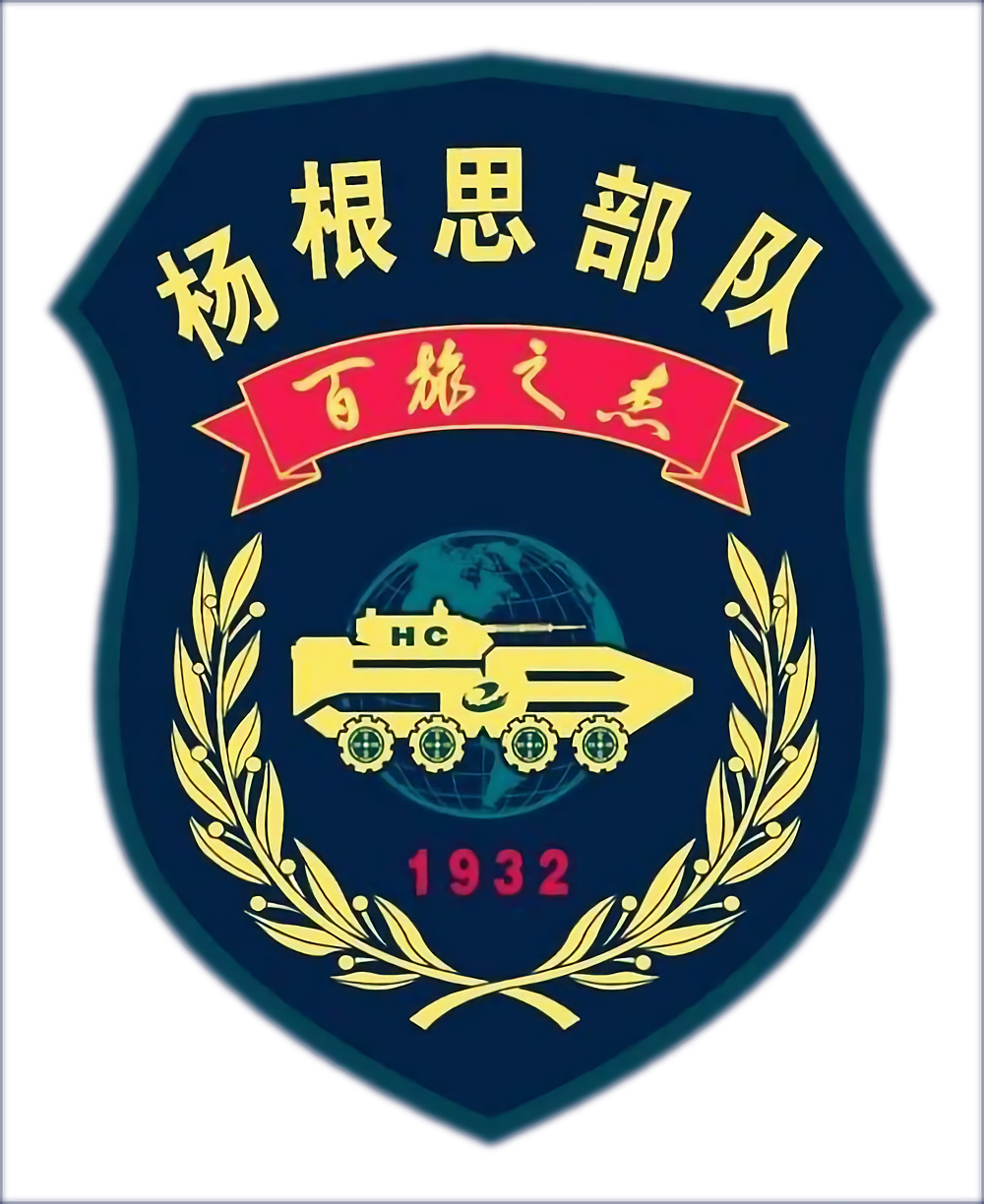
- Patch of 58th HCB
- Founded: 1932
- Country: China
- Allegiance: Chinese Communist Party
- Branch: PLA Ground Force; People's Volunteer Army
- Type: Mechanized infantry
- Role: Combined arms warfare
- Size: Brigade
- Part of: 83rd Group Army
- Garrison/HQ: Xuchang, Henan
- Nickname: Elite of Hundred Brigades (Chinese: 百旅之杰)
- Engagements: Chinese Civil War, Korean War, Vietnam War, Sino-Vietnamese War

The 58th Medium Combined Arms Brigade (Chinese: 中型合成第58旅) is a brigade of the People's Liberation Army Ground Force. It is one of the six combined arms brigades of the 83rd Group Army under the Central Theater Command. The 58th was previously a division, being converted to a brigade-sized formation in 1998.

The 58th Division (Chinese: 第58师) was created in February 1949 under the Regulation of the Redesignations of All Organizations and Units of the Army, issued by Central Military Commission on November 1, 1948, basing on the 1st Division, 1st Column of the PLA Huadong Field Army. Its history can be traced to 3rd Guerrilla Contingent of Eastern Fujian Red Army, formed in May 1933.

The division is part of 20th Corps.

== History ==
Under the flag of 58th division it was part of took part in several major battles during the Chinese Civil War such as the battle of Yangtze Crossing and the Battle of Shanghai.

In November 1950 the division entered Korea as part of the People's Volunteer Army. At this time, the division consisted of the 172nd, 173rd, and 174th Regiments.

The 58th Division engaged U.N forces at Hagaru-ri and Kot’ori during the Battle of Chosin Reservoir. The division's attacks at Hagaru-ri were unsuccessful. The division's attacks at Kot'ori were unsuccessful in halting UN forces from reinforcing their positions Hagaru-ri, but it, along with the 60th division, inflicted severe losses on the convoy. Per official Chinese lore, Yang Gensi, commander of 3rd Company, 172nd Infantry Regiment, sacrificed himself when holding a strategic position with one of his platoons by throwing himself into a group of more than 40 UN soldiers while holding a satchel charge, killing himself and some UN soldiers. Yang was posthumously awarded the titles of "First Class Hero of People's Volunteer Army", and "Hero of Democratic People's Republic of Korea".

In October 1952 the division pulled out from Korea and renamed the 58th Infantry Division (Chinese: 步兵第58师). The division was then composed of:

- 172nd Infantry Regiment;
- 173rd Infantry Regiment;
- 174th Infantry Regiment;
- 263rd Tank Self-Propelled Artillery Regiment;
- 338th Artillery Regiment.

On November 9, 1956, 263rd Tank Self-Propelled Artillery Regiment was detached from the division and renamed Tank Crew Training Regiment of Jinan Military Region.

In 1960, the division was renamed the 58th Army Division (Chinese: 陆军第58师).

In 1969, 338th Artillery Regiment was renamed Artillery Regiment, 58th Army Division.

In March 1979, the division took part in the Sino-Vietnamese War. During its deployment in Vietnam, it inflicted 629 KIA and 3 POW on the opposing PAVN forces while suffering 64 killed and 165 wounded.

In October 1985, the division was renamed the 58th Infantry Division (Chinese: 步兵第58师). Tank Regiment, 20th Army Corps was attached to the division and renamed as Tank Regiment, 58th Infantry Division; Anti-aircraft Artillery Regiment was activated from an unknown unit. Since then, the division was composed of:

- 172nd Motorized Infantry Regiment;
- 173rd Motorized Infantry Regiment;
- 174th Motorized Infantry Regiment;
- Tank Regiment;
- Artillery Regiment;
- Anti-aircraft Artillery Regiment.

The division maintained as a Northern Motorized Infantry Division, Category A from 1985 to 1998.

In 1998 the division was reduced and renamed as the 58th Motorized Infantry Brigade (Chinese: 摩托化步兵第58旅). The brigade conversion in 1998 was part of the PLA's effort to experiment with a Corps-Brigade-Battalion force structure instead of the traditional Corps-Division-Regiment structure.

In 1999 the brigade was further re-organized as the 58th Mechanized Infantry Brigade (Chinese: 机械化步兵第58旅), becoming the first mechanized brigade of the PLA Ground Force.

The brigade is one of the units of the Jinan MR tasked to serve as one of the mobile response elements capable of reinforcing Groups Armies in other Military Regions in case of emergency or war.

In 2017 the brigade was reorganized as the 58th Medium Combined Arms Brigade (Chinese: 中型合成第58旅) and transferred to the 83rd Group Army, following 20th's disbandment.
