= Wang Qiang (general) =

Chinese general

- 王强

Commander of the Central Theater Command
- In office August 2024 – December 2025
- Preceded by: Huang Ming
- Succeeded by: Han Shengyan

Commander of the Northern Theater Command
- In office September 2022 – August 2024
- Preceded by: Li Qiaoming
- Succeeded by: Huang Ming

Commander of the Western Theater Command Air Force
- In office April 2020 – August 2022
- Preceded by: Zhan Houshun
- Succeeded by: Zhang Hongbin

Chief of Staff of the Western Theater Command
- In office January 2016 – July 2018

Personal details
- Born: 1963 (age 62–63) Rong County, Sichuan, China
- Party: Chinese Communist Party

Military service
- Allegiance: People's Republic of China
- Branch/service: People's Liberation Army Air Force
- Rank: General
- Commands: Western Theater Command

Chinese name
- Traditional Chinese: 王強
- Simplified Chinese: 王强
Transcriptions
Standard Mandarin
- Hanyu Pinyin: Wáng Qiáng

Wang Qiang (Chinese: 王强; born 1963) is an air force general of the People's Liberation Army (PLA) who served as the commander of the Central Theater Command from August 2024 to December 2025. Previously he served as the commander of the Northern Theater Command from September 2022 to August 2024 and as the commander of the Western Theater Command Air Force from April 2020 to August 2022. Wang was promoted to major general in July 2014 and to lieutenant general in June 2019.

== Biography ==
Wang was born in Rong County, Zigong, Sichuan province in 1963. He served as commander of the 12th Division of the Air Force of Jinan Military Region before serving as its deputy chief of staff in July 2013. In January 2016, he was commissioned in the Western Theater Command where he was assigned as deputy chief of staff and chief of staff of its Air Force. In July 2018, he was promoted to deputy commander of the Western Theater Command and concurrently serves as commander of its Air Force since April 2020. In September 2022, he was promoted to commander of the Northern Theater Command, replacing Li Qiaoming. According to the Jamestown Foundation Wang has switched his office with General Huang Ming and is now Commander of the Central Theater Command. In December 2025 Han Shengyan became Commander of the Central Theater Commander and replaced him.

He was promoted to the rank of major general (shaojiang) in July 2014, lieutenant general (zhongjiang) in June 2019, and general (shangjiang) in September 2022.

Wang was a full member of the 20th Central Committee of the Chinese Communist Party.

Military offices
Preceded by Zhan Houshun	Commander of the Western Theater Command Air Force; 2020–2022	Succeeded by Zhang Hongbin
Preceded by Li Qiaoming	Commander of the Northern Theater Command; 2022–2024	Succeeded by Huang Ming
Preceded by Huang Ming	Commander of the Central Theater Command; 2024-2025	Succeeded by Han Shengyan
