= Qin Tian =

- 秦天

Chief of Staff of the People's Armed Police
- In office December 2015 – September 2017
- Preceded by: Liu Zhenli
- Succeeded by: Zheng Jiagai

Personal details
- Born: 1957 (age 68–69) Huanggang, Hubei, China
- Party: Chinese Communist Party

Military service
- Allegiance: China
- Branch/service: People's Armed Police
- Rank: Lieutenant General (police rank)
- Unit: 1973 — 2020

Qin Tian (Chinese: 秦天; born 1957) is a lieutenant general of China's People's Armed Police (PAP). He is a member of the PAP's Chinese Communist Party (CCP) Standing Committee, Vice Commander of the People's Armed Police, former Chief of Staff of the People's Armed Police from 2015 to 2017.

== Biography ==
He was born in Hong'an, Huanggang, Hubei Province. In 1973, he to join the military. He had worked for People's Liberation Army General Armaments Department and then PLA National Defence University.

In July 2015, Qin Tian was appointed as the Vice president of the PLA Academy of Military Science.

In December 2015, Qin Tian was promoted to Chief of Staff of the People's Armed Police. In July 2016, he was promoted police rank lieutenant general of PAP.

In September 2017, he became Vice Commander of the People's Armed Police. On February 5, 2018, Qin Tian was elected as a member of the CCP Standing Committee of the PAP.

== Family ==
Qin Tian is the son of Qin Jiwei, was a general, former Minister of National Defense. His brother is Qin Weijiang, a lieutenant general of the People's Liberation Army.
