= Central Theater Command Ground Force =

- 中国人民解放军中部战区陆军
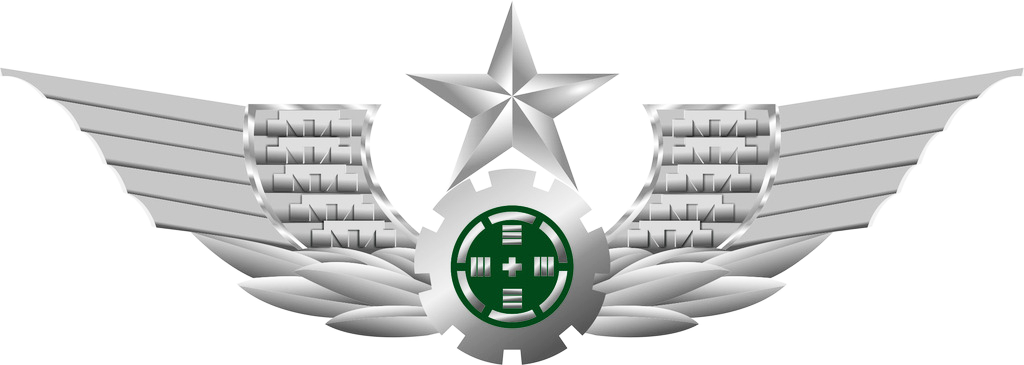
- Emblem of the People's Liberation Army Ground Force
- Active: 2016–present
- Country: China
- Allegiance: Chinese Communist Party
- Branch: People's Liberation Army Ground Force
- Part of: Central Theater Command
- Garrison/HQ: Shijiazhuang, Hebei
- Mottos: 为人民服务 "Serve the People"
- Colors: Red and Green
- March: Military Anthem of the People's Liberation Army
- Decorations: Commander

Commanders
- Commander: Lieutenant General Duan Yingmin
- Political Commissar: Lieutenant General Miao Wenjiang

Central Theater Command Ground Force
- Central Theater Command
- Simplified Chinese: 中国人民解放军中部战区陆军
- Traditional Chinese: 中國人民解放軍中部戰區陸軍
Transcriptions
Standard Mandarin
- Hanyu Pinyin: Zhōngguó Rénmín Jiěfàngjūn Zhōngbù Zhànqū Lùjūn

The Central Theater Command Ground Force is the ground force under the Central Theater Command. Its headquarters is in Shijiazhuang, Hebei. The current commander is Fan Chengcai and the current political commissar is Zhou Wanzhu.

== History ==
The Central Theater Command Ground Force was officially established on 31 December 2015 with the troops of former Beijing Military Region, Jinan Military Region and Guangzhou Military Region.

== Functional departments ==
- General Staff
- Political Work Department
- Logistics Department
- Equipment department
- Disciplinary Inspection Committee

== Directly subordinate functional units ==
- PLA Ground Force Queshan Joint Tactic Training Base
- PLA Ground Force Ninth Comprehensive Training Base
- PLA Ground Force Tenth Comprehensive Training Base

== Directly subordinate combat units ==
=== Group armies ===
- 81st Group Army (stations in Zhangjiakou, Hebei)
- 82nd Group Army (stations in Baoding, Hebei)
- 83rd Group Army (stations in Xinxiang, Henan)

=== Other army units ===
- Fifth Brigade of Reconnaissance Intelligence
- Fifth Brigade of Information Support
- Fifth Brigade of Electronic Warfare
- 32nd Engineering and Amphibious Brigade

== List of leaders ==
=== Commanders ===
| English name | Chinese name | Took office | Left office | Notes |
|---|---|---|---|---|
| Shi Luze | 史鲁泽 | February 2016 | January 2017 | |
| Zhang Xudong | 张旭东 | January 2017 | December 2017 | |
| Fan Chengcai | 范承才 | December 2017 | December 2022 | |
| Duan Yingmin | 段应民 | December 2022 | | |

=== Political commissars ===
| English name | Chinese name | Took office | Left office | Notes |
|---|---|---|---|---|
| Wu Shezhou | 吴社洲 | February 2016 | January 2017 | |
| Zhou Wanzhu | 周皖柱 | January 2017 | June 2023 | |
| Miao Wenjiang | 缪文江 | June 2023 | | |

=== Chiefs of staff ===
| English name | Chinese name | Took office | Left office | Notes |
|---|---|---|---|---|
| Sun Yongbo | 孙永波 | 2016 | | |
