= Li Qiaoming =

Chinese army general (born 1961)

- 李桥铭
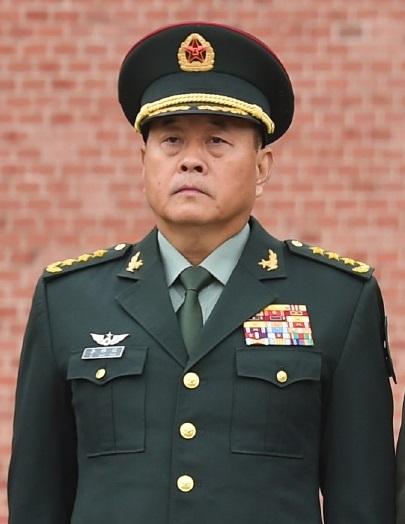
- Li Qiaoming in 2024

Commander of the People's Liberation Army Ground Force
- In office December 2022 – December 2024
- Preceded by: Liu Zhenli
- Succeeded by: TBA

Commander of the Northern Theater Command
- In office September 2017 – September 2022
- Preceded by: Song Puxuan
- Succeeded by: Wang Qiang

Personal details
- Born: April 1961 (age 65) Yanshi, Henan, China
- Party: Chinese Communist Party (expelled in 2026)

Military service
- Allegiance: People's Republic of China
- Branch/service: People's Liberation Army Ground Force
- Years of service: 1976–2024
- Rank: General

Chinese name
- Simplified Chinese: 李桥铭
- Traditional Chinese: 李橋銘
Transcriptions
Standard Mandarin
- Hanyu Pinyin: Lǐ Qiáomíng

Li Qiaoming (Chinese: 李桥铭; pinyin: Lǐ Qiáomíng; born April 1961) is a general of the Chinese People's Liberation Army (PLA), who served as commander of the PLA Ground Force from December 2022 to December 2024. He served as commander of the Northern Theater Command from September 2017 to September 2022. In 2026, Li was expelled from the Chinese Communist Party.

== Biography ==
Li Qiaoming was born in April 1961 in Yanshi, Henan Province and enlisted in the People's Liberation Army (PLA) in 1976. He successively served as Chief of Staff of the 361st Regiment, Commander of the 364th Regiment, Chief of Staff of the 124th Division, Deputy Chief of Staff of the 42nd Group Army, and Commander of the 124th Division of the 42nd Army.

He was appointed Chief of Staff of the 41st Group Army in January 2010, (In July 2011 he was awarded the rank of major general) and promoted to Commander of the 41st Army in September 2013. In 2013 he wrote an article about soviet army "nonparty tragedy". In February 2016, he became Commander of the Northern Theater Command Ground Force, and awarded the rank of lieutenant general a few months later. In September 2017, he was promoted again to Commander of the Northern Theater Command, succeeding General Song Puxuan, who had been appointed Director of the Logistic Support Department of the Central Military Commission.

In October 2017, he was elected as a member of the 19th Central Committee of the Chinese Communist Party.

In December 2019, he was promoted to the rank of general.

In December 2022, Li was commissioned as commander of the PLA Ground Force.

In December 2024, he was dismissed as Commander of the PLA Ground Force together with general Qin Shutong.

=== Downfall ===
In February 2026, Li and several others got their qualifications to the National People's Congress terminated. On 29 October 2026, the fifth plenary session of the 20th CCP Central Committee reviewed and approved the report of the Discipline Inspection Commission of the Central Military Commission on the "serious violations of discipline and law" by Li and confirmed the Politburo decision to expel him from the CCP.

Military offices
| New title | Commander of the Northern Theater Command Ground Force; 2016–2017 | Succeeded by Wang Yinfang |
| Preceded by Song Puxuan | Commander of the Northern Theater Command; 2017–2022 | Succeeded by Wang Qiang |
| Preceded by Liu Zhenli | Commander of the People's Liberation Army Ground Force; 2022–present | Incumbent |
