= Central Theater Command =

Military region of China

- 中部战区
- Founded: 1 February 2016; 10 years ago
- Country: China
- Type: Theater Command
- Role: Command and control
- Size: 300,000
- Part of: Central Military Commission; People's Liberation Army
- Headquarters: Beijing
- Motto: 听党指挥、能打胜仗、作风优良
- Website: Official website

Commanders
- Commander: General Han Shengyan
- Political Commissar: General Xu Deqing
- Chief of Staff: Lieutenant General Huang Xucong

Insignia
- Sleeve insignia

Central Theater Command
- Simplified Chinese: 中部战区
- Traditional Chinese: 中部戰區
Transcriptions
Standard Mandarin
- Hanyu Pinyin: Zhōngbù Zhànqū

The Central Theater Command is one of the five theater commands of the People's Liberation Army of China. Founded on 1 February 2016, its predecessors were the Beijing Military Region, Jinan Military Region, Guangzhou Military Region and Lanzhou Military Region.

The International Institute for Strategic Studies attributes to the command of 300,000 personnel, consisting of three group armies 81st Group Army, 82nd Group Army, 83rd Group Army (Formerly 27th Group Army, 38th Army, and the 65th Army), two armoured divisions, one mechanised infantry division, five motorised divisions, one artillery division, three armoured, seven motorised infantry, four artillery, a total of five various anti-aircraft brigades, and one anti-tank regiment. The command is also augmented by the PLA Beijing Garrison, which consists of the 1st Guard and the 3rd Guard Divisions, and the Beijing Garrison Honor Guard Battalion and Color Guard Company, both of them are charged with public duties, and is also home to the PLA Navy (PLAN) North Sea Fleet and the PLA Air Force (PLAAF) 10th Air Force Corps. In addition to guarding the capital, the CTC is the main military theater command in charge of training key personnel for leadership positions through the numerous military academies in the region.

== Area of responsibility ==
The Central Theater Command's area of responsibility (AOR) consists of the previous Beijing Military Region, including the capital Beijing and the neighboring provinces and directly governed municipalities of Tianjin, Hebei, Shaanxi, Shanxi, Henan and Hubei.

The command's primary responsibility is the defense of the nation's capital, Beijing, and it serves as the national strategic military reserve.

== History ==
Founded on 1 February 2016, its predecessors were the Beijing Military Region and Jinan Military Region.

== Organizational Structure ==
=== PLA Ground Forces ===
==== Regiments/Units ====
===== 81st Group Army =====
- 7th Heavy Combined Arms Brigade
- 70th Light Combined Arms Brigade, located in Tangshan Prefecture, Hebei Province
- 162nd Motorized Infantry Division, located in Anyang Prefecture, Henan Province
- 189th Medium Combined Arms Brigade
- 194th Combined Arms Brigade
- 195th Heavy Combined Arms Brigade, located in Yutian County, Hebei Province

==== 82nd Group Army ====
- 6th Heavy Combined Arms Brigade, located in Nankou Town Area, Changping District, Beijing
- 80th Medium Combined Arms Brigade
- 127th Light Mechanized Infantry Division (a.k.a. the Red Army Division), located in Luoyang Prefecture, Henan Province
- 151st Heavy Combined Arms Brigade
- 188th Heavy Combined Arms Brigade
- 196th Light Combined Arms Brigade

==== 83rd Group Army ====
- 11th Heavy Combined Arms Brigade
- 58th Medium Combined Arms Brigade, located in Xuchang Prefecture, Henan Province
- 60th Medium Combined Arms Brigade, located in Minggang Town Area, Xinyang Prefecture, Henan Province
- 113th Combined Arms Brigade, located in Baoding Prefecture, Hebei Province
- 131st Combined Arms Brigade
- 193rd Medium Combined Arms Brigade, located in Xuanhua District, Zhangjiakou Prefecture, Hebei Province

==== PLA Beijing Garrison ====
- 1st Guard Division, located in Haidian, Beijing
  - 3rd Guards Regiment (Heavy Infantry)
  - 4th Guards Regiment (Light Quick reaction force)
  - 5th Guards Regiment (Light Quick reaction force)
  - Central Guard Regiment
  - Honor Guard Battalion
- 3rd Guard Division, located in Tongzhou, Beijing
  - 11th Guards Regiment (showcase unit)
  - 13th Guards Regiment (special security unit)
  - Armored Regiment
  - Artillery Regiment
  - Anti-Aircraft Artillery Regiment
  - Support Battalion
- 17th Guard Regiment
- Reserve Unit
- Reserve Officer Training Corps
- Reserve Artillery Division, located in Huairou, Beijing
- Reserve Chemical Defense Regiment, located in Xicheng, Beijing

== List of leaders ==
=== Commanders ===
English name	Chinese name	Took office	Left office	Notes
Han Weiguo	韩卫国	February 2016	August 2017	
Yi Xiaoguang	乙晓光	August 2017	August 2021	
Lin Xiangyang	林向阳	August 2021	January 2022	
Wu Yanan	吴亚男	January 2022	January 2023	
Huang Ming	黄铭	January 2023	August 2024	
Wang Qiang	王强	August 2024	December 2025	
Han Shengyan	韩胜延	December 2025	Incumbent	

=== Political commissars ===
English name	Chinese name	Took office	Left office	Notes
Yin Fanglong	殷方龙	February 2016	December 2018	
Zhu Shengling	朱生岭	March 2019	January 2022	
Xu Deqing	徐德清	January 2022	Incumbent	

=== Chiefs of staff ===
English name	Chinese name	Took office	Left office	Notes
Jia Jiancheng	贾建成			
Huang Xucong	黄旭聪		Incumbent	

== See also ==
- Central Theater Command Ground Force
- Central Theater Command Air Force
