= Rong Guiqing =

- 戎贵卿

Chief of Staff of the Western Theater Command
- In office January 2016 – June 2021
- Preceded by: New title
- Succeeded by: Li Zhonglin

Deputy Commander of the Western Theater Command
- In office January 2016 – June 2021
- Leader: Zhao Zongqi; Zhang Xudong
- Succeeded by: Li Zhonglin

Chief of Staff of the Chengdu Military Region
- In office December 2014 – December 2015
- Preceded by: Zhou Xiaozhou
- Succeeded by: Position revoked

Personal details
- Born: May 1958 (age 68) Weishi County, Henan, China
- Party: Chinese Communist Party
- Education: PLA National Defence University

Military service
- Allegiance: People's Republic of China
- Branch/service: People's Liberation Army Ground Force
- Rank: Lieutenant general

Rong Guiqing (simplified Chinese: 戎贵卿; traditional Chinese: 戎貴卿; pinyin: Róng Guìqīng; born May 1958) is a lieutenant general (zhongjiang) in the Chinese People's Liberation Army. He has previously served as Chief of Staff of the Chengdu Military Region and Commander of the 54th Group Army.

== Biography ==
Rong was born in Weishi County, Henan Province. He is a graduate of the PLA National Defence University. He is a member of the Chinese Communist Party.

In July 2008, he was promoted to the rank of major general. In 2009 he became Commander of the 54th Group Army of the Jinan Military Region, a position he held until December 2014, when he was transferred to the Chengdu Military Region and served as Chief of Staff, replacing Zhou Xiaozhou. In January 2016, he was appointed deputy commander and chief of staff of the newly established Western Theater Command. He was promoted to lieutenant general (zhongjiang) in July 2016.

He was a delegate to the 12th National People's Congress.

Military offices
Preceded by Song Puxuan	Commander of the 54th Group Army; 2009–2014	Succeeded by Shi Zhenglu
Preceded by Zhou Xiaozhou (周小周)	Chief of Staff of the Chengdu Military Region; 2014–2015	Succeeded by Position revoked
New title	Chief of Staff and Deputy Commander of the Western Theater Command; 2016–2021	Succeeded by Li Zhonglin
