= Li Zuocheng =

Chinese general

General Li Zuocheng
- 李作成
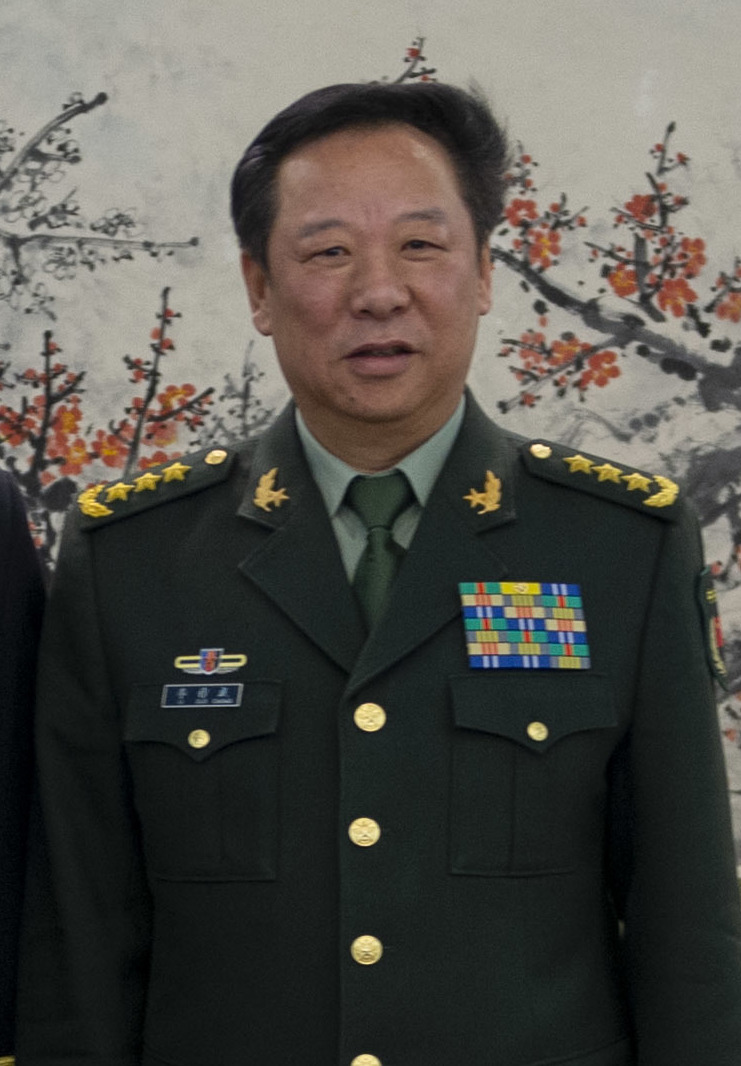
- Li in 2019

Chief of Staff of the Joint Staff Department of the Central Military Commission
- In office August 2017 – October 2022
- CMC Chairman: Xi Jinping
- Preceded by: Fang Fenghui
- Succeeded by: Liu Zhenli

Commander of the People's Liberation Army Ground Force
- In office January 2016 – August 2017
- Preceded by: Position created
- Succeeded by: Han Weiguo

Commander of Chengdu Military Region
- In office August 2013 – January 2016
- Preceded by: Li Shiming
- Succeeded by: Position abolished

Personal details
- Born: October 1953 (age 72) Anhua County, Hunan, China
- Party: Chinese Communist Party
- Awards: Merit of the First Class

Military service
- Allegiance: People's Republic of China
- Branch/service: People's Liberation Army Ground Force
- Years of service: 1970–2022
- Rank: General
- Commands: CMC Joint Staff Department, PLA Ground Force, Chengdu Military Region, 41st Group Army
- Battles/wars: Sino-Vietnamese War

Li Zuocheng (Chinese: 李作成; pinyin: Lǐ Zuóchéng; born October 1953) is a former general of the People's Liberation Army (PLA) of China. He was chief of the Joint Staff Department of the Central Military Commission from 2017 to 2022. Between 2015 and 2017, he served as the inaugural Commander of the PLA Ground Force. A veteran of the Sino-Vietnamese War, he served in southern China for most of his career and was commander of the Chengdu Military Region between 2013 and 2016.

== Biography ==
Li Zuocheng was born in October 1953 in Anhua County, Hunan. He joined the PLA in 1970 at the age of 17.

In 1978, Li fought in the Sino-Vietnamese War as a company commander in the Guangxi Military District. His unit fought a lengthy engagement with the Vietnamese army that lasted 26 days. He was injured in battle. His unit was named by the Central Military Commission and awarded merit of the first class. In 1982, Li was selected to sit in the Presidium (主席团) of the 12th National Congress of the Chinese Communist Party at age 29.

Li Zuocheng became a division commander by 1994. His division helped in relief efforts of the Guangxi floods in the summer of 1994, and the entire division was awarded merit of the second class. He was promoted to the rank of major general in 1997.

In 1998, 45-year-old Li Zuocheng succeeded Ou Jingu (欧金谷) as Commander of the 41st Group Army. He commanded the 41st Army in the relief efforts of the great Yangtze floods of that year.

Li was appointed Deputy Chief of Staff of the Guangzhou Military Region in 2002. Even though this was technically a lateral move, the transfer was seen as a 'sidelining' of Li, because he was no longer serving on the frontline of command. In December 2007, he was transferred to the Chengdu Military Region and became its Deputy Commander. He attained the rank of lieutenant general in 2009. In August 2013, he was promoted to Commander of the Chengdu Military Region, replacing the retiring general Li Shiming.

On 31 July 2015, Li Zuocheng was promoted to general (shangjiang), alongside nine other officers by Central Military Commission chairman Xi Jinping. After the PLA's re-organization in late 2015, Li was named the inaugural commander of the People's Liberation Army Ground Force.

In August 2017, Li was named by Xi Jinping Chief of the Joint Staff Department of the Central Military Commission.

On 30 May 2020, as the twin national security legislation for Hong Kong and National Anthem Bill for Hong Kong affairs startled the world, Li Zuocheng said that the Chinese government would "resolutely smash" any separatist moves by Taiwan. He spoke at the 15th anniversary of the Anti-Secession Law that gives the PLA a legal basis to take military action against China’s dissentient.

Military offices
Preceded by Meng Jinxi	Deputy Commander of Chengdu Military Region; 2007–2013	Succeeded by Yang Jinshan
Preceded by Li Shiming	Commander of Chengdu Military Region; 2013–2015	Succeeded by Position revoked
New title	Commander of the People's Liberation Army Ground Force; 2015–2017	Succeeded by Han Weiguo
Preceded by Fang Fenghui	Chief of the Joint Staff Department of the Central Military Commission; 2017–2022	Succeeded by Liu Zhenli
