= Fourth Army (National Revolutionary Army) =

The Fourth Army (simplified Chinese: 国民革命军第四军; traditional Chinese: 國民革命軍第四軍; pinyin: guómín gémìngjūn dìsìjūn) was a combat command of the National Revolutionary Army involved in the Northern Expedition of the Chinese Civil War. The Fourth Army was commanded by CPC commander Ye Ting.

== Northern Expedition ==
In September, 1925, Ye Ting was appointed regimental commander of the Fourth Army. In May, 1926, the Fourth Army participated in the advance party of the Northern Expedition. Embarking from Zhaoqing (肇慶), Xinhui (新會), the Fourth Army pushed onwards towards the Hunan front against Northern warlord Wu Peifu.

On June 5, 1926, the independent regiment attacks and occupies Youshen (攸縣城), Hunan (湖南). On July 20, 1926, the Fourth Army attacks and occupies Liuyang (瀏陽).

On December 25, 1937 the New Fourth Army was established in Hankou, which was named after the late Fourth Army.
