= Wang Xibin =

Chinese general

- 王喜斌

President of the PLA National Defence University
- In office September 2007 – July 2013
- Preceded by: Ma Xiaotian
- Succeeded by: Song Puxuan

Personal details
- Born: February 1948 (age 78) China
- Party: Chinese Communist Party
- Education: PLA Army Armored Force Academy

Military service
- Allegiance: People's Republic of China
- Branch/service: People's Liberation Army Ground Force
- Years of service: 1966–2013
- Rank: General

Wang Xibin (Chinese: 王喜斌; pinyin: Wáng Xǐbīn; born February 1948) is a retired general in the Chinese People's Liberation Army (PLA). He served as president of the PLA National Defense University from 2007 to 2013.

== Biography ==
Born in Ning'an, Heilongjiang province, Wang joined the PLA in January 1966. He graduated from the Academy of Armor Engineering, majoring in military command. He served as chief of staff of the 38th Group Army of the PLA. In December 2000, he became the commander of the 27th Group Army. In December 2005, he was promoted to chief of staff of the Beijing Military Region. In September 2007, he was appointed as president of the PLA National Defense University. He was made a lieutenant general in July 2007, and a full general in July 2010. He was a member of the 17th Central Committee of the Chinese Communist Party.

=== Downfall ===
In February 2017, it was announced that he was under investigation for corruption.

Military offices
Preceded by Qiu Jinkai	Commander of the 27th Group Army; 1998–2005	Succeeded by Qin Weijiang
Preceded by Qiu Jinkai	Chief of Staff of the Beijing Military Region; 2005–2007	Succeeded by Zhang Baoshu
Preceded by Ma Xiaotian	President of the PLA National Defence University; 2007–2013	Succeeded by Song Puxuan
