= Northern Theater Command =

Military regional command of China

- 北部战区
- Founded: 1 February 2016; 10 years ago
- Country: China
- Type: Theater Command
- Role: Command and control
- Part of: People's Liberation Army
- Headquarters: Shenyang, Liaoning Province
- Website: Official website

Commanders
- Commander: General Huang Ming
- Political Commissar: General Zheng Xuan
- Chief of Staff: Vice Admiral Jiang Guoping

Insignia
- Sleeve insignia

The Northern Theater Command (Chinese: 北部战区; pinyin: Běibù Zhànqū) is one of the five theater commands of the People's Liberation Army, founded on 1 February 2016. Its predecessor is the Shenyang Military Region, Jinan Military Region and Beijing Military Region. Its headquarters is in the Heping District of Shenyang, Liaoning Province. The Northern Theater Command shares borders with North Korea, Russia and Mongolia.

The Northern Theater Command's area of responsibility includes Mongolia, Russian Siberia, Korea and Japan, as well as the Bohai Bay, Yellow Sea and Sea of Japan.

== structure ==
The Northern Theater Command consists of the following components:

- Northern Theater Command Ground Force, located at Jinan, Shandong
  - 78th Group Army (Harbin, Heilongjiang, formerly 16th Group Army);
  - 79th Group Army (Shenyang, Liaoning, formerly 39th Group Army);
  - 80th Group Army (Weifang, Shandong, formerly 26th Group Army).
- North Sea Fleet/Northern Theater Command Navy, headquartered in Qingdao, Shandong.
  - Huludao Naval Base
  - Jianggezhuang Naval Base
  - Lüshun Naval Base
  - Dalian Base
  - Yantai Base
  - Yuchi Naval Base
- Northern Theater Command Air Force, headquartered at Shenyang, Liaoning.

Unit	Bases	Combat Series Number	Make
1st Fighter Division	Anshan (1st Regiment, 3rd Regiment), Chifeng (2nd Regiment)	1XX2X	J-11B (1st Regiment), J-10A (2nd Regiment), J-8F (3rd Regiment)
11th Division (Ground Support)	Siping (31st Regiment), Dalian (32nd Regiment)	2XX2X	JH-7A (31st Regiment), Q-5 (32nd Regiment)
16th Division (Specialised)	Shengyang (46th Regiment, 47th Regiment), Shenyang (48th Regiment)	2XX7X	JQ-8 (46th Regiment), Y-8 (47th Regiment) Y-8, Z-9 (48th Regiment)
21st Division (Air Combat)	Mudanjiang, Qiqihar, Yanbian	3XX2X	J-8H, J-7, Jiaolian-9; J-7; J-7
Dalian Base	Dandong (88th Brigade), Pulandian (89th Brigade), Yingchengzi (90th Brigade)	4XX1X	J-7E (88th Brigade), J-11A/BS (89th Brigade)
4th Brigade (Radar)	Qingdao		
5th Aviation Division	Weifang (13th Regiment, 15th Regiment) Zhucheng (14th Regiment)	1XX6X	Q-5 (13th Regiment, 14th Regiment), JH-7A (15th Regiment)
12th Fighter Aviation Division	Wendeng	2XX3X	J-7, J-10A (36th Regiment), (J-8)
19th Division (Air Combat)	Jining	3XX0X	J-11B (55th Regiment), Su-27SK/UBK/J-11A

== List of leaders ==
=== Commanders ===
English name	Chinese name	Took office	Left office	Notes
Song Puxuan	宋普选	February 2016	September 2017	
Li Qiaoming	李桥铭	September 2017	September 2022	
Wang Qiang	王强	September 2022	August 2024	
Huang Ming	黄铭	August 2024	Incumbent	

=== Political commissars ===
English name	Chinese name	Took office	Left office	Notes
Chu Yimin	褚益民	February 2016	April 2017	
Fan Xiaojun	范骁骏	April 2017	January 2022	
Liu Qingsong	刘青松	January 2022	June 2023	
Zheng Xuan	郑璇	June 2023	Incumbent	

== See also ==
- Northern Theater Command Ground Force
- Northern Theater Command Air Force
- Northern Theater Command Navy/North Sea Fleet
