= Ding Sheng (general) =

Chinese politician (1913–1999)

- 丁盛
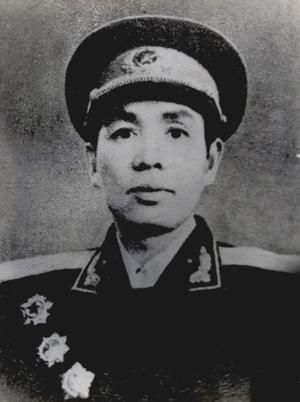

6th Governor of Guangdong
- In office April 1972 – April 1974
- Preceded by: Liu Xingyuan
- Succeeded by: Zhao Ziyang

Personal details
- Born: 7 November 1913 Yudu, Jiangxi, China
- Died: 25 September 1999 (aged 85) Guangzhou
- Party: Chinese Communist Party

Ding Sheng (Chinese: 丁盛; 1913–1999) was a Chinese general and politician. He served as the Governor of China's Guangdong province from 1972 until 1974.

Ding Sheng joined the Chinese Communist Party in 1932. He was already an army officer with the Red Army. He participated in the Long March as well as the Second Sino-Japanese War, Chinese Civil War and Sino-Indian War.

He died in 1999 in Guangzhou.
