= Song Puxuan =

Chinese general

- 宋普选
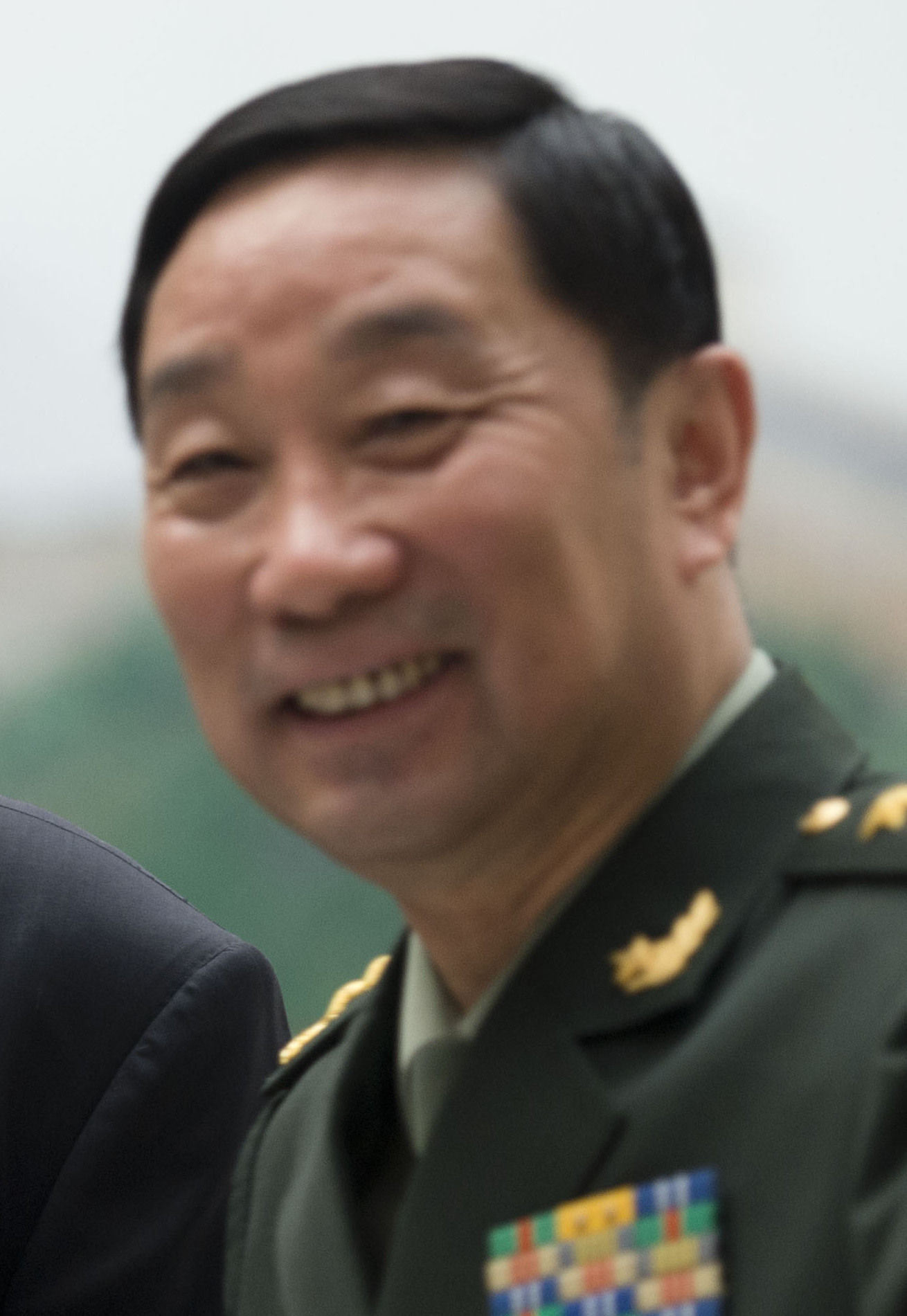

Director of the CMC Logistic Support Department
- In office September 2017 – April 2019
- Preceded by: Zhao Keshi
- Succeeded by: Gao Jin

Commander of the Northern Theater Command
- In office February 2016 – September 2017
- Preceded by: New office
- Succeeded by: Li Qiaoming

Commander of the Beijing Military Region
- In office December 2014 – January 2016
- Preceded by: Zhang Shibo
- Succeeded by: Office abolished

President of the PLA National Defence University
- In office July 2013 – December 2014
- Preceded by: Wang Xibin
- Succeeded by: Zhang Shibo

Personal details
- Born: March 1954 (age 72) Boxing County, Shandong, China
- Party: Chinese Communist Party
- Education: PLA National Defence University; Shandong University

Military service
- Allegiance: People's Republic of China
- Branch/service: People's Liberation Army Ground Force
- Years of service: 1969–2019
- Rank: General

Chinese name
- Simplified Chinese: 宋普选
- Traditional Chinese: 宋普選
Transcriptions
Standard Mandarin
- Hanyu Pinyin: Sòng Pǔxuǎn

Song Puxuan (Chinese: 宋普选; born March 1954) is a retired general of the Chinese People's Liberation Army (PLA). He served as director of the Logistic Support Department of the Central Military Commission from 2017 to 2019. Prior to that, he served as commander of the Northern Theater Command, commander of the Beijing Military Region, deputy commander of the Nanjing Military Region, president of the PLA National Defence University.

== Biography ==
Song Puxuan was born in March 1954 in Boxing County, Shandong Province. He joined the PLA in 1969, and served in the Jinan Military Region for decades. He later rose to become a division commander in the 67th Group Army, chief of staff of the 54th Group Army, and deputy chief of staff of the Jinan Military Region. He has a bachelor's degree from the PLA National Defence University and a graduate degree in Marxist philosophy from Shandong University.

Song attained the rank of major general in 2002. In 2006, he succeeded Huang Hanbiao as commander of the elite 54th Group Army, which is nicknamed the "Iron Army". In 2008, the 54th Group Army participated in the relief efforts of the Great Sichuan earthquake under his leadership.

In 2009, Song was promoted to deputy commander of the Nanjing Military Region, succeeding lieutenant general Xu Chengyun, who had retired. He attained the rank of lieutenant general in 2010. In July 2013, Song was appointed president of the PLA National Defence University, replacing Wang Xibin. In December 2014, he replaced lieutenant general Zhang Shibo as commander of the Beijing Military Region, while Zhang took over Song's old position as president of the PLA National Defence University. It was considered an extraordinary move by paramount leader Xi Jinping, as Song is not a member of the 18th Central Committee, while most past commanders of the key Beijing MR, including Zhang Shibo, had been Central Committee members.

On 31 July 2015, Song Puxuan was promoted to general (shangjiang), the highest rank for Chinese military officers in active service.

Song was the chief commander of the 2015 China Victory Day Parade marking the 70th anniversary of the victory over Japan. On February 1, 2016, he was named commander of the re-organized Northern Theater Command.

Military offices
| Preceded by Xu Chengyun | Deputy Commander of the Nanjing Military Region; 2009–2013 | Succeeded by You Haitao |
| Preceded by Wang Xibin | President of the PLA National Defence University; 2013–2014 | Succeeded by Zhang Shibo |
| Preceded by Zhang Shibo | Commander of the Beijing Military Region; 2014–2016 | Succeeded by Office abolished |
| New title | Commander of the Northern Theater Command; 2016–2017 | Succeeded by Li Qiaoming |
| Preceded by Zhao Keshi | Director of the Logistic Support Department of the Central Military Commission; 2017–2019 | Succeeded by Gao Jin |
