= Liu Zhenli (general) =

Chinese general

- 刘振立
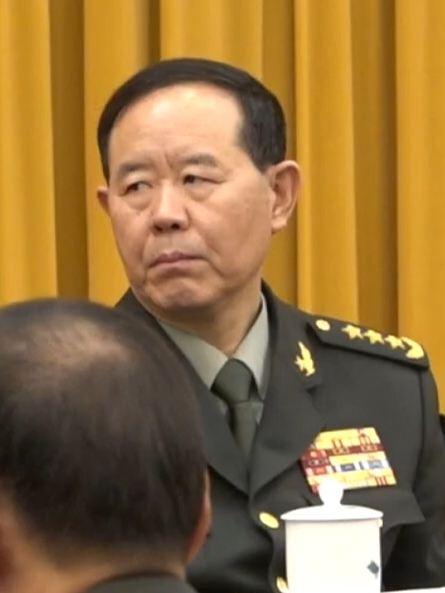

Chief of Staff of the Joint Staff Department of the Central Military Commission
- In office September 2022 – August 2026
- Preceded by: Li Zuocheng

Commander of the People's Liberation Army Ground Force
- In office June 2021 – September 2022
- Preceded by: Han Weiguo
- Succeeded by: Li Qiaoming

Chief of Staff of the People's Liberation Army Ground Force
- In office December 2015 – June 2021
- Preceded by: Office established
- Succeeded by: Huang Ming

Chief of Staff of People's Armed Police
- In office July 2015 – December 2015
- Preceded by: Niu Zhizhong
- Succeeded by: Qin Tian

Personal details
- Born: August 1964 (age 62) Luancheng County, Hebei, China
- Party: Chinese Communist Party (1984-2026, expelled)
- Education: PLA National Defence University

Military service
- Allegiance: People's Republic of China
- Branch/service: People's Liberation Army Ground Force
- Years of service: 1983–2026
- Rank: General (expelled in 2026)
- Battles/wars: Sino-Vietnamese conflicts (1979–1991)

Chinese name
- Simplified Chinese: 刘振立
- Traditional Chinese: 劉振立
Transcriptions
Standard Mandarin
- Hanyu Pinyin: Liǘ Zhènlì

Liu Zhenli (Chinese: 刘振立; born August 1964) is a former Chinese general (Shangjiang) of the People's Liberation Army (PLA), who served as chief of staff of the Joint Staff Department of the Central Military Commission from 2022 to 2026. He was previously the commander of the People's Liberation Army Ground Force from June 2021 to December 2022.

He was a member of the 19th Central Committee of the Chinese Communist Party, and a delegate to the 12th National People's Congress. In 2026, Liu was expelled from the Chinese Communist Party.

== Biography ==
Liu was born in Luancheng County, Hebei, in August 1964. He enlisted in the People's Liberation Army in September 1983 and joined the Chinese Communist Party (CCP) in April 1984. He graduated from the PLA National Defence University. In 1986, he participated in the Sino-Vietnamese conflicts (1979–1991). In the war, he and his men successfully defended the line against repeated People's Army of Vietnam assaults 36 times.

He was chief of staff of the 65th Group Army in December 2009, commander of the army in February 2012, and commander of the 38th Group Army in March 2014. He was transferred to the People's Armed Police in July 2015 and appointed chief of staff. In December 2015, he became the first chief of staff of the newly reshuffled People's Liberation Army Ground Force. In June 2021, he was made commander of the army. In September 2022, he was commissioned as chief of staff of the Joint Staff Department of the Central Military Commission.

He was promoted to the rank of major general (Shaojiang) in December 2010, lieutenant general (Zhongjiang) in July 2016, and general (Shangjiang) in July 2021.

=== Downfall ===
On 24 January 2026, the Ministry of National Defense announced that Liu and Central Military Commission Vice Chairman Zhang Youxia have been placed under investigation due to a decision by the CCP Central Committee over suspected "serious violations of discipline." The People's Liberation Army Daily published an editorial stating that Zhang and Liu had "severely trampled on and undermined the CMC Chairman responsibility system".

The Jamestown Foundation published a detailed analysis of open-source publications and reports from the Ministry of National Defense, Xinhua, People's Daily, and PLA Daily. The report speculated that the charges against Zhang and Liu—likely stemming from the same underlying cause—were political accusations related to their open disagreement or defiance with the CMC Chairman responsibility system, having prioritized military effectiveness over excessive political control and resisting directives they assessed as unrealistic, particularly CCP general secretary Xi Jinping's demands that the PLA be capable of invading Taiwan by 2027, a timeline Zhang reportedly saw as more realistic by 2035. The report rejected claims that Zhang and Liu were charged with corruption or malfeasance, noting that the language of the accusations differed significantly from those brought against He Weidong or Li Shangfu. The report also highlighted growing resistance across the PLA to political interference, including open defiance of Xi's orders, which posed a serious challenge to his authority. The fact that such internal discord became visible within the PLA and even hinted within official statements, underscored its seriousness and likely played a role in Zhang's downfall.

On 28 August 2026, the Standing Committee of the National People's Congress removed Liu from his position as a member of the state Central Military Commission. The NPCSC also removed Liu as a delegate to the 14th National People's Congress. Liu was expelled from the party and military service on 21 September. The investigation found that Liu "formed self-serving cliques, were disloyal and dishonest to the Party, took advantage of their positions to assist others in promotions and accepted a huge sum of bribes in return". On 29 October 2026, the fifth plenary session of the 20th CCP Central Committee reviewed and approved the report of the Discipline Inspection Commission of the Central Military Commission on the "serious violations of discipline and law" by Liu and confirmed the Politburo decision to expel him from the CCP.

Military offices
Preceded by Xu Linping	Commander of the 38th Group Army; 2014–2015	Succeeded by Wang Yinfang
Preceded by Niu Zhizhong	Chief of Staff of People's Armed Police; 2015–2015	Succeeded by Qin Tian
New title	Chief of Staff of the People's Liberation Army Ground Force; 2015–2021	Succeeded by Huang Ming
Preceded by Han Weiguo	Commander of the People's Liberation Army Ground Force; 2021–2022	Succeeded by Li Qiaoming
Preceded by Li Zuocheng	Chief of Staff of the Joint Staff Department of the Central Military Commission; 2022–present	Incumbent
