= Zhurihe Training Base =

Army base in Inner Mongolia, China

Coordinates: 42°15′35″N 112°45′22″E

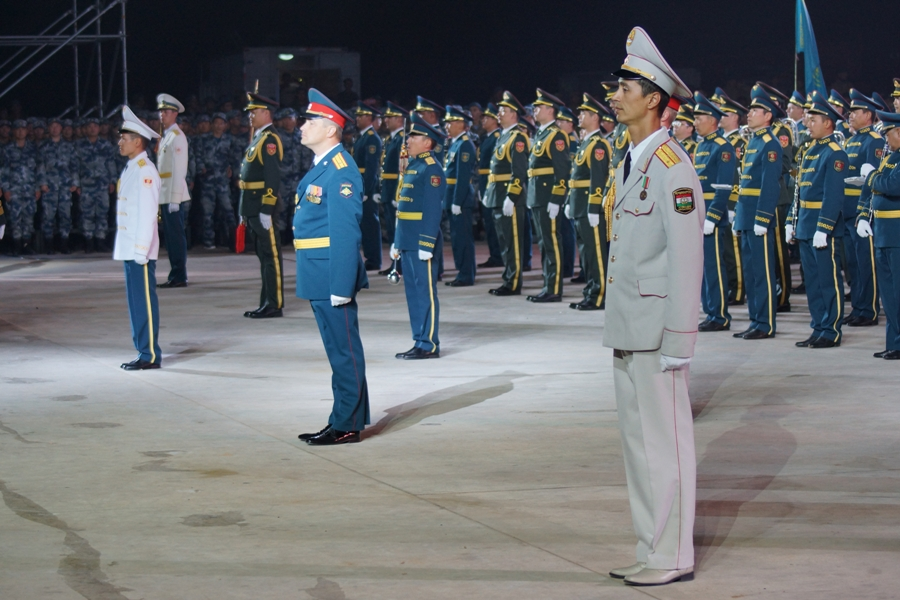
The first edition of the Shanghai Cooperation Organization Military Tattoo (seen here) took place at Zhurihe in 2014.

The Zhurihe Training Base (Chinese: 朱日和训练基地), also called the Zhurihe Combined Tactics Training Base, is a People's Liberation Army (PLA) base in Inner Mongolia, China, founded in 1957. The largest military base in China, Zhurihe covers 1,066 square kilometres (412 sq mi), has its own hospital, and for over 60 years has hosted multiple mock training areas for conducting urban war games. General Secretary and Chairman Xi Jinping commemorated the 90th anniversary of the PLA with a military parade at Zhurihe. The PLA has called Zhurihe their "most modernized training base" and has said it is the largest in Asia. Comparisons have been made between Zhurihe and Fort Irwin in California, United States.

Zhurihe is home to the 81st Army Group. The base is overseen by the PLA's Beijing Military Area Command.

The base features a variety of mock facilities including highways, an airstrip, a town center with buildings—one of which closely resembles the Presidential Office Building in Taipei, Taiwan—and a near-replica of the Eiffel Tower. Many of these structures were built between 2013 and 2015.

In July 1997, the Central Military Commission designated Zhurihe to be modernized and turned into a training base for China. The PLA opened the base to foreign armed forces for the first time on August 25, 2003.
