= Joint Staff Department =

Chinese military command structure

Joint Staff Department of the Central Military Commission
- 中央军委联合参谋部
- Official patch of the Joint Staff Department

Agency overview
- Formed: 11 January 2016; 10 years ago
- Preceding agency: People's Liberation Army General Staff Department
- Type: Functional department of the Central Military Commission
- Jurisdiction: People's Liberation Army
- Headquarters: "August 1st Building", Beijing
- Agency executives: Lt General Zhu Chuansheng, (Acting) Chief of Staff; General Xu Qiling, Deputy Chief of Staff; Lt General Jing Jianfeng, Deputy Chief of Staff; Lt General Cao Qingfeng, Deputy Chief of Staff
- Parent department: Central Military Commission
- Website: chinamil.com.cn

Joint Staff Department
- Simplified Chinese: 中央军委联合参谋部
- Traditional Chinese: 中央軍委聯合參謀部
- Literal meaning: Central Military Commission Joint Staff Department
Transcriptions
Standard Mandarin
- Hanyu Pinyin: Zhōngyāng jūnwěi liánhé cānmóu bù

The Joint Staff Department of the Central Military Commission (JSDCMC) (Chinese: 中央军委联合参谋部) is the operational command organ of the People's Liberation Army (PLA), superseding the former PLA General Staff Department. It was established on 11 January 2016, under the military reforms of Central Military Commission (CMC) chairman Xi Jinping.

Headquartered in Beijing, the Joint Staff Department (JSD) is under the absolute leadership of the CMC and likely serves as an institutional link between members of the CMC and post-2016 PLA theater commands. According to the JSD, its main duties include carrying out combat support planning and combat command support, studying and formulating military strategy and requirements, organizing combat capability assessment, arranging and instructing joint training; and combat readiness and routine war preparedness work.

== Organization ==
Prior to the 2016 transition, the General Staff Department comprised the following bureaus:

- Combat Operations Command
- Combat Communications
- Intelligence
- Mobilization
- Electronic Warfare
- Foreign Relations
- Management

Within the present Joint Staff Department are the following bureaus:

- General Office (办公厅)
- Guard Bureau (警卫局)
- Political Work Bureau (政治工作局)
- Operations Bureau (作战局)
- Strategic Campaign Training Bureau (战略战役训练局)
- Intelligence Bureau (情报局)
- Navigation Bureau (导航局)
- Information and Communications Bureau (信息通信局)
- Battlefield Environmental Protection Bureau (战场环境保障局)
- Military Requirements Bureau (军事需求局)

The Intelligence Bureau of the Joint Staff Department, formerly the 2nd Bureau or '2PLA' under the GSD, is the most well-known bureau subordinate to the JSD for its role in espionage.

== List of chiefs ==
From 2022 to August 2026, the Chief of Joint Staff Department was General Liu Zhenli. The current deputy chiefs are Lieutenant General Xu Qiling, Major General Shao Yuanming and Lieutenant General Cao Qingfeng. Prior to the 2016 rename, department heads were referred to in English as Chief of the General Staff or Chief of the General Staff Department.

=== General Staff Department ===
No.	Portrait	Chief	Took office	Left office	Time in office	Defence branch	Ref.
1	Su Yu粟裕	Senior General; Su Yu 粟裕 (1907–1984)	October 1954	October 1958	4 years	PLA Ground Force	
2	Huang Kecheng黄克诚	Senior General; Huang Kecheng 黄克诚 (1902–1986)	October 1958	September 1959	11 months	PLA Ground Force	
3	Luo Ruiqing罗瑞卿	Senior General; Luo Ruiqing 罗瑞卿 (1906–1978)	September 1959	December 1965	6 years, 3 months	PLA Ground Force	
4	Yang Chengwu杨成武	General; Yang Chengwu 杨成武 (1914–2004)	December 1965	March 1968	2 years, 3 months	PLA Ground Force	
5	Huang Yongsheng黄永胜	General; Huang Yongsheng 黄永胜 (1910–1983)	March 1968	September 1971	3 years, 6 months	PLA Ground Force	
Vacant; 1971–1975
6	Deng Xiaoping邓小平	Deng Xiaoping 邓小平 (1904–1997)	January 1975	March 1980	5 years, 2 months	PLA Ground Force	
7	Yang Dezhi杨得志	General; Yang Dezhi 杨得志 (1911–1994)	March 1980	November 1987	7 years, 8 months	PLA Ground Force	
8	Chi Haotian迟浩田	General; Chi Haotian 迟浩田 (born 1929)	November 1987	November 1992	5 years	PLA Ground Force	
9	Zhang Wannian张万年	General; Zhang Wannian 张万年 (1928–2015)	November 1992	September 1995	2 years, 10 months	PLA Ground Force	
10	Fu Quanyou傅全有	General; Fu Quanyou 傅全有 (born 1930)	September 1995	November 2002	7 years, 2 months	PLA Ground Force	
11	Liang Guanglie梁光烈	General; Liang Guanglie 梁光烈 (1940–2024)	November 2002	September 2007	4 years, 10 months	PLA Ground Force	
12	Chen Bingde陈炳德	General; Chen Bingde 陈炳德 (born 1941)	September 2007	October 2012	5 years, 1 month	PLA Ground Force	
13	Fang Fenghui房峰辉	General; Fang Fenghui 房峰辉 (born 1951)	October 2012	January 2016	3 years, 3 months	PLA Ground Force	

=== Joint Staff Department ===
No.	Portrait	Chief	Took office	Left office	Time in office	Defence branch	Ref.
13	Fang Fenghui房峰辉	General; Fang Fenghui 房峰辉 (born 1951)	11 January 2016	26 August 2017	1 year, 227 days	PLA Ground Force	
14	Li Zuocheng李作成	General; Li Zuocheng 李作成 (born 1953)	26 August 2017	16 October 2022	5 years, 51 days	PLA Ground Force	
15	Liu Zhenli刘振立	General; Liu Zhenli 刘振立 (born 1964)	6 March 2023	28 August 2026	3 years, 175 days	PLA Ground Force	
