= Chengdu Military Region =

Former military region of China

- Chengdu Military Region (highlighted)
- Simplified Chinese: 成都军区
- Traditional Chinese: 成都軍區
Transcriptions
Standard Mandarin
- Hanyu Pinyin: Chéngdū Jūnqū

The Chengdu Military Region was one of seven military districts and is located in the southwest of the People's Republic of China, covering Chongqing, Sichuan, Yunnan, Guizhou, and the Xizang/Tibet Autonomous Region. It includes some of the area previously within the Kunming Military Region and has its headquarters in Chengdu. It was probably established in 1955.

The Tibet Military Region was reduced to the status of a district in 1971.

The region was disbanded during the 2015 People's Republic of China military reform and become part of the Western Theater Command.

== Organisation ==
In 2005, the International Institute for Strategic Studies attributed the region with some 180,000 personnel, with four motorised infantry divisions, one artillery division, two armoured brigades, one artillery brigade, and two anti-aircraft brigades.

Blasko estimated in 2013 that the region consisted of the:

- 13th Group Army (zh:中国人民解放军第13集团军)
  - 37th Infantry Division ('Red Army Division') (Chongqing)
  - 149th Mechanized Infantry Division at Leshan, Sichuan
  - Armoured Brigade (Pengzhou, Sichuan)
  - Artillery Brigade (Chongzhou, Sichuan)
  - AAA Brigade (Mianyang, Sichuan)
  - 2nd Army Aviation Regiment (Chengdu)
  - 'Cheetah' Special Operations Dadui

In 2009, Sino-Defence.com also said an Engineer Regiment, a Signal Regiment, and an Electronic Warfare Regiment were part of the army. The 149th Division joined the reorganising 13th Group Army on the disbandment of the 50th Army in 1985.

- 14th Group Army (zh:中国人民解放军第14集团军)
  - 31st Infantry Division (Dali, Yunnan)
  - 40th Infantry Division (Kaiyuan)
  - Armoured Brigade (Kunming)
  - Artillery Brigade (Kunming)
  - AAA Brigade (Kunming)
  - 29th Chemical Defence Regiment

In 2009, Sino-Defence.com said also a Signal Regiment, an Engineer Regiment, and a Pontoon Bridge Regiment were part of the army.

- Tibet Military District with the 52nd Mountain Motorized Infantry Brigade, 53rd Mountain Motorized Infantry Brigade (both at Nyingchi, Xizang)), the 54th Mechanized Infantry Brigade (Lhasa), a Signals Regiment, and three military sub-districts, the Shannan Military Sub-District, the Xigaze Military Sub-District, and the Nyingchi Military Sub District.

Also reported are the 38th and 41st Armed Mobile Police Divisions of the People's Armed Police.

The military districts that fall within the Chengdu Military Region were:

- Sichuan Provincial Military District (2nd Independent Division of Sichuan Provincial Military District (People's Republic of China) disbanded in 1976)
- Tibet Military District
- Guizhou Provincial Military District

The Chengdu Military Region Air Force was originally established in 1950 as the Xinan (Southwest) MRAF and was established in Chengdu, but when the Military Region HQ moved to Wuhan in May 1955 it was redesignated as the Wuhan MRAF. The Chengdu MRAF Command Post was established on 20 October 1965 and became the Chengdu MRAF on 15 August 1985.

In 1960, the Kunming MRAF CP was formed, abolished in 1976 but the 5th Air Corps staff was moved to Kunming that year and the MRAF CP was retitled the 5th Air Corps. 5th Air Corps became the Kunming MRAF CP in 1978, and then the Command Post was renamed a Base at some time after 1993.

== Officers ==
- General Li Zuocheng (Commander), from July 2013
- Lieutenant General Zhu Fuxi (Political Commissar), from October 2012
- Rong Guiqing (戎贵卿, Chief of Staff)

Lieutenant General (zhong jiang) Yang Jinshan served as the Deputy Commander of Chengdu Military Region between July 2013 to October 2014, and Commander of Tibet Military District from December 2009 to July 2013.

== Nickname ==
Organizations affiliated with the Chengdu Military Region often used the nickname "banner" (Chinese: 战旗; pinyin: zhànqí; lit. 'battle flag'), including the Banner Performance Troupe (Chinese: 战旗文工团) and the Banner Newspaper (Chinese: 战旗报).
