= Military parades in Hong Kong =

List of military parades held in Hong Kong since 1945

This is a list of military parades held in Hong Kong since 1945.

== British Hong Kong ==
=== 1945 ===
The first parade of British Forces Overseas Hong Kong since the reclamation of Hong Kong from Japanese rule took place on 9 October 1945 near The Cenotaph. The parade saw personnel of the Royal Navy, British Army and Royal Air Force take part, as well as troops from the Republic of China.

=== 1996 ===
The last Royal Air Force parade in the territory took place on 15 September 1996, on the 56th anniversary of the Battle of Britain. The parade was conducted by the No. 28 Squadron RAF. The unit was the last of its kind to be pulled out of Hong Kong ahead of the transfer ceremony the following July. It was attended by Chief Secretary for Administration Anson Chan and Commander of British Forces in Hong Kong Bryan Dutton.

=== 1997 ===
An evening parade at HMS Tamar was held during the Hong Kong handover ceremony on 30 June. It included a farewell address by Governor Chris Patten as well as an address by Charles, Prince of Wales on behalf of Queen Elizabeth II.

== Hong Kong SAR ==
=== 1998 ===
On 7 May 1998, the first military parade of the People's Liberation Army Hong Kong Garrison took place on Stonecutters Island at Ngong Shuen Chau Naval Base to commemorate the 1st anniversary of the HKSAR's establishment. It was attended by Jiang Zemin who was Chairman of the Central Military Commission and was on his second visit to the region.

=== 2004 ===
On 1 August 2004, the first military parade on PLA Day in the entire PRC took place. The 3,000-strong parade specifically marked the 77th anniversary of the founding of the PLA. The parade was presided by the PLA commander in HKSAR, General Wang Jitang. It also saw the unprecedented attendance of anti-CPC lawmakers in the Legislative Council of Hong Kong at the parade. Beginning at 10:30 that morning, the parade began with the performance of March of the Volunteers and was concluded with a performance by the PLA Hong Kong Band. It was the first major appearance for the PLA Hong Kong Garrison Honour Guard Battalion, which was formed back in the fall of 1997.

=== 2007 ===
It took place on Stonecutters and celebrated the CCP's 80th anniversary and the HKSAR's 10th anniversary. It was the first to be held on Hong Kong Special Administrative Region Establishment Day.

=== 2012 ===
It was commanded by General Zhang Shibo and was presided over by Central Military Commission chairman Hu Jintao. It celebrated HKSAR's 15th anniversary.

=== 2015 ===
A parade in honor of the platinum jubilee of the end of World War II took place on V-J Day in 2015. It took place with the participation of cadet/ youth organizations as well as the Hong Kong Police Force. It was attended by Lau Kong-wah as the presiding officer in his position as Secretary for Home Affairs. The parade route went through Kowloon Park in Tsim Sha Tsui.

=== 2017 ===
The parade was held in honor of the 20th anniversary of the accession of Hong Kong into the PRC and the 90th anniversary of the PLA. It was commanded by General Tan Benhong and attended by Central Military Commission chairman Xi Jinping. It was the largest parade in the HKSAR's existence, being held at Shek Kong Airfield in the presence of 20 formations including one from Shenzhen Military Base. The 20 formations accounted for over 3,000 troops combined. 60 armoured vehicles, 61 vehicles that specialised in surveillance, command, communications, defence, engineering, missile delivery, interference and field rescue and prevention. Twelve types of military helicopters were on show.

It was also the first to include the new military greeting Hello Comrades!, to which the troops respond with Hello Chairman!. This was a replacement of the greeting used since the 35th anniversary of parade on Tiananmen Square in 1984 when Hello Leader! was the response by troops.

== See also ==
- Chinese National Day Parade
- 2015 China Victory Day Parade
- 2017 PLA Day Parade
