= Liu Dingxin =

- 刘鼎新

Political Commissar of the PLA Hainan Military District
- In office August 2007 – July 2012
- Commander: Wang Xiaojun; Li Shilin; Tan Benhong
- Preceded by: He Xianshu
- Succeeded by: Liu Xin

Director of the Political Department of PLA Hainan Military District
- In office March 2003 – October 2006
- Preceded by: Li Jun'an
- Succeeded by: Lü Qiang

Personal details
- Born: August 1958 (age 68) You County, Hunan, China
- Party: Chinese Communist Party
- Education: Guangxi Normal University; Sun Yat-sen University

Military service
- Allegiance: People's Republic of China
- Branch/service: People's Liberation Army Ground Force
- Years of service: 1972–2012
- Rank: Major general

Chinese name
- Simplified Chinese: 刘鼎新
- Traditional Chinese: 劉鼎新
Transcriptions
Standard Mandarin
- Hanyu Pinyin: Liú Dǐngxīn

Liu Dingxin (Chinese: 刘鼎新; born August 1952) is a major general in the People's Liberation Army of China who served as political commissar of the PLA Hainan Military District from 2007 to 2012.

Liu was a delegate to the 11th National People's Congress.

== Biography ==
Liu was born in You County, Hunan, in August 1952, and graduated from Guangxi Normal University and Sun Yat-sen University. He enlisted in the People's Liberation Army (PLA) in December 1972, and joined the Chinese Communist Party (CCP) in January 1974.

In March 2003, Liu became director of the Political Department of PLA Hainan Military District, he remained in that position until October 2006, when he was chosen as political commissar of the military district.

Military offices
Preceded by Li Jun'an	Director of the Political Department of PLA Hainan Military District; 2003–2006	Succeeded by Lü Qiang
Preceded by He Xianshu	Political Commissar of the PLA Hainan Military District; 2007–2012	Succeeded by Liu Xin
