= Hainan Military District =

- 中国人民解放军海南省军区
- Founded: July 1950; 75 years ago
- Country: China
- Allegiance: Chinese Communist Party
- Type: Military district
- Role: Command and control
- Part of: People's Liberation Army
- Headquarters: Haikou, Hainan

Commanders
- Commander: Major general (shaojiang) Wang Peijie
- Political Commisar: Major general (shaojiang) Wei Changjin

Chinese name
- Simplified Chinese: 中国人民解放军海南省军区
- Traditional Chinese: 中國人民解放軍海南省軍區
Transcriptions
Standard Mandarin
- Hanyu Pinyin: Zhōngguó Rénmín Jiěfàngjūn Hǎinánshěng Jūnqū

The Hainan Military District (Chinese: 中国人民解放军海南省军区; full name People's Liberation Army Hainan Military District or PLA Hainan Military District) is a military district of the National Defense Mobilization Department of the Central Military Commission in China.

== History ==
Hainan Military District was established in July 1950.

== Leaders ==
=== Commanders ===
| Name (English) | Name (Chinese) | Tenure begins | Tenure ends | Note |
|---|---|---|---|---|
| Feng Baiju | 冯白驹 | July 1950 | July 1952 | |
| Wu Kehua | 吴克华 | July 1952 | April 1954 | |
| Liang Xingchu | 梁兴初 | April 1954 | April 1955 | |
| Wu Ruilin | 吴瑞林 | April 1955 | September 1957 | |
| Zhuang Tian | 庄田 | September 1957 | June 1960 | |
| Wu Chunren | 吴纯仁 | June 1960 | June 1963 | |
| Sun Ganqing | 孙干卿 | June 1963 | November 1969 | |
| Jiang Xueshan | 江雪山 | November 1969 | November 1979 | |
| Jiang Hai | 江海 | November 1979 | May 1983 | |
| Pang Weiqiang | 庞为强 | May 1983 | May 1990 | |
| Xiao Xuchu | 肖旭初 | June 1990 | July 1997 | |
| Liang Jiqiu | 梁计秋 | July 1997 | August 2001 | |
| Li Bixing | 李必兴 | August 2001 | March 2004 | |
| Wang Xiaojun | 王晓军 | March 2004 | June 2008 | |
| Li Shilin | 黎仕林 | June 2008 | January 2011 | |
| Tan Benhong | 谭本宏 | February 2011 | July 2014 | |
| Zhang Jian | 张践 | September 2014 | January 2016 | |
| Chen Shoumin | 陈守民 | May 2016 | December 2019 | |
| Yang Zheng | 杨征 | December 2019 | October 2021 | |
| Wang Peijie | 王培杰 | October 2021 | | |

=== Political commissars ===
| Name (English) | Name (Chinese) | Tenure begins | Tenure ends | Note |
|---|---|---|---|---|
| Feng Baiju | 冯白驹 | July 1950 | July 1952 | |
| Feng Baiju | 冯白驹 | July 1952 | May 1958 | First Political Commissar |
| Chen Renqi | 陈仁麒 | November 1952 | December 1955 | Second Political Commissar |
| Xie Tangzhong | 谢镗忠 | November 1955 | April 1963 | Second Political Commissar |
| Lin Liming | 林李明 | May 1958 | March 1964 | First Political Commissar |
| Song Weishi | 宋维栻 | March 1963 | January 1965 | |
| Yang Zejiang | 杨泽江 | March 1964 | April 1968 | First Political Commissar |
| Wei Youzhu | 魏佑铸 | January 1965 | August 1967 | |
| Feng Jingqiao | 冯镜桥 | February 1968 | December 1978 | First Political Commissar |
| Wang Liang | 王亮 | November 1968 | December 1978 | Second Political Commissar |
| Zhou Yikuan | 周益宽 | May 1970 | June 1975 | |
| Li Peng | 李鹏 | December 1978 | March 1983 | |
| Luo Tian | 罗天 | February 1980 | February 1983 | First Political Commissar |
| Wang Xing | 王星 | May 1983 | August 1985 | |
| Yao Wenxu | 姚文绪 | February 1984 | March 1986 | First Political Commissar |
| Liu Guinan | 刘桂楠 | August 1985 | 1989 | |
| Gong Pingqiu | 龚平秋 | January 1989 | March 1994 | |
| Zhou Chuantong | 周传统 | March 1994 | January 2001 | |
| He Xianshu | 贺贤书 | January 2001 | August 2007 | |
| Liu Dingxin | 刘鼎新 | August 2007 | July 2012 | |
| Liu Xin | 刘新 | July 2012 | April 2017 | |
| Ye Qing | 叶青 | April 2017 | September 2019 | |
| He Qingfeng | 何清凤 | December 2019 | January 2024 | |
| Wei Changjin | 韦昌进 | January 2024 | | |

=== Chiefs of staff ===
| Name (English) | Name (Chinese) | Tenure begins | Tenure ends | Note |
|---|---|---|---|---|
| Fu Zhenzhong | 符振中 | October 1949 | July 1950 | |
| Zhu Zixiu | 朱子休 | July 1950 | June 1952 | |
| Jiang Xieyuan | 江燮元 | June 1952 | March 1955 | |
| Sun Ganqing | 孙干卿 | June 1954 | October 1955 | |
| Zhao Haoran | 赵浩然 | October 1955 | August 1960 | |
| Feng Jingqiao | 冯镜桥 | April 1961 | August 1963 | |
| Hu Haixiao | 胡海晓 | August 1963 | January 1968 | |
| Meng Yadong | 孟亚东 | January 1968 | November 1969 | |
| Li Yaoxian | 李耀先 | June 1969 | December 1978 | |
| Zhang Liangping | 张良平 | December 1978 | May 1983 | |
| Zhang Deren | 张德仁 | May 1983 | April 1989 | |
| Liu Hesheng | 柳河生 | May 1989 | November 1989 | |
| Zhang Deren | 张德仁 | June 1990 | February 1993 | |
| Li Zerong | 李泽荣 | February 1993 | July 1998 | |
| Yan Liping | 阎力平 | July 1998 | August 2001 | |
| Ni Shanxue | 倪善学 | August 2001 | 2002 | |
| Yang Yonghai | 杨永海 | February 2002 | February 2009 | |
| Li Xinjian | 李欣剑 | February 2009 | November 2010 | |
| Zhang Bing | 张兵 | November 2010 | March 2013 | |
| Yang Zheng | 杨征 | March 2013 | April 2017 | |
