= Mo Hua =

Chinese politician (born 1964)

- 莫桦

Communist Party Secretary of Yulin
- In office June 2021 – March 2023
- Preceded by: Huang Haikun
- Succeeded by: Wang Chen

Personal details
- Born: October 1964 (age 61–62) Teng County, Guangxi, China
- Party: Chinese Communist Party (1989–2024)
- Education: Guangxi University; Guangxi Normal University; Central Party School of the Chinese Communist Party

Chinese name
- Simplified Chinese: 莫桦
- Traditional Chinese: 莫樺
Transcriptions
Standard Mandarin
- Hanyu Pinyin: Mò Huà

Mo Hua (Chinese: 莫桦; born October 1964) is a former Chinese politician who was party secretary of Yulin from 2021 to 2023. As of March 2023, he was under investigation by China's top anti-corruption agency.

He is a representative of the 20th National Congress of the Chinese Communist Party.

== Early life and education ==
Mo was born in Teng County, Guangxi, in October 1964. In 1980, he entered Guangxi Agricultural College (now Guangxi University), where he majored in agricultural economic management.

== Career ==
After graduating in 1984, Mo was despatched to the Price Bureau of Guangxi Zhuang Autonomous Region as an official, and worked there for more than ten years. He joined the Chinese Communist Party (CCP) in January 1989. He was an official in the Planning Commission of Guangxi Zhuang Autonomous Region in February 1995 and subsequently assistant mayor of Guilin in May 1997.

He was appointed deputy party secretary of Xing'an County in December 1997, concurrently serving as a magistrate since August 1998. In January 2001, he was elevated to party secretary of Yongfu County, concurrently holding the chairman of Yongfu County People's Congress position. He was chosen as vice mayor of Beihai in May 2005. He was appointed executive vice mayor of Laibin in January 2010 and was admitted as member of the CCP Laibin Municipal Committee, the city's top authority. He was made deputy director and deputy party branch secretary of the Development and Reform Commission of Guangxi Zhuang Autonomous Region in June 2013 and appointed director of the Industry and Information Technology Commission of Guangxi Zhuang Autonomous Region (now Industry and Information Technology Department of Guangxi Zhuang Autonomous Region) in July 2016. In June 2021, he was appointed party secretary of Yulin, it would be his first job as "first-in-charge" of a prefecture-level city.

== Downfall ==
On 30 March 2023, Mo has been placed under investigation for "serious violations of laws and regulations" by the Central Commission for Discipline Inspection (CCDI), the party's internal disciplinary body, and the National Supervisory Commission, the highest anti-corruption agency of China.

On 25 January 2024, he was expelled from the CCP and removed from public office.

Government offices
Preceded by Shu Hua	Director of the Industry and Information Technology Department of Guangxi Zhuang Autonomous Region; 2016–2021	Succeeded by Hou Gang
Party political offices
Preceded by Huang Haikun	Communist Party Secretary of Yulin; 2021–2023	Succeeded by Wang Chen (王琛)
