= Wang Shuangfei =

Chinese engineer

- 王双飞
- Born: September 1963 (age 62–63); You County, Hunan, China
- Education: South China University of Technology
- Scientific career
- Fields: Papermaking
- Workplaces: Guangxi University

Chinese name
- Simplified Chinese: 王双飞
- Traditional Chinese: 王雙飛
Transcriptions
Standard Mandarin
- Hanyu Pinyin: Wáng Shuāngfēi

Wang Shuangfei (born September 1963) is a Chinese engineer who is a professor at Guangxi University, and an academician of the Chinese Academy of Engineering. He served as a representative of the 19th National Congress of the Chinese Communist Party.

== Biography ==
Wang was born in You County, Hunan, in September 1963. He earned his doctor's degree from South China University of Technology in 1995. He was a postdoctoral fellow at Georgia Tech from 2001 to 2003. He was a visiting scholar at the University of Melbourne in 1999 and the University of British Columbia between 2007 and 2008.

Wang has taught at Guangxi University since June 1995.

== Honors and awards ==
- 2014 National Labor Medal
- 2021 Science and Technology Innovation Award of the Ho Leung Ho Lee Foundation
- 18 November 2021 Member of the Chinese Academy of Engineering (CAE)
