= Peng Xiaochun =

Chinese politician (born 1961)

- 彭晓春

Vice Chairman of the Guangxi Zhuang Autonomous Regional Committee of the Chinese People's Political Consultative Conference
- In office January 2018 – January 2023
- Chairman: Lan Tianli; Sun Dawei

Personal details
- Born: November 1961 (age 64) Hepu County, Guangxi, China
- Party: Chinese Communist Party (1985–2025; expelled)
- Education: Guangxi Normal University; Central China Normal University; Central Party School of the Chinese Communist Party

Chinese name
- Simplified Chinese: 彭晓春
- Traditional Chinese: 彭曉春
Transcriptions
Standard Mandarin
- Hanyu Pinyin: Péng Xiǎochūn

Peng Xiaochun (Chinese: 彭晓春; born November 1961) is a retired Chinese politician who spent most of his career in southwest China's Guangxi. He was investigated by China's top anti-graft agency in June 2025. He has been retired for two years . Previously he served as vice chairman of the Guangxi Zhuang Autonomous Regional Committee of the Chinese People's Political Consultative Conference. He was a representative of the 18th National Congress of the Chinese Communist Party.

== Early life and education ==
Peng was born in Hepu County, Guangxi, in November 1961, and graduated from Guangxi Normal University, Central China Normal University, and the Central Party School of the Chinese Communist Party.

== Career ==
Peng joined the Chinese Communist Party (CCP) in April 1985, and entered the workforce in July 1989. Peng worked in the Office of the CCP Guangxi Zhuang Autonomous Regional Committee before being appointed deputy party secretary of Longzhou County. He briefly served as deputy secretary-general of the CCP Nanning Municipal Committee, and then party secretary of Fusui County, the top political position in the county, beginning in May 1997. He was appointed head of the Publicity Department of the CCP Liuzhou Municipal Committee in July 2000 and was admitted to standing committee member of the CCP Liuzhou Committee, the city's top authority. In September 2004 he was made deputy party secretary of Liuzhou. He was director of the Policy Research Office of the CCP Guangxi Zhuang Autonomous Regional Committee and deputy secretary-general of the CCP Guangxi Zhuang Autonomous Regional Committee in February 2008, in addition to serving as director of the General Office of Guangxi Zhuang Autonomous Region. He became party secretary of Hezhou in January 2010 before being assigned to the similar position in Baise in February 2013. In January 2018, he took office as vice chairman of the Guangxi Zhuang Autonomous Regional Committee of the Chinese People's Political Consultative Conference, the provincial advisory body.

== Investigation ==
On 16 June 2025, Peng was put under investigation for alleged "serious violations of discipline and laws" by the Central Commission for Discipline Inspection (CCDI), the party's internal disciplinary body, and the National Supervisory Commission, the highest anti-corruption agency of China. On December 8, he was expelled from the CCP.

On 29 September 2026, Peng was sentenced to death sentence with reprieve at the Foshan Intermediate People's Court for taking bribes in 263 million yuan.
