= Bai Jianjun =

Chinese general

- 白建军

Chief of Staff of the Beijing Military Region
- In office July 2013 – December 2014
- Preceded by: Wang Ning
- Succeeded by: Shi Luze

Personal details
- Born: January 1958 (age 68) Xuzhou, Jiangsu, China
- Party: Chinese Communist Party
- Education: Military Academy of the General Staff of the Armed Forces of Russia

Military service
- Allegiance: People's Republic of China
- Branch/service: People's Liberation Army Ground Force
- Rank: Lieutenant general

Chinese name
- Simplified Chinese: 白建军
- Traditional Chinese: 白建軍
Transcriptions
Standard Mandarin
- Hanyu Pinyin: Bái Jiànjūn

Bai Jianjun (Chinese: 白建军; born January 1958) is a lieutenant general in the People's Liberation Army of China. He was a delegate to the 13th National People's Congress.

== Biography ==
Bai was born in Xuzhou, Jiangsu, in January 1958, and graduated from the Military Academy of the General Staff of the Armed Forces of Russia. He was deputy head of the Operations Department of the General Staff of the People's Liberation Army in 2003 and deputy commander of the 54th Group Army in 2006. In March 2008, he succeeded Zhang Shibo as commander of the 20th Group Army, leading his troops to participate in 2008 Sichuan earthquake relief work. He became head of the Operations Department of the General Staff of the People's Liberation Army in May 2009, in addition to serving as director of the National Civil Air Defense Office. In July 2013, he was commissioned as chief of staff of the Beijing Military Region, a position he held until December 2014, when he was promoted to deputy commander of the military region. He was chosen as director of the Aftermath Office of the Beijing Military Region in January 2016.

He was promoted to the rank of major general (shaojiang) in 2005 and lieutenant general (zhongjiang) in July 2014.

Military offices
Preceded by Zhang Shibo	Commander of the 20th Group Army; 2008–2013	Succeeded by Xu Jingnian
Preceded by Qi Jianguo	Head of the Operations Department of the General Staff of the People's Liberation Army; 2009–2013	Succeeded by Rao Kaixun
Preceded by Wang Ning	Chief of Staff of the Beijing Military Region; 2013–2014	Succeeded by Shi Luze
