= Jingjiang Princes' Palace =

Historical site in Guangxi, China

- 靖江王府
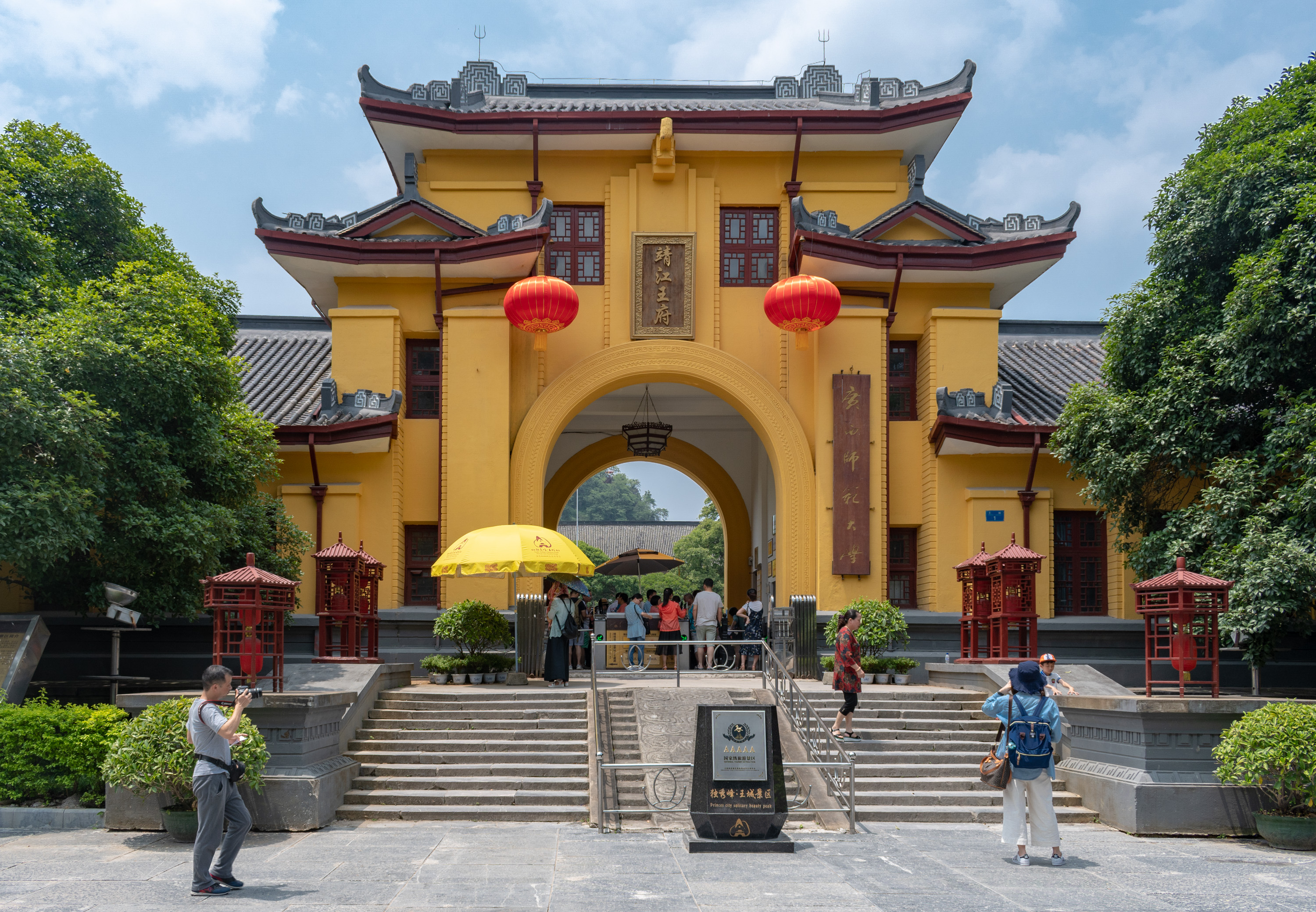
- Chengyun Gate in August 2003

- Location within Guangxi

General information
- Location: Guilin, Guangxi
- Coordinates: 25.1614°N 110.1731°E
- Construction started: 1372
- Completed: 1392

Jingjiang Princes' Palace (Chinese: 靖江王府; pinyin: Jìngjiāng Wángfǔ) is a historical site in Guilin, Guangxi Zhuang Autonomous Region, China. It now functions as both Guangxi Normal University and as a tourist attraction.

== History ==
The Jingjiang Princes' Palace (also known as the Jingjiang Princes' City), commonly known as Wangcheng (Princes' City), is located in the inner city of Guilin and was built between 1372 and 1392 AD during the Ming dynasty close to the Solitary Beauty Peak (Duxiu Feng). It was originally the official residence of Zhu Shouqian – the great-nephew of Zhu Yuanzhang, the first Ming dynasty emperor). After Zhu Shouqian was declared Prince of Jingjiang by Emperor Zhu Yuanzhang, his palace was set at Jingjiang. It took more than 20 years to build the capital, which now has a history of over 630 years and is older than the Forbidden City in Beijing.

During the 257 years from the building of the mansion to the end of Ming dynasty, 14 kings from 12 generations lived here.

Sun Yat-sen stayed there while on the Northern Expedition in 1921. In the winter of 1925, it was established as Yat-sen Park and now is one of the schoolyards of Guangxi Normal University. The carved balustrades and marble steps of the mansion still remain to today.

Over its history of more than 600 years the city was burned down several times, however it remains as the best-preserved Princes' City in China. Notably, the carved balustrades and marble steps still remain. The Chinese Government gave the site national protection status in 1993.

Today the site is occupied by Guangxi Normal University, but remains open to the public as a tourist attraction combining aspects of Guilin's natural environment, history, traditional architecture and local culture.

== Size and layout ==
The Jingjiang Princes' City is magnificent and grandly walled, and once functioned as an 'inner city' occupied by the princes and their families. There are 4 halls, 4 pavilions and 40 other buildings surrounding the main buildings. It occupies a total area of 19.78 hectares (0.08 square miles). The layout of the mansion is, from the south to the north, Imperial Burial Place, Chengyun Palace and Chengyun Gate; from east to west, Imperial Divine Temple and Ancestral Temple. Other buildings are built around the main buildings. All the buildings in Jingjiang Princes'City are decorated with red walls and yellow tiles, which a typical color scheme for Chinese palaces.

There is a 1,500-metre (4,900 ft) long city wall which is built with square bluestones. It is 557.5 metres (1,829 ft) long from south to north and 336 metres (1,102 ft) long from east to west. The city wall is 7.92 metres (26.0 ft) high and has a thickness of 5.5 metres (18 ft). There are four gates in four directions, which are called "Tiren" (Donghua Gate), "Duanli" (Zhengyang Gate), "Zunyi" (Xihua Gate) and "Guangzhi" (Hougong Gate).

The layout of the city strictly conforms to the rules of the Ming dynasty. All buildings are arranged on the axis anchored by the Solitary Beauty Peak in the order of, from the south, Duanli Gate (Entrance Gate), Chengyun Gate (Palace Gate), Chengyun Palace (Administration Building), Royal Quarters, Imperial Garden and Guangzhi Gate (Rear Gate). The subsidiary buildings on both sides of the axis are symmetrical.

The local government has worked to combine aspects of Guilin's natural environment, history, traditional architecture and local culture. Now it is a tourist destination.

== Attractions within the Princes' City ==
=== Solitary Beauty Peak ===
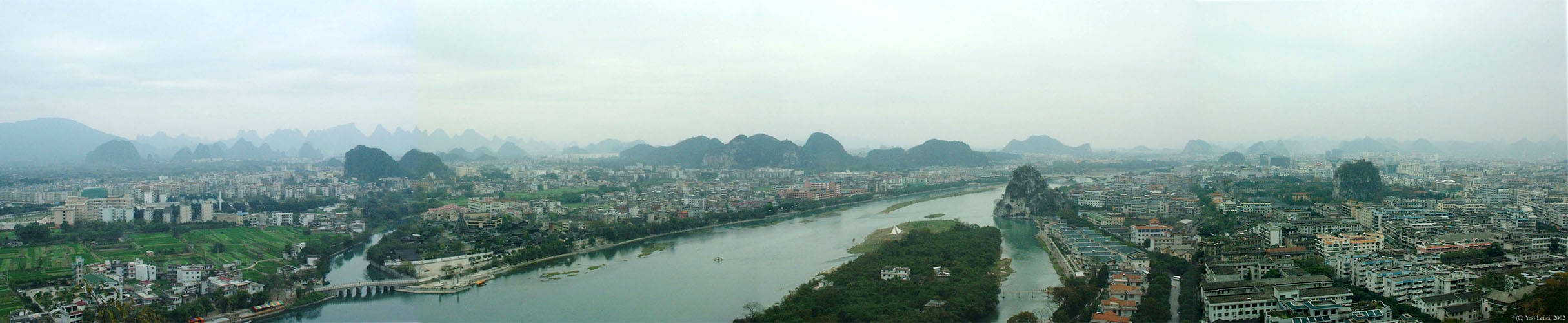
Standing on top of the Solitary Beauty Peak can see a panorama of Guilin.

Jingjiang Princes' City is located beside the Li River. It is a tourist attraction highlighted by the Solitary Beauty Peak and covers the whole Jingjiang Princes' City. Perfectly combining the natural landscape and historical sites, it is praised as a "city in a city" since the ancient time.

The Jingjiang Princes' City scenic area is a highest-grade tourist resource in the Guilin. It is mainly composed of Chengyun (Be Ordained by Heaven) Gate, Chengyun Hall, Bedchamber, Ancestral Temple, The Altar of the Earth and Harvests, pavilions, terraces and towers. The whole city is a building complex decorated with red walls and yellow tiles. Around the Prince City, there is a city wall piled up by strong square green stones. Four city gates are opened in the eastern, western, northern and southern sides, named Tiren (Donghua Gate), Duanli (Zhengyang Gate), Zunyi (Xihua Gate) and Guangzhi (Hougong Gate) respectively. The straight Solitary Beauty Peak stands erect in the city. Yueya (Crescent) Pool is lying at the top of the peak. Move up, visitors can find Xuanwu Pavilion, Kwanyin Hall, Sanke Temple and Sanshen (Three Deities) Ancestral Temple elegantly dotted on the peak.

The Solitary Beauty Peak is often compared to be a king as it erects from the ground like a unique column propping up the blue sky. Its summit offers a panoramic view of Guilin. The well-known description that characterizes Guilin landscape "the scenery in Guilin excels all under the heaven" is among the numerous stone inscription on the cliffs of the Peak. Inside the Peace Cave at the foot of the Peak, there are 60 Chinese zodiacal signs carved on the wall that are considered to be one of the world culture wonder. In the Qing dynasty, JingJiang Princes' City was converted to be the Examination House. JingJiang Princes' City is listed as "the key cultural relics of national level" in 1996.

=== "Zhuangyuan Jidi" Arch ===
The "Zhuangyuan Jidi" Arch (Zhuangyuan; 状元/狀元) was the title conferred on the scholar who came first in the highest imperial examination) is located on the Donghua Gate. The arch was built during the reign of the Qing dynasty (1644–1912) Daoguang Emperor (r. 1820–1850) and ruined during the reign of the Guangxu Emperor (r. 1875–1908). It was built for Long Qirui (龙启瑞). Before Long Qirui was entitled to the title Zhuangyuan, there was someone who also enjoyed the title. In the next four years, there were two Zhuangyuans came from Guilin which shocked everyone in China. Since then, there was a popular saying that "eight Jinshi (An advanced scholar) from one county and two Zhuangyuan from one city". In order to memorize this legend, local authorities rebuilt the "Zhuangyuan Jidi" Arch and carved all the four peoples’ names on the arch. The "Bangyan Jidi" Arch (Bangyan means the second place at palace examinations) is on the Xihua Gate. It was built in memory of Yu Jianzhang(于建章) in the fourth year of the Tongzhi Emperor (r. 1861–1875) during the Qing dynasty.

There had been 14 Jingjiang Princes of 12 generations who lived in the city during the 257 years before it was ruined during the Qing dynasty. The last owner Li Youde buried himself to death in the Qing dynasty. At present, the main buildings of the city are well preserved. The left Chengyun Gate, the platform of Chengyun Palace and other buildings are open for visitors.

=== Study Cave ===
The first poem in praise of Guilin scenery by Yan Yanzhi in the southern Song dynasty (420–479) was engraved here and from where the Peak obtained its name. The most famous line "Guilin scenery excels all" was cliff-engraved here more than 800 years ago.

=== Stone inscription ===
The stone inscriptions on the Solitary Beauty Peak add up to 136 pieces, which were attributed to the VIPs at that time. These inscriptions include calligraphy, painting and documentary records. These works reflect the history of Guilin and represent the essence of culture.

=== Peace Grotto ===
It is a natural grotto at the west foot of the Duxiu Peak and a place for the Jingjiang Princes to worship. The statue of emperor Xuan Wu and 60 God Jiazhi statues are enshrined and worshiped inside the grotto. Among them the carved reproduction of the 60 God Jiazhi statues in the grotto are probably the only ones within the country.

=== Examination House ===
A place blessed with good Feng shui (in Chinese astrology it means good location, good fortune) and numerous top scholars made its fame beat all in the Qing dynasty. The site has been restored as an imperial testing house where tourists can take part in the exam.

=== Confucius Temple ===
The ancient scholars must offer their sacrifices to Confucius before taking the provincial test in the examination house. They pray for passing the test. It is said that the Confucian Temple next to the Examination House is highly efficacious.

=== Couple Tree ===
With branches in the shape of a dragon and a horse, a locust tree and a banyan tree grow tightly together like one sweet couple.

=== Chengyun Palace ===
Originally built in 1372 in the Ming dynasty as the administration office of the city. The palace was burned down twice in the Qing dynasty and during the Japanese invasion. The only originals are the stairs and railings since the current structure was rebuilt in 1947.

=== Fortune Well ===
A well that the examinees in the Examination House in the Qing dynasty regarded as the source of fortune, and from which they would drink the blessed water before they took the exam.
