= Qi Jianguo =

Chinese politician

- 戚建国
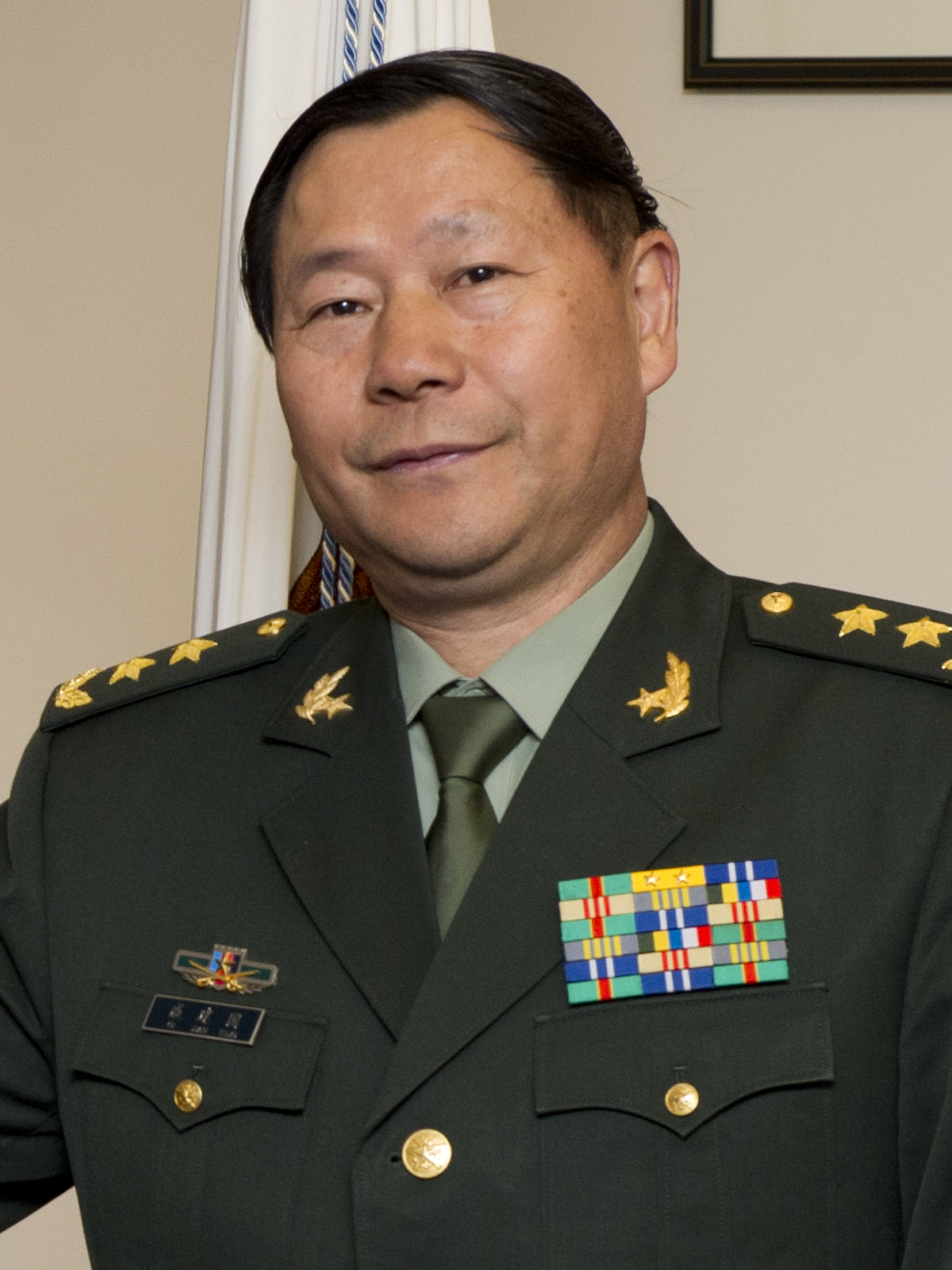
- Qi Jianguo

Deputy Chief of Joint Staff Department of the Central Military Commission
- In office January 2016 – January 2017
- Chief: Fang Fenghui
- Preceded by: New title
- Succeeded by: Ma Yiming

Personal details
- Born: August 1952 (age 73) Wendeng, Shandong, China
- Party: Chinese Communist Party
- Education: Nanjing Army Commander College

Military service
- Allegiance: People's Republic of China
- Branch/service: People's Liberation Army
- Years of service: 1970–2016
- Rank: General
- Battles/wars: Sino-Vietnamese conflicts

Chinese name
- Simplified Chinese: 戚建国
- Traditional Chinese: 戚建國
Transcriptions
Standard Mandarin
- Hanyu Pinyin: Qī Jiànguó

Qi Jianguo (Chinese: 戚建国; born August 1952) is a retired general of the Chinese People's Liberation Army. He served as Deputy Chief of the Joint Staff from 2012 to 2016. He formerly served as Commander of the 12th Group Army. A participant in the Sino-Vietnamese conflicts, he is one of the few serving PLA generals with battle experience.

== Biography ==
Qi Jianguo was born in August 1952 in Wendeng, Shandong Province. In his early years he worked as a sent-down youth in Dengzhou, Henan Province. He joined the PLA in 1970, and graduated from PLA Nanjing Army Commander College (南京陆军指挥学院) with a bachelor's degree.

Qi joined the PLA as an ordinary soldier and rose through the army ranks. He was a battalion commander at the Battle of Laoshan (老山) during the Sino-Vietnamese conflicts. He is one of the few serving generals of the PLA with actual battle experience.

Qi served as Commander of the 12th Group Army from 2002 to 2005, Director of Combat of the Joint Staff Department from 2005 to 2008, Assistant to the Chief of Joint Staff from 2009 to 2012, and was promoted to Deputy Chief of Joint Staff in 2012. He was also chairman of the China Institute for International Strategic Studies (中国国际战略学会), with responsibility for military intelligence and diplomacy, where he succeeded Ma Xiaotian and in 2013 was himself succeeded by Sun Jianguo, a fellow Deputy Chief of Joint Staff. Qi was one of the military commanders of the relief efforts after the 2008 Sichuan earthquake.

Qi attained the rank of major general in March 2002, lieutenant general in July 2010, and full general in July 2014. He is serving as deputy chief Joint Staff, since 2014. He is a full member of the 18th Central Committee of the Chinese Communist Party (2012−2017).

Military offices
Preceded by Xu Chengyun	Commander of the 12th Group Army; 2002–2005	Succeeded by Wang Jiaocheng
Preceded by Zhang Qinsheng	Head of the Operations Department of the General Staff of the People's Liberation Army; 2005–2009	Succeeded by Bai Jianjun
Preceded by Sun Jianguo	Assistant to the Chief of General Staff of the People's Liberation Army; 2008–2012	Succeeded by Yi Xiaoguang
Preceded by Wei Fenghe	Deputy Chief of General Staff of the People's Liberation Army; 2012–2016	Succeeded by Position revoked
New title	Deputy Chief of the Joint Staff Department of the Central Military Commission; 2016–2017	Succeeded by Ma Yiming
