= Sun Ganqing =

Chinese general

- 孙干卿

Chief of Staff of the Kunming Military Region
- In office 23 December 1977 – 29 July 1980
- Preceded by: Zhu Ying
- Succeeded by: Li Wenqing

Chief of Staff of the Guangzhou Military Region
- In office November 1969 – December 1977
- Preceded by: Yan Zhongchuan
- Succeeded by: Zhou Deli

Commander of the Hainan Military District
- In office July 1963 – November 1969
- Preceded by: Wu Chunren
- Succeeded by: Jiang Xueshan

Personal details
- Born: January 19, 1919 Linzi County, Shandong, China
- Died: January 5, 2019 (aged 99) Nanjing, Jiangsu, China
- Party: Chinese Communist Party

Military service
- Allegiance: People's Republic of China
- Branch/service: People's Liberation Army Ground Force
- Years of service: 1938–1984
- Rank: Major general
- Commands: Hainan Military District; Guangzhou Military Region; Kunming Military District
- Battles/wars: Second Sino-Japanese War; Chinese Civil War; Sino-Vietnamese War
- Awards: Second Class Medal, Order of Independence and Freedom; Second Class Medal, Order of Liberation

Chinese name
- Traditional Chinese: 孫幹卿
- Simplified Chinese: 孙干卿
Transcriptions
Standard Mandarin
- Hanyu Pinyin: Sūn Gànqīng

Sun Ganqing (Chinese: 孙干卿; 19 January 1919 – 5 January 2019) was a major general of the Chinese People's Liberation Army. He served as chief of staff of the Guangzhou Military Region and the Kunming Military Region, and commander of the Hainan Military District. He was a veteran of the Second Sino-Japanese War, Chinese Civil War, and Sino-Vietnamese War.

== Biography ==
Sun was born in Linzi, Shandong, on 19 January 1919. He enlisted in the Eighth Route Army at the beginning of 1938. He joined the Chinese Communist Party at the same year. During the Second Sino-Japanese War, he fought with the Imperial Japanese Army in north China's Shandong province. After war, he was assigned to northeast China, where he successively served as regimental commander of the Northeast Field Corps and division chief of staff of the Fourth Field Army. During the Chinese Civil War, he participated in the Battle of Linjiang, Liaoshen Campaign, Pingjin Campaign, and the Battle of Hainan Island.

After the founding of the Communist State in 1958, he became deputy commander of the Artillery Division of Guangzhou Military Region. He attained the rank of major general (shao jiang) in 1961. In July 1963 he was appointed commander of the Hainan Military District. In 1977 he was appointed chief of staff of the Kunming Military Region. He retired in September 1984.

Sun died of illness in Nanjing, Jiangsu, on 5 January 2019, at age 99.

== Awards ==
- Second Class Medal, Order of Independence and Freedom
- Second Class Medal, Order of Liberation

Military offices
Preceded by Wu Chunren (吴纯仁)	Commander of the Hainan Military District; 1963–1969	Succeeded by Jiang Xueshan (江雪山)
Preceded by Yan Zhongchuan (阎仲川)	Chief of staff of the Guangzhou Military Region; 1969–1977	Succeeded by Zhou Deli (周德礼)
Preceded by Zhu Ying (朱英)	Chief of staff of the Kunming Military Region; 1977–1980	Succeeded by Li Wenqing (李文清)
