= Guangxi Normal University =

University in Guilin, Guangxi, southern China

- 广西师范大学 (Chinese); Gvangjsih Swhfan Dayoz (Zhuang)
- Former name: Guangxi Normal Specialized Post-Secondary College
- Motto: 尊师重道 敬业乐群
- Type: Public
- Established: 1932; 94 years ago
- Budget: ¥2.26 billion (2026)
- President: He Zubin (贺祖斌)
- Party Secretary: Deng Jun (邓军)
- Academic staff: 1,535
- Administrative staff: 2,180
- Undergraduates: 26,831
- Postgraduates: 6,386
- Doctoral students: 171
- Other students: 16,000 correspondence and visiting students
- Location: Guilin, Guangxi, China; 25°16′56″N 110°18′01″E
- Campus: Three urban campuses in Guilin, Guangxi
- Colors: GXNU Violet; White
- Website: www.gxnu.edu.cn

Guangxi Normal University (simplified Chinese: 广西师范大学; traditional Chinese: 廣西師範大學; pinyin: Guǎngxī shīfàn dàxué, abbreviated GXNU) is a provincial research university located in Guilin, Guangxi, China with historical strengths in arts and sciences, teacher education and international exchange programs. Its campus houses the Jingjiang Princes' Palace constructed in 1372 during the Ming Dynasty. Established in 1932 as one of the earliest normal schools (teacher training institutions) in China, GXNU has evolved into a comprehensive university granting undergraduate, graduate, and doctoral degrees across 21 colleges and departments with 75 undergraduate majors.

The GXNU chemistry department is ranked in the Global Top 1% according to the Thomson Reuters 2017 InCites Essential Science Indicators (ESI), based on citation frequency of published research papers.

== History ==
=== Establishment and merging into Guangxi University ===
Guangxi Normal University was established in 1932 as Guangxi Provincial Teacher's College, the first normal school in the Guangxi region and one of the first teacher training institutions in the country. Its first president was notable educator Yang Dongyu (杨东莼; 楊東蒓). The original campus was located in the Yanshan District of Guilin, where the modern university now maintains a branch campus.

Almost immediately from its establishment, the fledgling institution became the center of a power struggle between the provincial Guangxi government and the Nationalist Ministry of Education, resulting in a long period of evolution, absorption into other institutions, renaming, and re-establishment. In 1936, the provincial government ordered the school to merge into National Guangxi University (now known as Guangxi University, the flagship public university of Guanxi autonomous region). The school became the National Guangxi University College of Liberal Arts, which focused on the humanities and no longer functioned solely as a normal school.

=== Relocation and evolution into an independent institution ===
In 1941, a greater demand for schoolteachers in Guangxi caused the college to be separated from Guangxi University and reconstituted as the independent Guangxi Teacher's College. The school was renamed the Guangxi Guilin Teacher's College in 1942, and then National Guilin Teacher's College in 1943. In February 1946, the school moved to the city of Nanning and became the National Nanning Teacher's College.

In February 1950, the school moved back to Guilin and merged with National Guangxi University for the second time. This time, the school became the National Guangxi University Teacher's College, also known as the College of Culture and Education, retaining its function as a normal school.

In 1953, the People's Republic of China began a nationwide reorganization of higher education institutions. In July 1953, the Ministry of Education ordered the re-establishment of the normal school as an independent institution to be known as Guangxi Teacher's College. To support the creation of the new school, Guangxi University transferred 53 professors in its departments of Chinese, foreign languages, history, mathematics, physics, and chemistry, as well as 256 faculty members of the College of Culture and Education (many of them faculty of the original Guangxi Provincial Teacher's College), to the Guangxi Teacher's College.

Once again independent, the school was granted the historic Jingjiang Princes' Palace in Guilin, Guangxi as its new Wangcheng Campus.

Until 1978, it was the only institution of higher education in Guangxi authorized to grant a bachelor's degree in teacher education. In 1981, the Guangxi Teacher's College received authorization to grant master's degrees.

On May 29, 1983, the institution incorporated as the Guangxi Normal University. It granted its first doctoral degrees in 2006.

Timeline of the evolution of Guangxi Normal University
Date	Event
1932	The Guangxi Provincial Teacher's College is established at Yanshan District, Guilin, Guangxi.
1936	Guangxi provincial authorities order the college to merge with National Guangxi University. It becomes the National Guangxi University College of Liberal Arts.
1941	The College of Liberal Arts is separated from National Guangxi University. It becomes the independent Guangxi Teacher's College.
1942	Guangxi Teacher's College is renamed the Guangxi Guilin Teacher's College.
1943	Guangxi Guilin Teacher's College is renamed the National Guilin Teacher's College.
1946	The institution moves to Nanning, Guangxi. It is renamed the National Nanning Teacher's College.
1950	The institution moves back to Guilin, Guangxi. It is reincorporated into National Guangxi University as the College of Culture and Education.
1953	The Ministry of Education creates Guangxi Teacher's College with over 300 faculty from Guangxi University, including the College of Culture and Education.
1983	Guangxi Teacher's College incorporates as a university and is renamed Guangxi Normal University, taking on its modern name and identity.

== Academics and research ==
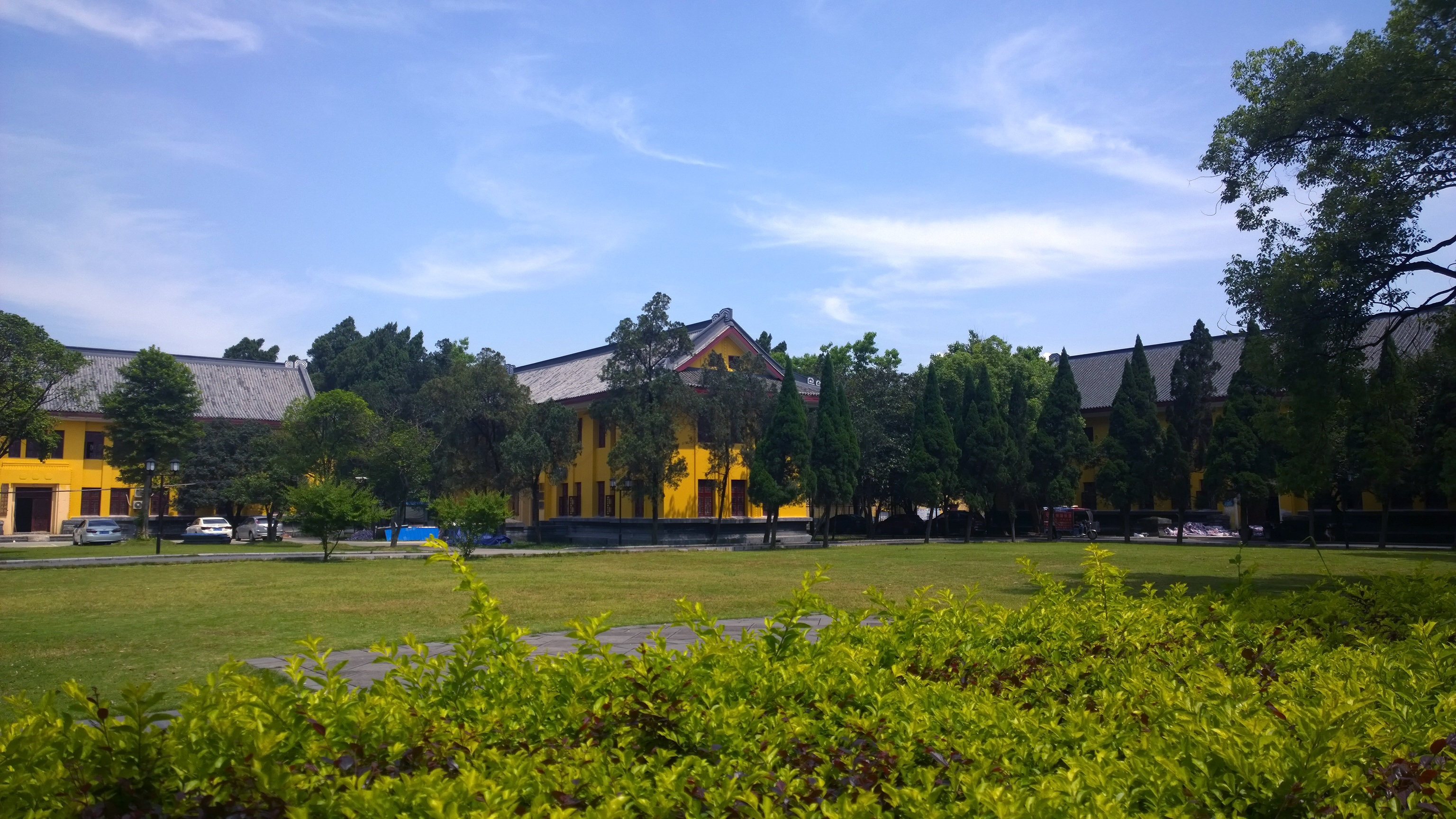
GXNU students take classes and live on the Wangcheng Campus, on the grounds of the Jingjiang Princes' Palace, a historic royal complex and the only college campus to be awarded a 5A rating by the China National Tourism Administration

As of 2018, the university had 26,831 undergraduate students, 6,386 graduate students, and 171 PhD candidates, including over 1,600 international students across all degree programs. Additionally, 16,000 correspondence, online, and visiting students are enrolled in GXNU programs.

Guangxi Normal University runs massive online open courses through various colleges and departments, including a MOOC focused on the life and works of Tang Dynasty poets from the historical Guangxi region.

=== List of GXNU colleges and departments ===
Guangxi Normal University Colleges and Departments
College of Chinese Language and Literature	College of Journalism and Communication
College of History, Culture, and Tourism	College of Marxism
College of Law, Politics, and Public Administration	College of Economics and Management
College of Education	College of Foreign Studies
GXNU Academy of Fine Arts	College of Music
College of Design	College of Physical Education
College of Mathematics and Statistics	College of Physical Science and Technology
College of Chemistry and Pharmacy	College of Life Science
College of the Environment and Resources	College of Computer Science and Information Technology
College of Electrical Engineering	College of Vocational Education
College of International Culture and Education	College of Health Management

Guangxi Normal University has 22 academic disciplines recognized as Guangxi Key Disciplines, indicating a high quality program compared to programs at other universities in Guangxi. The university hosts 11 Experimental Teaching Demonstration Centers.

=== Research ===
From 2011 to 2015, Guangxi Normal University was awarded 317 national-level research projects. Overall, the university funded 2,122 research projects for a total of 403 million yuan in research expenditure. Faculty members published 3,919 journal articles.

Guangxi Normal University was awarded 139 provincial and municipal research awards, including the Guangxi Natural Science Award, Guangxi Science and Technology Progress Award, and Guangxi Social Science Award.

The university hosts the State Key Laboratory of Joint Construction, which was jointly established with the Chinese Ministry of Education.

=== Academic journals and conferences ===
Guangxi Normal University publishes the Journal of Guangxi Normal University (Natural Sciences Edition), which has been compiled into the national Chinese Core Journals Overview, as well as the Journal of Guangxi Normal University (Philosophy and Social Sciences Edition).

From 2011 to 2015, GXNU hosted 9 international and national conferences on topics ranging from inorganic chemistry to wildlife ecology and resource conservation.

=== Libraries and total collection volume ===
Guangxi Normal University contains three main libraries on the Wangcheng, Yucai, and Yanshan campuses, including the library at Yanshan Campus which is the largest library in Guangxi autonomous region. As of 2016, the total number of physical books in the GXNU libraries surpassed 3,260,000. The libraries also maintain access to 2,226,653 electronic books and resources across 82 databases.

== International collaboration ==
Guangxi Normal University is known for extensive international collaboration through exchange programs and research collaboration agreements. The university is the only institution in Guangxi autonomous region designated by the Chinese Ministry of Education as an official "demonstration base" for experimental international student programs; as such, educating international students is an integral part of the GXNU mission. Undergraduate, graduate, doctoral, and Chinese language programs sponsor over 1,600 international students on the GXNU campus.

GXNU is one of a group of Chinese universities which host international students awarded a Chinese Government Scholarship by the Chinese Ministry of Education or a Confucius Institute Scholarship awarded by the Hanban government agency. It also receives students awarded the ASEAN Scholarship by the Guangxi provincial government.

The university has established cooperative programs with over 200 institutions in 40 countries such as Malaysia's Universiti Tunku Abdul Rahman. In particular, GXNU is the host institution for three Confucius Institutes, located at Prince of Songkla University in Thailand, State University of Malang in Indonesia, and Hanoi University in neighboring Vietnam.

== Student life ==
In recognition of its considerable international population, the university annually celebrates foreign holidays including Christmas, Halloween, and Songkran, as well as hosting its own International Cultural Festival and Foreign Language Karaoke Contest.

Other events include the Indonesia Culture Day in May, the International Student-Parent Conference in June, and the Vietnamese Culture Day and Teacher's Day on November 20 of each year.

=== International Cultural Festival ===
In mid-April, GXNU celebrates the International Cultural Festival, which features parades, student games, food exhibitions and cultural shows focused on Thai, Lao, Cambodian, and Burmese culture. While the festival is focused on the international student communities, all students are welcome to attend the events.

== Campuses ==
Guangxi Normal University consists of three urban campuses in Guilin, Guangxi, China. The campuses are connected by private shuttle buses arranged by GXNU, as well as the local #98 public bus route.

=== Wangcheng Campus ===
The Wangcheng Campus (王城校区) is the main campus of Guangxi Normal University. It is located on the grounds of the Jingjiang Princes' Palace (colloquially known as Wangcheng), a historical royal complex dating to the Ming dynasty (circa 1372–1392). Originally a walled palace complex built as a home for Zhu Shouqian, the Prince of Jingjiang, it has housed 14 kings from 12 generations through the Ming and Qing dynasties, as well as Sun Yat-sen who stayed in one of the mansions in 1921.

The only college campus with a 5A rating from the China National Tourism Administration, the Wangcheng Campus features the old Chengyun gate leading to the Prince's Mansion, the ancient Guoxue Hall which houses the university's School of Chinese Civilization, and Solitary Beauty Peak, the tallest mountain formation in Guilin, with panoramic views of the city and surrounding countryside. The complex is surrounded by the best-preserved Ming-era city wall in China.

=== Yucai Campus ===
The Yucai Campus (育才校区), located in east Guilin next to Seven Star Park, features open park spaces interspersed with academic halls and dormitories. Established in 1976, structures include the Shaw Building, a teacher training facility built with funds donated to Guangxi Normal University by Run Run Shaw, a Hong Kong entertainment mogul and philanthropist, and the Yucai Campus Library, which is among the oldest and most extensive libraries in Guangxi. There is an apartment complex for international students and a monument honoring the friendship of Chinese and Vietnamese students.

=== Yanshan Campus ===
Opened in 2007, the Yanshan Campus (雁山校区) includes the GXNU athletic facilities and the Yanshan Campus Library, which is the largest library in Guanxi autonomous region. The campus also includes Confucius Square, where the university hosts annual commemorations of Confucius' birthday, celebrations of ancient Chinese civilization, Chinese New Years' celebrations, and ethnic food festivals. The Yanshan Campus cafeteria specializes in ethnic Zhuang and local foods.

== Notable alumni ==
- Wang Yungui (born 1992), entrepreneur and businesswoman
- Liu Dingxin (1913–1997), major general in the People's Liberation Army
- Mo Hua (born 1964), former Party Secretary of Yulin
- Peng Xiaochun (born 1961), former vice chairman of Guangxi CPPCC

== Gallery ==
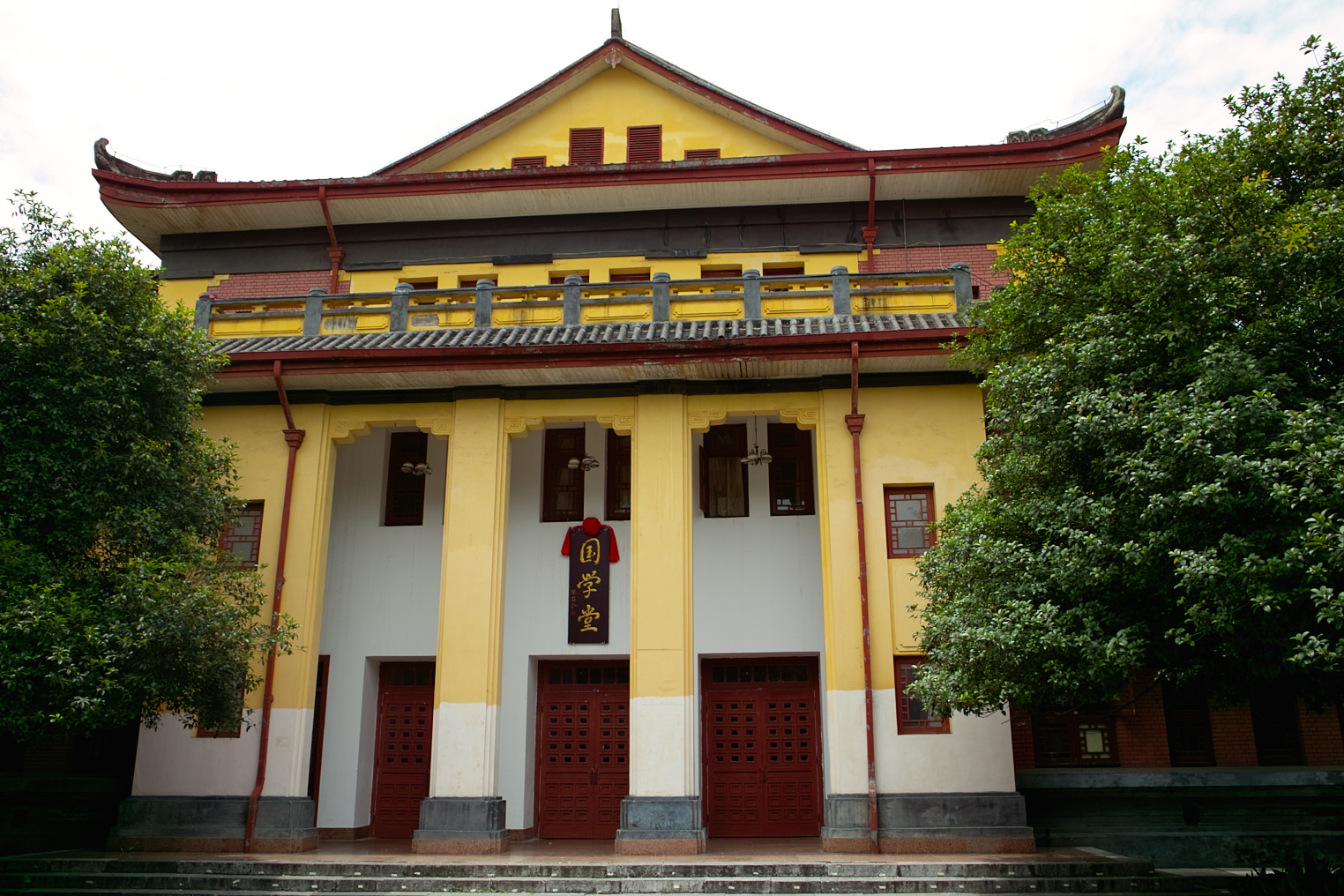
Guoxue Hall at Guangxi Normal University, an antique building on the Wangcheng Campus, home to the School of Chinese Civilization

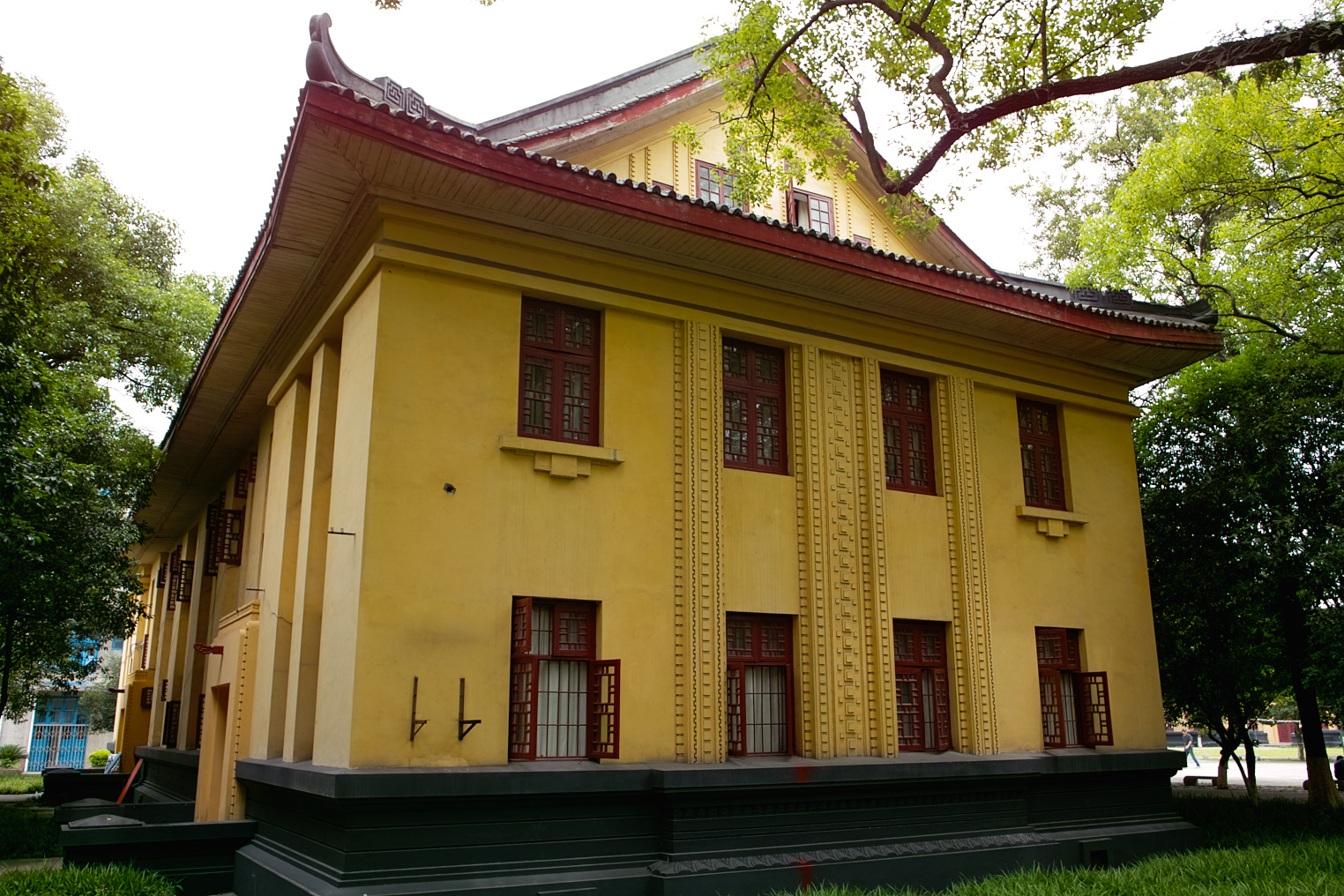
The University House building at Guangxi Normal University

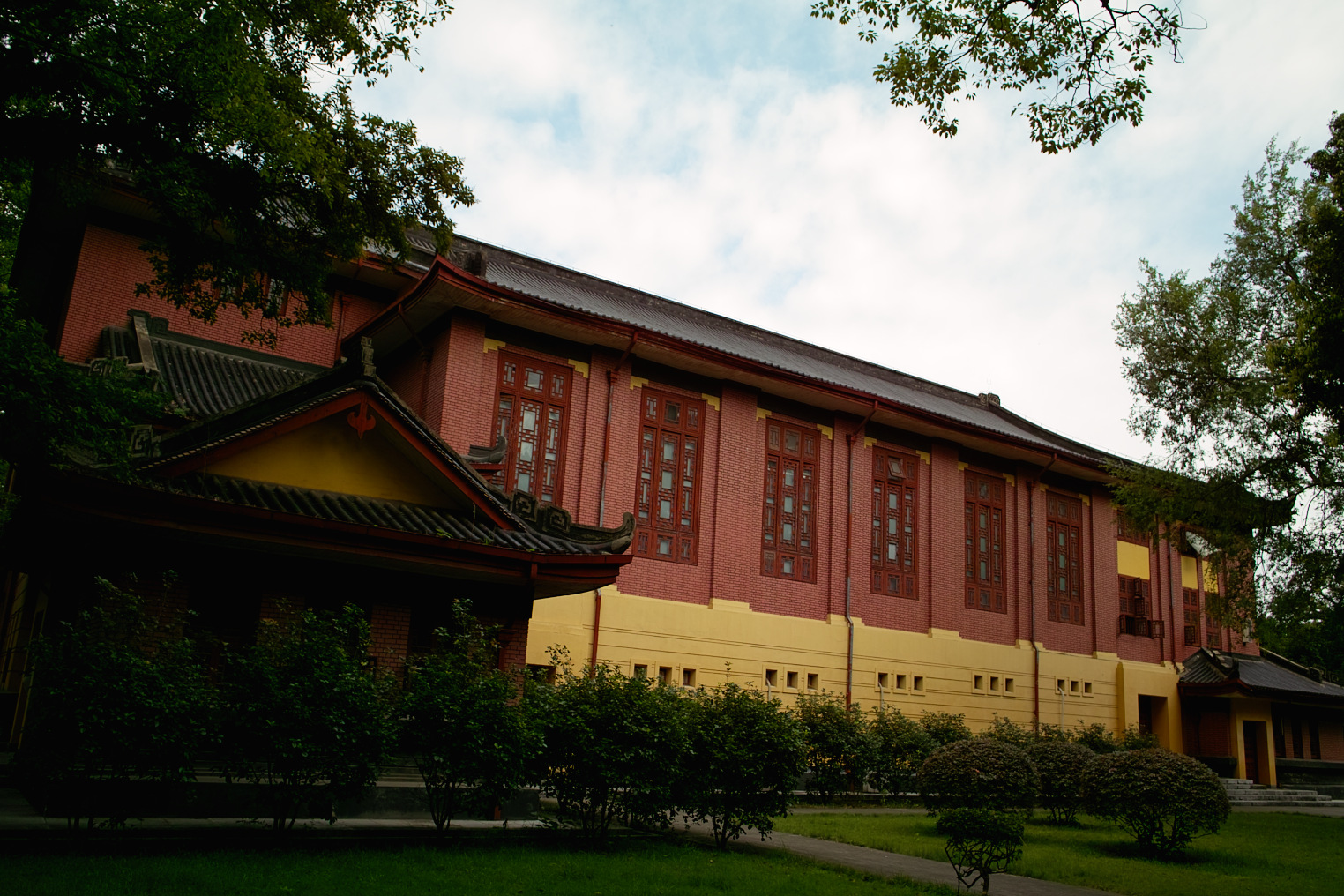
Academic building at Guangxi Normal University

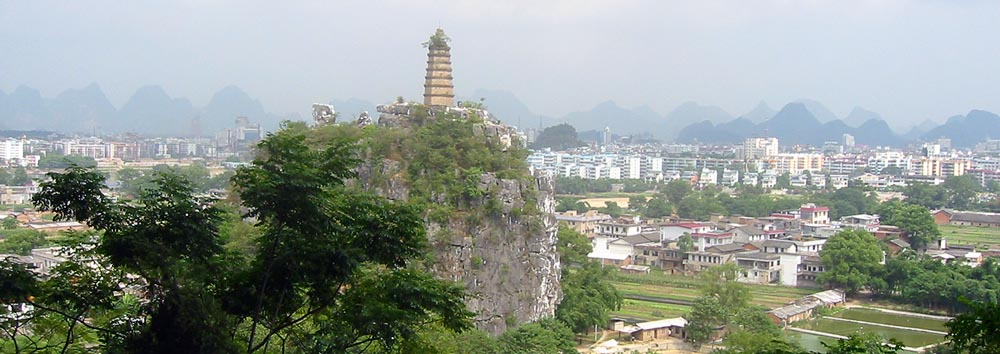
Aerial view of Guilin, Guangxi, China

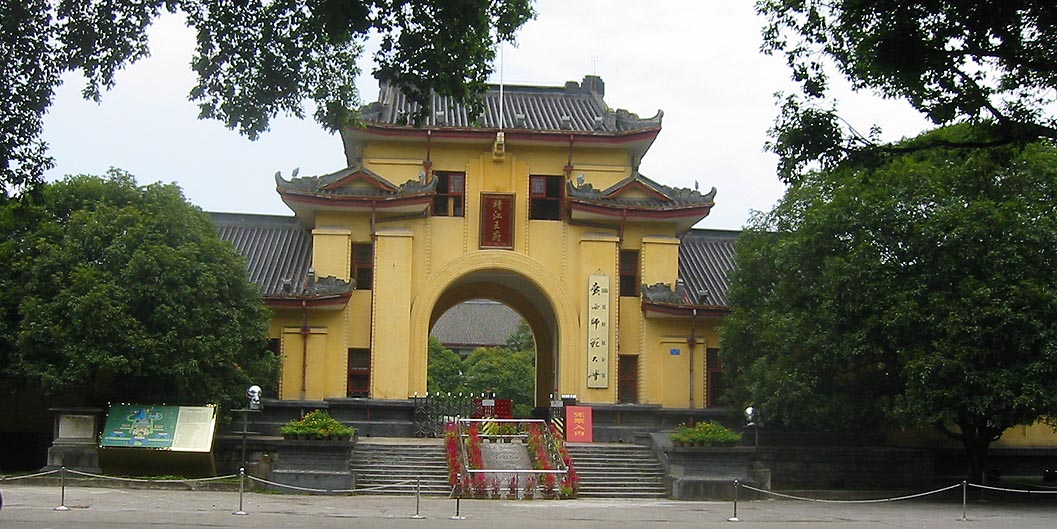
Guangxi Normal University

== See also ==
- Jingjiang Princes' Palace, the historical palace complex which hosts the Guangxi Normal University Wangcheng Campus
