= PLA Hong Kong Garrison Honour Guard Battalion =

Military unit

The PLA Hong Kong Garrison Honour Guard Battalion (Chinese: 中國人民解放軍駐香港部隊儀仗隊) is the ceremonial unit for the People's Liberation Army Hong Kong Garrison based in the Hong Kong Special Administrative Region (HKSAR). It consists of 210 soldiers from the People's Liberation Army Ground Force, Air Force and Navy who are based at Stonecutters Island. It provided public duties for all events of a ceremonial nature on behalf of the PLA during events of regional importance in the HKSAR. It was formed in 1994 as a result of the impending transfer of sovereignty over Hong Kong. At the time of its founding, it was composed of some members of the PLA Honour Guard in Beijing. It began to recruit female soldiers in February 2016. Unlike the unit in the capital, the Hong Kong unit is not a purely ceremonial unit as it is also capable of becoming active duty infantry when needed. A requirement for membership in the unit is being at least 182 cm (6 ft 0 in). It is attached directly to the PLAHK Garrison through the Infantry Garrison Brigade.

Its holiday activities cover:

- Labour Day (1 May)
- Hong Kong Special Administrative Region Establishment Day (1 July)
- PLA Day (1 August)
- Victory of War of Resistance against Japan Day (2 September)
- National Day of the People's Republic of China (1 October)

It provides the guard of honour for all open days conducted by the PLAHK Garrison, taking part in every military parade in Hong Kong since the PLA Day Parade 2004, and was most recently featured at the 2017 Establishment Day parade at Shek Kong Airfield. On 23 September 2019, ahead of the 70th anniversary of the People's Republic of China, the color guard raised the national flag at Pui Kiu Middle School during a morning assembly. It also has taken part in military tattoos such as the International Military Tattoo in Hong Kong. In February 2021, ten soldiers from the battalion began training members of the Hong Kong Police Force in Chinese-style goose stepping in preparation for the handover parade on 1 July 2022 in honor of the 25th anniversary celebrations of the handover of Hong Kong.

Like most PLA ceremonial units, its uniform for public functions is the Type 07 uniform. The color guard utilizes the QBZ-95-1 while on parade while the rest of the unit uses the Type 56 Ceremonial Rifle.
