= Chen Daoxiang =

Chinese general

- 陈道祥
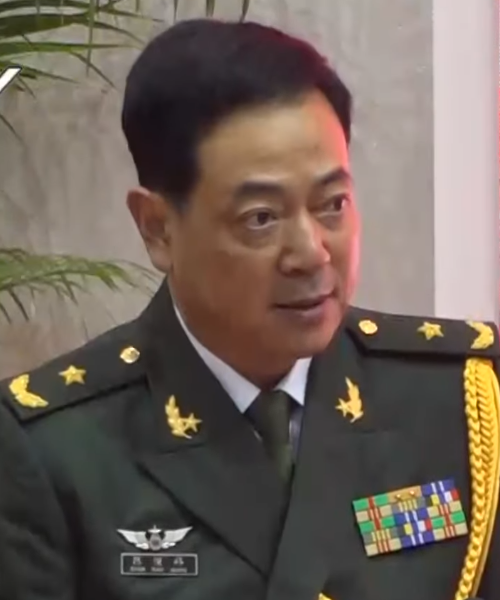
- Chen in 2019

Commander of the PLA Hong Kong Garrison
- In office March 2019 – January 2022
- Preceded by: Tan Benhong
- Succeeded by: Peng Jingtang

Personal details
- Born: September 1962 (age 63) Xuancheng, Anhui, China
- Party: Chinese Communist Party

Military service
- Allegiance: People's Republic of China
- Branch/service: People's Liberation Army Ground Force
- Rank: Major general
- Commands: Guangzhou Military Region/ Southern Theater Command (2014–2019)

Chinese name
- Simplified Chinese: 陈道祥
- Traditional Chinese: 陳道祥
Transcriptions
Standard Mandarin
- Hanyu Pinyin: Chén Dàoxiáng

Chen Daoxiang (Chinese: 陈道祥; born September 1962) is a major general (shaojiang) of the People's Liberation Army (PLA) who served as commander of the PLA Hong Kong Garrison between 2019 and 2022. He is a delegate to the 13th National People's Congress.

== Biography ==
Chen was born in Xuancheng, Anhui, in September 1962. He served in the Nanjing Military Region for a long time. In April 2010, he was promoted to chief of staff of the 1st Group Army. In July 2011, he was awarded the military rank of general (shangjiang) by chairman Xi Jinping. In July 2014, he was promoted to become deputy chief of staff of Guangzhou Military Region, a position he held until April 2019, when he was transferred to Hong Kong and appointed commander of the PLA Hong Kong Garrison.

Military offices
Preceded by Tan Benhong	Commander of the PLA Hong Kong Garrison; 2019–2022	Succeeded by Peng Jingtang
