= Sun Jianguo =

Chinese admiral

- 孙建国
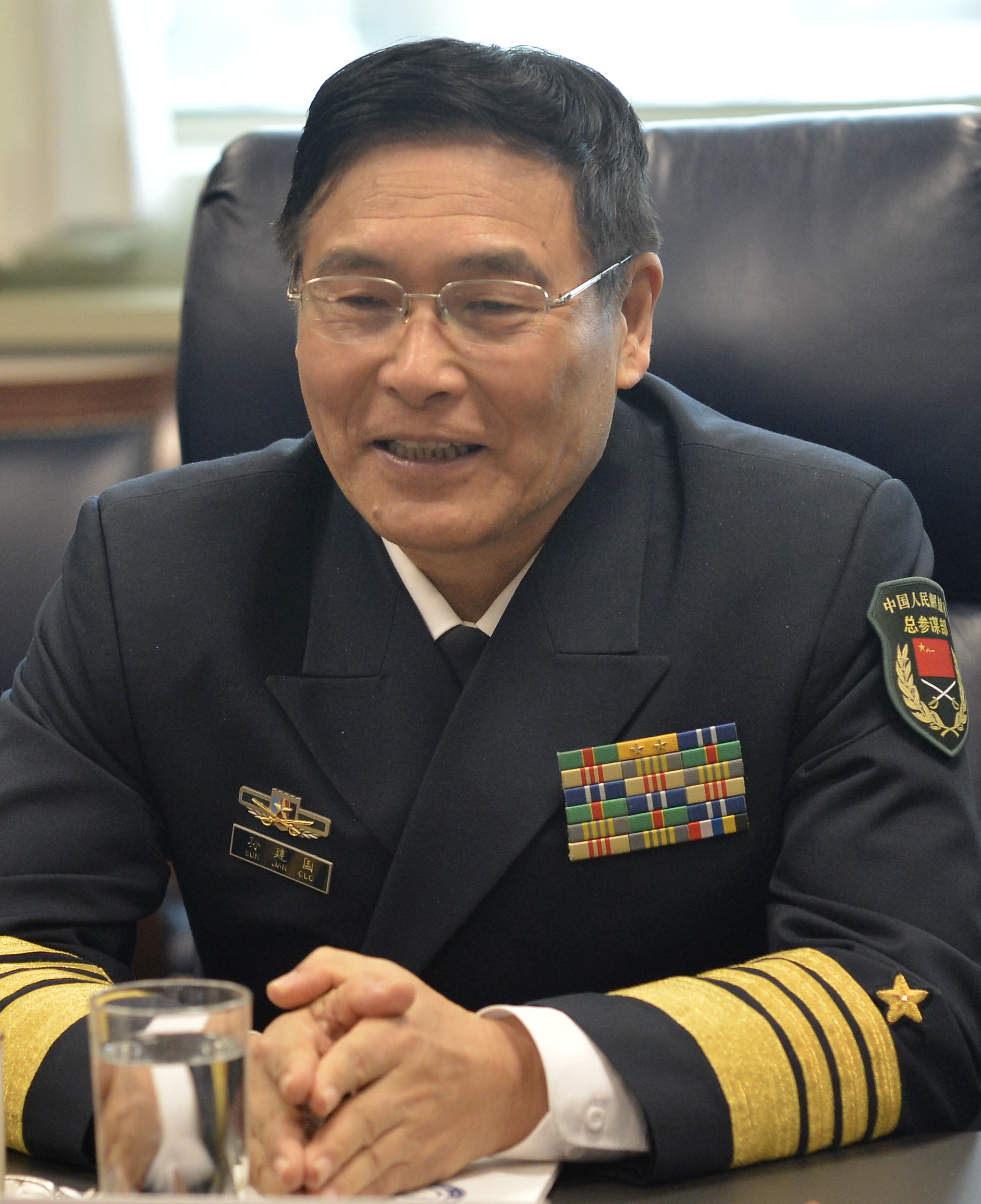
- Sun Jianguo at The Pentagon in November 2014

Chief of Staff of the People's Liberation Army Navy
- In office December 2004 – July 2006
- Preceded by: Zhao Xingfa
- Succeeded by: Ding Yiping

Personal details
- Born: 1952 (age 73–74) Wuqiao, Hebei, China
- Party: Chinese Communist Party
- Education: PLA Navy Submarine Academy

Military service
- Allegiance: People's Republic of China
- Branch/service: People's Liberation Army Navy
- Years of service: 1968−present
- Rank: Admiral

Chinese name
- Simplified Chinese: 孙建国
- Traditional Chinese: 孫建國
Transcriptions
Standard Mandarin
- Hanyu Pinyin: Sūn Jiànguó

Sun Jianguo (Chinese: 孙建国; born 1952) is a retired admiral of the Chinese People's Liberation Army Navy (PLAN). He served as Deputy Chief of the Joint Staff from 2009 to 2017.

== Biography ==
Sun Jianguo was born in 1952 in Wuqiao, Hebei. He joined the People's Liberation Army (PLA) in 1968, and graduated from the PLA Navy Submarine Academy in 1978. From 1996 to 2000 he served as deputy commander of the Navy submarine base and President of the Submarine Academy. He was appointed Deputy Chief of Staff of the PLA Navy in 2000, and promoted to Chief of Staff in 2004. In 2006 he became Assistant to the PLA Chief of Staff, and was promoted to Deputy PLA Chief of Staff in 2009. In 2013, Sun replaced Qi Jianguo as chairman of the China Institute for International Strategic Studies, a military intelligence and diplomacy think tank. He kept the position at CIISS until 2018, when he was succeeded by Chen Guangjun.

He attained the rank of rear admiral in 1999, vice-admiral in July 2006, and admiral in July 2011.

Sun was an alternate member of the 17th Central Committee of the Chinese Communist Party and a full member of the 18th Central Committee.

Military offices
Preceded by Zhao Xingfa	Chief of Staff of the People's Liberation Army Navy; 2004–2006	Succeeded by Ding Yiping
