= Wang Yungui =

Chinese businesswoman (born 1992)

- 汪云贵
- Born: 1992 (age 33–34); Jinxiu, Guangxi, China
- Education: Guangxi Normal University
- Occupation: Businesswoman
- Years active: 2014–present

Wang Yungui (Chinese: 汪云贵; born 1992) is a Chinese businesswoman. A member of the Yao ethnic minority, she runs an e-commerce business where she promotes local specialty foods while wearing a traditional Yao costume. To help combat poverty in her home village of Liuduan, Wang has worked with local authorities to promote tourism, for which she has won several awards.

== Biography ==
Born in 1992, Wang is a member of the Yao ethnic minority. She graduated from Guangxi Normal University in 2013 with a degree in e-commerce and subsequently worked at Nanjing Lukou International Airport. In 2014, she returned to her home village of Liuduan and established her business there. Her business model included using social media to share streamed content about local food specialties, with either Wang or her sister appearing in traditional Yao costume.

As an entrepreneur, Wang established a food brand – Liuduan Yao Village – which promotes the culture and foodways of its eponymous village, as well as the surrounding Dayao Mountains of Guangxi. Her company buys traditionally made food and other goods from local people. Working with her sister Yunyu, they sell regional tea, bamboo shoots and processed meats. Initially, locals did not trust Wang and she found it difficult to find suppliers, prompting her to inquire by knocking from door-to-door. By 2016, Wang had been able to lift her family out of poverty; this inspired her to attempt to do the same for her village. That year, she established a tea processing plant, based on her mother's tea preparation techniques. In 2018, the sisters began working with the local government in Liuduan to develop tourism, promoting local folk festivals as tourist events and boosting the local economy. Local authorities credited her initiatives with helping to lift 151 households and 578 people in Liuduan out of poverty. In 2019, Wang established a bottled water factory, which by 2021 had an annual turnover of 8 million yuan. This diversification was inspired by a complaint from a buyer that the specialty tea they purchased tasted different outside the region. The water is branded as Yaomai Mountain Spring. The same year she promoted local tea terraces as locations for traditional marriage ceremonies, which further advanced the local economy.

== Recognition ==
In 2020, Wang was one of 99 people in China to be awarded the National Poverty Alleviation – Endeavor Award. In 2021, she was the recipient of multiple honorary titles: National Advanced Individual in Poverty Alleviation, National Model of Women's Contributions, National Youth Pioneer in Rural Revitalization. In 2022, she was named one of Laibin City's Top Ten Outstanding Youths.
