= Peng Jingtang =

People's Liberation Army major general

- 彭京堂

Deputy Commander of the People's Armed Police
- Incumbent
- Assumed office December 2025
- Preceded by: Fu Wenhua

Commander of the PLA Hong Kong Garrison
- In office 9 January 2022 – December 2025
- Political Commissar: Cai Yongzhong; Lai Ruxin
- Preceded by: Chen Daoxiang
- Succeeded by: TBA

Personal details
- Born: China
- Party: Chinese Communist Party

Military service
- Allegiance: People's Republic of China
- Branch/service: People's Liberation Army Ground Force People's Armed Police
- Years of service: ?-present
- Rank: Armed Police Lieutenant General
- Unit: People's Armed Police PLA Hong Kong Garrison Jinan Military Region

Peng Jingtang (Chinese: 彭京堂; pinyin: Péng Jīngtáng) is a lieutenant general in the People's Armed Police who is the current deputy commander of the People's Armed Police, in office since December 2025.

== Biography ==
Peng served in the Jinan Military Region, chief of staff of the Xinjiang Armed Police Corps, and deputy chief of staff of the People's Armed Police. He was promoted to the rank of major general (shaojiang) on 29 July 2018. On 9 January 2022, he was commissioned as commander of the PLA Hong Kong Garrison, succeeding Chen Daoxiang. In December 2025, he was seen as a lieutenant general (zhongjiang) representing the People's Armed Police.

Military offices
Preceded by Chen Daoxiang	Commander of the PLA Hong Kong Garrison; 2022–2025	Succeeded by TBA
Preceded by Fu Wenhua	Deputy Commander of the People's Armed Police; 2025-present	Incumbent
