= Zhang Shibo =

Retired general of the Chinese People's Liberation Army of China

- 张仕波
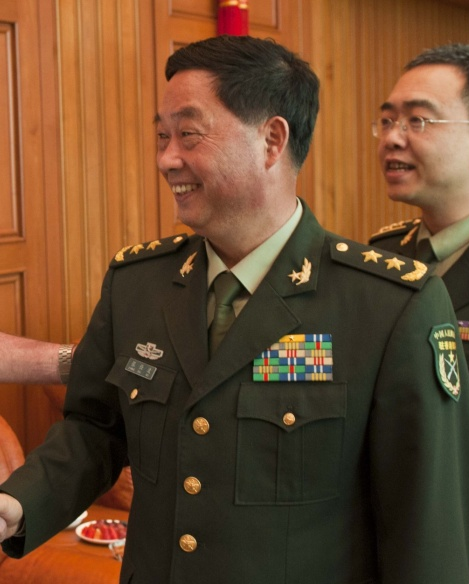
- Lt. Gen. Zhang Shibo in 2012, was the Commander of the Beijing Military Region

President of the PLA National Defence University
- In office December 2014 – January 2017
- Preceded by: Song Puxuan
- Succeeded by: Zheng He

Commander of the Beijing Military Region
- In office October 2012 – December 2014
- Preceded by: Fang Fenghui
- Succeeded by: Song Puxuan

Commander of the PLA Hong Kong Garrison
- In office December 2007 – October 2012
- Preceded by: Wang Jitang
- Succeeded by: Wang Xiaojun

Personal details
- Born: February 1952 (age 74) Zhuji, Zhejiang, China
- Party: Chinese Communist Party
- Education: Shandong University

Military service
- Allegiance: People's Republic of China
- Branch/service: People's Liberation Army Ground Force
- Years of service: 1970–2017
- Rank: General

Chinese name
- Simplified Chinese: 张仕波
- Traditional Chinese: 張仕波
Transcriptions
Standard Mandarin
- Hanyu Pinyin: Zhāng Shìbō

Zhang Shibo (Chinese: 张仕波; born February 1952) is a retired general of the Chinese People's Liberation Army of China. He served as commander of the PLA Hong Kong Garrison, commander of the Beijing Military Region, and president of the PLA National Defence University.

== Biography ==
Zhang Shibo was born in February 1952 in Zhuji, Zhejiang Province. He joined the PLA in 1970, serving as an ordinary soldier in the Jinan Military Region. He later rose to deputy commander of the 54th Group Army, deputy chief of staff of the Jinan MR, and commander of the 20th Group Army. He graduated from Shandong University with a degree in Marxist philosophy.

In 2008, he replaced Lieutenant General Wang Jitang as commander of the PLA Hong Kong Garrison. He attained the rank of lieutenant general (zhong jiang) in July 2009.

In October 2012, Zhang Shibo was promoted to commander of the Beijing Military Region. In December 2014, Lieutenant General Song Puxuan replaced him as commander of the Beijing MR, and Zhang took over Song's old position as president of the PLA National Defence University. On 31 July 2015, Zhang Shibo was promoted to general (shang jiang), the highest rank for Chinese military officers in active service.

In 2017, Zhang Shibo authored a book that spoke of the potential for biological warfare to include "specific ethnic genetic attacks."

Zhang was an alternate of the 17th Central Committee of the Chinese Communist Party (2007–12), and a full member of the 18th Central Committee (2012–17).

Military offices
| Preceded by Yuan Jiaxin | Commander of the 20th Group Army; 2003–2007 | Succeeded by Bai Jianjun |
| Preceded by Wang Jitang | Commander of the PLA Hong Kong Garrison; 2007–2012 | Succeeded by Wang Xiaojun |
| Preceded by Fang Fenghui | Commander of the Beijing Military Region; 2012–2014 | Succeeded by Song Puxuan |
| Preceded by Song Puxuan | President of the PLA National Defence University; 2014–2017 | Succeeded by Zheng He |
