= Hong Kong Garrison =

Garrison of the People's Liberation Army

People's Liberation Army Hong Kong Garrison
- 中国人民解放军驻香港部队
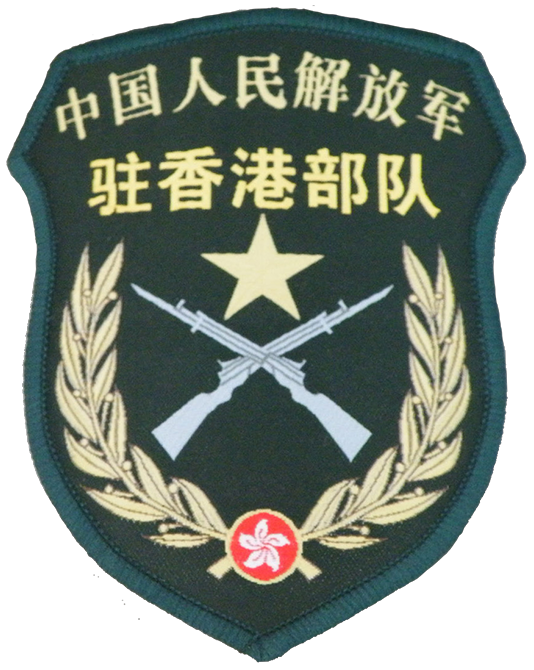
- Sleeve insignia of PLA Ground Force units of the Hong Kong Garrison
- Founded: 1 July 1997; 29 years ago
- Country: China; Hong Kong
- Allegiance: Chinese Communist Party
- Branch: PLA Ground Force; PLA Navy; PLA Air Force
- Size: 10,000 to 12,000
- Part of: Southern Theater Command
- Garrison/HQ: Chinese People's Liberation Army Forces Hong Kong Building; 22.2817325°N 114.1641229°E

Commanders
- Commander: Major General Peng Jingtang
- Political Commissar: Major General Lai Ruxin

Chinese People's Liberation Army Hong Kong Garrison
- Traditional Chinese: 中國人民解放軍駐香港部隊
- Simplified Chinese: 中国人民解放军驻香港部队
- Literal meaning: China People Liberation Army stationing Hong Kong Troops
Transcriptions
Standard Mandarin
- Hanyu Pinyin: Zhōngguó Rénmín Jiěfàngjūn Zhù Xiānggǎng Bùduì
Yue: Cantonese
- Jyutping: zung^{1}gwok^{3} jan^{4}man^{4} gaai^{2}fong^{3}gwan^{1} zyu^{3} hoeng^{1}gong^{2} bou^{6}deoi^{2}

The People's Liberation Army Hong Kong Garrison is a garrison of the People's Liberation Army (PLA), responsible for defence duties in the Hong Kong Special Administrative Region (SAR).

Prior to the handover in 1997, the territory was under British rule, and the defence of the territory was the responsibility of the British Forces Overseas Hong Kong, with auxiliary help from the Royal Hong Kong Regiment. After the handover of Hong Kong in July 1997, China stationed a PLA garrison to manage the defence affairs of the territory.

The garrison is headquartered in Chinese People's Liberation Army Forces Hong Kong Building in Central, Hong Kong. The size of the Hong Kong garrison is approximately 10,000–12,000 personnel, including members of the People's Armed Police, People's Liberation Army Navy, People's Liberation Army Air Force, and People's Liberation Army Ground Force.

== Role in Hong Kong ==
The People's Republic of China (PRC) assumed sovereignty over Hong Kong on 1 July 1997 and the Central People's Government (CPG) stationed a garrison of the People's Liberation Army (PLA) in Hong Kong to manage the defense affairs of the territory. While the garrison has been considered primarily symbolic of Beijing's governance over Hong Kong, it is nevertheless asserted to be a combat-ready force.

The Hong Kong Basic Law upon the territory provides that the CPG shall be responsible for the defense of Hong Kong and shall bear the expenditure for the garrison, whereas the colonial Hong Kong Government before 1997 had to pay for the military. The Garrison Law, subsequently enacted by the National People's Congress, contains specific provisions on the duties and rules of discipline of the garrison personnel, jurisdiction and other questions, to facilitate the Hong Kong Garrison in fulfilling its defence functions along legal lines. Military forces stationed in Hong Kong shall not interfere in the local affairs and the Hong Kong government shall be responsible for the maintenance of public order. The Garrison formally stationed in Hong Kong assumed defence responsibility for Hong Kong from midnight onwards on 1 July 1997.

The Hong Kong Garrison includes elements of the People's Liberation Army Ground Force, PLA Navy, and PLA Air Force; these forces are under the direct leadership of the Central Military Commission in Beijing and under the administrative control of the adjacent Southern Theater Command.

While performing its defense duties, the Hong Kong Garrison must abide by both national and Hong Kong laws, as well as the current rules and regulations of the PLA, according to the Garrison Law, a PRC law. After its entry into Hong Kong, the Hong Kong Garrison abide by the Basic Law and the Garrison Law, actively organizing military training. According to the Garrison Law, the Garrison established working contacts with the Hong Kong Government, and opened the barracks on Stonecutters Island and Stanley to the public to promote Hong Kong people's understanding of and trust in the garrison forces and their personnel. Annual open house events are held to showcase the assets and combat readiness of the garrison personnel. Garrison troop rotations are also routine.

== Insignia ==
Personnel in the Hong Kong Garrison wore uniforms different from their mainland counterparts until a new set of uniforms were introduced in 2007. Motor vehicles in the military are right-hand drive, like civilian vehicles in Hong Kong, and carry number plates that start with ZG, standing for zhùgǎng (驻港/駐港), Chinese for "[stationed] in Hong Kong."

== Command ==
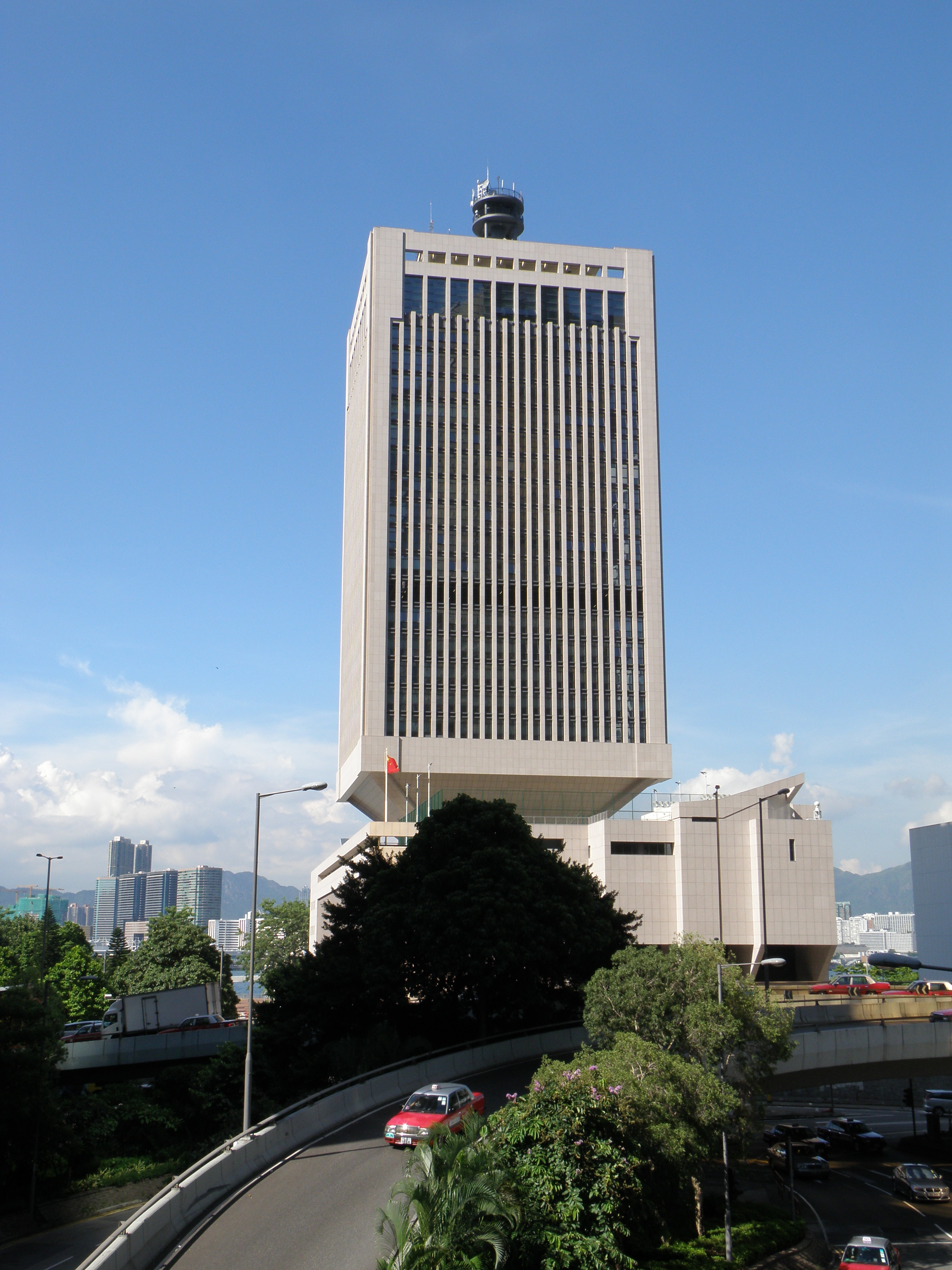
People's Liberation Army Hong Kong Garrison headquarters

The Hong Kong Garrison reports to both the Southern Theater Command and Central Military Commission in Beijing, and informs Hong Kong Government of any actions within or around Hong Kong.

Garrison Commanders

- Lt. General Liu Zhenwu 1997–1999 (appointed 1994)
- Lt. General Xiong Ziren 1999–2003
- Lt. General Wang Jitang 2003–2007
- Lt. General Zhang Shibo 2007–2012
- Lt. General Wang Xiaojun 2012–2014
- Lt. General Tan Benhong 2014–2019
- Maj. General Chen Daoxiang 2019–2022
- Maj. General Peng Jingtang 2022–present

Political Commissars

- Maj. General Xiong Ziren 1997–1999
- Maj. General Wang Yufa 1999–2003
- Maj. General Liu Liangkai 2003–2005
- Lt. General Zhang Rucheng 2005–2007
- Lt. General Liu Liangkai 2007–2010, second term
- Lt. General Wang Zengbo 2010–2012
- Lt. General Yue Shixin 2012–2018
- Maj. General Cai Yongzhong 2018–2022
- Maj. General Lai Ruxin 2022–present

== Properties ==
There are 19 sites occupied by the Garrison across Hong Kong. According to a Reuters investigation, many of these sites are run down and not fully utilised, which has caused some to argue that the land should be returned and used for housing. The Tsing Shan firing range occupies approximately 80% of the 2,750 hectares of land managed by the PLA.

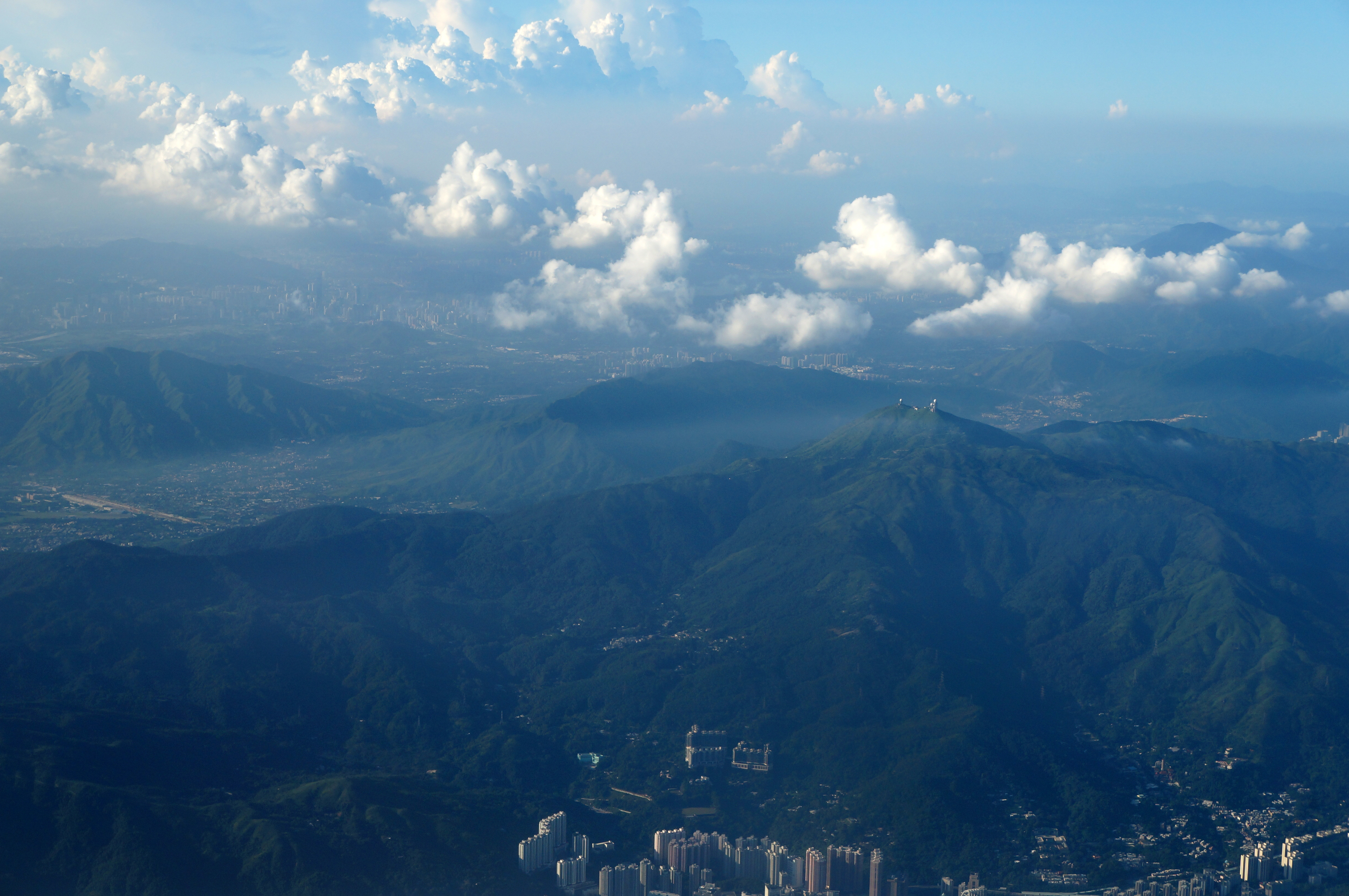
There are three sets of spherical radar equipment on the top of the mountain. From left to right, they belong to the Hong Kong Observatory, the People's Liberation Army, and the Civil Aviation Department.

A secret 20th site is a radar facility in Tai Mo Shan, which was discovered in 2014, without the PLA informing the public, as required by the Garrison Law. It was not publicly recognized by the Hong Kong government until 2021.

The Commander lives on The Peak at Headquarters House, 11 Barker Road. Other property owned by the Garrison includes the United Services Recreation Club.

== Army ==
=== Regiments/units ===
- Infantry Garrison Brigade (Air Assault) (Unit 53300)

Formerly the 1st Red Regiment of 1st Red Division, 1st Red Army. In 1949, the regiment comprised the 424th Regiment, 142nd Division, 48th Army. In 1952, the 142nd Division was assigned to 55th Army and the 424th Regiment renamed the 430th Regiment. In 1970, the 144th Division was renamed as the 163rd Division and 430th Regiment renamed as 487th Regiment.

- PLA Hong Kong Garrison Honour Guard Battalion
- 3 infantry battalions (Air Assault/Heliborne)
- 1 mechanized infantry battalion
- 1 artillery battery
- 1 engineer battalion
- 1 reconnaissance/special ops company (named 5-min Response Unit, some of them later transferred to the Macau Garrison to form the a new Quick Reaction Platoon there)
- 1 intelligence gathering battalion
- 1 Armour Convoy
- 1 Logistics Base, Shenzhen. (Unit 53310)
- 1 Motor Transport Company, Shao Fei

=== Bases ===
Bases within Hong Kong are former British facilities namely from the British Army:

- Central Barracks – PLA Ground Force – formerly HMS Tamar
- Ching Yi To Barracks – formerly part of Victoria Barracks and renamed from Queen's Lines Barracks
- Kowloon East Barracks – formerly Osborn Barracks
- Stanley Barracks – PLA Ground Force – home of 5-min Response Unit
  - Chek Chue Barracks
- Western Barracks – 88 Bonham Road– formerly Bonham Tower Barracks
- Stonecutter Barracks – PLAGF and PLAN
- Shek Kong Airfield, Shek Kong Barracks – PLA Air Force.
  - Northern Compound – formerly Borneo Lines
  - Southern Compound – formerly Malaya Lines
- San Tin Barracks – formerly Cassino Lines
- Tam Mei Barracks – Ngau Tam Mei in Yuen Long
- Gallipoli Lines – Sha Tau Kok Road in Fanling, formerly San Wai Camp
  - San Wai/Tai Ling Range
- Burma Lines - also known as Queen's Hill Camp
- Gun Club Hill Barracks Kowloon – home to PLA Garrison Hospital

=== Equipment ===
==== Vehicles ====
Model	Type	Details
Type 92	6 wheeled armored personnel carrier	Equipped with 12.7mm machine guns
Dongfeng EQ2050	Military light utility vehicle	Chinese copy of HMMWV
Jiefang CA-30	Utility truck	
JH600 Duke	Motorcycle	

==== Small arms ====
Model	Type	Origin	Caliber	References
QSZ-92	Semi-automatic pistol	Norinco	5.8×21mm DAP92	
QSZ-11	Semi-automatic pistol	Norinco	5.8×21mm DAP92	
QCW-05	Submachine gun	Norinco	5.8×21mm DAP92	
Type 56C	Assault rifle	Norinco	7.62×39mm	
QBZ-191	Assault rifle	Norinco	5.8×42mm	
QBZ-95	Assault rifle	Norinco	5.8×42mm	
QBZ-03	Assault rifle	Norinco	5.8×42mm	
Type 95	Light machine gun	Norinco	5.8×42mm	
Type 88	Sniper rifle	Norinco	5.8×42mm	
CS/LR4	Sniper rifle	Norinco	.308 Winchester	
Type 87	Grenade launcher	Norinco	35 mm grenade	

== Navy ==
The naval presence in Hong Kong is a limited sub-station with a small flotilla of ships rotating from bases in the mainland China:

=== Squadrons ===
- Squadron 38081 – a naval squadron of the South Sea Fleet

=== Bases ===
- Stonecutter's Island (Ngong Shuen Chau Naval Base) – formerly HMS Tamar, PLAN base
- Central military dock; near central barracks

=== Fleet ===
Various ships of the People's Liberation Army Navy visit the base, but only a few ships remain on semi-permanent basis.

Class or name	Builder	Type	Quantity	Year Entered Service	Details	Photos
Type 056 Jiangdao class	Huangpu Shipyard, Guangzhou, Guangdong	Corvette	2	2013	596 惠州 / Huizhou 597 钦州 / Qinzhou: 1 × AK-176 76 mm. gun; 2 × 30 mm. cannon; 2× 2-cell YJ-83 anti-ship missiles, amidships; 1 × 8-cell FL-3000N SAM launcher; 2 × triple 324 mm. torpedo tubes	
Type 074-II Yuhai class	Wuhu Shipyard of Wuhu, Anhui	Medium Landing Ship	3	2017-8	3357, 3358, and 3359 Two 25 mm guns	
Type 721	Guangxi Guiyang shipyard	Light transport boat	2	1990s	42 meters long, 8.8 meters wide and 2.14 meters tall. It has a full displacement of 140 tons, a speed of 33 knots and a maximum range of 300 nautical miles. It can carry 70 people and 2 tons of materials.	

== Air Force ==
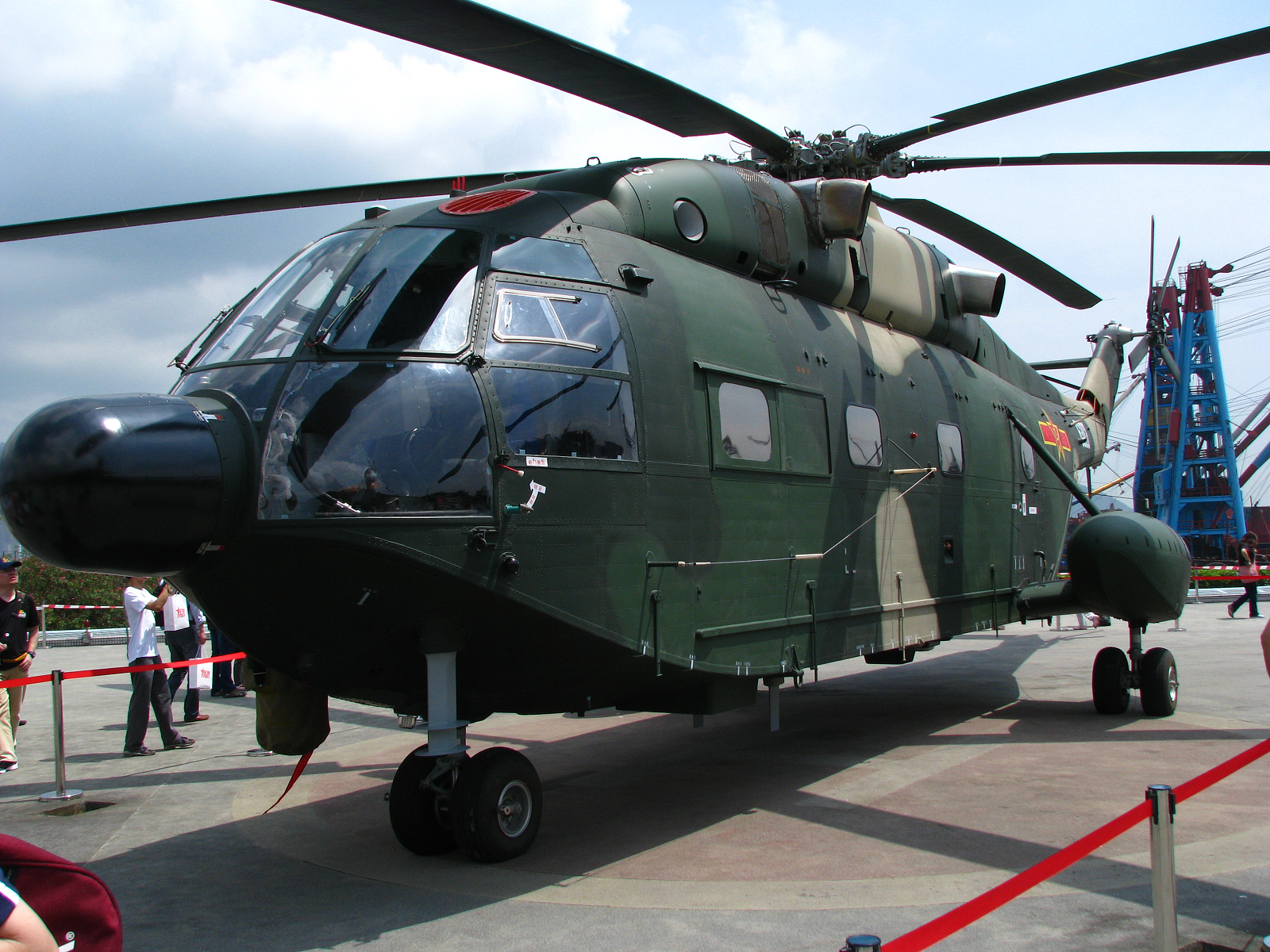
A Z-8KH of PLAAF

=== Units ===
- 1 helicopter squadron (PLAAF # 39968) at local Shek Kong Airbase
- 1 fighter squadron at Guangdong Airbase

=== Bases ===
PLA Hong Kong Garrison has three airbases, with two of these within Hong Kong:

- Shek Kong Airfield, Hong Kong
- Shadi Air Base, west of Guangzhou, Guangdong
- Joint Movement Unit, Chek Lap Kok – Hong Kong International Airport, Hong Kong

=== Aircraft inventory ===
Aircraft	Country of Manufacture	Type	In Service	Notes
Harbin Z-9	China	Utility helicopter	12 – at Shek Kong Airfield	Upgraded variant of AS 565 Panther and SA 360 Dauphin 2
Changhe Z-8KH	China	Search and rescue helicopter	4 – at Shek Kong Airfield	Licensed version of Aérospatiale SA 321 Super Frelon

== See also ==
- Macao Garrison
- British Forces Overseas Hong Kong
- Military of Portuguese Macau
- Japanese occupation of Hong Kong
