= Wang Xiaojun =

Chinese army general

- 王晓军
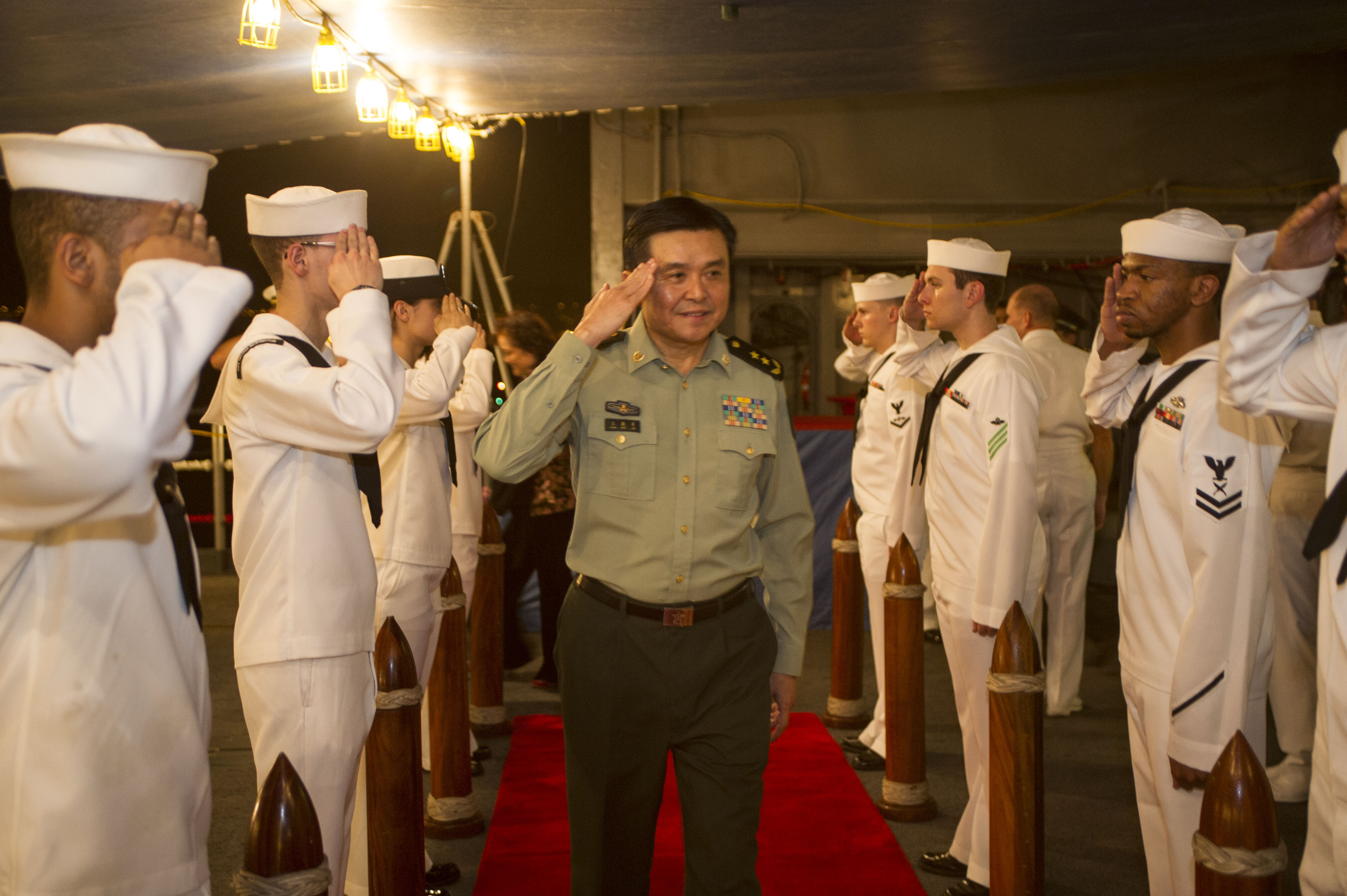
- Wang Xiaojun visiting USS George Washington in November 2013

Commander of the PLA Hong Kong Garrison
- In office October 2012 – July 2014
- Preceded by: Zhang Shibo
- Succeeded by: Tan Benhong

Personal details
- Born: September 1952 (age 74) Guantao, Hebei, China
- Party: Chinese Communist Party
- Education: Central Party School; PLA National Defence University

Military service
- Allegiance: People's Republic of China
- Branch/service: People's Liberation Army
- Years of service: 1969 − present
- Rank: Lieutenant General

Chinese name
- Simplified Chinese: 王晓军
- Traditional Chinese: 王曉軍
Transcriptions
Standard Mandarin
- Hanyu Pinyin: Wáng Xiǎojūn

Wang Xiaojun (Chinese: 王晓军; born September 1952) is a lieutenant general of the People's Liberation Army (PLA) of China. He has been deputy commander of the Guangzhou Military Region since July 2014, and formerly served as commander of the PLA's Hong Kong Garrison and the Hainan Military District.

== Biography ==
Wang Xiaojun was born in September 1952 in Guantao, Hebei province. He joined the PLA in December 1969, and the Chinese Communist Party in November 1970. He graduated from the Central Party School with a bachelor's degree. He also studied at the PLA National Defence University from 1997 to 1998.

He served as deputy commander of the PLA Hong Kong Garrison from 1999 to 2004, commander of the Hainan Military District from 2004 to 2012. He was also a member of the Hainan Provincial Party Standing Committee from 2007 to 2012. In October 2012 he was appointed commander of the PLA Hong Kong Garrison, replacing Zhang Shibo. In July 2014 he became deputy commander of the Guangzhou Military Region, and Lieutenant General Tan Benhong succeeded him as commander of the Hong Kong Garrison.

Wang attained the rank of major general in 1998, and lieutenant general (zhongjiang) in 2012.

Military offices
Preceded by Li Bixing	Commander of the PLA Hainan Military District; 2011–2014	Succeeded by Li Shilin
Preceded by Zhang Shibo	Commander of the PLA Hong Kong Garrison; 2012–2014	Succeeded by Tan Benhong
