= Yao Wenxu =

Chinese politician

Yao Wenxu (姚文绪; 1924 – 18 February 2010) was the chairman of the Hainan Provincial Committee of the Chinese People's Political Consultative Conference from August 1988 to February 1993. He was from Wafangdian, Liaoning. He was also a member of the 13th and 14th National Congresses of the Chinese Communist Party.
