= Guangxi University =

Provincial public university in Nanning, Guangxi, China

- 广西大学
- Former name: National Guangxi University
- Motto: 勤恳朴诚，厚学致新
- Motto in English: Diligent Simplicity and Honest Sincerity, Deep Learning and New Knowledge
- Type: Public
- Established: October 1928; 97 years ago
- Affiliations: Project 211, Double First Class University Plan
- Academic affiliations: Greater Mekong Sub-region Academic and Research Network
- Budget: ¥3.23 billion (2026)
- President: Xiao Jianzhuang
- Party Secretary: Xu Huarui
- Undergraduates: 26,459
- Postgraduates: 15,190
- Location: Nanning, Guangxi, China; 22°50′20″N 108°17′04″E
- Campus: 14.27 km^{2} (5.51 sq mi); Urban
- Colours
- Website: gxu.edu.cn english.gxu.edu.cn

Chinese name
- Simplified Chinese: 广西大学
- Traditional Chinese: 廣西大學
Transcriptions
Standard Mandarin
- Hanyu Pinyin: Guǎngxī Dàxué
Yue: Cantonese
- Jyutping: Gwong2sai1 Daai6hok6
- IPA: [kʷɔŋ˧˥.sɐj˥ taj˨.hɔk̚˨]

Guangxi University (广西大学) is a provincial public university in Nanning, Guangxi, China. It is affiliated with the Guangxi Zhuang Autonomous Region and co-funded by the regional government and the Ministry of Education. The university is part of Project 211 and the Double First-Class Construction.

The university helped pioneer higher education in central and southwestern China, where its faculty, students, and resources contributed to the creation of over 20 universities and academic departments during the mid 20th century. The university grants bachelor's, master's, and doctoral degrees across 27 colleges and departments and 98 undergraduate majors.

Established in 1928, the university was broken up during national education reforms in the 1950s. Its departments were relocated across China to create or bolster numerous other institutions including then Wuhan University, then Sun Yat-sen University, and then Guangxi Normal University.

== History ==
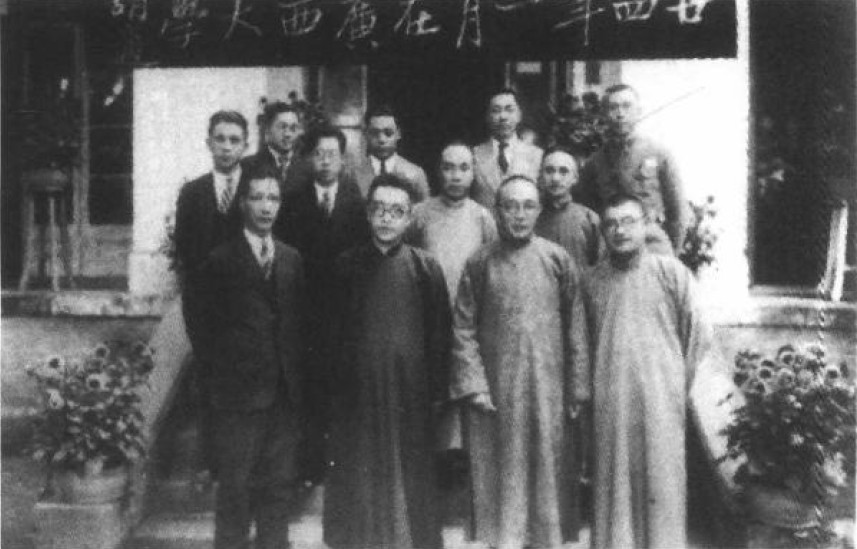
Notable Chinese philosopher and educator Hu Shih and friends on the campus of Guangxi University in 1935

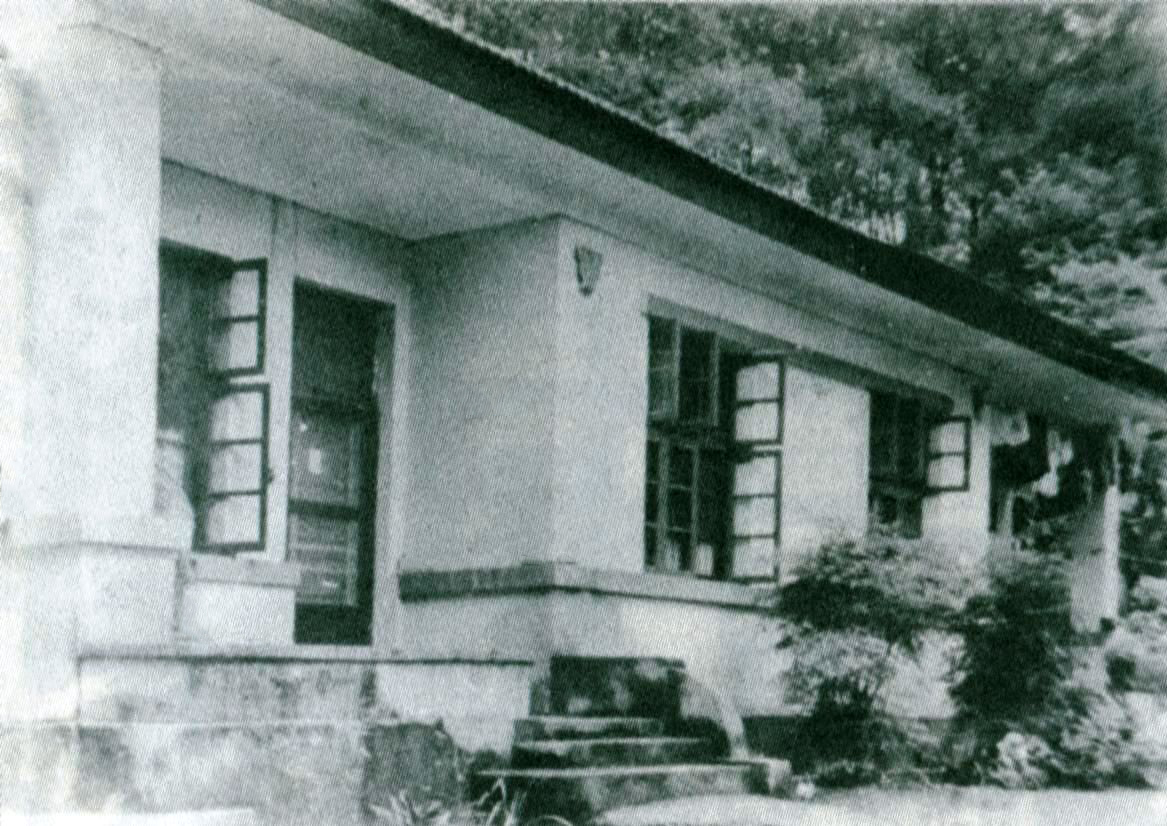
The Science Museum building on the Guilin campus of Guangxi University in 1952

=== Establishment and restructuring (1928–1938) ===
As early as 1925, the Guangxi provincial government began drafting plans to create Guangxi University. In the winter of 1927, the authorities invited scientist and educator Ma Junwu, a native of Guilin, Guangxi, to return to his homeland and help found the first modern university in the province. In October 1928, Guangxi University was established on Butterfly Mountain in the Hexi District of Wuzhou.

University operations were briefly suspended from 1929 to 1931 due to armed conflict in Guangxi and the neighboring Guizhou region.

In 1932, the provincial government established the Guangxi Provincial Teacher's College, an independent normal school in Guilin, Guangxi. However, in 1936, the government reorganized institutions of higher education. The Teacher's College was ordered to merge into Guangxi University, where it became part of the colleges of literature and law. The university also absorbed the Guangxi Provincial Medical College which became the Guangxi University School of Medicine. However, the authorities separated the university from its science and engineering faculties, which consolidated and became the independent Guangxi University of Science and Technology. Through these acquisitions and divestments, Guangxi University influenced the development of many institutions of higher education across Guangxi, a role it would retain during the education reorganization of the 1950s.

In 1936 Guangxi University relocated to a campus in the city of Guilin. There, the university established an Institute of Botany, several agricultural research facilities, and its Economic Research Institute.

=== National Guangxi University and war relocation (1939–1952) ===
In 1939, the Nationalist government expanded the university, adding several faculties including engineering and agriculture. As a result, the university was renamed National Guangxi University. The 40s and 50s would prove to be a difficult period of "great contributions and sacrifices" made by the newly named university, while also establishing its modern identity and impact as a contributor to the effort to establish higher education in central and southwestern China.

By the mid-1940s, the Second Sino-Japanese War, which had begun in 1931 with the Japanese invasion of Manchuria in northeast China, had reached southern China. In the summer of 1944, an imminent Japanese invasion of Guangxi forced National Guangxi University to evacuate its Guilin campus and move south to Rong County. The university began conducting classes out of eight conference halls. By November, the nearby city of Liuzhou had begun wartime preparations. The university was forced to leave Guangxi entirely, relocating a second time to neighboring Guizhou province.

During this temporary relocation, the university decided to continue its educational mission with a particular focus on nearby ethnic minority populations in Guangxi and southwest Guizhou provinces, including the Zhuang and Miao peoples. While moored in Rong County, faculty lectured on agriculture for local farmers and the university recruited a group of minority students into the colleges of agriculture, law, and business.

With the surrender of Japan in September 1945, National Guangxi University moved back to its home province, temporarily taking up residence at a campus by the Lijiang river in Liuzhou. In early 1946, the student body initiated a movement that brought the university back to its original campus on Butterfly Mountain in Wuzhou. Subsequently, in September 1946, National Guangxi University moved back to Guilin.

The 1950s began with several acquisitions of other institutions. In 1950 the National Nanning Teacher's College merged into the university and became the Guangxi University College of Teacher Education. In 1951, the undergraduate programs of the provincial Xijiang College were absorbed. The university created the independent, but affiliated Guangxi Agricultural College in 1952.

At the beginning of 1952, Chairman Mao Zedong personally inscribed the name "Guangxi University" in Chinese calligraphy. The university continues to use this name, and his calligraphy, today.

=== Downsizing and suspension to support the creation of new universities (1953–1958) ===
The year 1953 marked the beginning of a period of reorganization, dissolution, and eventual suspension of Guangxi University. That year, the nascent People's Republic of China began an unprecedented reorganization of Chinese higher education institutions on a national scale, with the goal of expanding access to higher education through the establishment of new colleges and universities.

As a relatively well-developed university with comprehensive academic departments, a large student body, and extensive materials, Guangxi University was called upon to sacrifice a significant portion of its resources in support of this national project. In the reallocation, a large portion of Guangxi University faculty, students, and equipment were sent away to 19 newly created institutions across central and southwestern China. The university underwent significant downsizing as a result.

On October 17, 1953, a total of 53 professors across the departments of history, foreign language, physics, chemistry, and mathematics, as well as 256 professors and instructors of the College of Teacher Education were separated from the university to form the new Guangxi Teacher's College (now Guangxi Normal University). Subsequently, the majority of academic departments at Guangxi University were relocated. The university gave up its mechanical engineering department, which was one of the earliest in China, as well as its electrical engineering department. The faculty, students, and resources of these two departments were reallocated to the newly created Huazhong Institute of Technology (now the Huazhong University of Science and Technology) and other institutions. The university transferred its chemical engineering department to the South China University of Technology, and its highly regarded civil engineering department to the Central South Civil Engineering Institute (now Hunan University). The department of mining and metallurgy was sent to Central South University. The agricultural departments were relocated to Hubei province and renamed the Huazhong Agricultural University. Both Wuhan University and Sun Yat-sen University split the personnel and resources of several departments.

Having sacrificed the majority of its faculty and students, the remnants of Guangxi University discontinued operations. The depleted university entered a dormant stage until 1958, awaiting reconstruction of its faculty and student body.

List of Guangxi University departments relocated to other institutions, 1952–1953
Name of recipient institution	City	Province	Name of relocated Guangxi University department(s)
Central South Institute of Mining and Metallurgy (now Central South University)	Changsha	Hunan	Chemistry, Mining and Metallurgy, Mathematics, Physics
Central South University of Civil Engineering and Architecture (now Hunan University)	Changsha	Hunan	Civil Engineering
Central South University of Political Science and Law (now Zhongnan University of Economics and Law)	Wuhan	Hubei	Law
Guangxi Teacher's College (now Guangxi Normal University)	Nanyang	Guangxi	Chinese, Education, Foreign Languages, History, Teacher Education
Huazhong Agricultural College (now Huazhong Agricultural University)	Wuhan	Hubei	Agriculture, Animal Husbandry
Huazhong Institute of Technology (now Huazhong University of Science and Technology)	Wuhan	Hubei	Mechanical Engineering
Huazhong Normal University (now Central China Normal University)	Wuhan	Hubei	Biology
Hunan Agricultural College (now Hunan Agricultural University)	Changsha	Hunan	Veterinary
Henan Agricultural College (now Henan Agricultural University)	Zhengzhou	Henan	Pesticide Research
Jiangxi Agricultural College (now Jiangxi Agricultural University)	Nanchang	Jiangxi	Veterinary
Nanchang University	Nanchang	Jiangxi	Foreign Languages (Russian faculty)
South China Agricultural College (now South China Agricultural University)	Guangzhou	Guangdong	Mechanical Engineering (Horticulture faculty)
South China Institute of Technology (now South China University of Technology)	Guangzhou	Guangdong	Chemical Engineering, Mechanical Engineering
Sun Yat-Sen University	Guangzhou	Guangdong	Chinese, Education, Foreign Languages, History, Teacher Education
Wuhan University	Wuhan	Hebei	Accounting and Banking, Chemistry, Civil Engineering, Economics, Foreign Languages (Russian faculty), Mathematics, Physics
Zhongnan Institute	Wuhan	Hubei	Biology
Zhongnan University of Finance and Economics	Wuhan	Hubei	Accounting and Banking, Economics

=== Revival and restoration (1958–1999) ===
In 1958, the Central People's Government approved a plan to reconstruct and reopen Guangxi University at a new campus in Nanning. The first step was to rebuild the engineering departments. In 1961, Guangxi University absorbed the Guangxi Institute of Technology and the Guangxi University of Science and Technology. Ironically, the latter university was composed of former departments of engineering that had been split from Guangxi University two decades ago. The university absorbed the Guangxi Forestry College in 1962, which became the basis for a new college of agriculture within the university.

In 1970, the Guangxi Labor University was merged into Guangxi Agricultural College, a separate institution affiliated with Guangxi University. The former college later changed its name to Guangxi Agricultural University.

In 1978, Guangxi University awarded its first master's degree.

In March 1997, the Ministry of Education approved the merger of Guangxi Agricultural University into Guangxi University, significantly strengthening its formerly depleted agricultural departments.

In 1998, the university awarded its first doctoral degree and was approved to establish three additional doctoral programs.

In 1999, Guangxi University was chosen to participate in Project 211, a national initiative to elevate research standards and faculty hiring resources for a select group of rising universities.

=== 21st century ===
With university-wide improvements as a result of increased government funding from Project 211, and the absorption of Guangxi Agricultural University bolstering its key agricultural departments, Guangxi University entered the 21st century.

In 2001, Guangxi University and the South China University of Technology, who had received the former university's chemical engineering department in 1953, entered into a counterpart agreement to support innovation at Guangxi University.

In 2004, the Ministry of Education approved Guangxi University to establish a new university in Guangxi with the aim of serving ethnic minority groups.

In December 2006, Guangxi University and Suan Dusit University co-founded the Confucius Institute in Suphanburi, Thailand. In September 2007, Guangxi University established the School of International Education, which enrolls and manages international students in university programs, teaches Chinese as a foreign language, and administers international collaboration partnerships and the university's overseas Confucius Institutes.

== Colleges and Departments ==
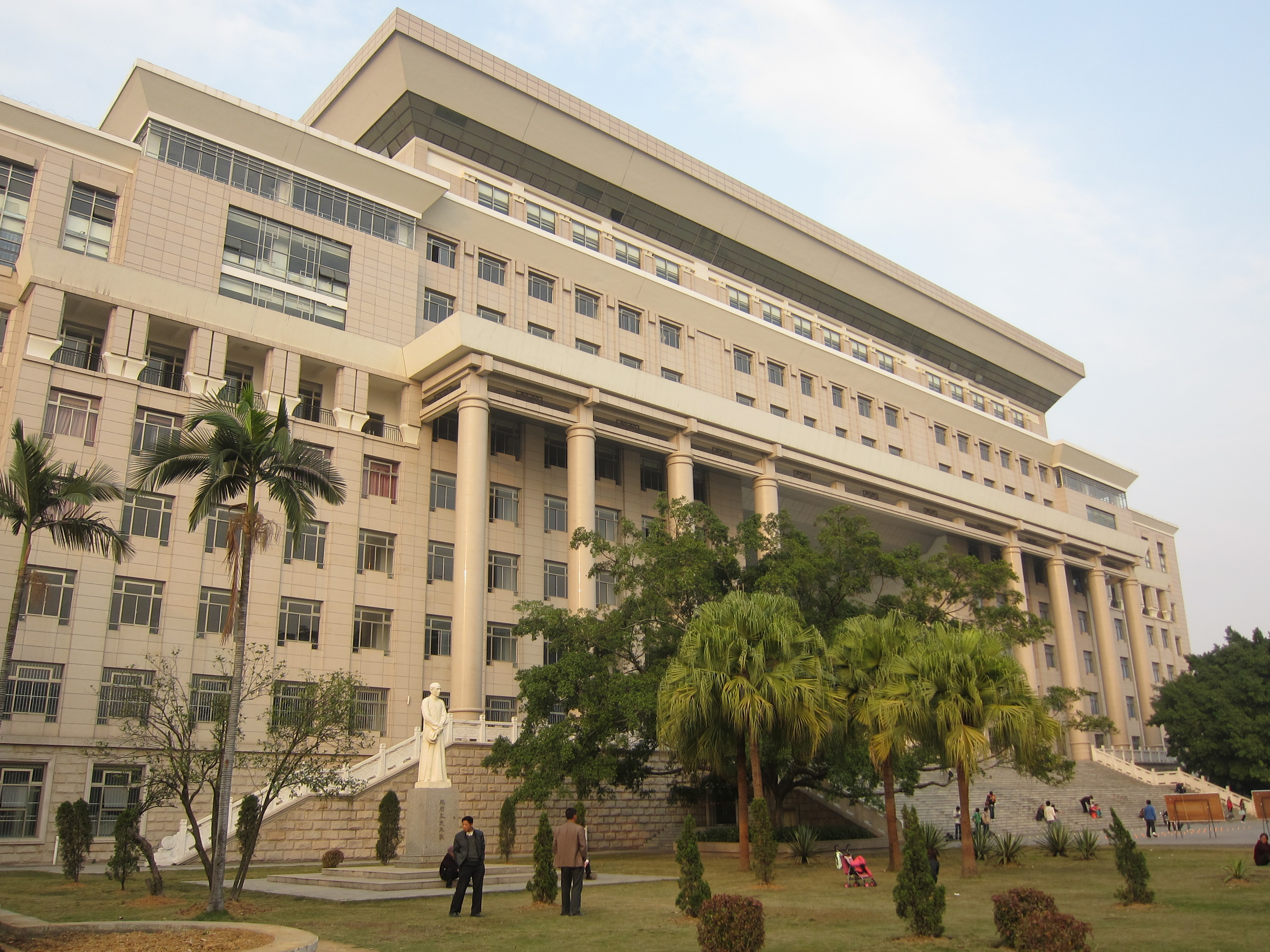
Academic building at Guangxi University

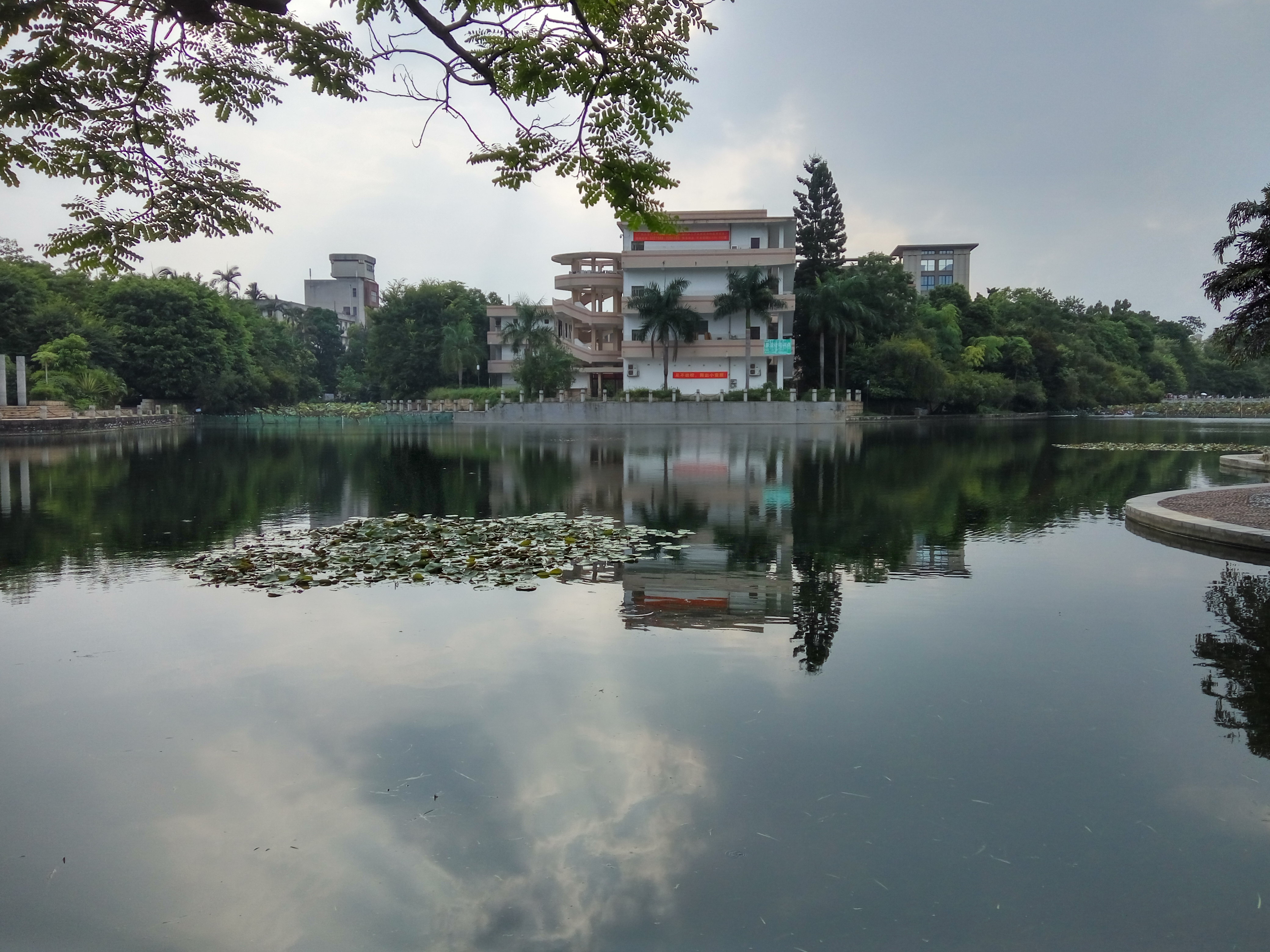
Biyun Lake, on the campus of Guangxi University

Guangxi University has 26 colleges and schools:

- College of Mechanical Engineering
- College of Electric Engineering
- College of Civil Engineering and Architecture
- College of Chemistry and Chemical Engineering
- College of Resources, Environment and Materials
- College of Light Industry and Food Engineering
- College of Computer, Electronics and Information
- College of Marine Sciences
- College of Life Science and Technology
- College of Agriculture
- College of Animal Science and Technology
- College of Forestry
- College of Mathematics and Information Science
- College of Physical Science and Technology
- College of Liberal Arts
- College of Journalism and Communication
- College of Foreign Languages
- College of Arts
- College of Public Policy and Management
- Business School
- Law School
- School of Marxism
- College of Physical Education
- International College
- College of Continuing Education
- Medical College

== Rankings and reputation ==
=== General Rankings ===
Guangxi University is consistently ranked the best in the Guangxi Zhuang Autonomous Region, one of the highly ranked universities in the South China region outside Guangdong Province, and among the top 100 nationwide.

As of 2025, Guangxi University was ranked 346th globally by the Performance Ranking of Scientific Papers for World Universities, and 288th in the world by the University Ranking by Academic Performance (URAP). The Academic Ranking of World Universities, also known as ShanghaiRanking, ranked Guangxi University in the top 301-400th in the world.

Generally, Guangxi University was ranked in the top 500 universities in the world by several major international universities rankings, including the Academic Ranking of World Universities, and the CWTS Leiden Ranking.

=== Research and Subjects Rankings ===
As of 2025. the CWTS Leiden Ranking ranked Guangxi University at #183 in the world based on their publications for the period 2020–2023. The Nature Index Annual Table 2025 by Nature Research ranked Guangxi University among the top 250 leading universities globally for the high quality of research publications in natural science. The U.S. News & World Report ranked Guangxi University among the top 400 best global universities in Engineering.

== Research Institutes ==
- China-ASEAN Research Institute

== See also ==
- Guangxi Normal University, at one point the Guangxi University Liberal Arts Institute
