= Tan Benhong =

Chinese military officer (born 1957)

- 谭本宏

Commander of the PLA Hong Kong Garrison
- In office July 2014 – April 2019
- Preceded by: Wang Xiaojun
- Succeeded by: Chen Daoxiang

Personal details
- Born: May 1957 (age 69) Cili County, Hunan, China
- Party: Chinese Communist Party
- Education: PLA Ground Force Commander Academy; Central Party School; Central China Normal University; Combined Arms Academy of the Armed Forces of the Russian Federation

Military service
- Allegiance: People's Republic of China
- Branch/service: People's Liberation Army
- Years of service: 1977−present
- Rank: Lieutenant general
- Commands: PLA Hong Kong Garrison

Chinese name
- Simplified Chinese: 谭本宏
- Traditional Chinese: 譚本宏
Transcriptions
Standard Mandarin
- Hanyu Pinyin: Tán Běnhóng

Tan Benhong (Chinese: 谭本宏; born May 1957) is a lieutenant general (zhongjiang) of the Chinese People's Liberation Army (PLA). He was commander of the PLA Hong Kong Garrison in Hong Kong from July 2014 until April 2019. Tan formerly served as commander of the Hainan Military District.

== Early life and education ==
Tan Benhong was born May 1957 in Cili County, Hunan province, China.

Tan joined the People's Liberation Army (PLA) and the Chinese Communist Party (CCP) in 1977. He enrolled at the PLA Ground Force Commander Academy, and studied management at Central Party School of the CCP and law at Central China Normal University. In 2001 he briefly attended the Combined Arms Academy of the Armed Forces of the Russian Federation in Moscow.

== Career ==
Tan has served in the Guangzhou Military Region for his entire career, and steadily rose through the ranks. He was appointed chief of staff of the PLA Hong Kong Garrison in May 2007, but was transferred to the 42nd Group Army to serve as its deputy commander only three months later. He attained the rank of major general in 2008, and in March 2010 he became deputy commander of a missile base of the Second Artillery Corps.

Tan was named commander of the Hainan Military District, which is part of the Guangzhou MR, in February 2011. In July 2014 he was appointed commander of the PLA Hong Kong Garrison, replacing Wang Xiaojun, who had become deputy commander of the Guangzhou MR. Tan was promoted to the rank of lieutenant general (zhongjiang) in July 2015.

== See also ==
- Military of Hong Kong
- Ngong Shuen Chau Naval Base

Military offices
Preceded by Li Shilin	Commander of the PLA Hainan Military District; 2011–2014	Succeeded by Zhang Jian
Preceded by Wang Xiaojun	Commander of the PLA Hong Kong Garrison; 2014–2019	Succeeded by Chen Daoxiang
