= Fu Wenhua =

Chinese military officer (born 1965)

- 付文化

Deputy Commander of the People's Armed Police
- Incumbent
- Assumed office March 2025
- Commander: Wang Chunning
- Political Commissar: Zhang Hongbing

Commander of Beijing Garrison
- In office April 2020 – March 2025
- Preceded by: Wang Chunning
- Succeeded by: vacant

Personal details
- Born: January 1965 (age 61) China
- Party: Chinese Communist Party
- Education: PLA Army Command Academy; PLA National Defence University

Military service
- Allegiance: People's Republic of China
- Branch/service: People's Liberation Army Ground Force (?–2025); People's Armed Police (2025–present)
- Rank: Lieutenant general

Fu Wenhua (Chinese: 付文化; pinyin: Fù Wénhuà; born January 1965) is a lieutenant general in the People's Armed Police of China.

He is an alternate of the 20th Central Committee of the Chinese Communist Party.

== Biography ==
Fu was born in January 1965, and graduated from the PLA Army Command Academy and PLA National Defence University, and once studied in Germany.

Fu served in the 16th Group Army (now 78th Group Army) for a long time. He joined the Chinese Communist Party (CCP) in June 1985. In 2016, he was appointed chief of staff of the 54th Group Army (now 83rd Group Army), succeeding Xu Qiling. He became chief of staff of the 81st Group Army in March 2017. On 30 July 2017, he led his troops to participate in the military parade celebrating the 90th Anniversary of the Founding of the People's Liberation Army. In April 2020, he was promoted to commander of Beijing Garrison. In June 2022, he was admitted to member of the Standing Committee of the CCP Beijing Municipal Committee, the capital city's top authority. In March 2025 he has been appointed to become the deputy commander of the Armed Police Force.

He attained the rank of major general (shaojiang) in July 2017. In March 2025 he attained the rank of a lieutenant general (zhongjiang).

Military offices
Preceded by Wang Chunning	Commander of Beijing Garrison; 2020–2025	Succeeded by TBA
Preceded by Zheng Jiagai	Deputy Commander of the People's Armed Police; 2025-present	Incumbent
