= Wu Lie =

- 吴烈
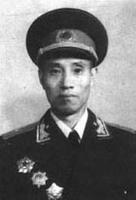
- Wu in 1955

Political Commissar of the PLA Beijing Garrison
- In office October 1976 – October 1987
- Preceded by: Liu Fu
- Succeeded by: Li Jinmin

Commander of the PLA Beijing Garrison
- In office January 1959 – April 1962
- Preceded by: New title
- Succeeded by: Zeng Mei

Personal details
- Born: 20 October 1915 Pingxiang County, Jiangxi, China
- Died: 19 August 2001 (aged 85) Beijing, China
- Party: Chinese Communist Party
- Education: Counter-Japanese Military and Political University; People's Liberation Army National Defense University

Military service
- Allegiance: People's Republic of China
- Branch/service: Chinese Red Army; Eighth Route Army; People's Liberation Army Ground Force
- Years of service: 1930–1985
- Rank: Major general
- Battles/wars: Second Sino-Japanese War; Chinese Civil War
- Awards: August 1 Medal (2nd Class); Order of Independence and Freedom (2nd Class); Order of Liberation (1st Class); Red Star Merit Honor Medal (1st Class)

Chinese name
- Simplified Chinese: 吴烈
- Traditional Chinese: 吳烈
Transcriptions
Standard Mandarin
- Hanyu Pinyin: Wu Lie

Wu Lie (Chinese: 吴烈; 20 October 1915 – 19 August 2001) was a founding major general in the People's Liberation Army of China.

== Biography ==
Wu was born in Pingxiang County (now Pingxiang), Jiangxi, on 20 October 1915.

In 1924, Wu left his hometown with his father and went to Anyuan to make a living. That same year, he enrolled in the Night School of Anyuan Road Mining Club and received revolutionary ideological education and influence. In 1925, he worked as a child laborer at the electrical boiler of Anyuan Coal Mine and participated in the Anyuan Road and Mine Workers' Club and Anyuan Workers' Strike Struggle, both led by the Chinese Communist Party. He enlisted in the Chinese Red Army in April 1930, and joined the Chinese Communist Party (CCP) in May of the same year. He was assigned to the Central Defense Force of the Chinese Red Army, responsible for guarding the leaders of the Chinese Red Army and the Central Committee of the Chinese Communist Party. In 1934, he took part in the Long March of the Central Chinese Red Army and arrived in northern Shaanxi. After leaving the security forces, he served as chief of staff of the 232nd Regiment of the 78th Division of the 15th Chinese Red Army, and was later promoted to the position of chief of staff of the division.

In September 1937, Wu enrolled at the Counter-Japanese Military and Political University, he continued to command the Central Guard Force in Yan'an and undertake garrison tasks after graduation. In 1946, he served in local armies of Rehe, and soon in 1947, he became commander of the 22nd Division of the 8th Column of the Northeast Democratic United Army, which was restructured to the 133rd Division of the 45th Army of the 4th Field Army of the People's Liberation Army. During the Chinese Civil War, he was present at the Liaoshen campaign and Pingjin campaign.

In May 1949, Wu served at the Pingjin Garrison Command of the North China Military Region and continued to command the garrison troops. After the establishment of the Public Security Army (now People's Armed Police) in August 1949, he was made chief of staff. He attained the rank of major general (shaojiang) in 1955. After the disbandment of the Public Security Army in 1957, he became deputy minister of the General Staff Security Department and subsequently commander of the PLA Beijing Garrison in January 1959. In 1961, he was accepted to the PLA Higher Military Academy (now People's Liberation Army National Defense University), after graduation he was appointed deputy commander of the Public Security Forces.

After the founding of the People's Liberation Army Second Artillery Force (now People's Liberation Army Rocket Force) in 1966, Wu was transferred to the force and was chosen as the Second Political Commissar. In 1968, the political commissar Li Tianhuan resigned and Wu briefly succeeded as political commissar before continuing to serve as the second political commissar. In April 1975, he was transferred to central China's Hubei province and appointed political commissar of the Wuhan Military District. In 1977, he was recalled to the PLA Beijing Garrison and appointed political commissar, concurrently serving as deputy political commissar of the Beijing Military Region. He retired in 1985.

On 19 August 2001, Wu died in Beijing, at the age of 85.

== Autobiography ==
- 《峥嵘岁月：开国少将吴烈回忆录》 [Turbulent Years: Memoirs of Founding Major General Wu Lie] (in Chinese). Beijing: Central Party Literature Press. 1999-09-01. ISBN 9787507306354.

Military offices
New title	Commander of the PLA Beijing Garrison; 1959–1962	Succeeded by Zeng Mei
Preceded by Liu Fu	Political Commissar of the PLA Beijing Garrison; 1976–1987	Succeeded by Li Jinmin
