= Toano =

Toano may refer to:

== Places ==
- Toano, Reggio Emilia, Emilia-Romagna, Italy, a comune
- Toano, Nevada, United States, a ghost town
- Toano, Virginia, United States, an unincorporated community
  - Toano Middle School
- Toano Range, a mountain range in Elko County, Nevada, United States

== Other uses ==
- Foton Toano, a 2015–present Chinese van
