= Li Jinmin =

Chinese military personnel (1926–2025)

- 李进民

Political Commissar of the PLA Beijing Garrison
- In office 1985–1990
- Commander: Li Zhongxuan; Yan Tongmao; Dong Xuelin
- Preceded by: Wu Lie
- Succeeded by: Zhang Baokang

Personal details
- Born: 1926 Pingdu County, Shandong, China
- Died: 22 January 2025 (aged 98) Beijing, China
- Party: Chinese Communist Party
- Education: PLA General Senior Infantry School

Military service
- Allegiance: People's Republic of China
- Branch/service: Eighth Route Army; People's Liberation Army Ground Force; People's Volunteer Army
- Years of service: 1938–1990
- Rank: Lieutenant general
- Battles/wars: Second Sino-Japanese War; Chinese Civil War; Korean War

Chinese name
- Simplified Chinese: 李进民
- Traditional Chinese: 李進民
Transcriptions
Standard Mandarin
- Hanyu Pinyin: Lǐ Jìnmín

Li Jinmin (Chinese: 李进民; 1926 – 22 January 2025) was a lieutenant general in the People's Liberation Army of China who served as political commissar of the PLA Beijing Garrison from 1985 to 1990.

== Life and career ==
Li was born in Pingdu County (now Pingdu), Shandong, in 1926.

Li enlisted in the Eighth Route Army in August 1938, and joined the Chinese Communist Party (CCP) in July 1943. During the Second Sino-Japanese War, he mainly fought against the Imperial Japanese Army in the Jiaodong region (now Qingdao, Yantai, Weihai). During the Chinese Civil War, he served in the war and engaged in the Battle of Laiwu, Menglianggu campaign, Battle of Jiaodong, Battle of South Shandong, Battle of East Henan, Huaihai campaign, Yangtze River Crossing campaign, and Shanghai campaign. In June 1950, Li was commissioned to accompany the People's Volunteer Army to Korea to participate in the Korean War.

Li returned to China in September 1952 and subsequently enrolled at the PLA General Senior Infantry School. After graduating in December 1954, Li was assigned to the 28th Group Army, where he was promoted to deputy political commissar in July 1971 and to political commissar in May 1978. He attained the rank of lieutenant general (zhongjiang) in 1988. In 85 he was promoted to become political commissar of the PLA Beijing Garrison, a position he held until 1990.

Li died in Beijing on 22 January 2025, at the age of 99.

Military offices
Preceded by Li Huaide	Political Commissar of the 28th Group Army; 1978–1985	Succeeded by Yin Wensheng
Preceded by Wu Lie	Political Commissar of the PLA Beijing Garrison; 1985–1990	Succeeded by Zhang Baokang
