= Zhou Yushu =

Chinese military personnel (1933–2021)

- 周玉书

Commander of the People's Armed Police
- In office January 1990 – November 1992
- Preceded by: Li Lianxiu
- Succeeded by: Ba Zhongtan

Personal details
- Born: 22 August 1933 You County, Hunan, China
- Died: 1 April 2021 (aged 87) Beijing, China
- Party: Chinese Communist Party
- Education: Zhengzhou Fourth Artillery School; PLA Military Academy; PLA National Defence University

Military service
- Allegiance: People's Republic of China
- Branch/service: People's Liberation Army Ground Force
- Years of service: 1953–1996
- Rank: Lieutenant general
- Unit: 24th Group Army
- Commands: Guangzhou Military Region

Chinese name
- Simplified Chinese: 周玉书
- Traditional Chinese: 周玉書
Transcriptions
Standard Mandarin
- Hanyu Pinyin: Zhōu Yùshū

Zhou Yushu (Chinese: 周玉书; 22 August 1933 – 1 April 2021) was a lieutenant general in the People's Liberation Army of China who served as commander of the People's Armed Police from 1990 to 1992.

He was a representative of the 19th National Congress of the Chinese Communist Party. He was an alternate member of the 13th Central Committee of the Chinese Communist Party and a member of the 14th Central Committee of the Chinese Communist Party. He was a member of the 9th National Committee of the Chinese People's Political Consultative Conference.

== Biography ==
Zhou was born in You County, Hunan, on 22 August 1933.

He enlisted in the People's Liberation Army (PLA) in September 1953, and joined the Chinese Communist Party (CCP) in September 1956. In 1945 he attended You County No. 1 High School. After graduating from Zhengzhou Fourth Artillery School in 1956, he was assigned to the 72nd Division of the 24th Group Army, where he eventually became commander in 1985. In 1976, he participated in the rescue of the 1976 Tangshan earthquake. In 1990, he was promoted to become commander of the People's Armed Police, a position he held until 1992. He was deputy commander of the Guangzhou Military Region in 1992, and held that office until 1996. During his term in office, he presided over the preparation of People's Liberation Army Hong Kong Garrison.

He was promoted to the rank of major general (shaojiang) in September 1988 and lieutenant general (zhongjiang) in December 1992.

On 1 April 2021, he died from an illness in Beijing, at the age of 87.

Military offices
Preceded by Li Lianxiu	Commander of the People's Armed Police; 1990–1992	Succeeded by Ba Zhongtan
