= Wang Chunning =

Chinese general

Armed Police General Wang Chunning
- 王春宁
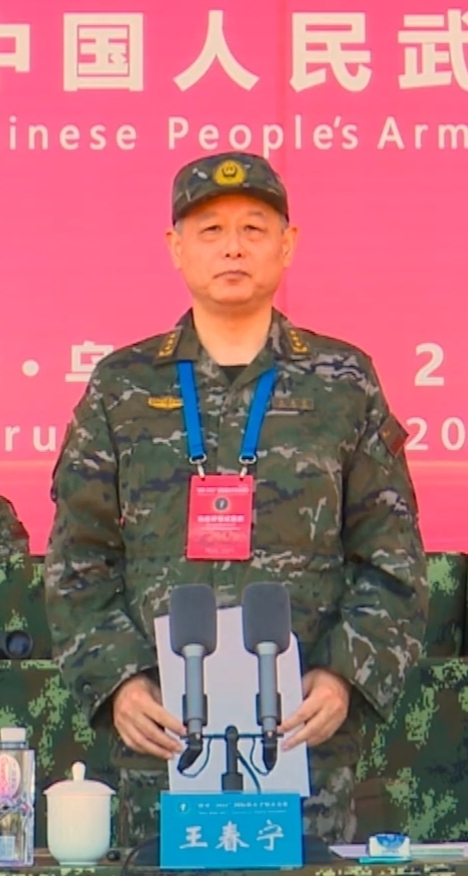
- Wang in Ürümqi, Xinjiang in 2023

Commander of the People's Armed Police
- In office December 2020 – July 2025
- Preceded by: Wang Ning
- Succeeded by: Cao Junzhang

Chief of Staff of the People's Armed Police
- In office April 2020 – December 2020
- Preceded by: Zheng Jiagai
- Succeeded by: TBA

Personal details
- Born: March 1963 (age 63) Nanjing, Jiangsu, China
- Party: Chinese Communist Party (expelled in 2025)
- Occupation: Military officer

Military service
- Allegiance: People's Republic of China
- Branch/service: People's Liberation Army Ground Force (?–2020); People's Armed Police (2020–present)
- Years of service: ?-2025
- Rank: Armed Police General

Chinese name
- Traditional Chinese: 王春寧
- Simplified Chinese: 王春宁
Transcriptions
Standard Mandarin
- Hanyu Pinyin: Wáng Chūnníng

Wang Chunning (Chinese: 王春宁; born March 1963) is a former general of the People's Liberation Army of China, and commander of the People's Armed Police. He was promoted to the rank of major general (shaojiang) in 2011, lieutenant general (zhongjiang) in July 2017, and general (Shangjiang) in December 2020.

== Biography ==
Wang was born in Nanjing, Jiangsu, in March 1963, while his ancestral home is in Muping District of Yantai, Shandong. His father Wang Yongming was a lieutenant general.

He entered politics in July 1985, and joined the Chinese Communist Party (CCP) in April 1986. In 2009 he was promoted to chief of staff of the 1st Group Army. He was its deputy commander in 2010, and held that office until 2014. In January 2014 he succeeded Han Weiguo as commander of the 12th Group Army. In August 2016, he was appointed commander of the Beijing Garrison. In January 2020, he became a member of Standing Committee of the CCP Beijing Municipal Committee. In April 2020, he was appointed chief of staff of the People's Armed Police. He was promoted to its commander in December of that same year. In July 2025 it was reported that Wang was replaced by Lieutenant General Cao Junzhang who became the acting commander of the People's Armed Police.

== Downfall ==
On September 12, 2025, The Standing Committee of the National Peoples Congress announces that the Armed Police Force had removed Wang as a deputy to the National People's Congress. Along him were 3 other military officers which includes: Lieutenant General Zhang Lin, Lieutenant General Gao Daguang and Lieutenant General Wang Zhibin. On October 17, 2025, the Ministry of National Defense announced that he was expelled from the CCP and the PLA for "serious violations of discipline and law".

Military offices
Preceded by Han Weiguo	Commander of the 12th Group Army; 2014–2016	Succeeded by Position revoked
Preceded by Pan Liangshi	Commander of the Beijing Garrison; 2016–2020	Succeeded by Fu Wenhua
Preceded by Zheng Jiagai	Chief of Staff of the People's Armed Police; 2020–2020	Succeeded by Zhou Youya
Preceded by Wang Ning	Commander of the People's Armed Police; 2020-2025	Succeeded by Cao Junzhang
