= Cao Junzhang =

Commander of the Chinese People's Armed Police

- 曹均章

Acting Commander of the People's Armed Police
- Incumbent
- Assumed office July 2025
- Preceded by: Wang Chunning

Personal details
- Born: 1965 (age 60–61) Chongqing, China
- Party: Chinese Communist Party
- Occupation: Military officer

Military service
- Allegiance: People's Republic of China
- Branch/service: People's Liberation Army Ground Force (?–2023); People's Armed Police (2023–present)
- Years of service: ?-present
- Rank: Armed Police Lieutenant General
- Unit: Chengdu Military Region 13th Group Army 76th Group Army Joint Logistics Support Force People's Armed Police

Cao Junzhang (Chinese: 曹均章; born 1965) is a lieutenant general of the People's Armed Police and is currently serving as its acting commander replacing General Wang Chunning.

== Biography ==
Cao Junzhang has served in the Chengdu Military Region, having hold the posts of director of the Operations Department of the Chengdu Military Region Command, division commander of the 13th Group Army, and chief of staff of the Sichuan Provincial Military Region. After the 2015 military reforms he was to become the deputy commander of the 13th Army. In 2017 he was reassigned to the deputy commander of the 76th Group Army of the People's Liberation Army. In April 2020, he was appointed deputy commander of the Joint Logistics Support Force. In March 2023, Cao Junzhang was reappointed to the position of the deputy commander of the Armed Police Force. In 2025 it was announced that he was replacing General Wang Chunning, becoming the acting commander of the Armed Police Force.

Military offices
| Preceded by Wang Chunning | Acting Commander of the People's Armed Police; 2025-present | Incumbent |
