= Pan Liangshi =

Member of Chinese People's Liberation Army

- 潘良时

Commander of the Beijing Garrison
- In office December 2013 – July 2016
- Preceded by: Zheng Chuanfu
- Succeeded by: Wang Chunning

Personal details
- Born: October 1956 (age 69–70) Qinghe County, Hebei, China
- Party: Chinese Communist Party
- Education: PLA Artillery Academy; PLA National Defence University

Military service
- Allegiance: China
- Branch/service: People's Liberation Army
- Years of service: 1972 – present
- Rank: Lieutenant General

Pan Liangshi (Chinese: 潘良时; born October 1956) is a lieutenant general of the Chinese People's Liberation Army (PLA). He served as commander of the Beijing Garrison from 2013 to 2016.

== Biography ==
Pan Liangshi was born in October 1956 in Qinghe County, Hebei Province. He enlisted in the PLA in December 1972, and joined the Chinese Communist Party in December 1974. He graduated from the PLA Artillery Academy, and has a master's degree from the PLA National Defence University.

Pan served as a brigade commander and chief of staff of the 40th Group Army. He became chief of staff of the 39th Group Army in September 2007, and commander of the 39th Army in January 2008. In December 2013, he was appointed commander of the strategically important Beijing Garrison. He replaced Lieutenant General Zheng Chuanfu, who had been promoted to deputy commander of the Beijing Military Region. He became a member of the Beijing Municipal Committee of the Chinese Communist Party in February 2015.

Pan attained the rank of lieutenant general (zhong jiang) in July 2015. He was an alternate of the 18th Central Committee of the Chinese Communist Party.
