= Zheng Jiagai =

Chinese paramilitary officer (1962–2024)

- 郑家概

Chief of Staff of the People's Armed Police Force
- In office September 2017 – April 2020
- Preceded by: Qin Tian
- Succeeded by: Wang Chunning

Chief of Staff of the Northern Theater Command Ground Force
- In office January 2017 – September 2017
- Preceded by: New title
- Succeeded by: ?

Personal details
- Born: April 1962 Shimen County, Hunan, China
- Died: 19 April 2024 (aged 61–62) Beijing, China
- Party: Chinese Communist Party
- Education: Nanjing Army Command Academy; PLA National Defense University; Frunze Military Academy

Military service
- Allegiance: People's Republic of China
- Branch/service: People's Armed Police Force
- Years of service: 1979–2024
- Rank: Lieutenant general

Chinese name
- Simplified Chinese: 郑家概
- Traditional Chinese: 鄭家概
Transcriptions
Standard Mandarin
- Hanyu Pinyin: Zhèng Jiāgài

Zheng Jiagai (Chinese: 郑家概; April 1962 – 19 April 2024) was a lieutenant general in the People's Armed Police Force of China who served as chief of staff. He was promoted to the rank of major general (shaojiang) in July 2011 and lieutenant general (zhongjiang) in September 2017.

== Biography ==
Zheng was born in the town of Moshi, Shimen County, Hunan, in April 1962. He was a descendant of Zheng Dongguo, a graduate of the Whampoa Military Academy, who took part in the Eastern Expedition and Northern Expedition, and one of the earliest Kuomintang generals to engage in the Second Sino-Japanese War. He graduated from Nanjing Army Command Academy, PLA National Defense University, and Frunze Military Academy.

Zheng enlisted in the People's Liberation Army (PLA) in November 1979, and joined the Chinese Communist Party (CCP) in 1984. He served in the 2nd Company of the 173rd Regiment of the 58th Division of the 20th Army Group in Xiangcheng County, Henan.

In May 2010, he became deputy commander and chief of staff of the 20th Group Army. He was appointed deputy chief of staff of the Jinan Military Region in April 2015, a position he held until January 2017, when he was commissioned as chief of staff of the Northern Theater Command Ground Force. He was elevated to chief of staff of the People's Armed Police Force in September 2017.

Zheng died in Beijing on 19 April 2024.

Military offices
New title	Chief of Staff of the Northern Theater Command Ground Force; 2017	Succeeded by ?
Preceded by Qin Tian	Chief of Staff of the People's Armed Police Force; 2017–2020	Succeeded by Wang Chunning
