= Li Lianxiu =

Chinese military and police officer

Li Lianxiu

Li Lianxiu (Chinese: 李连秀; December 1923 – 10 November 2019) was a Chinese military and police commander with the rank of lieutenant general. A veteran of the Second Sino-Japanese War, the Chinese Civil War, and the Korean War, he was appointed Commander of the 38th Army of the People's Liberation Army in 1978. In 1984, he was appointed the second Commander of the People's Armed Police (PAP), a year after its founding, serving until his retirement in 1990.

== Republic of China ==
Li was born in December 1923 into a tenant peasant family Yinan County, Shandong, Republic of China. During the Second Sino-Japanese War, he enlisted in the Eighth Route Army in August 1938 and joined the Chinese Communist Party in the same year. Serving in the Shandong Column and later as a platoon commander in the 115th Division of the Eighth Route Army, he participated in almost 100 battles against Japanese invaders in Shandong.

After the surrender of Japan in 1945, Li became a member of the Northeastern Democratic United Army (later Fourth Field Army of the People's Liberation Army), and fought in many battles of the Chinese Civil War, including Siping, Liaoxi, Tianjin, and the Yangtze River Crossing Campaign. During the war he was promoted to company and then battalion commander.

== People's Republic of China ==
After the founding of the People's Republic of China in 1949, Li served as Commander of the 337th Regiment of the 38th Army and studied at the PLA National Defence University. Upon graduation, he was deployed to North Korea in 1952 to participate in the Korean War. In his first battle of the war, he was credited with taking over Height 200 on the 38th parallel from American forces. His unit participated in the Battle of Tokchon, during which the 38th Army took over the city of Tokchon and inflicted substantial losses on the 7th Infantry Division of South Korea.

Upon his return from Korea, Li was promoted to Deputy Commander of the 112th Division and later Commander of the 114th Division. He was awarded the rank of lieutenant colonel in 1955 and colonel in 1960. He was appointed Deputy Commander and Chief of Staff of the 38th Army in July 1969, and promoted to Commander of the 38th Army in May 1978.

=== Commander of the People's Armed Police ===
In 1984, Li was transferred to the People's Armed Police (PAP), which had been established a year before, to serve as its second commander. He was awarded the rank of lieutenant general in January 1989. In October 1987, he led the PAP operation to put down the Tibetan unrest.

During the 1989 Tiananmen Square protests and massacre, Li reportedly instructed Xu Qinxian, his former subordinate and successor as Commander of the 38th Army, not to suppress the protesters without the approval of all three leaders of the Central Military Commission—Deng Xiaoping, Zhao Ziyang, and Yang Shangkun—knowing that Zhao would not approve such an order. Xu refused to lead the army to Beijing and was subsequently relieved of his command. When the 38th Army entered Beijing under a new commander, the PAP was ordered to open a path for the army through the barricades and protesters on the roads leading to the Tiananmen Square. In the night of 3 June, the PAP forces were able to reach the square without causing bloodshed, using only stun batons and fibreglass shields to dispel the crowds, whereas the 38th Army that followed them opened fire on the protesters and committed the Tiananmen Square massacre. According to Gao Xin of Radio Free Asia, this was a major embarrassment for the Chinese government and the military. A few months after the crackdown, Li and three other top officers of the PAP were dismissed in February 1990, and he officially retired.

Li was a delegate to the 12th and 13th National Congress of the Chinese Communist Party. He also served as a member of the 8th Chinese People's Political Consultative Conference.

Li died on 10 November 2019 in Beijing, aged 95.
