= People's Armed Police =

Chinese paramilitary organization

People's Armed Police Force
- Flag of the Force (since 10 January 2018)

- Roundel of People's Armed Police helicopters

- Badge of the Force (since 1 August 2021) (Note: The Badge of the Chinese PAP Force (中国人民武装警察部队徽) was determined by the Central Military Commission and officially put into use on August 1, 2021, in accordance with the 2020 revision of the National Defense Law's Article 28. Traditionally subject to the Public Security system, the PAP used the Police Badge of the Chinese People's Police (1983) as its symbol and cap insignia. But from 2007, the PAP cap insignia is slightly different from the civil People's Police badge by using olive green instead of police blue on the shield and adding the olive branches alongside the pine branches around the shield.)

- Sleeve badge of the Force
- Common name: 武警部队 (Wǔjǐng Bùduì; 'Armed Police Force')
- Abbreviation: PAP ("People's Armed Police"); ~~CAPF~~ ("Chinese Armed Police Force"), formerly abbreviated Wujing (武警; Wǔjǐng; 'Armed Police'), or WJ as on vehicle license plates
- Motto: 为人民服务 (Serve the People)

Agency overview
- Formed: 19 June 1982; 44 years ago (de facto); 5 April 1983; 43 years ago
- Employees: 1.5 million

Jurisdictional structure
- National agency (Operations jurisdiction): China
- Operations jurisdiction: China
- Legal jurisdiction: People's Republic of China
- Governing body: Central Military Commission
- Constituting instrument: 《中华人民共和国人民武装警察法》 (People's Armed Police Law of the People's Republic of China)
- General nature: Gendarmerie
- Specialist jurisdictions: Paramilitary law enforcement, counter insurgency, riot control; Coastal patrol, marine border protection, marine search and rescue

Operational structure
- Overseen by: Central Military Commission
- Headquarters: Haidian District, Beijing
- Agency executives: PAP General Cao Junzhang, Acting Commander; Vacant, Political Commissar; PAP General Zhou Jianguo, Chief of Staff
- Parent agency: Central Military Commission
- Child agencies: PAP Internal Guard Corps: 32 × Corps; PAP mobile units - 1st Mobile Corps and 2nd Mobile Corps; Chinese Coast Guard

Notables
- Anniversaries: August 1st; April 5

Website
- chinamil.com.cn

Chinese People's Armed Police Force
- Simplified Chinese: 中国人民武装警察部队
- Traditional Chinese: 中國人民武裝警察部隊
Transcriptions
Standard Mandarin
- Hanyu Pinyin: Zhōngguó Rénmín Wǔzhuāng Jǐngchá Bùduì

People's Armed Police
- Simplified Chinese: 人民武装警察
- Traditional Chinese: 人民武裝警察
Transcriptions
Standard Mandarin
- Hanyu Pinyin: Rénmín Wǔzhuāng Jǐngchá

China Armed Police
- Simplified Chinese: 中国武警
- Traditional Chinese: 中國武警
Transcriptions
Standard Mandarin
- Hanyu Pinyin: Zhōngguó Wǔjǐng

Armed Police [Force]
- Simplified Chinese: 武警［部队］
- Traditional Chinese: 武警［部隊］
Transcriptions
Standard Mandarin
- Hanyu Pinyin: Wǔjǐng [Bùduì]

The People's Armed Police Force, abbreviated PAP, (Note: Chinese: 中国人民武装警察部队; pinyin: Zhōngguó Rénmín Wǔzhuāng Jǐngchá Bùduì; abbreviation: 武警 (Wǔjǐng)) is a Chinese gendarmerie organization primarily responsible for internal security, riot control, counter-terrorism, disaster response, law enforcement and maritime rights protection as well as providing support to the People's Liberation Army (PLA) during wartime.

Unlike the civilian People's Police, (Note: Chinese: 人民警察; pinyin: Rénmín Jǐngchá) the PAP is a specialized paramilitary force reporting directly to the Central Military Commission (CMC) of the Chinese Communist Party (CCP). PAP officers and soldiers wear dark olive green uniforms, different from pine green uniforms of the People's Liberation Army Ground Force (PLAGF) or the light blue and black uniforms of the People's Police. Additionally, People's Armed Police police officers are active duty service members and receive veteran's benefits.

The PAP is estimated to have a total strength of 1.5 million. It was established in its current form in 1982, but similar security forces have operated since the founding of the People's Republic of China in 1949. During the Maoist era, the PAP's predecessors were the Chinese People's Public Security Force, initially under the MPS, and later the Public Security Corps which was under the command of the PLA.

== History ==
The history of the People's Armed Police is as long as that of the People's Republic, and its origin can be traced back to the People's Liberation Army, which was responsible for both defending the nation from foreign invasions and maintaining internal security. Although the force was officially established in 1982, its constituent units stretch back to 1949.

=== People's Public Security Force ===
In July 1949, the CMC decided to establish the Ministry of Public Security (MPS) with Luo Ruiqing as its minister to organize the public security forces in the nation. In August 1949, several security and public order units of the Fourth Field Army were consolidated into the Central Column of the Chinese People's Public Security Force (PSF) to guard the Party and State leaders and to keep the public order in the capital. The Central Column provided security for the inauguration ceremony of the People's Republic. From December 1949 to May 1950, regional security forces, along with the now dissolved Central Column, had been consolidated into divisions under the PSF.

The PSF was assigned to the PLA and became the PLA Public Security Force in September 1950, and the PLA Public Security Corps in July 1955, reporting under the Central Military Commission of the CCP and the National Defense Council of the People's Republic. Luo Ruiqing was appointed as the commander and political commissar of the PSF in September 1950 and remained on the posts until 1959, retaining the command of the PSF.

As of 1960, the Public Security Corps was organized in 8,200-strong Public Security Divisions, which were deemed not capable of independent, sustained, full-scale combat operations.

=== People's Armed Police Force ===
After numerous reorganizations and transfers of control between the PLA and the MPS, the People's Armed Police was created on 19 June 1982, combining the previous armed police, border guards and China Fire Services. The headquarter was set up in the MPS as a subordinate department. The establishment of the PAP highlighted the efforts to increase the professionalization of the security apparatus, as well as the absorption of numerous PLA demobilized personnel, in the wake of growing unrest. The PAP was officially founded on April 5, 1983.

The PAP was led by both the local government and superior PAP forces, which is called "Dual-Leadership" (双重领导). In practice, the local government (including the local party committee, local people's government and the local public security bureau) carries more weight. However, there were many confusions and loopholes caused by this ambiguous organization structure.

In the mid and late 1990s, CCP general secretary Jiang Zemin significantly expanded and strengthened the PAP, with more than 100,000 new troops. Jiang praised the PAP, describing it as "a major force for maintaining state security and social stability, the People's Armed Police shoulders a massive and formidable burden" and deployed it extensively in Xinjiang and Tibet.

Up until 2013, the Border Defense Corps Coast Guard was a part of the PAP. In 2013, it was separated and transferred to the direct control of the Ministry of Public Security and the State Oceanic Administration. However, in March 2018, it was announced that the Coast Guard would be placed under the People's Armed Police Force once again since the State Oceanic Administration was disbanded, but now as an independent branch reporting directly to PAP headquarters.

=== 2017–2018 Reform ===
Until 31 December 2017, the People's Armed Police had a dual command structure including the Central Military Commission (CMC) and the State Council through the Ministry of Public Security (MPS).

Prior to the 2018 reform, the People's Armed Police was further divided into eight corps: Internal Guard, Gold, Forestry, Hydropower, Transportation, Border Defense, Firefighting, and Safeguard Corps. The Internal Guard Corps, which makes up for the bulk of PAP, is under the PAP Headquarters and reports thus to the party central committee and the CMC (Central Military Commission). The Gold, Forestry, Hydropower, and Transportation Corps, collectively known as the Specialist Corps, were by then under the joint leadership of PAP Headquarters and their respective ministries in the State Council. The Border Defense, Firefighting, and Guard Corps, collectively known as the Public Security Corps, were then under the direct supervision of the Ministry of Public Security (MPS).

By law however, the PAP operates separately from the PLA. and, in terms of conducting public security operations and relevant capability building, the PAP Headquarters is under the leadership and command of the Ministry of Public Security (MPS).

From 1 January 2018, command of the People's Armed Police is jointly held by the CCP central committee and the Central Military Commission (CMC), with the PAP no longer subordinate to the State Council.

The reform was reportedly carried out in order to deprive the local Chinese Communist Party authorities of the power to use the PAP units to commit abuses or against the leadership in Beijing, especially after the Wang Lijun incident in which the PAP was allegedly abused by provincial party secretary Bo Xilai to surround the US Consulate in Chongqing after a falling out with Wang, the police chief of Chongqing at the time. Under the 2018 reforms, local authorities now need central approval in order to deploy the PAP.

On 10 January 2018, the PAP received a new flag following the design of the branch flags of the PLA with three olive stripes at the bottom. The three olive stripes represents the People's Armed Police responsible for the three main tasks and force composition of maintaining national political security and social stability, maritime rights protection and law enforcement, and defense operations.

On 21 March 2018, the Central Committee of the Chinese Communist Party unveiled a reform plan for the People's Armed Police Force as part of the deepening the reform of the Party and state institutions. Under this plan, the non-combatant elements of the PAP, the Gold, Forestry, Hydropower, Border Defense, Firefighting, and Guard Corps, are to be removed and the CCG is to be consolidated with PAP. As of March 2018, the PAP is working with the Central Committee and the relevant organs for the transfer of non-combatant elements into civil service. The Transportation Corps is the only remaining component of the Specialist Corps.

Until 2018, the Specialist Corps were responsible in constructing and maintaining highways and roads, surveying mineral deposits, fighting forest fires, and constructing large scale waterworks like dams and levees as well as for water works maintenance. The PAP is also called upon in emergency rescue and disaster relief operations within the PRC via the specialist and public security forces which can be forward deployed during such operations.

==== Organizational changes ====
With the 2018 reforms, Specialist Corps other than the Transportation Corps have been placed under other ministries. China Coast Guard (CCG) was transferred from State Council to PAP command, and the Transportation Corps has some units under the Mobile Corps.

The Border Defense Corps and Guards Corps have been absorbed by the Ministry of Public Security (MPS). The Forestry Corps were merged with the China Fire Services (also known as the firefighting corps) of the MPS and reorganized as China Fire and Rescue (CF&R), it was placed under the Ministry of Emergency Management. The Gold Corps and Hydropower Corps have been transformed into state-owned enterprises under the supervision of the relevant State Council ministries (Ministry of Natural Resources and China National Gold Group Corporation and China Aneng Construction Corporation, respectively).

=== Chronology ===
From the establishment of the People's Republic of China in 1949, the paramilitary public security force has been reorganized numerous times. The current designation since 1982, the People's Armed Police, was first used between 1959 and 1963.

- 1949–1950: Chinese People's Public Security Force, under the Ministry of Public Security (MPS)
- 1950–1955: Public Security Force, under the People's Liberation Army (PLA)
- 1955–1959: Public Security Corps, under the PLA
- 1959–1963: People's Armed Police, under the joint leadership of the MPS and the PLA
- 1963–1966: Chinese People's Public Security Force, under the joint leadership of the MPS and the PLA
- 1966–1982: PLA Internal Guard, absorbed into the PLA in an integrated structure. In 1971 and 1973, some units were transferred to the MPS
- 1982–present: People's Armed Police (PAP)

== Mission and operations ==
The People's Armed Police is formally regulated by the People's Armed Police Law of the People's Republic of China (中华人民共和国人民武装警察法), adopted and effective since 27 August 2009.

The People's Armed Police's primary mission is internal security. The Law on the People's Armed Police Force (PAPF), passed in August 2009, giving it statutory authority to respond to riots, terrorist attacks or other emergencies. Such units guard government buildings at all levels (including party and state organizations, foreign embassies and consulates), provide security to public corporations and major public events, as well as counter-terrorism and handling of public emergencies. Some units guard civilian prisons and provide executioners for the state. The PAP also maintains tactical counter-terrorism (CT) units such as the Snow Wolf Commando Unit and various Special Operations/Police units.

In the Chinese policing system, the PAP is tasked with managing protests (otherwise referred to as "mass incidents") and protecting important facilities and events, while public security police investigates crime and maintain public order. The PAP assists the regular police in high-risk operations, set up roadblocks and protects crime scenes. It also conducts preventive patrol under the leadership of the public security bureaus, sometimes in conjunction with them. When dealing with mass incidents and armed offenders, responsibility shifts to the People's Armed Police.

The PAP maintains units tasked with responding to any possible armed mutinies by PLA soldiers. In wartime deployments the PAP can assist the Ground Force and the Navy.

=== International operations ===
While the People's Armed Police is principally charged with internal security and guarding key facilities and installations, it also operates as part of the international security efforts of the People's Republic of China, against both terrorism and organized crime. Mathieu Duchâtel for The National Bureau of Asian Research identifies the legal basis of the PAP missions abroad in Article 71 of the 2015 Counter-terrorism Law. According Armed Police Force University professor Zhou Jian, counterterrorism is a task provided by law for the People's Armed Police and operating missions abroad is an "irreplaceable means".

The People's Armed Police send personnel abroad to receive training or provide training and participates in counter-terrorism exercises, especially across Central Asia in bilateral and multilateral agreements. PAP special operations forces are also deployed in the Chinese embassies of Baghdad and Kabul for the purposes of protection of diplomatic staff and property.

Since 2011, the People's Armed Police has also conducted operations along the Mekong river with the security forces of Thailand, Myanmar and Cambodia. These operations are aimed against organized crime.

Since 2014, the People's Republic of China established a security cooperation with Tajikistan and Afghanistan on Afghan border, near the Wakhan Corridor and in Gorno-Badakhshan Autonomous Region. The People's Armed Police is the main force for both bilateral and trilateral counterterrorism operations (mainly reconnaissance patrols in remote areas), being deployed south of Shaymak; the PAP has also conducted training for Tajik security forces.

The Border Defense Corps has also been deployed in UN Peacekeeping operations. Between 2006 and 2018, the Border Defense Corps was deployed in peacekeeping 10 times, with a total of 1325 officers being deployed for peacekeeping. This includes MINUSTAH, where out of eight Chinese peacekeeping deaths in the 2010 Haiti Earthquake three were Border Defense Corps officers. The Border Defense Corps was also deployed in UNMIL, where on October 28, 2017, where the 5th PAP Deployment to Liberia (part of the Guangxi Border Defense Corps) was awarded the "Liberia National Outstanding Contribution Award" by the Liberian Government.

=== Comparisons to foreign agencies ===
The PAP has been compared by both Chinese and foreign scholars with the gendarmerie forces found in many countries, most famously the French Gendarmerie, but the main inspiration for the PAP's establishment and operation came from the Internal Troops of the Soviet Union and related paramilitary forces of the Eastern Bloc such as the East German Alert Units, adapted to the specific military-political culture and thinking of the Chinese Communist Party (CCP) leadership. It has also sometimes been compared by Chinese media to the US National Guard.

== Leadership ==
Commander:

Commander	Took office	Left office	notice
Li Gang	January 1983	October 1984	
Li Lianxiu	October 1984	January 1990	
Zhou Yushu	January 1990	December 1992	
Ba Zhongtan	December 1992	February 1996	
Yang Guoping	February 1996	December 1999	
Wu Shuangzhan	December 1999	December 2009	
Wang Jianping	December 2009	December 2014	
Wang Ning	December 2014	December 2020	
Wang Chunning	December 2020	July 2025	
Cao Junzhang	July 2025		

Political Commissar:

Political Commissar	Took office	Left office	notice
Zhao Cangbi	January 1983	July 1983	
Liu Fuzhi	July 1983	October 1984	
Li Zhenjun	October 1984	November 1985	
Zhang Xiufu	November 1985	January 1990	
Xu Shouzeng	January 1990	December 1992	
Zhang Shutian	December 1992	February 1996	
Xu Yongqing	February 1996	December 2003	
Sui Mingtai	December 2003	September 2007	
Yu Linxiang	September 2007	July 2010	
Xu Yaoyuan	July 2010	September 2014	
Sun Sijing	December 2014	January 2017	
Zhu Shengling	January 2017	March 2019	
An Zhaoqing	March 2019	January 2022	
Zhang Hongbing	January 2022	December 2025	

== Training ==
The People's Armed Police has a number of training institutions, likely overseen by the Training Bureau of the Staff Department.

- Engineering University of People's Armed Police (Corps Leader Grade, led by a Major General)
- People's Armed Police Command Academy (Corps Leader Grade, led by a Major General)
- Logistics University of People's Armed Police Force (Corps Leader Grade, led by a Major General)
- Officers college of People's Armed Police (Deputy Corps Leader Grade, led by a Major General)
- People's Armed Police Special Police Academy (Deputy Corps Leader Grade, led by a Major General)
- China Coast Guard Academy
- Non-commissioned Officer School of the People's Armed Police

New constables of the People's Armed Police are drawn from the general military conscription pool, but they are trained in the People's Armed Police basic training units.

According to Zi Yang, the state of the education and training system as of 2016 suffered of issues which negatively affected the quality of education.

=== People's Armed Police Academy ===
The People's Armed Police Academy tasked with officer education and training for duties related to the missions entrusted to the People's Armed Police, including, since 2001, UN peacekeeping. The People's Armed Police Academy is headquartered in Langfang, of Hebei. The People's Armed Police Academy started to recruit cadets in 1984; since 1997, it has begun to issue bachelor's degrees; in 2003 it was allowed to issue master's degrees. According to a 2019 source, it is subordinate to the Ministry of Public Security. The PAP Academy is a Corps Leader Grade command, and thus it is led by a major general who serves as Superintendent. All graduates to the academy are commissioned into the PAP as Second Lieutenants (equivalent of Ensigns for those commissioned into the Coast Guard).

=== People's Armed Police Logistics Academy ===
The People's Armed Police Logistics Academy is a training body aimed to train People's Armed Police personnel in handling logistics. According to Unit Tracker, the university include subjects as applied economics, military and paramilitary logistics, as well as engineering. The Logistics Academy is a Corps Leader Grade command, and thus it is led by a major general.

== Organization ==
=== Headquarters ===
The People's Armed Police Headquarters is the leading and commanding organ that directs and administers all the units and provides guidance to it. The PAP has a commander, a political commissar and several deputy commanders and deputy political commissars. The PAP also has departments responsible for logistical and political matters and several speciality departments.

Following adjustment and reorganization, the People's Armed Police is mainly composed of the territorial forces, the mobile forces, and the Coast Guard.

The People's Armed Police Headquarters, placed at Theater Command Grade, include five Departments directly under the Headquarters:

- Staff Department (Deputy Theater Command Grade);
  - Training Bureau (Division Leader Grade);
  - Intelligence Bureau (Division Leader Grade), led by Zhang Xiaoqi;
- Political Work Department (Deputy Theater Command Grade): led by Director Lieutenant general Gao Wei;
  - Propaganda Bureau (Division Leader Grade);
  - Soldier and Civilian Personnel Bureau (Division Leader Grade);
- Discipline Inspection Commission (Deputy Theater Command Grade);
- Logistics Department (Corps Leader Grade);
- Equipment Department (Corps Leader Grade).

Being of Theatre Command Grade, the People's Armed Police is led by a full General.

=== Mobile corps ===
Mobile corps (Chinese: 机动总队; pinyin: jīdòng zǒngduì), often mistranslated as "Contingents" are large formations without fixed areas of responsibility. Two were created after the 2018 reforms; most of the subordinate units came from the 14 disbanded mobile divisions. Mobile corps are corps leader grade formations commanded by major generals.

The mobile corps are mainly responsible for dealing with terrorism, violent crime, riots, and public security threats. The 1st Mobile Corps is based in Shijiazhuang, Hebei, south of Beijing. The Corps covers northern and central China, including Beijing. The 2nd Mobile Corps is headquartered in Fuzhou, with units concentrated in Fujian and surrounding provinces along the coast (covering eastern and southern China).

=== Internal security forces ===
The major part of the PAP is the nèiwèi bùduì (Chinese: 内卫部队); translations include "internal security forces", "internal security troops", and "internal guards corps". Internal security forces are divided into provincial-level formations with geographical areas of responsibility. They are subordinated to PAP headquarters; the 2017-2018 reforms removed control of PAP units from local government. Internal security forces are focused on domestic security missions, maintaining stability in western China, guarding government compounds, disaster relief, and responding to major anti-government unrest.

The public security zǒngduì (Chinese: 总队) is the provincial formation. They are called "corps" by the PAP; Western analysts have used "contingent", "general corps", and "detachment". Most are corps deputy leader grade formations. The exceptions are the Beijing and Xinjiang corps which are corps leader grade; their subordinate entities, except for the logistics and equipment bureaus, are one grade higher than in the other corps. As Special Administrative Regions, Hong Kong and Macau do not have corps. Corps have mobile detachments and duty detachments (Chinese: 执勤支队; pinyin: zhíqín zhīduì).

Duty detachments protect government compounds and perform routine duties; they may exist because the CCP lacks confidence in the ability of local public security forces to handle "mass incidents".

Mobile police detachments (Chinese: 机动支队; pinyin: jīdòng zhīduì) are rapid reaction units roughly corresponding to PLAGF regiments or brigades. Some were existing corps mobile units before the reforms. Most were transferred from the disbanded mobile divisions. Most corps have one. In general, western provinces with large non-Han population have more than those in China's interior.

Corps are further subdivided at lower administrative levels. Regimental or brigade-level police detachments (Chinese: 支队; pinyin: zhīduì) are found in provinces, prefectures, and specifically designated cities. Battalions (Chinese: 大队; pinyin: dadui) are located in districts of the important cities and counties. Companies (Chinese: 中队; pinyin: zhōngduì) are found in counties. All corps have subordinate elementary command colleges.

=== Transportation units ===
Prior to the 2018 reforms, the People's Armed Police Transportation Corps (Chinese: 武警交通部队) was its own independent corps under the dual command of the PAP and the Ministry of Transport. During the 2018 reforms, the Transportation Corps was reorganized into part of the 1st and 2nd mobile corps. The mission of Transport units of the People's Armed Police is to conduct disaster relief and emergency repair on highways, bridges, tunnels, seaports railways and airports, security to construction projects related to national security along with law enforcement duties on highways in border regions.

==== History ====
The lineage of the 1st Transportation Detachment, 2nd Mobile Corps dates back to the 2nd World War, when it was known as the Laiyuan guerilla detachment of the Jin-Cha-Ji Military district. It participated in the Chinese civil war, WW2 and the Korean war. After becoming part of the PLA Basic Engineering Corps it was deployed to build the Duku Highway in 1974 in which 47 personnel lost their lives.

Prior to 1984, the transportation corps was part of the People's Liberation Army Basic Engineering Corps.

The 7th Transportation Detachment assisted in disaster relief after the 2015 Tianjin explosions.

The 6th Detachment of the transportation corps deployed 105 officers and 48 vehicles for urban search and rescue duties during the 2015 Shenzhen landslide.

==== Organization (Post-2018) ====
After the 2018 reforms, the transportation corps was reorganized into 5 detachments in the 1st and 2nd Mobile Corps:

- 1st Transportation Detachment, 1st Mobile Corps - Stationed in Beijing
- 2nd Transportation Detachment, 1st Mobile Corps - Stationed in Chang'an District, Xi'an
- 1st Transportation Detachment, 2nd Mobile Corps- Stationed in Hefei, Anhui
- 2nd Transportation Detachment, 2nd Mobile Corps - Stationed in Mianyang, Sichuan
- 3rd Transportation Detachment, 2nd Mobile Corps - Stationed in Bomê County, Nyingchi, Tibet Autonomous Region

==== Controversy ====
In 2015, ex-Transportation corps commander Major General Liu Zhanqi, ex-Transportation corps Political commissar Major General Wang Xin and ex-Transportation Corps Chief engineer Major General Miao Guirong were arrested on June 16, July 31 and September 15 respectively on corruption-related charges as part of the anti-corruption campaign under Xi Jinping. As of September 16, 2015, a total of 43 people were arrested in relation to the case.

=== China Coast Guard ===
The Chinese People's Armed Police Force Coast Guard Bureau, also abbreviated as China Coast Guard is the agency for maritime search and rescue and law enforcement in the territorial waters of the People's Republic of China. The China Coast Guard was formerly the maritime branch of the People's Armed Police (PAP) Border Security Force under the Ministry of Public Security until 2013. In March 2013, China announced it would form a unified Coast Guard commanded by the State Oceanic Administration. This renewed Coast Guard has been in operation since July 2013. As of July 1, 2018, the China Coast Guard was transferred from civilian control of the State Council and the State Oceanic Administration, to the People's Armed Police, ultimately placing it under the command of the Central Military Commission (CMC).

According to Joel Wuthnow, the Coast Guard Command within the People's Armed Police possibly is of Corps Leader Grade, led by a Commandant who is usually holding Major General (Rear Admiral) rank.

In June 2018, China Coast Guard was granted maritime rights and law enforcement akin civilian law enforcement agencies in order to carry out contrast of illegal activities, keep peace and order, as well as safeguarding security at sea, when performing duties related to the use of marine resources, protection of marine environment, regulation of fishery, and anti-smuggling.

=== Special Operations units ===
The People's Armed Police maintains several Special Operations Units, also known by Western sources as "Special Police units". They were established in Beijing in early 1980s and in 1983 the first of them was transferred to the People's Armed Police as the People's Armed Police Special Police Group. In 1985 the Group became People's Armed Police Special Police School and, in 2002, it became the People's Armed Police Special Police Academy. In 2002, the Snow Wolf Commando Unit, since 2007 Snow Leopard Commando Unit, was established in Beijing as the second special police unit. According to Joel Wuthnow, the Snow Leopard Commando Unit was moved from the Beijing Corps to the 2nd Mobile Corps in 2018.

The special operations units are tasked to carry out counter terrorism missions, riot control, anti-hijacking and bomb disposal.

Local special operations units receive Explosive Ordinance Disposal (EOD) training, fast roping, counterinsurgency tactics, along with training in hostage rescue and hostage negotiation.

==== Structure of Special operational units ====
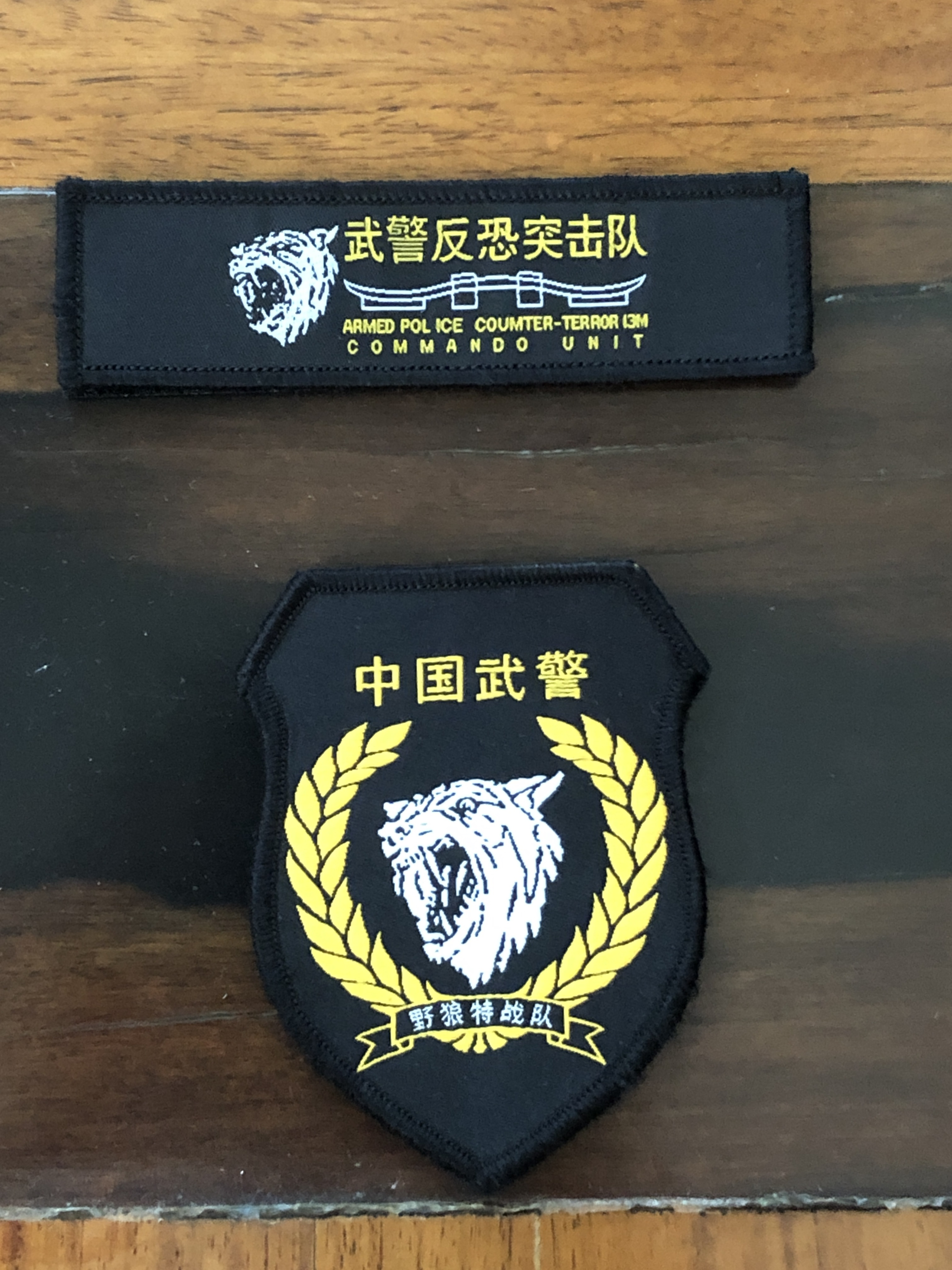
Insignia of the Wild Wolf unit

Special Police Units/Special operations units are organized and placed at the Municipal and Provincial level.

In addition, the 1st and 2nd Mobile Corps maintain a total of 5 Special Operations Detachments.

Municipal detachments each have their own Special Operations Company, which is typically placed under the municipal mobile battalion. Each provincial corps (Chinese: 总队; pinyin: Zǒngduì) establishes and maintains a special operations detachment as part of its own territorial organization. The provincial special operations detachment of the Xinjiang Corps is the Mountain Eagle Commando Unit. In some provincial corps, the special operations unit is battalion or company sized and is placed under the mobile detachment.

The Hebei Corps Mobile Detachment's 1st Special Operations Company is known as the "Sky Sword" unit (Chinese: 天剑突击队). It can trace its lineage back to the 7th Company, 3rd Battalion of the 28th Group Army's 84th Infantry Division's 251st Regiment which was involved in the Battle of Jinan and the Huaihai campaign. In its entire history, it was deployed to approximately 50 law enforcement/disaster relief operations, won gold or silver in 100+ competitions and was awarded first class meritorious service medals 1 time, 2nd class meritorious service medals 5 times and 3rd class meritorious service medals 12 times.

The Shenzhen Detachment's Special Operations Company is known as the "Wild Wolf" unit (Chinese: 野狼特战队). It was founded in 2005 and given the name in 2008.

The Jinan Detachment's Special Operations Company is known as the "Lightning Commando Unit" (Chinese: 闪电突击队) it was founded in 2009 and only had 30 members at the start.

==== Border Defense Corps Special Operations units ====
Badge of the Snowy Eagle Female Special Service team
- https://photo.81.cn/pla/2015-03/19/content_6398233_5.htm

Flag of the Snowy Eagle Female Special Service team
- https://photo.81.cn/pla/2015-03/19/content_6398233_8.htm

In April 2012, the Xinjiang Border Defense Corps Female Special Service team (新疆公安边防总队女子特勤分队) was founded. In March 2015 it was renamed to the "Snowy Eagle Female Special Service team" (雪鹰女子特勤分队) at the Xinjiang Border Corps Training Base. At its founding in 2012, it only had 6 members, and by March 2015 it had 34 members. It assisted in security at the China Eurasia Expo multiple times.

The Shenzhen Border Defense Detachment operated the Maritime Special Service Team (Nicknamed "Maritime Jiaolongs"), a police tactical unit which is dedicated to maritime anti-terrorism, search and rescue, combat diving and VBSS.

== Communications ==
Using the national information infrastructure, the PAP has established a preliminary system of three-level integrated information networks, linking general headquarters with the grass-roots squadrons.

== Equipment ==
In response to the needs of the People's Armed Police, the service provides for the use of many types of weapons. Special Operation Forces of People's Armed Police uses various kind of weapons according to necessity of missions.

Name	Country of origin	Type	Notes
QSZ-92	China	Semi-automatic pistol	Standard issue sidearm
QCW-05	China	Personal defense weapon	
QCQ-171	China	Submachine gun	
QBZ-95	China	Assault rifle	
QBZ-191	China	Assault rifle	
Norinco CQ	China	Assault rifle	
Type 81	China	Assault rifle	
QBZ-03	China	Assault rifle	
QBS-06	China	Underwater assault rifle	Used by Snow Leopard Commando Unit
QBS-09	China	Shotgun	
QBU-88	China	Sniper rifle	
Type 85 sniper rifle	China	Sniper rifle	
Remington M700	United States	Sniper rifle	
CS/LR4	China	Sniper rifle	
Type 69 RPG	China	Rocket launchers	
PF-98	China	Rocket launchers	Used by Snow Leopard Commando Unit
Crossbows	China		Used due to crossbows being more silent than firearms
QBB-95	China	Light machine gun	
Heavy machine guns	China	Heavy machine gun	
Mortars	China	Mortar	

In addition, the People's Armed Police makes use of remotely-controlled technologies such as unmanned aerial vehicles, advanced surveillance technology and bomb disposal robots, as well as intelligent unmanned systems. K9s and ballistic shields are also used.

Drones and Mini UGVs are often used for recon.

=== Vehicles ===
People's Armed police vehicles can be identified with their Vehicle registration plates which start with WJ.

- NJ2046 armored van
- Dongfeng EQ2102 truck (Also used by China Fire Services)
- FAW Jiefang trucks
- Dongfeng EQ2050 light utility vehicle
- ZSL-92A Armored Personnel Carrier
- CSK-181 Infantry mobility vehicle
- CSZ-181 Infantry mobility vehicle - Used by Snow Leopard Commando Unit
- Iveco power daily patrol van
- Ford Transit police van(sometimes unmarked)
- Roewe W5 police car
- Unmarked Mitsubishi Pajero police car
- Unmarked Toyota Land Cruiser police car
- Unmarked Toyota Coaster minibus
- Foton Toano military ambulance
- Excavators
- Bulldozers
- Bridge-laying vehicle
- Hyundai Trago dump truck
- Wheel loaders

=== Vessels ===
The PAP Ganzhou Detachment have been seen with speedboats for search and rescue during floods. The Snow Leopard Commando Unit also uses speedboats when raiding terrorist hideouts in islands.

=== Helicopters ===
- Harbin Z-20 - Used by Gansu Corps and 2nd Mobile Corps
- Changhe Z-8 - Used by Hunan Corps and Forestry Corps (defunct; 8 operated; handed over to National Fire and Rescue Administration)
- Harbin Z-9 - Used by Hunan Corps since September 2015
- Mil Mi-17
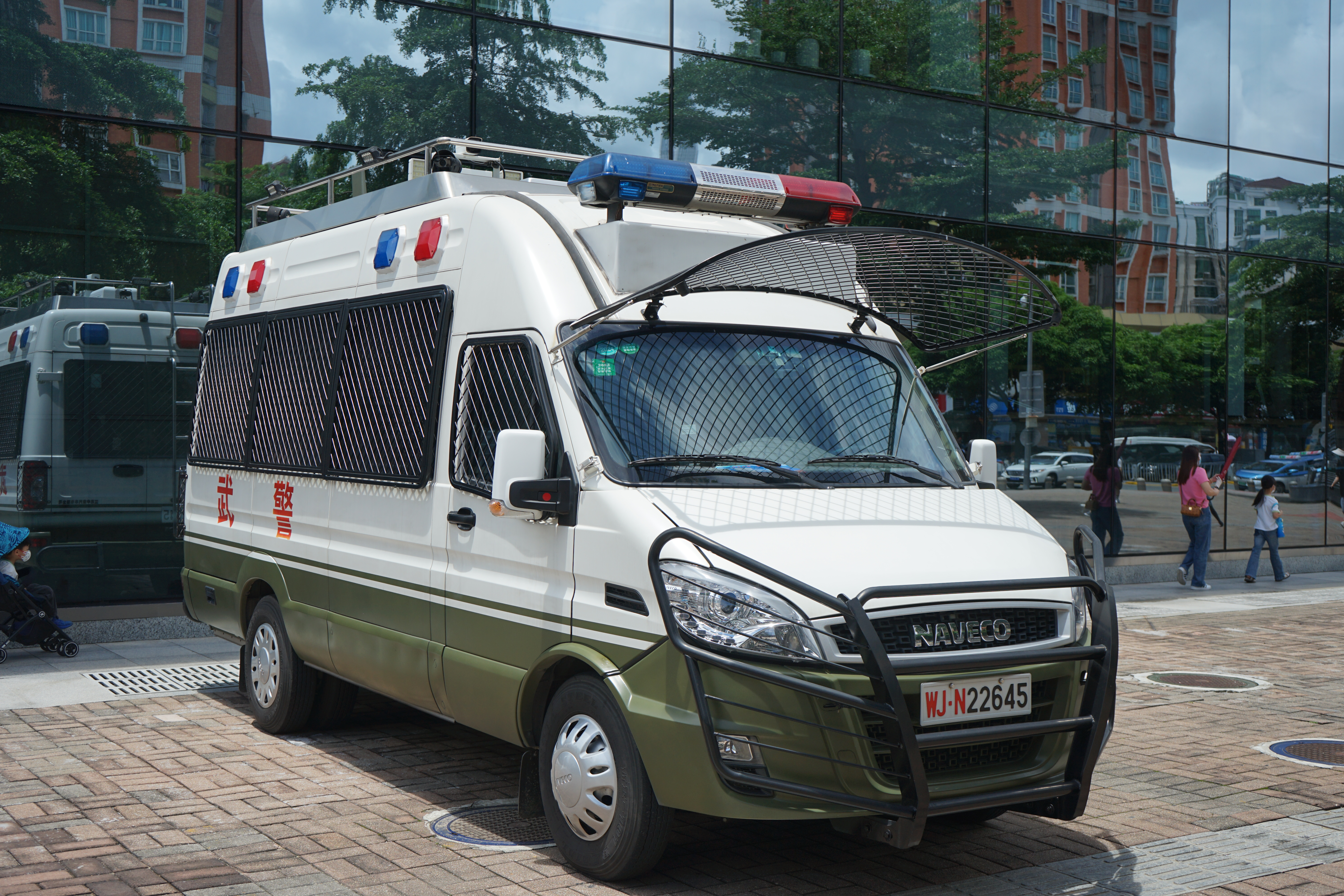
Guangdong Corps Shenzhen Detachment Iveco Power Daily police van

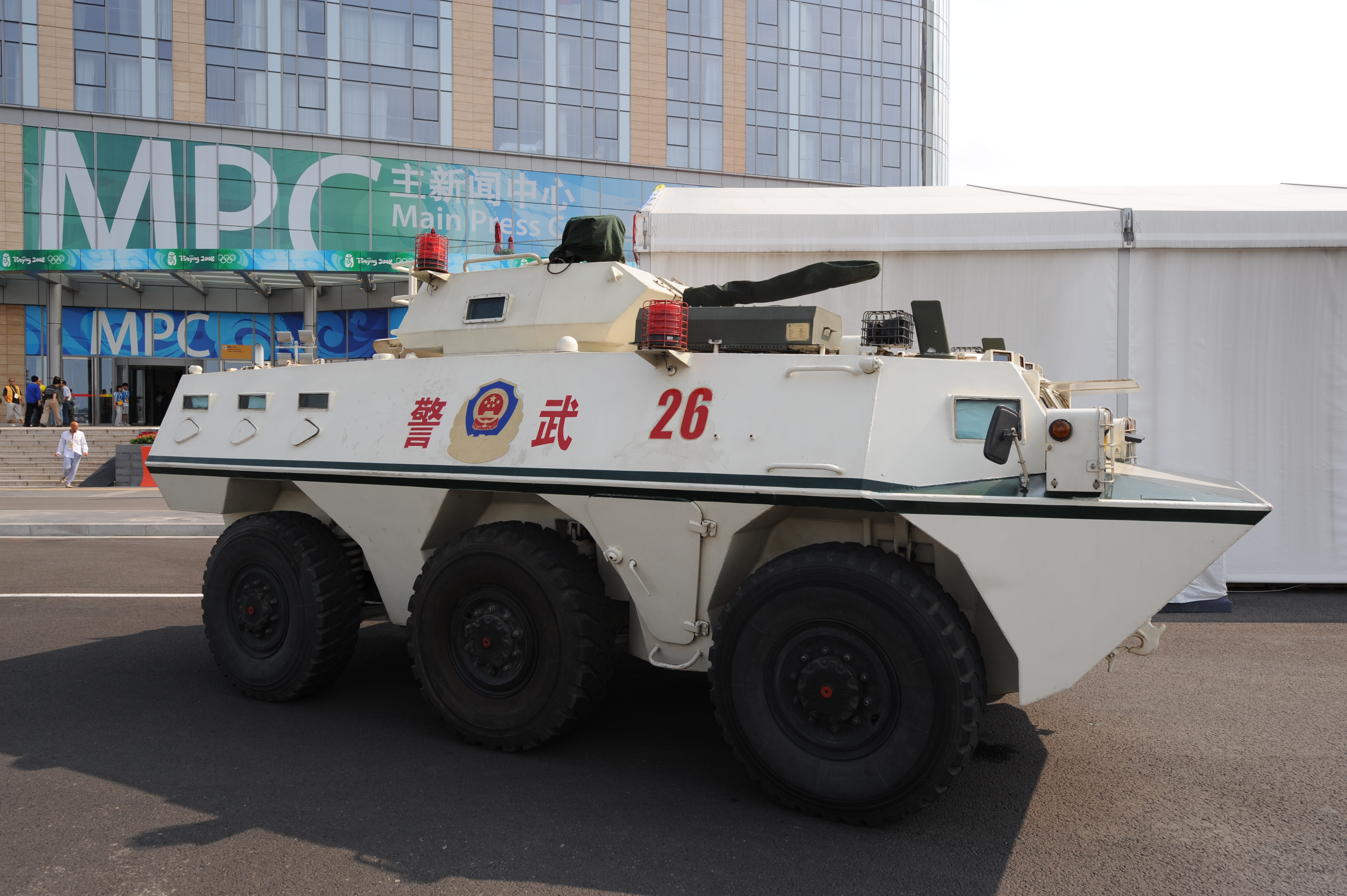
WZ-551 armored personnel carrier

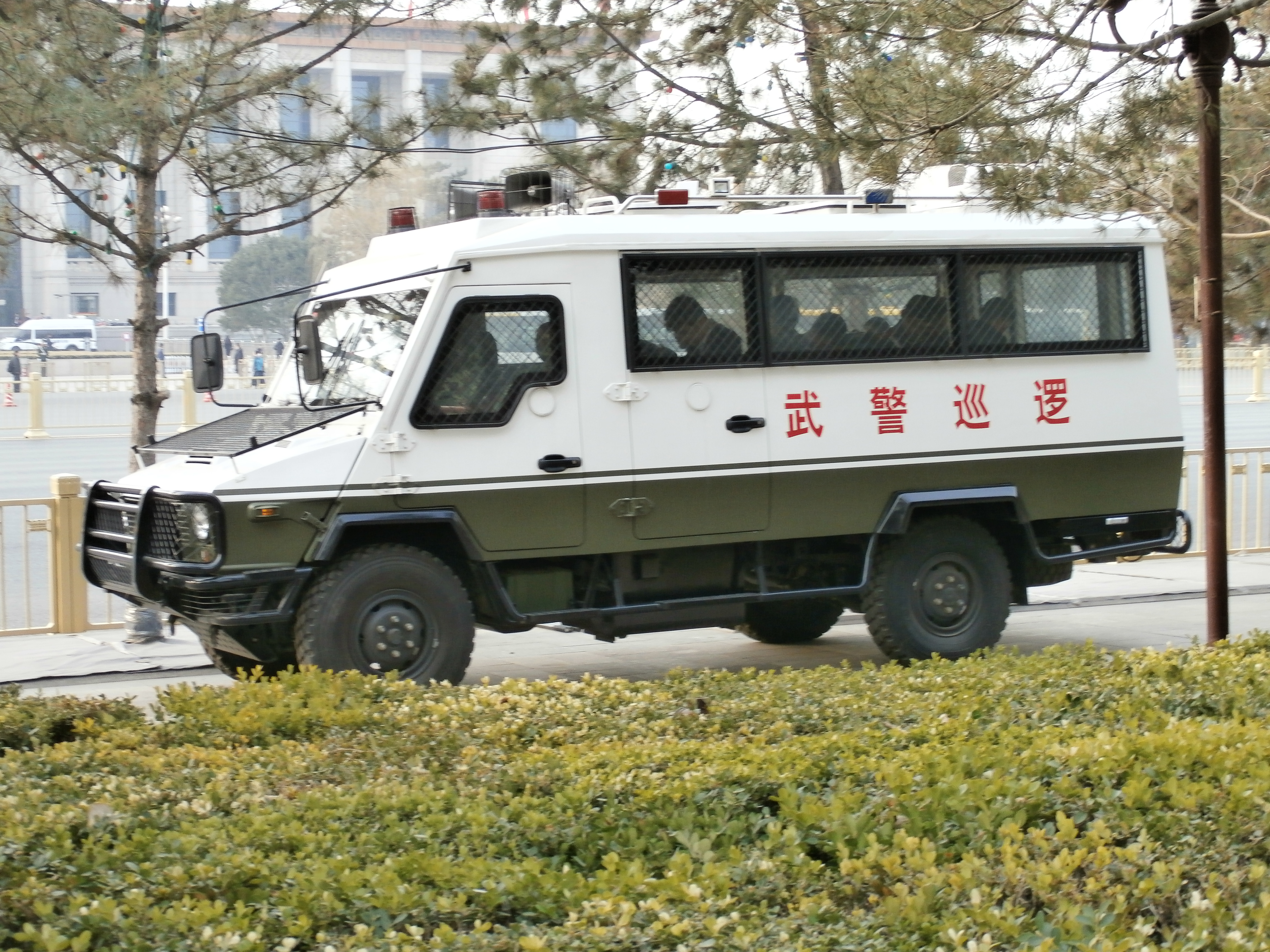
Beijing Corps NJ2045 patrol van near Tiananmen, Beijing

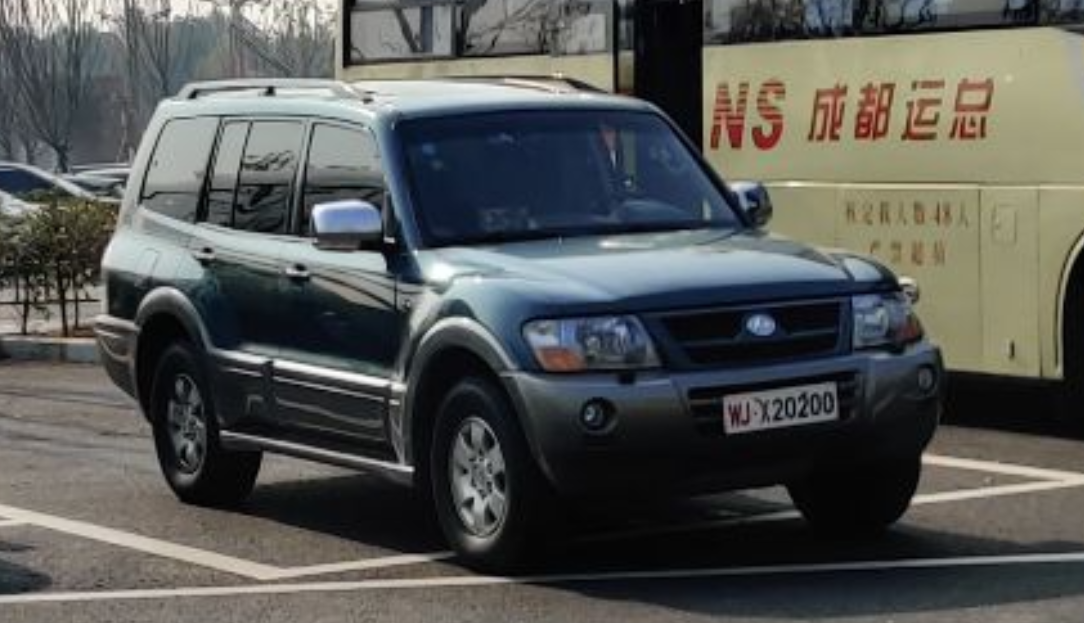
An unmarked Sichuan Corps Mitsubishi Pajero in the Sanxingdui Museum parking lot.

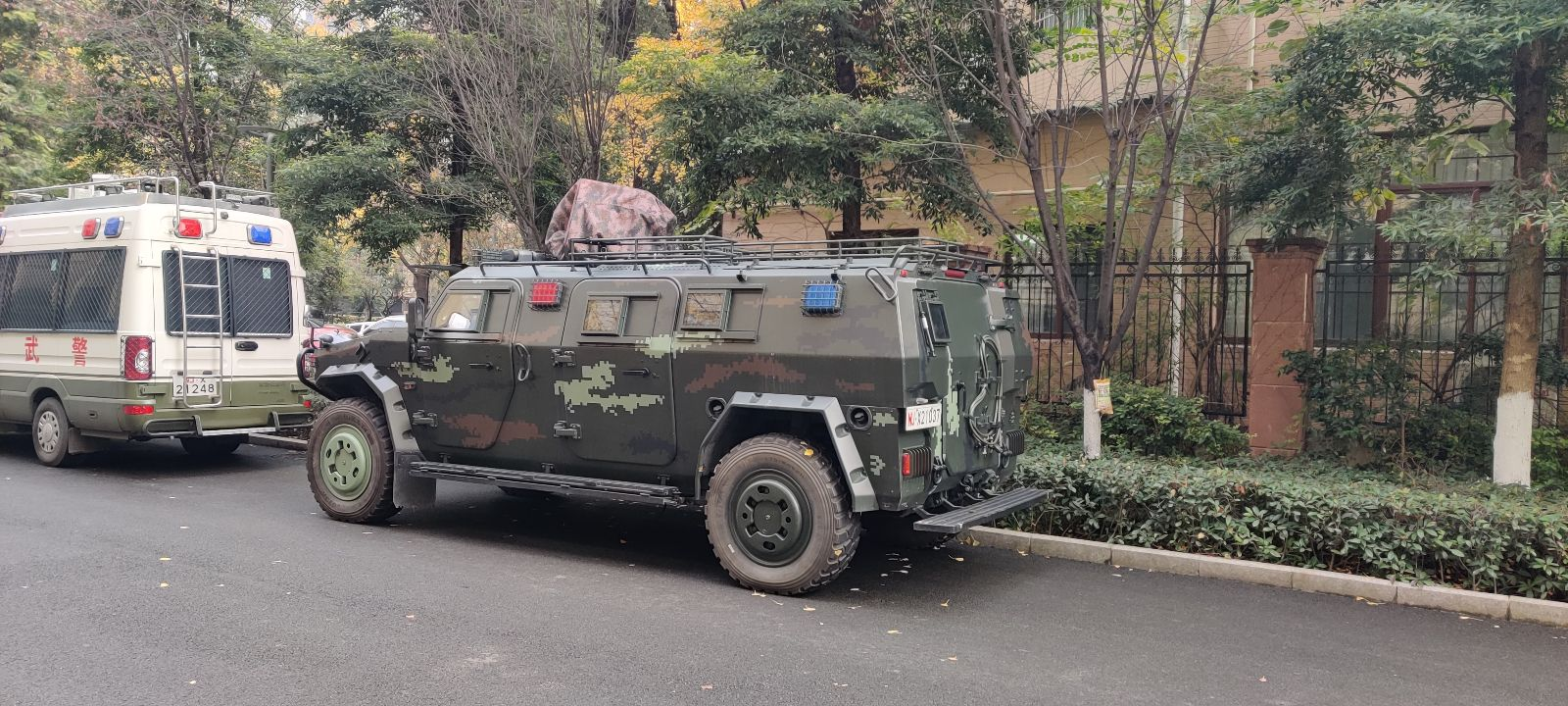
A Sichuan Corps CSK-181 near Sichuan Science and Technology Museum

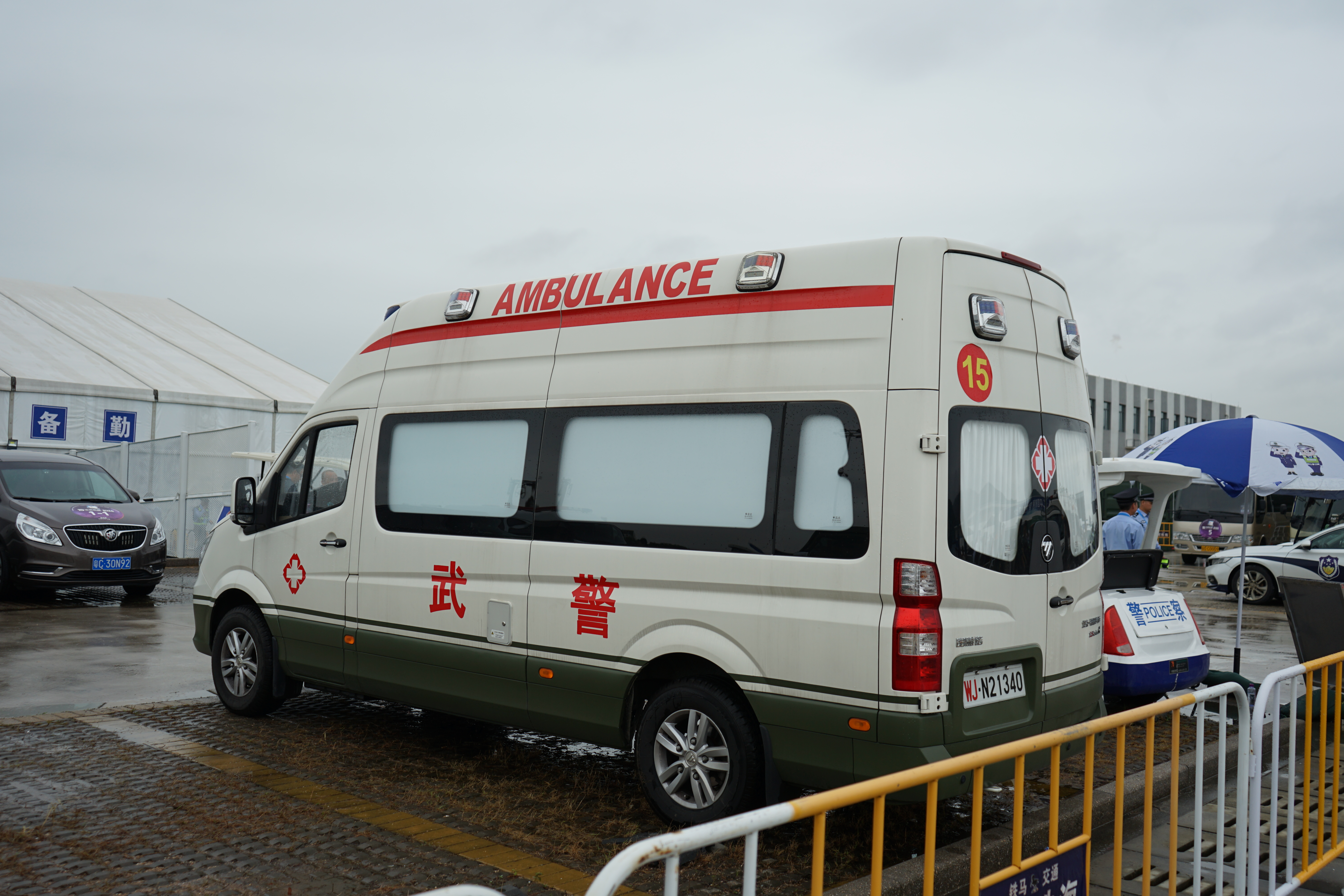
Guangdong Corps Foton Toano Ambulance

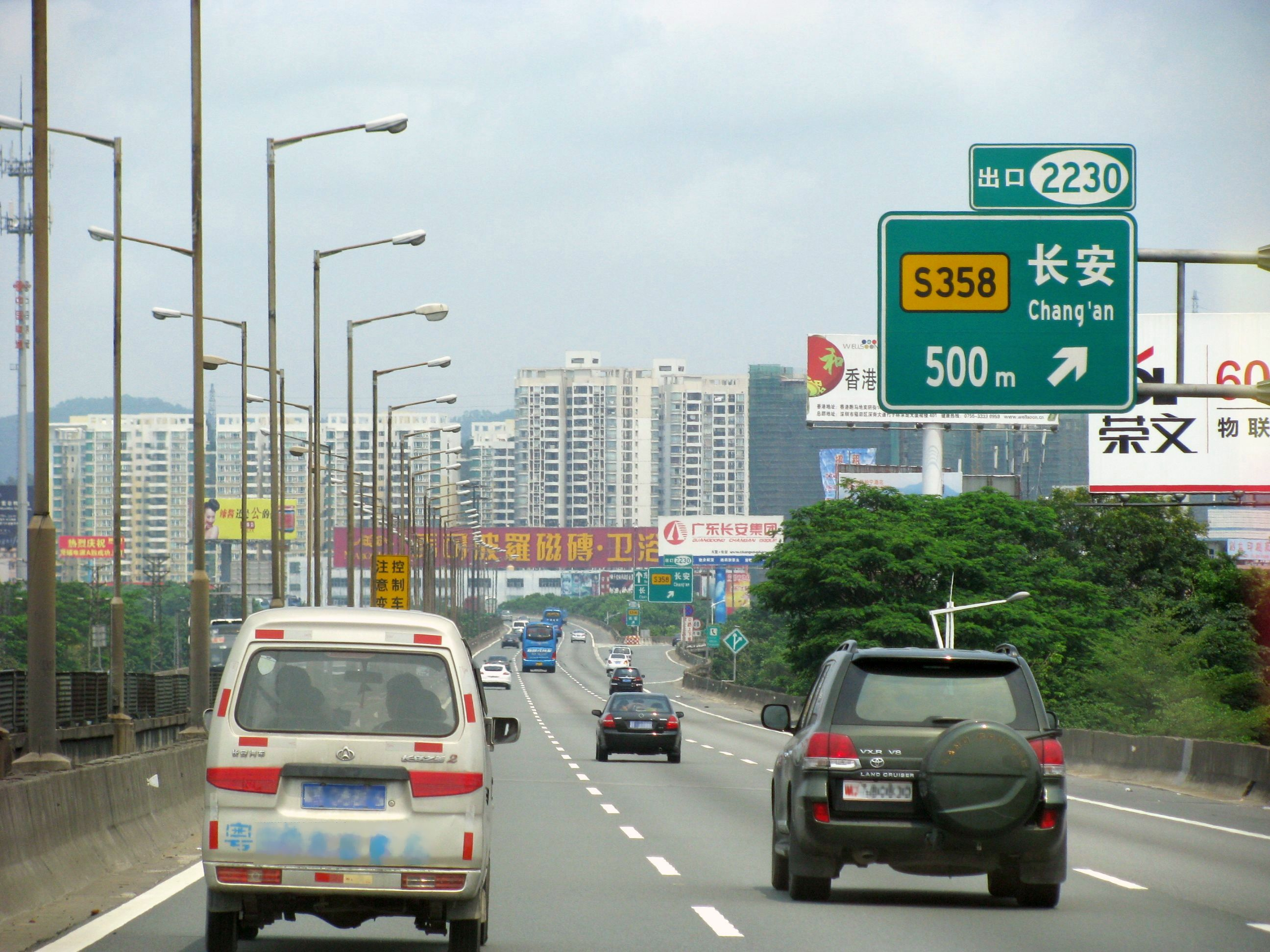
Guangdong Corps unmarked Toyota Land Cruiser (right)

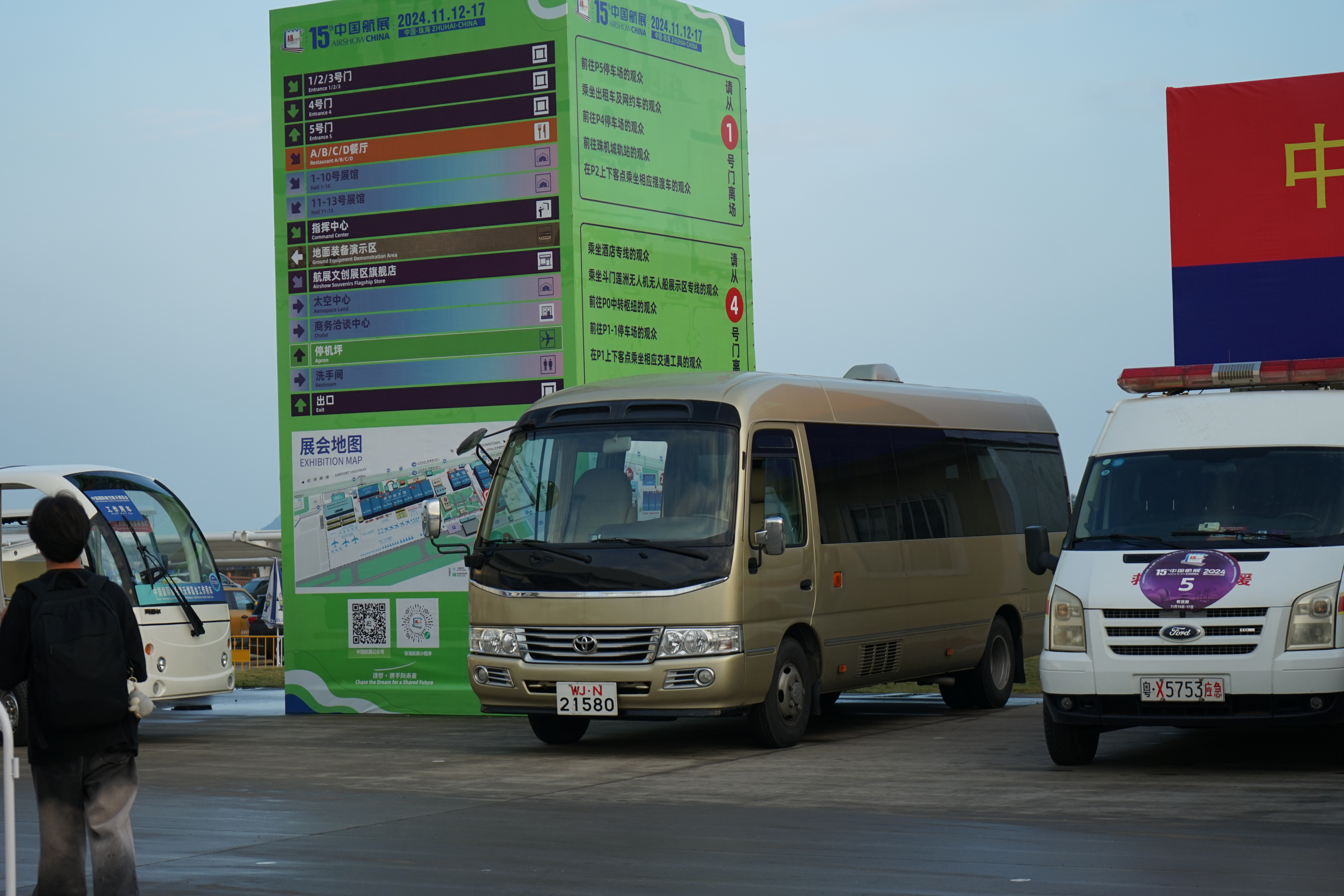
Guangdong Corps unmarked Toyota Coaster

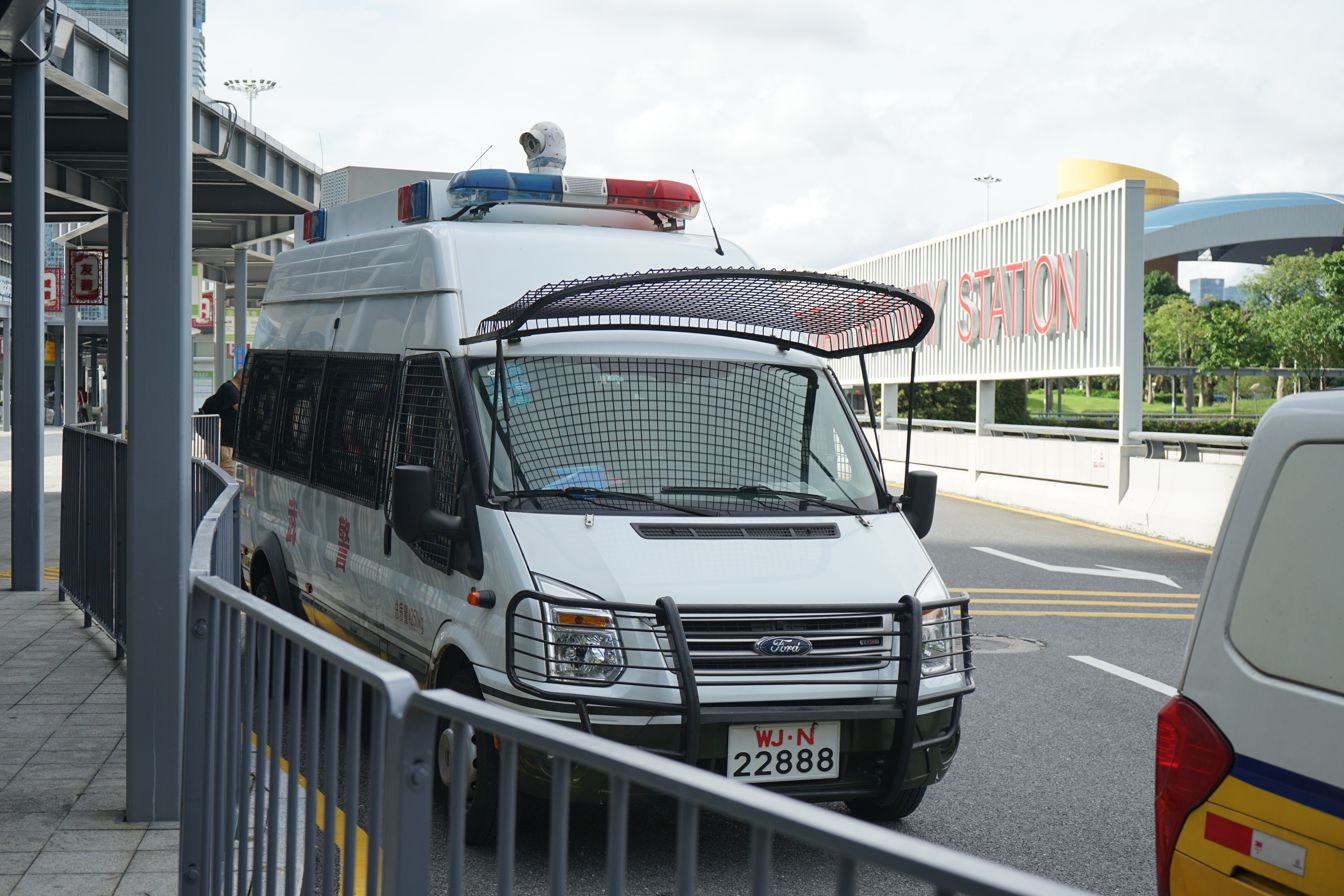
Guangdong Corps Ford Transit

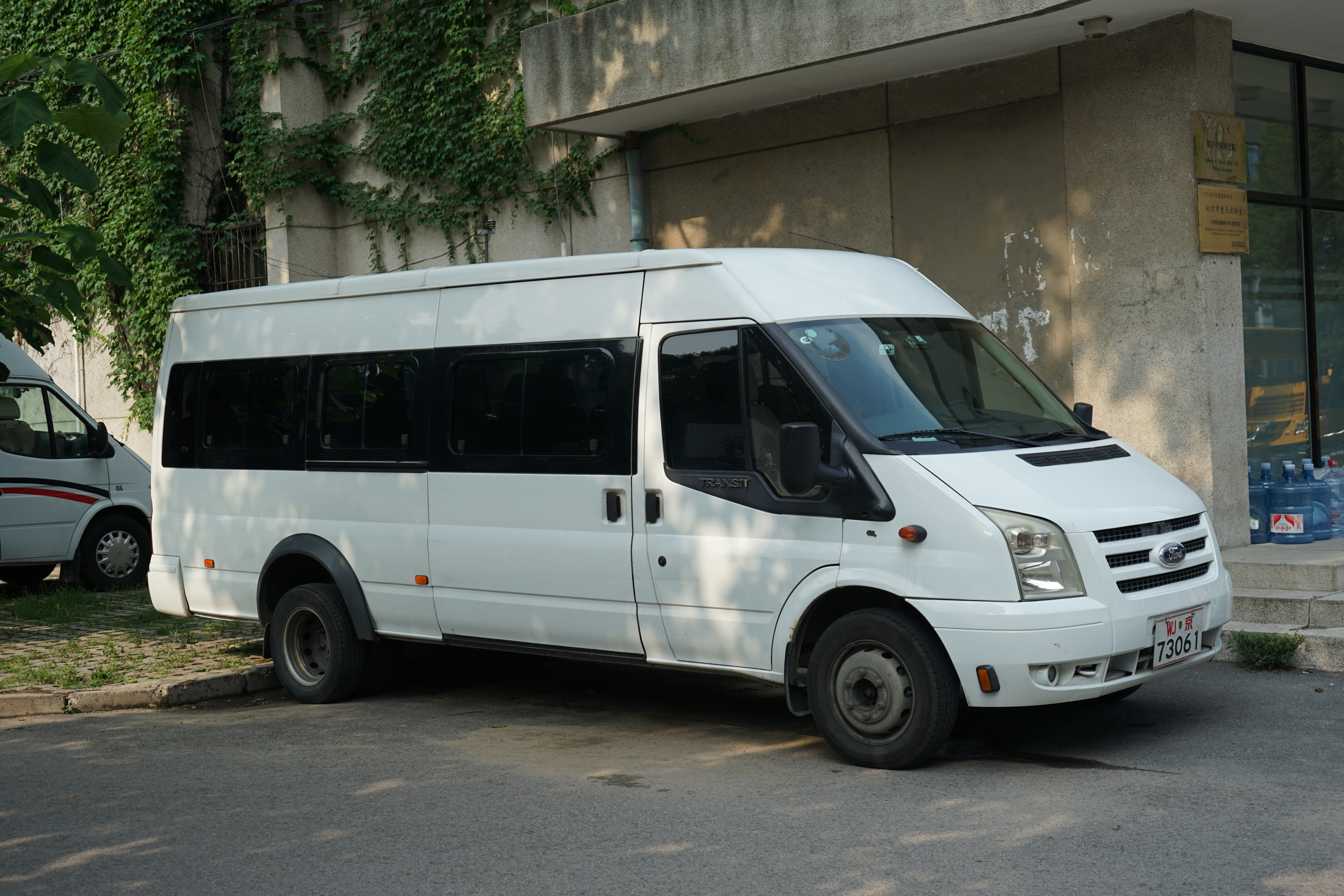
Beijing Corps unmarked Ford Transit

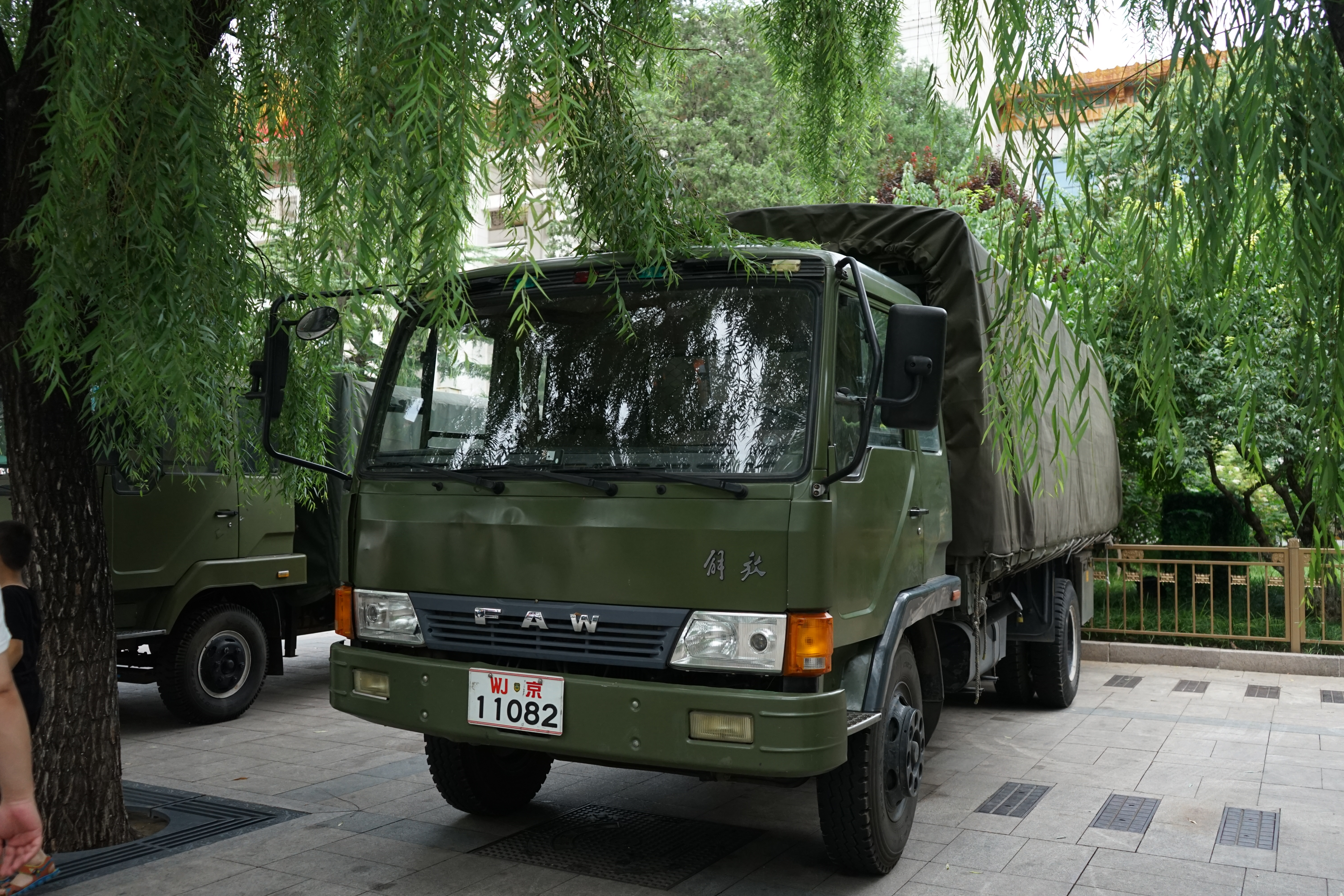
Beijing Corps FAW Jiefang truck

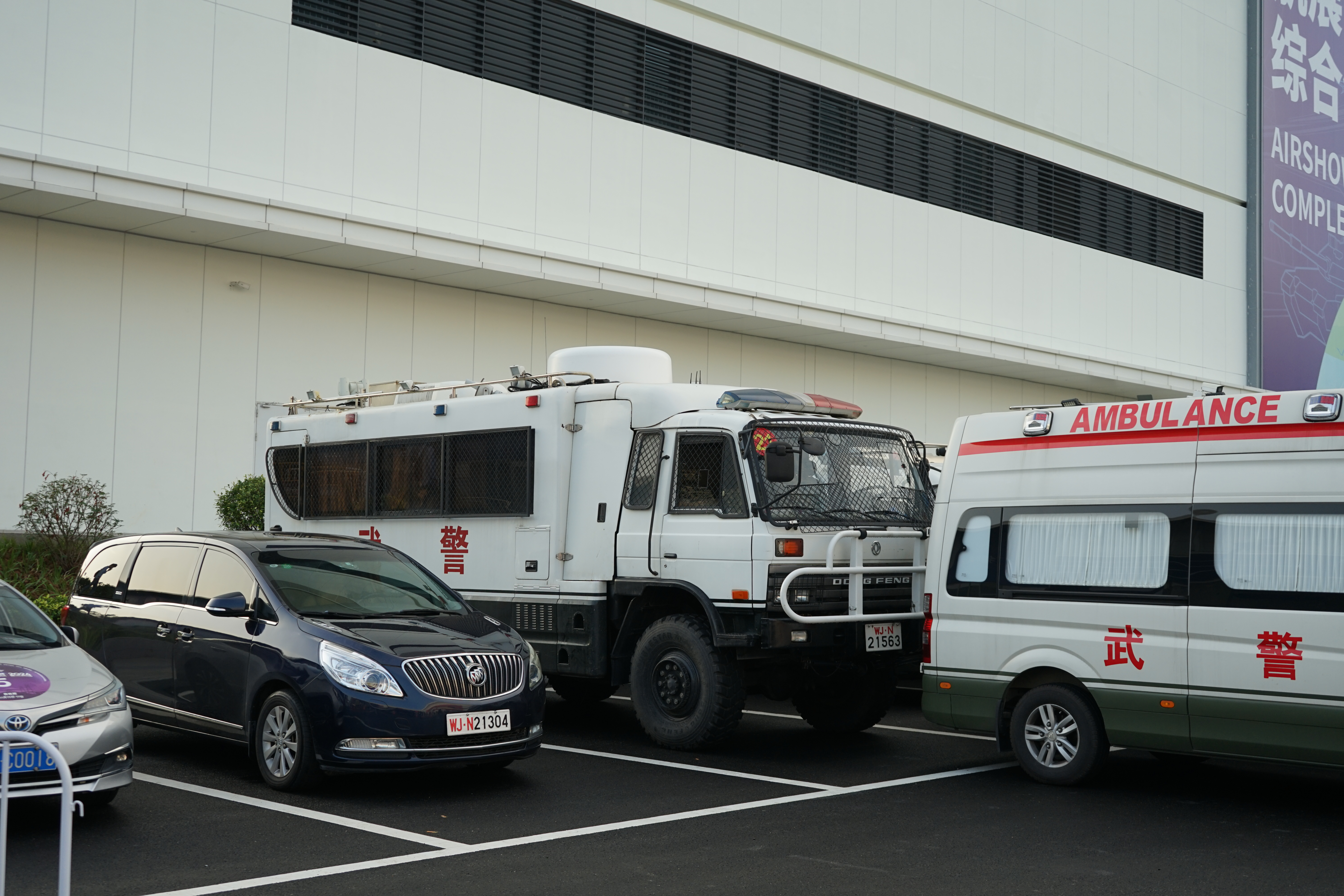
Guangdong Corps Dongfeng EQ2102

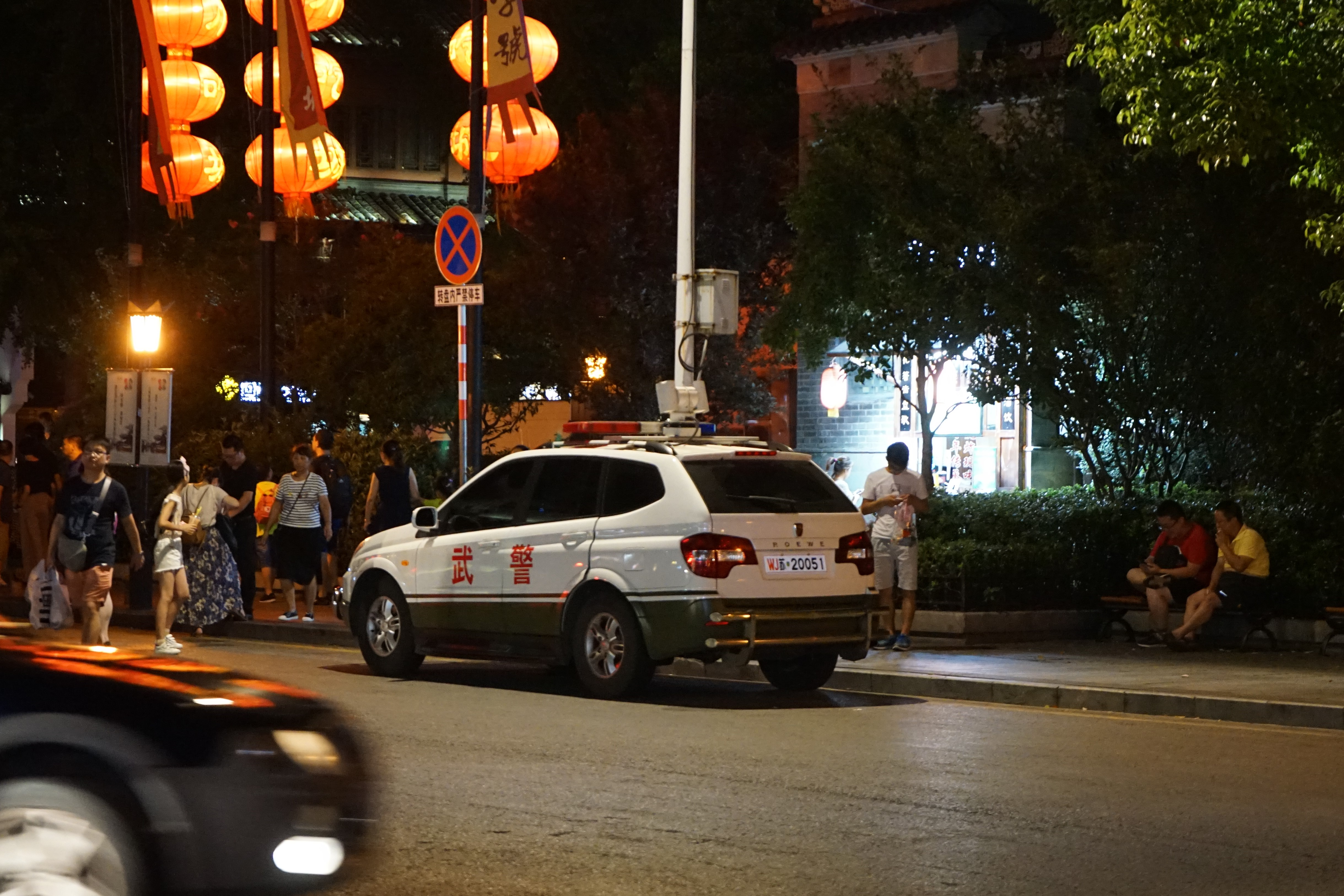
Jiangsu Corps Roewe W5

=== Retired Equipment ===
==== Helicopters ====
- Avicopter AC313 - used by People's Armed Police Forestry Corps - transferred to China Fire and Rescue when the Forestry Corps was disbanded and transferred to the China Fire and Rescue; 10 ordered

==== Vehicles ====
- YD801 firefighting vehicle- Seen in use with defunct People's Armed Police Forestry Corps
- All terrain vehicle - seen in use with defunct People's Armed Police Forestry Corps
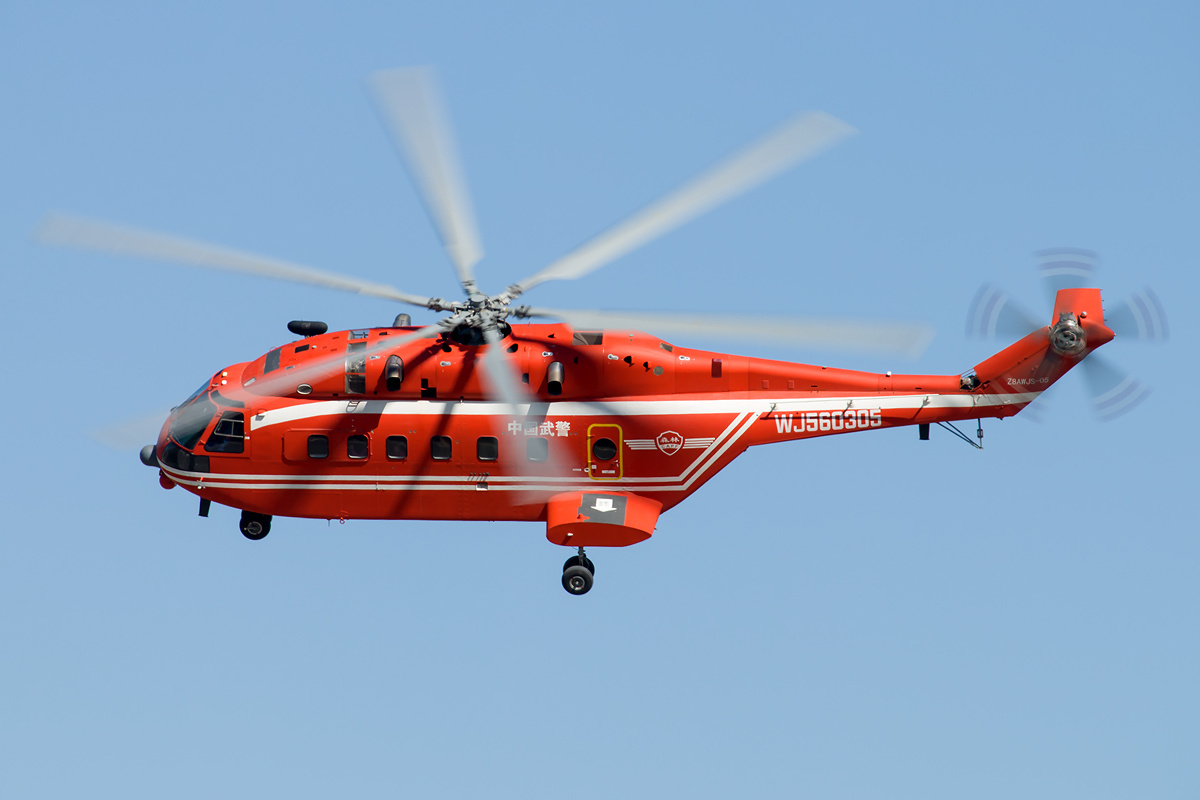
Forestry Corps Changhe Z-8WJS

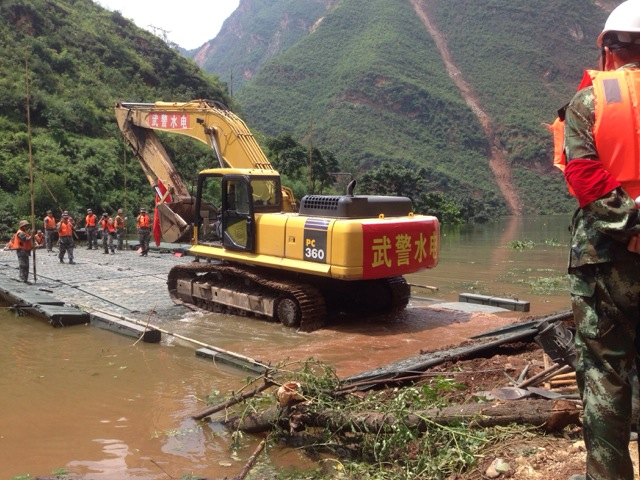
Hydropower corps Excavators providing aid after the 2014 Ludian earthquake

== Ranks and insignia ==
Due to its history with the PLA, the PAP has a similar rank structure to the PLA and also obeys its regulations. PAP guards are also recruited at the same time and through the same procedures as PLA soldiers. However, the PAP has its own education and training system separate from the PLA. Like the PLA, the PAP also celebrates Army Day on August 1 of every year, and enjoys the same services as the PLA.

=== Officers ===
Title	武警上将 Wǔjǐng shàng jiàng	武警中将 Wǔjǐng zhōng jiàng	武警少将 Wǔjǐng shàojiàng	武警大校 Wǔjǐng dàxiào	武警上校 Wǔjǐng shàngxiào	武警中校 Wǔjǐng zhong xiao	武警少校 Wǔjǐng shàoxiào	武警上尉 Wǔjǐng shàngwèi	武警中尉 Wǔjǐng zhōngwèi	武警少尉 Wǔjǐng shàowèi	武警学员 Wǔjǐng xuéyuán
Equivalent Translation	General	Lieutenant general	Major general	Senior colonel	Colonel	Lieutenant colonel	Major	Captain	1st lieutenant	2nd lieutenant	Officer cadet
Shoulder Insignia											
Collar Insignia											

=== Non-commissioned officers and enlisted ===
Title	武警一级警士长 Wǔjǐng yī jí jǐng shì zhǎng	武警二级警士长 Wǔjǐng èr jí jǐng shì zhǎng	武警三级警士长 Wǔjǐng sān jí jǐng shì zhǎng	武警一级上士 Wǔjǐng yī jí shàng shì	武警二级上士 Wǔjǐng èr jí shàng shì	武警中士 Wǔjǐng zhōng shì	武警下士 Wǔjǐng xiàshì	武警上等兵 Wǔjǐng shàngděngbīng	武警列兵 Wǔjǐng lièbīng
Equivalent translation	Master Sergeant 1st class	Master Sergeant 2nd class	Master Sergeant 3rd class	Staff sergeant 1st Class	Staff sergeant 2nd Class	Sergeant	Corporal	Private 1st class	Private
Shoulder Insignia									
Collar Insignia									

== See also ==
- Gendarmerie
- Republic of China (Taiwan) Military Police
- Central Armed Police Forces
