= Foton Toano =

Van built by Foton of Beijing, China

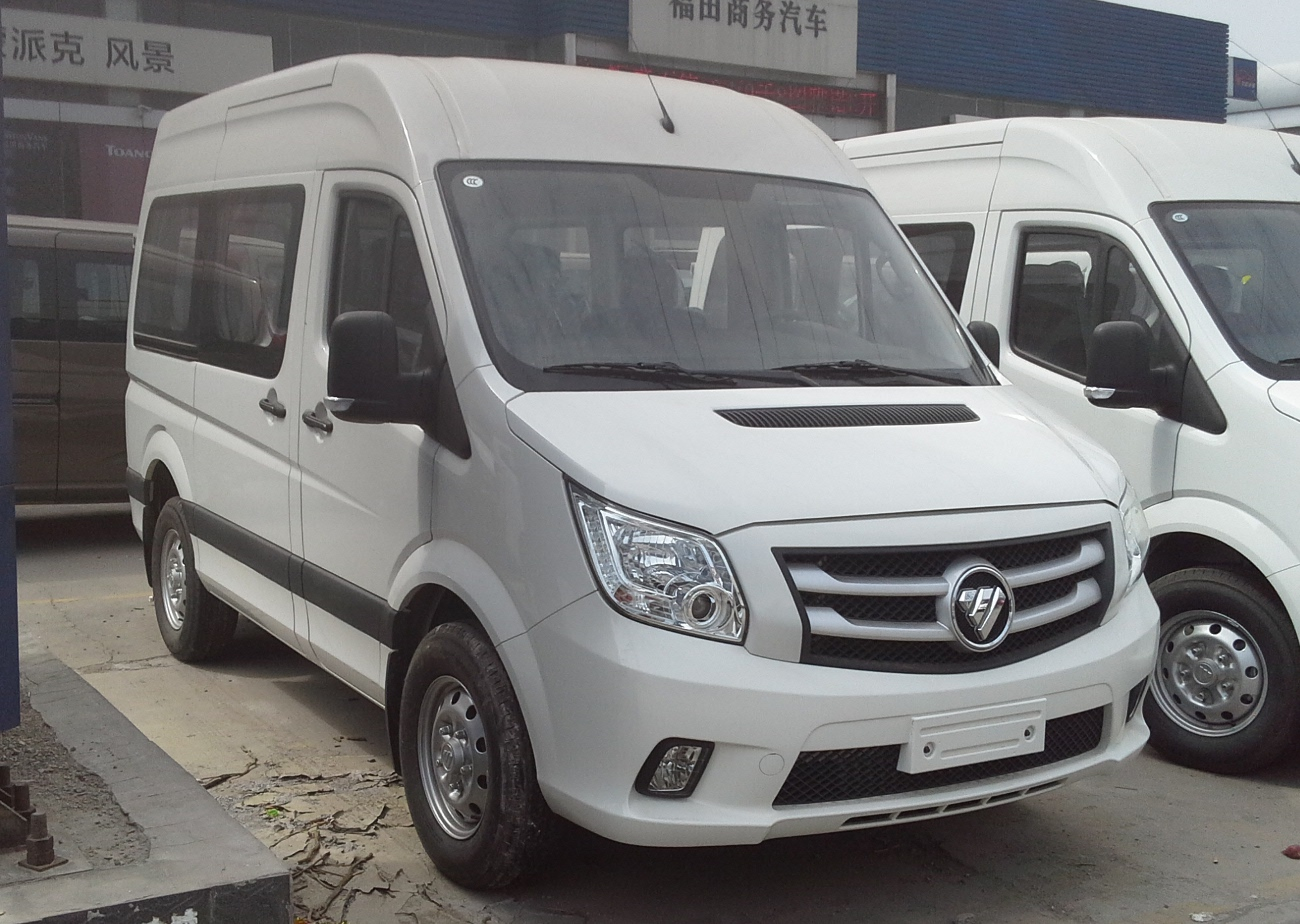

Overview
- Also called: Foton Tuyano V (EV)
- Production: 2015–present
- Assembly: Weifang, Shandong (eifang Hi-tech); Clark, Pampanga, Philippines (Foton Motors Philippines)

Body and chassis
- Body style: 4-door minibus
- Layout: ICE; Front-engine, front-wheel-drive; Front-engine, rear-wheel-drive; Hybrid; EV; Front-motor, FWD; Rear-motor, RWD; Dual-motors, 4WD

Powertrain
- Engine: gasoline; 2.0 L G01 Turbo I4; diesel; 2.5 L Futian 4J25TC3 turbo I4; 2.8L Cummins ISF turbo I4
- Power output: 204 PS (201 hp; 150 kW) (2.0 Turbo); 110 PS (108 hp; 81 kW) (2.5 Diesel / 2.8 turbodiesel); 150 PS (148 hp; 110 kW) (2.8 Turbodiesel)
- Transmission: 5-speed manual 6-speed manual
- Range: Maximum 500 km (EV)

Dimensions
- Wheelbase: 2,933–3,750 mm (115.5–147.6 in)
- Length: 5,015–5,990 mm (197.4–235.8 in)
- Width: 2,000 mm (78.7 in)
- Height: 2,415–2,430 mm (95.1–95.7 in)

The Foton Toano (Chinese: 图雅诺) is a light commercial vehicle (van) built by Foton of Beijing, China as a van, chassis cab, and minibus.

== Overview ==
The Foton Toano was produced by Chinese car manufacturer Foton since 2015, and the styling is controversial as the exterior design heavily resembles the Mercedes-Benz Sprinter van.

The Foton Toano is equipped with a 2.8 liter ISF Cummins CRDI turbo diesel engine, which generates 120 kW (160 hp) and 360 N⋅m (266 lb⋅ft) of torque. The Toano is also Euro IV compliant.

It can accommodate 15 passengers with a high ceiling, making it possible to stand up inside the vehicle.

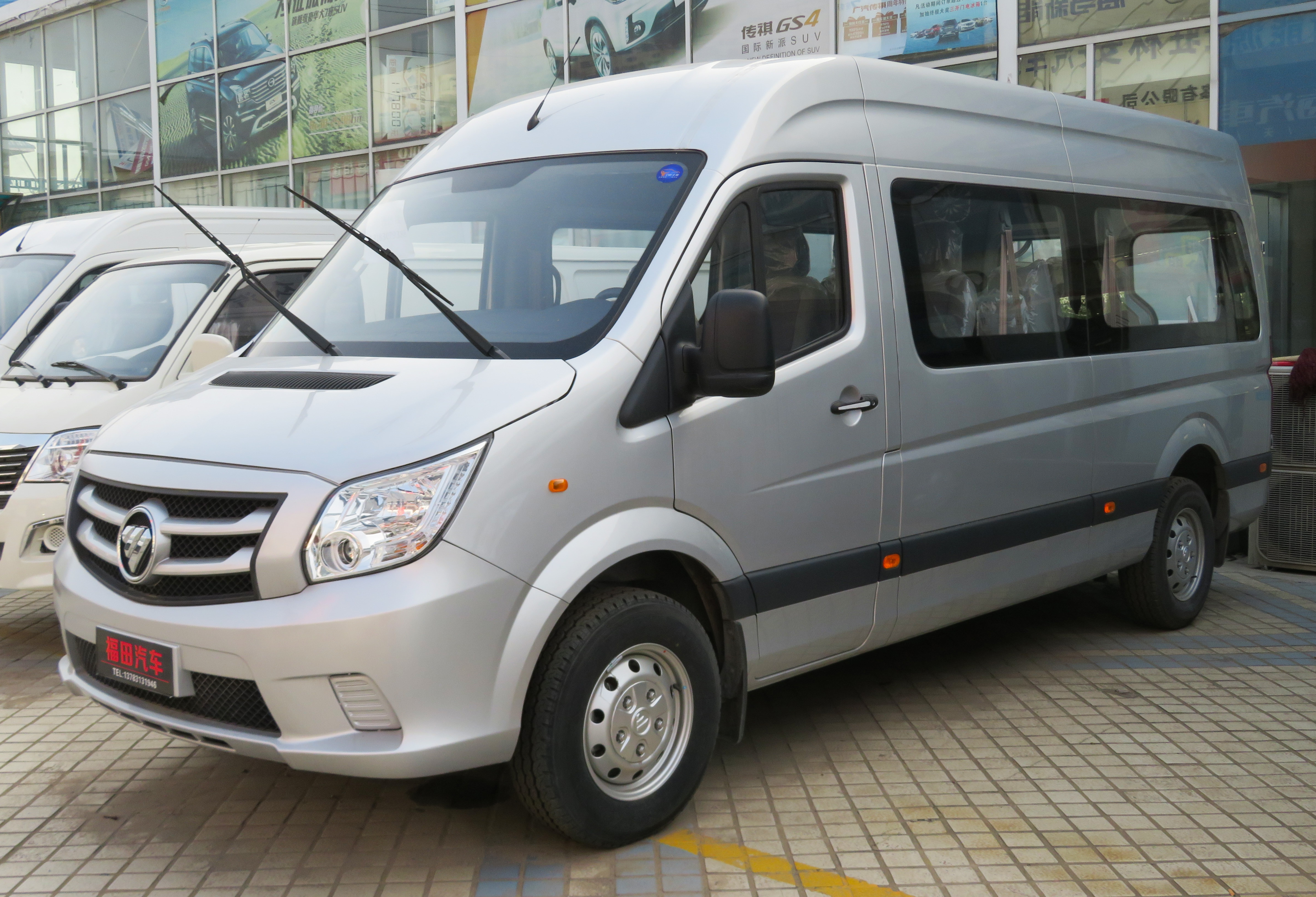
Foton Toano S (long wheelbase)

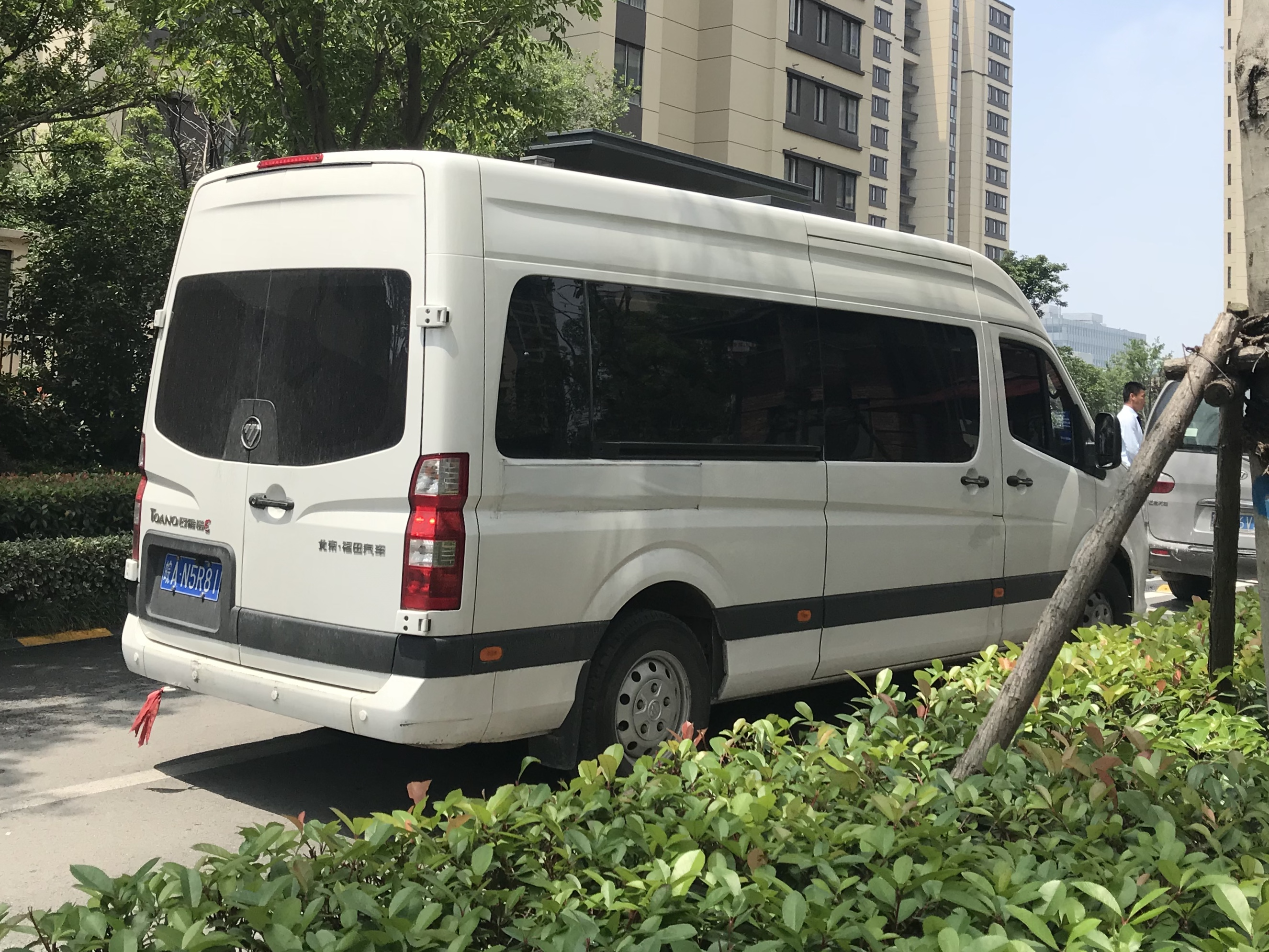
Foton Toano S rear (long wheelbase)

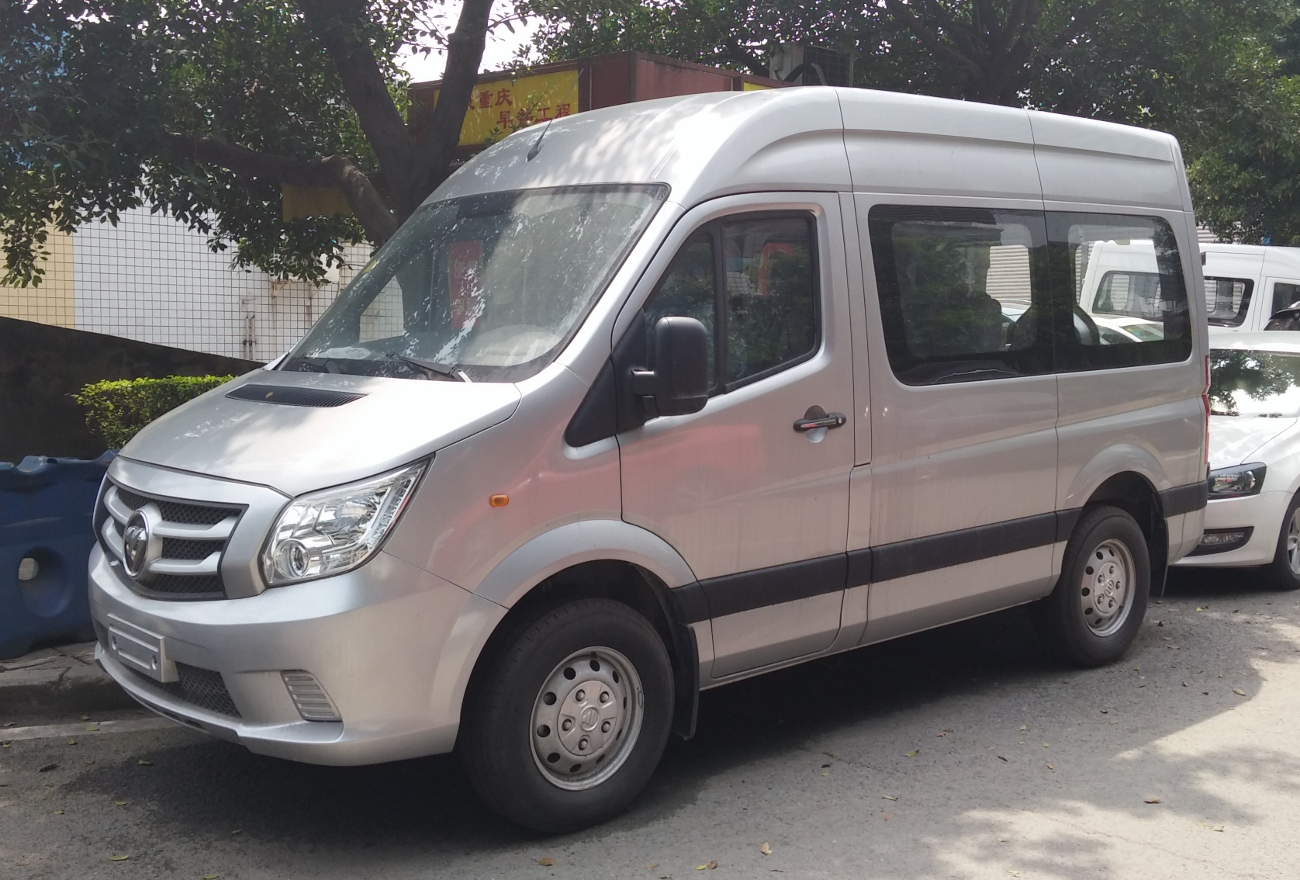
Foton Toano E (short wheelbase)

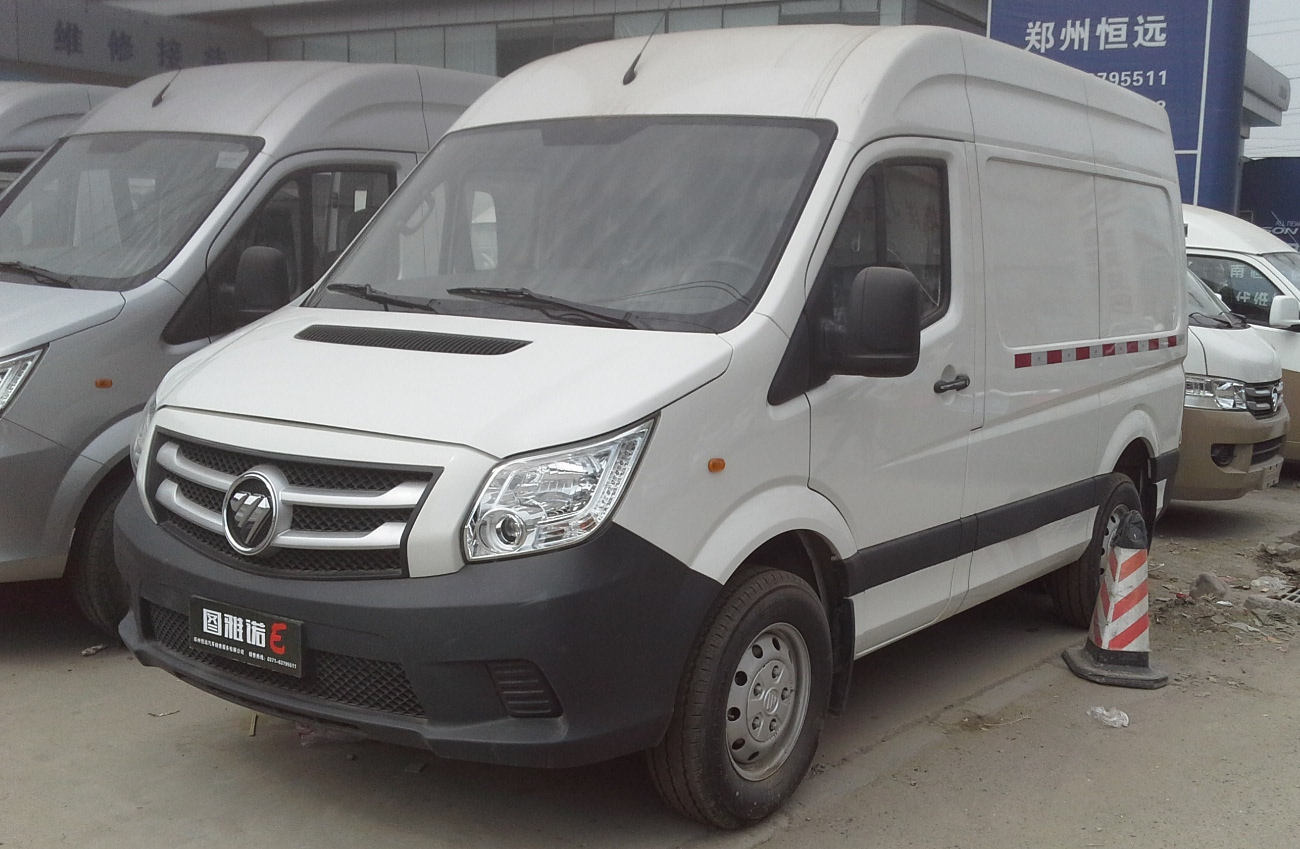
Foton Toano E panel van

=== 2024 facelift (Pro/ X7/ X8) ===
The Foton Toano received a facelift for the 2024 model year. Sold as the Toano Pro, the update introduces refined styling to the front bumper and new headlamp design, improved interior features, and updated powertrain options, including a 2.5 liter diesel engine. The updated model was reintroduced in April 2025 as the Toano X7 and Toano X8 variants. The X7 is designed for logistics, while the X8 is the name for passenger models.

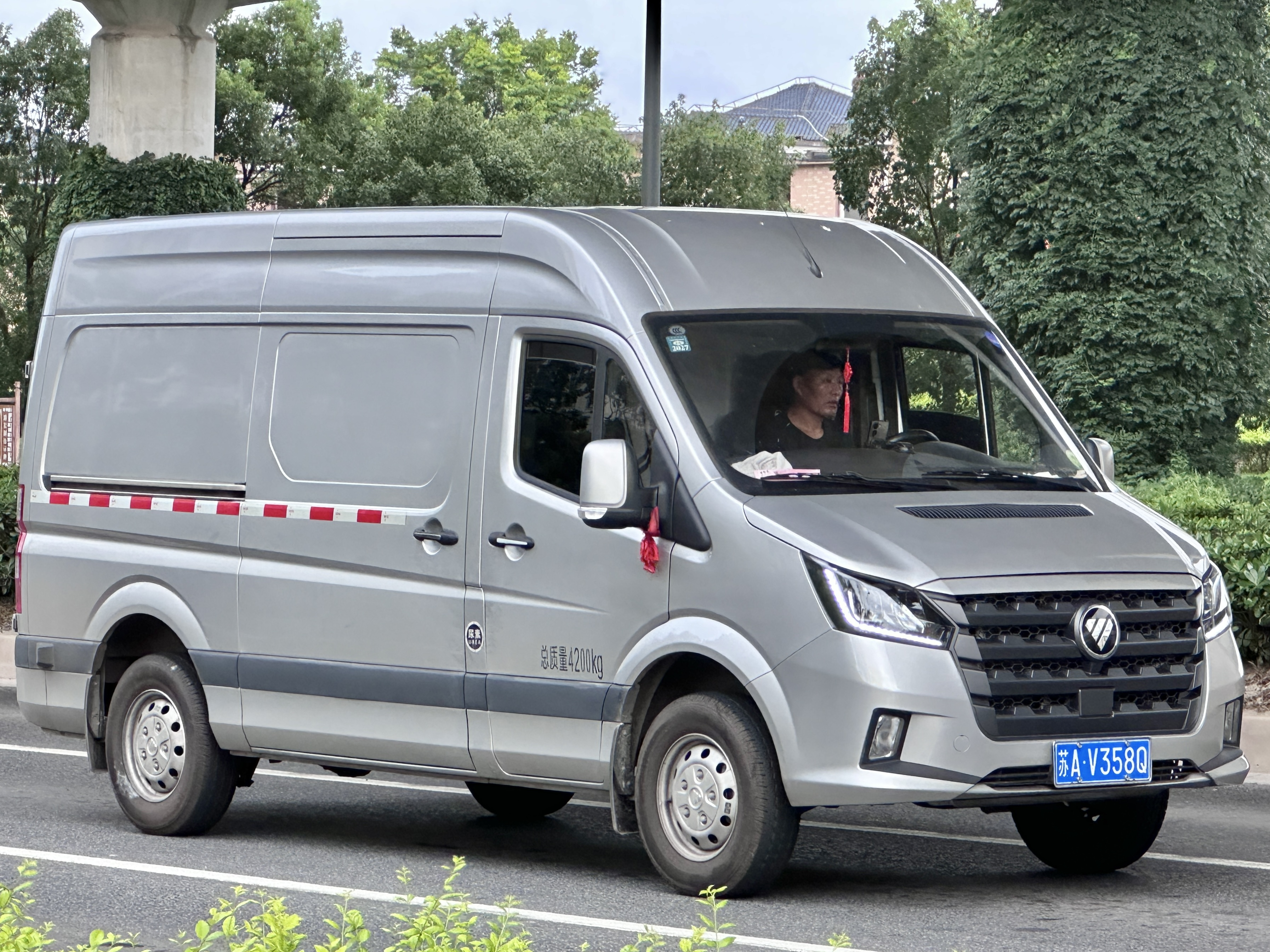
Foton Toano X7 (2025)

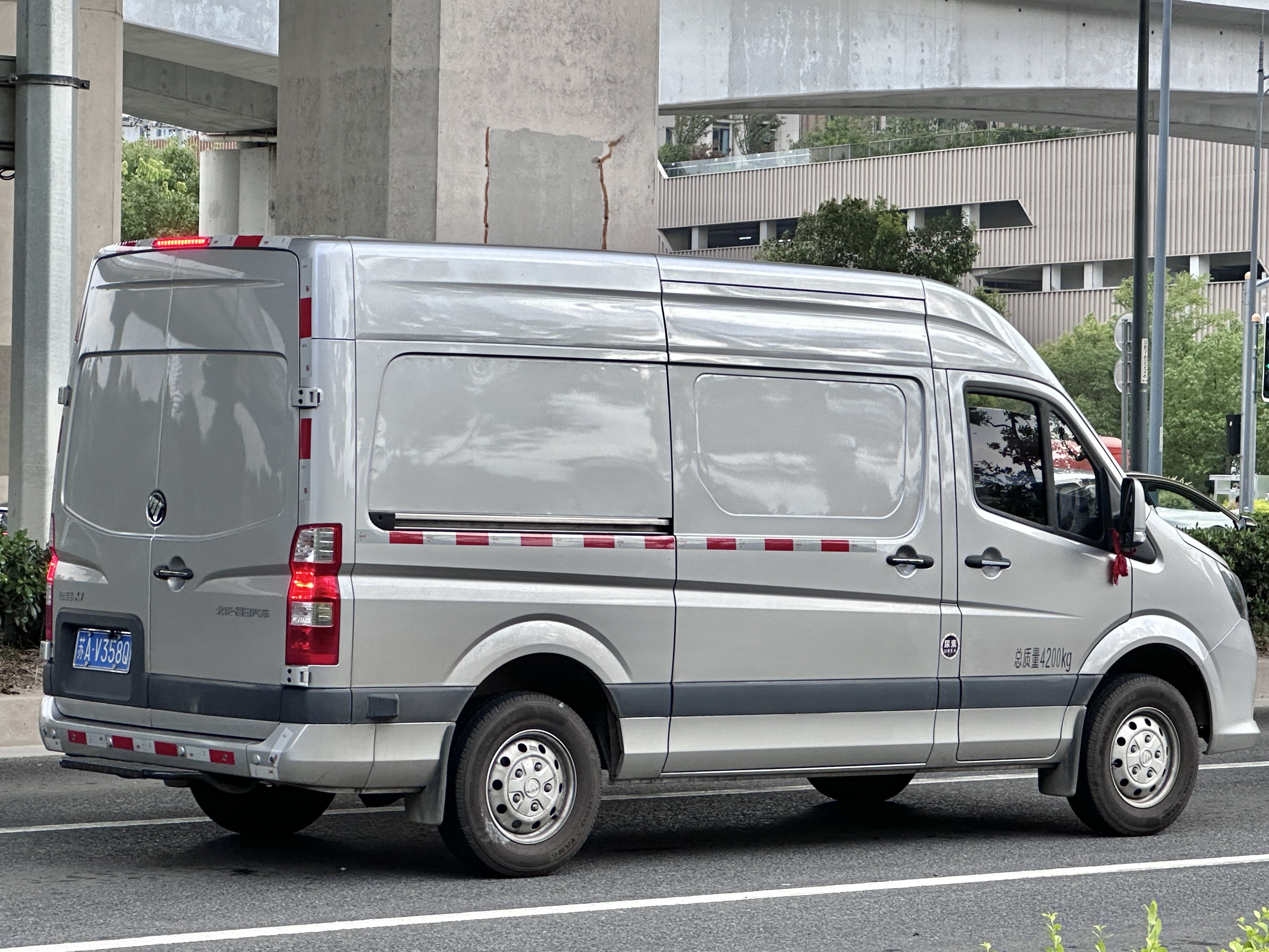
Rear
