= PLA Beijing Garrison =

Chinese military command region

Beijing Garrison
- 中国人民解放军北京卫戍区
- Beijing Garrison Map (China)
- Founded: 1 February 2016; 10 years ago
- Country: People's Republic of China
- Allegiance: Chinese Communist Party
- Type: Theater Command
- Role: Command and control
- Part of: People's Liberation Army
- Headquarters: Haidian, Beijing

Commanders
- Commander: Major General Chen Yuan
- Political Commissar: Major General Zhu Jun
- Chief of Staff: Senior Colonel

The Beijing Garrison District is a military district of corps grade (正军级) under the direct jurisdiction of the People's Liberation Army Headquarters and the Central Military Commission. The Garrison is responsible for the defense of the city of Beijing, the protection of all the state institutions in the capital, military mobilization in case of war, and civilian-military relations.

== History ==
The Beijing Garrison District was created from the old Beijing Military Region in August of 2016, as part of the 2015 reforms. Due to the importance of the capital, and the sensitivity of its military affairs, the garrison was given its own military district, distinct to the Central Theater Command, and was placed directly under the control of the Central Military Commission.

Another peculiarity, only shared with the Xinjiang Military District, is that Beijing units preserved their traditional division/regiment structure rather than become brigades as elsewhere in the PLA. Its current leaders are commander Chen Yuan and political commissar Zhu Jun.

== Subordinate Units ==
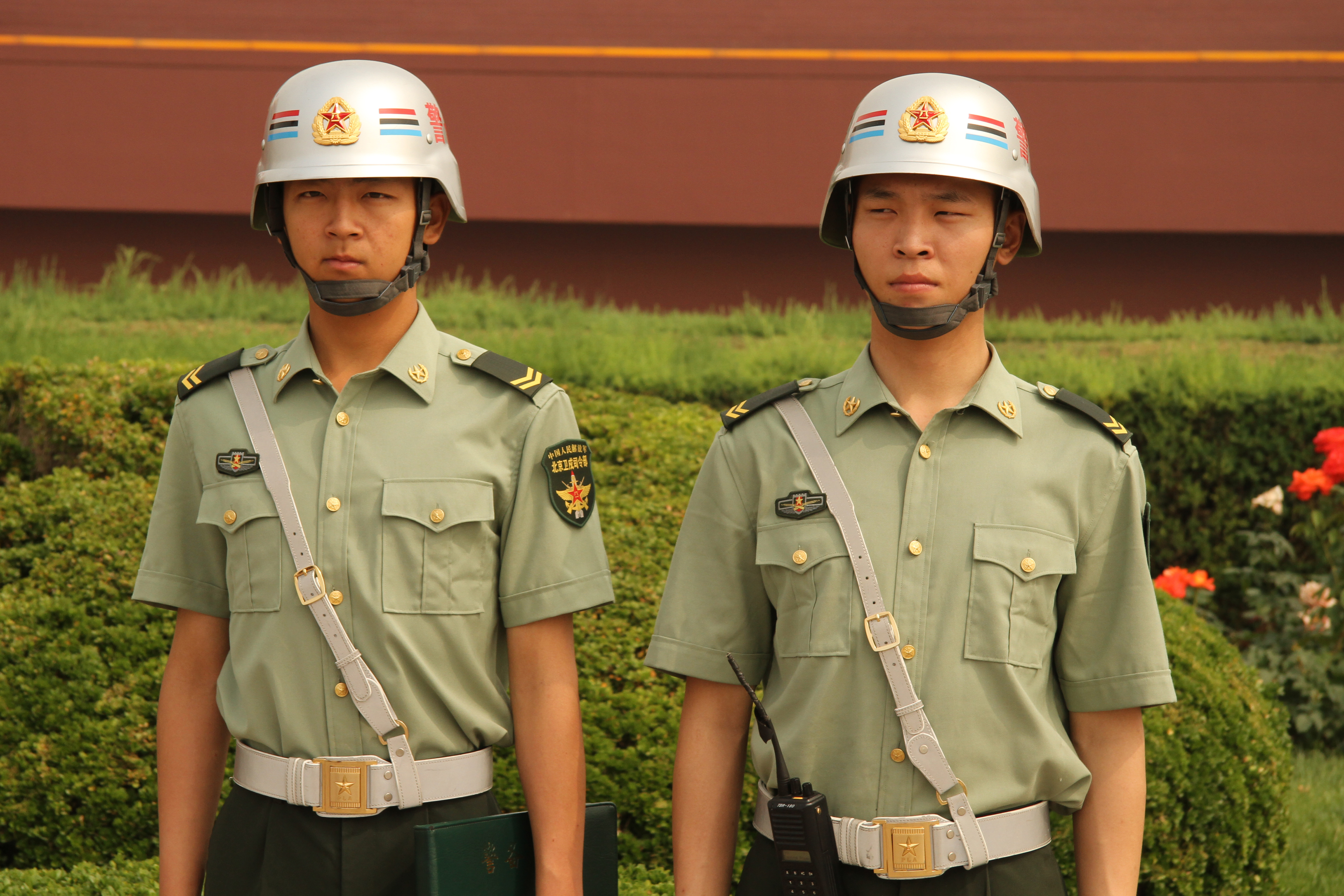
Two garrison MPs at Tiananmen Square

As of 2022, the Beijing Garrison District controlled the following units:
- PLA Beijing Garrison
  - 17th Guards Regiment (警卫第十七团)
  - 1st Guards Division (警卫第一师) Stationed at Fuxing Road, Haidian District
    - 3rd Guards Regiment (警卫第三团)
    - 4th Guards Regiment (警卫第四团)
    - 5th Guards Regiment (警卫第五团)
    - 6th Guards Regiment (警卫第六团)
    - Beijing Garrison Honor Guard Battalion (仪仗大队)
  - 3rd Guard Division (警卫第三师), stationed in Tongzhou District
    - 11th Guards Regiment "Tigers" (警卫第十一团)
    - 13th Guards Regiment (警卫第十三团)
    - 14th Guards Regiment (警卫第十四团)
    - 15th Guards Regiment (警卫第十五团)
    - Artillery Regiment (炮兵团)
    - Anti-Aircraft Regiment (高炮团)
    - Support Regiment (支援保障团)

== Leaders ==
Commanders
English name	Chinese name	Took office	Left office	Notes
Zheng Chuanfu	郑传福	December 2009	December 2013	
Pan Liangshi	潘良时	December 2013	July 2016	
Wang Chunning	王春宁	July 2016	April 2020	
Fu Wenhua	付文化	April 2020	March 2024	
Chen Yuan	陳源	January 2026	Incumbent	

Political Commissars
English name	Chinese name	Took office	Left office	Notes
Gao Donglu	高东璐	December 2009	December 2014	
Jiang Yong	姜勇	December 2014	December 2019	
Zhang Fandi	张凡迪	December 2019	October 2023	
Zhu Jun	朱军	June 2024	Incumbent	
