= He Lei =

Chinese general

- 何雷

Vice-President of the PLA Academy of Military Science
- In office December 2013 – October 2018
- President: Liu Chengjun→Gao Jin→Cai Yingting→Zheng He→Yang Xuejun

Deputy Commander of the Lanzhou Military Region
- In office July 2013 – December 2013
- Leader: Liu Yuejun (commander)

Personal details
- Born: June 1955 (age 71) Luoyang, Henan, China
- Party: Chinese Communist Party
- Education: PLA National Defence University; Central Party School of the Chinese Communist Party

Military service
- Allegiance: People's Republic of China
- Branch/service: People's Liberation Army Ground Force
- Years of service: 1968-present
- Rank: Lieutenant general
- Unit: 38th Group Army
- Commands: Lanzhou Military Region

He Lei (Chinese: 何雷; pinyin: Hé Léi; born June 1955) is a lieutenant general of the Chinese People's Liberation Army.

== Biography ==
He was born in Luoyang, Henan, in June 1955, to a military family, while his ancestral home in Tongjiang County, Sichuan Province. He enlisted in the People's Liberation Army in 1968, when he served in the military in Beijing Military Region. At the end of 1990, he was transferred to the PLA Academy of Military Science, the PLA's highest-level research institute and center of military science. In July 2013 he was appointed deputy commander of the Lanzhou Military Region. Five months later, he became vice-president of the PLA Academy of Military Science.

He was promoted to the rank of major general (shaojiang) in July 2009 and lieutenant general (zhongjiang) in July 2014.

He was a delegate to the 13th National People's Congress and a delegate to 19th National Congress of the Chinese Communist Party.
