= Zheng Yanpo =

- 郑堰坡

Political Commissar of the Western Theater Command Ground Force
- Incumbent
- Assumed office 2024
- Commander: Yang Yi
- Preceded by: Wang Zhibin

Political Commissar of the 80th Group Army
- In office April 2020 – 2024
- Commander: Zheng Shoudong Hao Xingchen
- Preceded by: Zhu Yuwu
- Succeeded by: TBA

Personal details
- Born: 1966 (age 59–60) Tanghe County, Henan, China
- Party: Chinese Communist Party

Military service
- Allegiance: People's Republic of China
- Branch/service: People's Liberation Army Ground Force
- Years of service: ?-present
- Rank: Lieutenant General
- Unit: 20th Group Army 80th Group Army Western Theater Command Ground Force Western Theater Command

Zheng Yanpo (Chinese: 郑堰坡; born in 1966) is a lieutenant general (zhongjiang) of the People's Liberation Army (PLA). Currently he serves as the political commissar of the Western Theater Command Ground Force, replacing Wang Zhibin (Chinese: 汪志斌), in office since March 2024.

== Biography ==
Zheng Yanpo, born in Tanghe County, Henan, in 1966. On July 23, 2018, Zheng Yanpo got promoted to the rank of major general. He served as a leader of troops stationed in Weifang attending a symposium of military and local leaders. From 2020 to 2024 he served as the political commissar of the 80th Group Army. In 2024 he was became the political commissar of the Western Theater Command Ground Force and deputy political commissar of the Western Theater Command.

Military offices
Preceded by Zhu Yuwu	Political Commissar of the 80th Group Army; 2020-2024	Succeeded by TBA
Preceded by Wang Zhibin	Political Commissar of the Western Theater Command Ground Force; 2024-present	Incumbent
