= List of serving generals of China =

This is a list of serving generals of China.

== Top commanders ==
Post	Rank	Name	Photo	decorations
Vice Chairmen of the Central Military Commission	General	Zhang Youxia He Weidong		
Commander of the People's Liberation Army Air Force	General	Chang Dingqiu		
Commander of the People's Liberation Army Ground Force	General	Vacant		
Commander of the People's Liberation Army Rocket Force	General	Wang Houbin		
Commander of the People's Liberation Army Strategic Support Force	General	Ju Qiansheng		
Commander of the People's Armed Police	General	Wang Chunning		
