= He Bingyan =

Chinese military personnel

- 贺炳炎
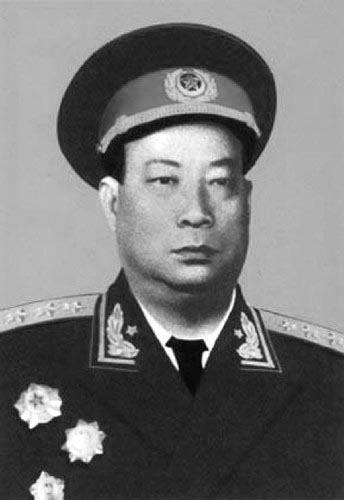

Commander of the Chengdu Military Region
- In office May 1955 – 1 July 1960
- Chairman: Mao Zedong
- Succeeded by: Huang Xinting

Personal details
- Born: 5 February 1913 Yidu, Hubei Province, China
- Died: July 1, 1960 (aged 47) Chengdu, China
- Party: Chinese Communist Party
- Awards: Order of Bayi (First Class) Order of Independence and Freedom (First Class) Order of Liberation (China) (First Class)
- Nickname: "One-armed General"

Military service
- Allegiance: China
- Branch/service: People's Liberation Army; Chinese Workers' and Peasants' Red Army
- Years of service: 1930–1922
- Rank: General
- Commands: Commander of the Shenyang Military Region
- Battles/wars: Second Sino-Japanese War, Battle of Pingxingguan, Chinese Civil War, Korean War

He Bingyan (Chinese: 贺炳炎; pinyin: Hè Bǐngyán; 5 February 1913 – 1 July 1960) was a colonel general in the People's Liberation Army of the People's Republic of China from Hubei. He was known as the "one-armed General (独臂将军)" for his injuries suffered during the Long March.

== Biography ==
=== Early life ===
He Bingyan was born into a widowed family. After his mother's death, he changed his surname from "Hu" (胡) to "He", the surname of his father. As a youth, he did many odd jobs, including being a porter, tailor and blacksmith. In 1929, he followed his father and joined the Chinese Workers' and Peasants' Red Army and was part of He Long's security detail. He joined the Chinese Communist Party in June 1930. Upon graduation from the Hunan Hebei Red Army School in 1932, he was as the captain of an infantry brigade. He took part in the 4th Encirclement Campaign and was commended as the "model brigade" for assisting the 8th Division to break out of the Nationalist encirclement in Jiangxi Soviet.

In October 1932, He Bingyan led the 3rd Red Army out of the Nationalist Encirclement. However, due to the internal "revisionist" and "left-lean" purges in 1933, he was jailed for a brief amount of time before being released by He Long. After his release, he was appointed as the Chief of the Recruit Brigade. In the same year, his father, He Xuewen died in battle at Hefeng County.

In November 1935, he was named as the Commander of the 5th Division in the 2nd Red Army to lead the forces in the Long March. During a battle in Suining County, Hunan, He Bingyan was hit by a bullet in the arm which was amputated without anesthetic. After rendezvous with the main army forces, he was sent to Xi'an Guangren Hospital for treatment.

=== During the Second Sino-Japanese War ===
Following the outbreak of war, he was the commander of the 358th Brigade of He Long's 120th Division in the Eighth Route Army. After the establishment of the Second United Front, He Bingyan was assigned the official rank of Colonel by the National Revolutionary Army. He initially led it in skirmishes and guerrilla attacks, like the Ambush of Yanmen Pass on 18–21 October 1937, during the Battle of Xinkou in northern Shanxi. In December 1938, he served as a detachment leader in the 120th Division, actively working with Political Commissar Yu Qiuli to expand the army's area of influence across the northern banks of the Qing River. In winter, He Bingyan led a detachment into Jizhong and successively conducted battles in Lianzikou and Bei Biaoqiao, smashing a 3-layer encirclement by the Imperial Japanese army.

In 1940, He Bingyan was ordered to return to Jin Sui Border Zone to participate in the Hundred Regiments Battle. He was subsequently appointed as the deputy commander of the 358th Brigade. He was then transferred to Yan'an for studies at Central Party School of the Chinese Communist Party. In November 1944, he was ordered to incite and establish an anti-Japanese base in Honghu and serve as the commander of the 3rd Division of the New Fourth Army in, Hubei, Henan and Jiangxi provinces.

=== After the founding of the PRC ===
After the founding of the People's Republic of China He Bingyan became plagued with ill health and received long-term treatment. He had lost his right arm, had received 11 injuries, 16 scars and suffered from high blood pressure, arthritis, bronchial asthma and kidney disease. Despite these illnesses, he continued to work in the Chinese army. In 1955, he was awarded the rank of general. Five years later, on 1 July 1960, He Bingyan died in Chengdu.

Military offices
New title	Commander of the PLA Sichuan Military District; 1952–1955	Succeeded by Hu Jicheng
New title	Commander of the PLA Chengdu Military Region; 1955–1960	Succeeded by Huang Xinting
