= Qingtongxia Joint Tactic Training Base =

- Western Theater Command Ground Force
- Simplified Chinese: 中国人民解放军陆军青铜峡合同战术训练基地
- Traditional Chinese: 中國人民解放軍陸軍青銅峽合同戰術訓練基地
Transcriptions
Standard Mandarin
- Hanyu Pinyin: Zhōngguó Rénmín Jiěfàngjūn Lùjūn Qīngtóngxiá Hétóng Zhànshù Xùnliàn Jīdì

The Qingtongxia Joint Tactic Training Base is a training base located in Qingtongxia, Ningxia, China and is under the jurisdiction of the Western Theater Command Ground Force.

== History ==
Qingtongxia Joint Tactic Training Base was established at the end of the 20th century under the jurisdiction of former Jinan Military Region.

In December 2015, the China-Pakistan "Friendship-2015" joint anti-terrorism training with 100 soldiers from both sides kicked off in the base.

In August 2021, the China-Russia joint military exercise ZAPAD/INTERACTION-2021, also known as West Joint-2021, with more than 10,000 troops from the Western Theater Command and the Russian Armed Forces' Eastern Military District, as well as multiple types of aircraft and land weapons from both sides, was held at the base.
