= Ye Wanyong (China) =

Chinese politician

- 叶万勇
- Born: September 1953 (age 73); Wuhan, Hubei, China
- Military career
- Allegiance: China
- Branch: People's Liberation Army
- Service years: 1966–2013
- Rank: Major general
- Commands: Political Commissar of Sichuan Military District (2006–2013)

Ye Wanyong
- Traditional Chinese: 葉萬勇
- Simplified Chinese: 叶万勇
Transcriptions
Standard Mandarin
- Hanyu Pinyin: Yè Wànyǒng

Ye Wanyong (born September 1953) is a disgraced former major general (shao jiang) in the People's Liberation Army of China. He served as Deputy Political Commissar of Tibet Military District from December 2005 to October 2006, and Political Commissar of Sichuan Military District between October 2006 to 2007.

Ye attained the rank of major general in July 2001. He spent more than 37 years in Tibet Autonomous Region before being transferred to Sichuan in 2006. He retired in November 2013, and was investigated for "violating discipline" in 2014.

== Life and career ==
Ye was born and raised in Wuhan, capital of Hubei province. He graduated from Sichuan University, majoring in management science and engineering. He began his political career in February 1969, and joined the Chinese Communist Party in October 1971.

When Mao Zedong launched the Cultural Revolution was in 1966, Ye joined the People's Liberation Army as a soldier. Three years later, he worked in the Tibet Military District. He became the Director of the Political Department of Tibet Military District in July 1996, and was promoted to Deputy Political Commissar in December 2005. In October 2006 he was promoted again to become the Political Commissar of Sichuan Military District. He concurrently served as a member of the Standing Committee of the Sichuan Provincial Committee of the Chinese Communist Party in July 2007, the province's highest ruling council.

Ye retired on November 18, 2013, and was highly praised by Zhu Fuxi, the Political Commissar of the Chengdu Military Region.

On June 25, 2014, he was stripped of his membership of China's political advisory body, the Chinese People's Political Consultative Conference. It was later revealed that Ye had been investigated by the Commission for Discipline Inspection of the Central Military Commission beginning in May 2014, and that his case had been moved to military prosecution organs for further processing. Some sources have reported that Ye may have been implicated in the wider investigation on former Sichuan party chief Zhou Yongkang.

Military offices
| Preceded by ? | Political Commissar of Sichuan Military District; 2006–2013 | Succeeded by Liu Jiaguo |
