= Zhao Zongqi =

Chinese general who was in charge of the China-India border (2016–2020)

General Zhao Zongqi
- 赵宗岐
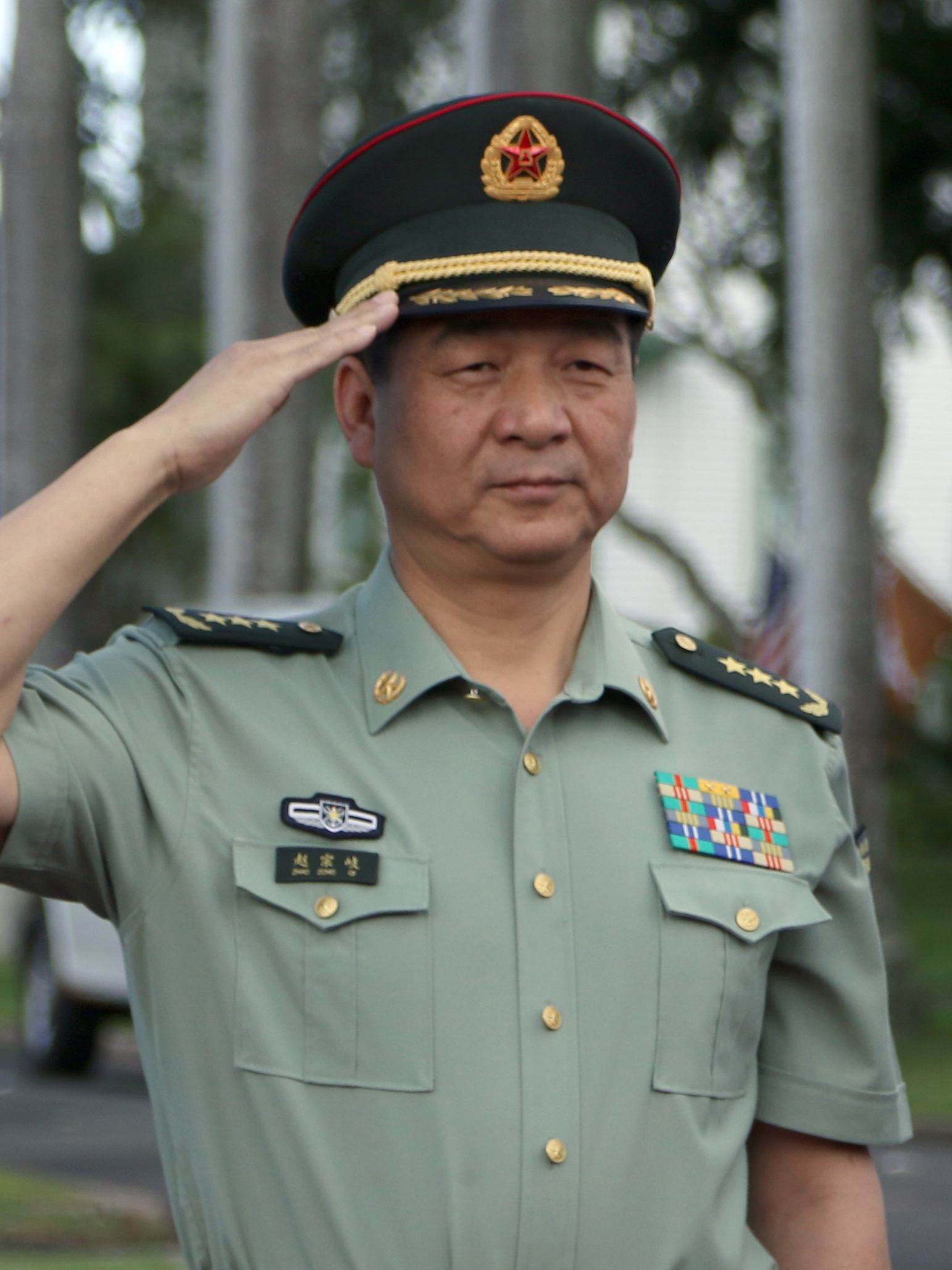
- Zhao Zongqi in 2016

Commander of the Western Theater Command
- In office February 2016 – December 2020
- Preceded by: New title
- Succeeded by: Zhang Xudong

Commander of the Jinan Military Region
- In office November 2012 – January 2016
- Preceded by: Fan Changlong
- Succeeded by: Ji Wenming

Chief of Staff of the Jinan Military Region
- In office December 2007 – November 2012
- Preceded by: Zhang Hetian
- Succeeded by: Ma Yiming

Personal details
- Born: April 1955 (age 71) Bin County, Heilongjiang, China
- Party: Chinese Communist Party
- Education: PLA Information Engineering University; PLA National Defence University

Military service
- Allegiance: People's Republic of China
- Branch/service: People's Liberation Army Ground Force
- Years of service: 1970–2021
- Rank: General

Zhao Zongqi (Chinese: 赵宗岐; pinyin: Zhào Zōngqí; born 1955) is a general (shang jiang) of the People's Liberation Army (PLA) of China and a former Commander of the Western Theater Command.

== Early life and career ==
Zhao was born in Bin County, Heilongjiang province. He joined the army in December 1970 and was assigned to the 118th Regiment of the 40th Division of the 14th Army stationed in the Yunnan border area. During this period, he served as the reconnaissance squad leader, acting platoon leader, and regiment reconnaissance staff officer. Later, he participated in the Western Front of the Sino-Vietnamese War as a reconnaissance team member, infiltrating 10 kilometers deep to collect intelligence and assisting the 40th Division in the battle of Lao Cai. After the war, he was promoted to the reconnaissance department of the 40th Division for his meritorious service. In the subsequent Sino-Vietnamese conflicts of 1979–1991, he led his team to support the 31st Division of the 14th Army on the Yunnan border area with Vietnam.

After the Million Disarmament, he was transferred from the division to head the 118th Regiment. From 1986 to November 1988, he was transferred to the Institute of Foreign Languages at the National University of Defense Technology to study Arabic. After graduation, he went to the Chinese Embassy in Tanzania and served as a military attaché in Tanzania. He returned to China in August 1991 and served as the deputy chief of staff of the 40th Division of the 14th Group Army.

== Western Theater (Tibet and China-India border) ==
In April 1992, he was transferred to the Tibet Military District as the commander of the 52nd Mountain Infantry Brigade. The 52nd Brigade was one of the first division-to-brigade units in the People's Liberation Army. He was stationed in Tibet until 2003 to manage the 52nd Brigade. During this period, he insisted on strengthening the construction of border outposts in Tibet (Sino-Indian border dispute), advocated large-scale military training within the army and improved the combat readiness and exercise capabilities of the 52nd Brigade. In 1998, he was promoted to deputy chief of staff of the Tibet Military District, and soon became its chief of staff. In July 2001, he was promoted from deputy army officer to major general.

At the end of 2003, Zhao Zongqi was appointed as the deputy commander of the Chongqing Garrison Command. In October 2004, he was transferred to the 14th Army as its commander. In September 2007, he was appointed as the commander of the 13th Army. In 2008, he was transferred to the Jinan Military Region as its chief of staff. In November 2012, he was appointed the commander of the Jinan Military Region, becoming the youngest commander of a military region at the time. On July 31, 2015, he was promoted to the rank of general.

On February 1, 2016, Zhao was named commander of the re-organized Western Theater Command, the largest theatre command of China, and served in this position till December 2020. He oversaw the Western Theatre during the 2017 China–India border standoff and 2020 China–India skirmishes.

In December 2020, Zhao Zongqi retired due to age and was replaced by Zhang Xudong as commander of the Western Theater Command.

On October 1, 2019, he had led the flag formation at the military parade celebrating the 70th anniversary of the People's Republic of China.

== Political career ==
Zhao was a member of the 13th National People's Congress, 14th National Committee of the Chinese People's Political Consultative Conference (Standing Committee), 17th National Congress of the Chinese Communist Party and the 18th and 19th Central Committees of the Chinese Communist Party.

On February 28, 2021, he was appointed vice-chairperson of the National People's Congress Foreign Affairs Committee.

On August 26, 2026, he was removed as deputy director of the Ethnic and Religious Affairs Committee and has his membership to the 14th National Committee of the Chinese People's Political Consultative Conference revoked.

== Media and publications ==
In 2006, Zhao was hired as a military consultant for the TV series Soldiers Sortie.

Zhao was also a lyricist. The official hymn of the Western Theater Command, released on 4 November 2020, "The Battle Hymn of the Western Theater Command" (Chinese: 西部战区战歌; pinyin: Xībù zhànqū zhàngē) was written by Zhao when he was its commander.

His has published articles on military science including:

- "Research on Informationized Combat Command" (2005) published by Military Science Press
- "What capabilities do we need to accomplish diverse military missions?"
- "Putting strategic delivery capability construction in an important position"

Military offices
Preceded by Zhang Hetian	Chief of Staff of the Jinan Military Region; 2007–2012	Succeeded by Ma Yiming
Preceded by Fan Changlong	Commander of the Jinan Military Region; 2012–2016	Succeeded by Ji Wenming
New title	Commander of the Western Theater Command; 2016–2020	Succeeded by Zhang Xudong
