= Yang Yi (military officer) =

Chinese general

- 杨毅

Commander of the Western Theater Command Ground Force
- Incumbent
- Assumed office August 2021
- Preceded by: Xu Qiling

deputy commander of the Western Theater Command
- Incumbent
- Assumed office August 2021
- Commander: Wang Haijiang
- Preceded by: Xu Qiling

Commander of the 76th Group Army
- In office June 2018 – september 2021
- Preceded by: Fan Chengcai
- Succeeded by: Xu Jiangang

Personal details
- Born: 1966 (age 59–60) Jiangbei, Chongqing, China
- Party: Chinese Communist Party

Military service
- Allegiance: People's Republic of China
- Branch/service: People's Liberation Army Ground Force
- Years of service: ?-present
- Rank: Lieutenant General
- Unit: 14th Army (People's Republic of China) Chengdu Military Region 76th Group Army Western Theater Command Ground Force Western Theater Command

Chinese name
- Simplified Chinese: 杨毅
- Traditional Chinese: 楊毅
Transcriptions
Standard Mandarin
- Hanyu Pinyin: Yáng Yì

Yang Yi (Chinese: 杨毅; born 1966) is a lieutenant general (zhongjiang) of the People's Liberation Army (PLA). Currently he serves as the commander of the Western Theater Command Ground Force, replacing Xu Qiling (Chinese: 徐起零), in office since September 2021.

== Biography ==
Yang Yi, born in Jiangbei, Chongqing in 1966. He served as an artillery commander in a regiment of the Chengdu Military Region, deputy chief of staff & chief of staff of the 14th Group Army and then as deputy commander of the 76th Group Army and commander from June 2018 to September 2021. He participated in the 90th anniversary of the founding of the People's Liberation Army, leading the information and communication team. In August 2021 he was promoted to the rank of lieutenant general and became the Commander of the Western Theater Command Ground Forces, concurrently serving as a deputy commander of the Western Theater Command.

Military offices
Preceded by Fan Chengcai	Commander of the 76th Group Army; 2018-2021	Succeeded by Xu Jiangang
Preceded by Xu Qiling	Commander of the Western Theater Command Ground Force; 2021-present	Incumbent
