= Liu Chengjun =

Liu Chengjun may refer to:

- Liu Chengjun (general) (born 1949), general of the Chinese People's Liberation Army
- Liu Jun (Northern Han) (926–968), or Liu Chengjun, Chinese emperor of Northern Han
