= Xu Deqing =

Chinese general

- 徐德清

Political Commissar of the Central Theater Command
- Incumbent
- Assumed office January 2022
- Commander: Wu Yanan; Huang Ming
- Preceded by: Zhu Shengling

Personal details
- Born: July 1963 (age 62) Chongqing County, Sichuan, China
- Party: Chinese Communist Party

Military service
- Allegiance: People's Republic of China
- Branch/service: People's Liberation Army Ground Force
- Years of service: ?–present
- Rank: General

Xu Deqing (Chinese: 徐德清; pinyin: Xú Déqīng; born July 1963) is a general (shangjiang) of the People's Liberation Army (PLA) serving as political commissar of the Central Theater Command, succeeding Zhu Shengling in January 2022. He has served a representative of the 19th and 20th National Congress of the Chinese Communist Party and the 20th Central Committee of the Chinese Communist Party.

== Biography ==
Xu was born in Chongqing County (now Chongzhou), Sichuan, in July 1963. In April 2013, he became deputy political commissar of the 13th Group Army, and was promoted to become political commissar of the 47th Group Army in August 2015. He was political commissar of the 71st Group Army in March 2017, and held that office until April 2018, when he was elevated to political commissar of the Western Theater Command Ground Force. In January 2022, he rose to become political commissar of the Central Theater Command, succeeding Zhu Shengling.

He was promoted to the rank of major general (shaojiang) in July 2014, lieutenant general (zhongjiang) in June 2019 and general (shangjiang) in January 2022.

Military offices
Preceded by Zhang Fuji (张福基)	Political Commissar of the 47th Group Army; 2015–2017	Succeeded by Position revoked
New title	Political Commissar of the 71st Group Army; 2017–2018	Succeeded by Yin Hongxing
Preceded by Xu Zhongbo	Political Commissar of the Western Theater Command Ground Force; 2018–2022	Succeeded by Wang Zhibin
Preceded by Zhu Shengling	Political Commissar of the Central Theater Command; 2022–present	Incumbent
