= Ma Yiming =

Ma Yiming, may refer to:

- Ma Yiming (lieutenant general), a lieutenant general in the People's Liberation Army of China.
- Ma Yiming (boxer), a Chinese professional boxer and the former WBO China Zone flyweight and WBO Asia Pacific light flyweight champion.
