= Xu Qiling =

General officer of the People's Liberation Army

- 徐起零
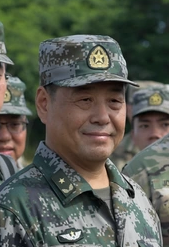
- Xu at a 2019 Military Exchange

Commander of the Western Theater Command
- In office June 2021 – August 2021
- Preceded by: Zhang Xudong
- Succeeded by: Wang Haijiang

Commander of the Western Theater Command Ground Force
- In office April 2020 – June 2021
- Preceded by: He Weidong
- Succeeded by: Yang Yi

Commander of the Eastern Theater Command Ground Force
- In office December 2018 – April 2020
- Preceded by: Qin Weijiang
- Succeeded by: Lin Xiangyang

Commander of the 79th Group Army
- In office March 2017 – December 2018
- Succeeded by: Huo Jiangang

Personal details
- Born: July 1962 (age 63) Huaiyang District, Zhoukou, Henan, China
- Party: Chinese Communist Party

Military service
- Allegiance: People's Republic of China
- Branch/service: People's Liberation Army Ground Force
- Rank: General

Xu Qiling (Chinese: 徐起零; pinyin: Xú Qǐlíng; born July 1962) is a general (shangjiang) of the People's Liberation Army (PLA). He was the commander of the Western Theater Command. He formerly served as commander of the Western Theater Command Ground Force, commander of the Eastern Theater Command Ground Force, and commander of the 79th Group Army.

== Biography ==
Born in Huaiyang District, Zhoukou, Henan in July 1962, Xu served in Jinan Military Region before serving as the chief of staff for the 54th Group Army. He served as deputy commander of the Central Theater Command in 2016 and held that office until March 2017, when he was appointed commander of the 79th Group Army. He rose in rank to become commander of the Eastern Theater Command Ground Force in December 2018, replacing Qin Weijiang. Xu was promoted to the rank of lieutenant general by the Central Military Commission Chairman Xi Jinping on 11 December 2019 and later to the rank of general on 5 July 2021. He considered to be a part of the Fujian clique of the Xi Jinping faction in the Chinese Communist Party.

In April 2020, Xu was transferred to and appointed the commander of the Western Theater Command Ground Force amid the 2020–2021 China–India skirmishes, replacing He Weidong. Xu's relatively young age and familiarity with air-to-ground joint operations needed for mountain warfare have been cited as reasons for promotion during the conflict.

In June 2021, Xu was chosen to replace Zhang Xudong as commander of the Western Theater Command, tensions with India ongoing. Zhang had left the post suffering from cancer and gastrointestinal problems. Zhang died four months later in October. After only two months serving as commander, Xu also stepped down reportedly also out of poor health and amid a number of illnesses among both commanders and troops.

Military offices
Preceded by	Commander of the 79th Group Army; 2017–2018	Succeeded by Huo Jiangang (霍建刚)
Preceded by Qin Weijiang	Commander of the Eastern Theater Command Ground Force; 2018–2020	Succeeded by Lin Xiangyang
Preceded by He Weidong	Commander of the Western Theater Command Ground Force; 2020–2021	Succeeded by Yang Yi
Preceded by Zhang Xudong	Commander of the Western Theater Command; 2021–2021	Succeeded by Wang Haijiang
