= Western Theater Command Ground Force =

- 中国人民解放军西部战区陆军
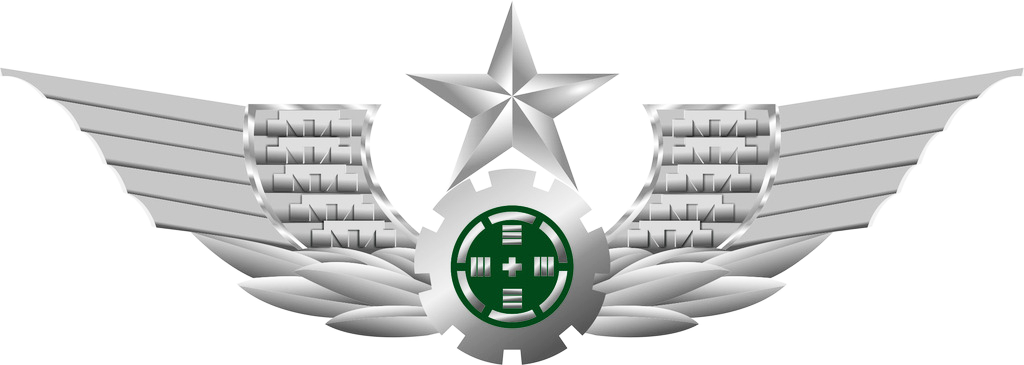
- Emblem of the People's Liberation Army Ground Force
- Active: 2016–present
- Country: People's Republic of China
- Allegiance: Chinese Communist Party
- Branch: People's Liberation Army Ground Force
- Part of: Western Theater Command
- Garrison/HQ: Lanzhou, Gansu
- Mottos: 为人民服务 "Serve the People"
- Colors: Red and Green
- March: Military Anthem of the People's Liberation Army

Commanders
- Commander: Lieutenant General Yang Yi
- Political Commissar: Lieutenant General Zheng Yanpo

Western Theater Command Ground Force
- Western Theater Command Ground Force
- Simplified Chinese: 中国人民解放军西部战区陆军
- Traditional Chinese: 中國人民解放軍西部戰區陸軍
Transcriptions
Standard Mandarin
- Hanyu Pinyin: Zhōngguó Rénmín Jiěfàngjūn Xībù Zhànqū Lùjūn

The Western Theater Command Ground Force is the ground force under the Western Theater Command. Its headquarters is in Lanzhou, Gansu. The current commander is Yang Yi and the current political commissar is Xu Deqing.

== History ==
The Western Theater Command Ground Force was officially established on 31 December 2015 with the troops of former Lanzhou Military Region and Chengdu Military Region.

== Functional departments ==
- General Staff
- Political Work Department
- Logistics Department
- Equipment department
- Disciplinary Inspection Committee

== Directly subordinate functional units ==
- Qingtongxia Joint Tactic Training Base
- Daliangshan Joint Tactic Training Base
- PLA Ground Force Fifth Comprehensive Training Base
- PLA Ground Force Sixth Comprehensive Training Base

== Directly subordinate combat units ==
=== Group armies ===
- 76th Group Army (stationed in Xining, Qinghai)
- 77th Group Army (stationed in Chongzhou, Sichuan)

=== Other army units ===
- Third Brigade of Reconnaissance Intelligence
- Third Brigade of Information Support
- Third Brigade of Electronic Warfare
- 53rd Mountain Combined Arms Brigade
- 54th Brigade, Tibet Military District

== List of leaders ==
=== Commanders ===
English name	Chinese name	Took office	Left office	Notes
He Weidong	何卫东	2019	December 2019	
Xu Qiling	徐起零	April 2020	June 2021	
Yang Yi	杨毅	September 2021		

=== Political commissars ===
English name	Chinese name	Took office	Left office	Notes
Xu Zhongbo	徐忠波	2016	December 2017	
Xu Deqing	徐德清	April 2018	January 2022	
Wang Zhibin	汪志斌	March 2022	December 2023	
Zheng Yanpo	郑堰坡	2024		

=== Chiefs of staff ===
English name	Chinese name	Took office	Left office	Notes
Fan Chengcai	范承才	2016	January 2017	
Cao Yimin	曹益民	January 2017		
