= Ye Libin =

- 夜礼斌

Chairman of the China Tobacco Yunnan Industry Co., Ltd.
- In office May 2014 – January 2018
- Preceded by: ?
- Succeeded by: TBA

Communist Party Secretary of Zhaotong
- In office December 2007 – February 2013
- Deputy: Wang Minzheng
- Preceded by: Deng Xianpei
- Succeeded by: Liu Jianhua

Governor of Chuxiong Yi Autonomous Prefecture
- In office August 2000 – August 2005
- Party Secretary: Ding Shaoxiang
- Preceded by: Luo Zhengfu
- Succeeded by: Yang Hongwei

Personal details
- Born: December 1957 (age 68) Yongren County, Yunnan, China
- Party: Chinese Communist Party
- Education: Kunming University of Science and Technology

Military service
- Allegiance: People's Republic of China
- Branch/service: People's Liberation Army Ground Force
- Years of service: 1976–1982
- Unit: 1st Battalion of the 2nd Independent Regiment of Sichuan Military District

Chinese name
- Simplified Chinese: 夜礼斌
- Traditional Chinese: 夜禮斌
Transcriptions
Standard Mandarin
- Hanyu Pinyin: Yè Lǐbīn

Ye Libin (Chinese: 夜礼斌; born December 1957) is a former Chinese executive and politician of Yi ethnicity. He surrendered himself to the anti-corruption agency of China in November 2022, a year and a half since his retirement. Previously he served as chairman of the China Tobacco Yunnan Industry Co., Ltd. and before that, party secretary of Zhaotong, head of the Yunnan Provincial Civil Affairs Department, governor of Chuxiong Yi Autonomous Prefecture, and party secretary of Chuxiong City.

He was a representative of the 18th National Congress of the Chinese Communist Party. He was a delegate to the 10th and 12th National People's Congress.

== Early life and education ==
Ye was born in Yongren County, Yunnan, in December 1957, and graduated from Kunming University of Science and Technology. He enlisted in the People's Liberation Army (PLA) in 1976, and served in the 1st Battalion of the 2nd Independent Regiment of Sichuan Military District until 1982. He joined the Chinese Communist Party (CCP) in November 1978.

== Political career ==
Since July 1982, Ye successively served as secretary of the CCP Yongren County Party Committee Office, deputy party secretary and governor of Menghu District, director of Yongren County Finance Bureau, deputy director and then director of the Chuxiong Prefecture Finance Bureau.

He was vice governor of Chuxiong Yi Autonomous Prefecture in February 1996, in addition to serving as party secretary of Chuxiong City since April 1997. In August 2000, he was named acting governor, confirmed in March 2001.

In March 2006, he was appointed head of the Yunnan Provincial Civil Affairs Department, he remained in that position until December 2007, when he was transferred to Zhaotong and appointed party secretary, his first foray into a prefectural leadership role.

After a year as leader of Yunnan Provincial Leading Group for Immigration, Ye was chosen as chairman and party branch secretary of the China Tobacco Yunnan Industry Co., Ltd. in May 2014, a post he kept until November 2018. He retired in February 2021.

== Investigation ==
On 24 November 2022, he turned himself in and is cooperating with the Central Commission for Discipline Inspection (CCDI) and National Commission of Supervision for investigation of "suspected violations of disciplines and laws".

Government offices
Preceded by Luo Zhengfu	Governor of Chuxiong Yi Autonomous Prefecture; 2000–2005	Succeeded by Yang Hongwei
Party political offices
Preceded by Deng Xianpei	Communist Party Secretary of Zhaotong; 2007–2013	Succeeded by Liu Jianhua
Business positions
Preceded by ?	Chairman of the China Tobacco Yunnan Industry Co., Ltd. 2014–2018	Succeeded by TBA
