= Guo Huaruo =

- 郭化若
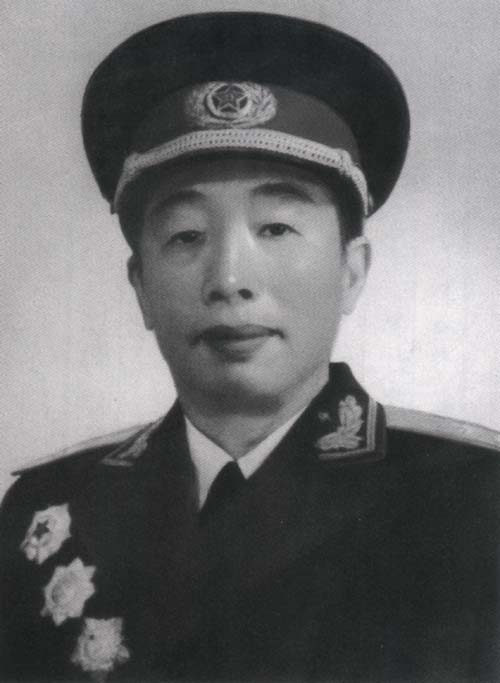
- Guo in 1955

Commander of the Shanghai Garrison Command
- In office August 1949 – August 1955
- Preceded by: Song Shilun
- Succeeded by: Wang Bicheng

Political Commissar the Shanghai Garrison Command
- In office May 1949 – November 1950
- Preceded by: New title
- Succeeded by: Li Shiying

Personal details
- Born: Guo Kebin (郭可彬); 10 August 1904 Fuzhou, Fujian, Qing China
- Died: 26 November 1995 (aged 91) Beijing, China
- Party: Chinese Communist Party
- Children: 2
- Education: Republic of China Military Academy

Military service
- Allegiance: People's Republic of China
- Branch/service: New Guangxi clique (1923–1927); Chinese Red Army (1927–1937); Eighth Route Army (1937–1947); People's Liberation Army Ground Force (1947–1985)
- Years of service: 1923–1985
- Rank: Lieutenant general
- Battles/wars: Second Sino-Japanese War; Chinese Civil War
- Awards: August 1 Medal (1st Class); Order of Independence and Freedom (1st Class); Order of Liberation (1st Class); Red Star Merit Honor Medal (1st Class)

Chinese name
- Chinese: 郭化若
Transcriptions
Standard Mandarin
- Hanyu Pinyin: Guō Huàruò
- Wade–Giles: Kuo Hua-jo

Birth name
- Chinese: 郭可彬
Transcriptions
Standard Mandarin
- Hanyu Pinyin: Guō Kěbīn

Guo Huaruo (Chinese: 郭化若; pinyin: Guō Huàruò; Wade–Giles: Kuo Hua-jo; 1904−1995) was a Chinese military strategist and lieutenant general of the People's Liberation Army. According to Alastair Iain Johnston, Guo was until the mid-1980s "the CCP's most authoritative interpreter and annotator" of The Art of War by Sun Tzu, but Guo was "practically unknown in the West".

Johnson said 'Guo stressed that from a Marxist–Leninist perspective the notion of "not fighting and subduing the enemy"'—the core of the conventional interpretation of Sun Zi—was un-Marxist, since class enemies could not be credibly defeated without the application of violence.'

Around June 4, 1937, Guo was the dean of studies of Qingyang Infantry School.

== Works ==
Guo wrote A Preliminary Study of Sun Tzu's Art of War (T: 孫子兵法初步研究, S: 孙子兵法初步研究, P: Sūnzǐ Bīngfǎ Chūbù Yánjiū), which was completed in 1939. It was used as a military textbook in areas controlled by Communists. The book says "The position Kuo has now enjoyed as a leading military theoretician seems to date from that period."

By 1971, Guo's latest edition of The Art of War was A Modern Translation with New Chapter Arrangement of Sun Tzu's ʻArt of Warʼ (T: 今譯新編孫子兵法, S: 今译新编孙子兵法, P: Jīnyì Xīn Biān Sūnzǐ Bīngfǎ). In this edition, Guo rearranged the material, used Simplified Chinese, and phrased Sun Tzu's verses in colloquial Chinese.

=== List of works ===
- A Preliminary Study of Sun Tzu's Art of War (T: 孫子兵法初步研究, S: 孙子兵法初步研究, P: Sūnzǐ Bīngfǎ Chūbù Yánjiū)
- A Modern Translation with New Chapter Arrangement of Sun Tzu's ʻArt of Warʼ (T: 今譯新編孫子兵法, S: 今译新编孙子兵法, P: Jīnyì Xīn Biān Sūnzǐ Bīngfǎ)
- Guo Huaruo's Selected Essays on Military Affairs (S: 郭化若军事论文选集, T: 郭化若軍事論文選集 Jūnshì Lùnwén Xuǎnjí). Liberation Army Press (Beijing), 1989.
  - Includes "Sun Zi yi zhu' qian yan," the preface to "Translation and Annotation of Sun Zi," 1983.

== Notes ==
Military offices
New title	Political Commissar the Shanghai Garrison Command; 1949–1950	Succeeded by Li Shiying
Preceded by Song Shilun	Commander of the Shanghai Garrison Command; 1949–1955	Succeeded by Wang Bicheng
