= Shanghai Garrison Command =

- 中国人民解放军上海警备区
- Founded: May 6, 1949; 76 years ago
- Country: People's Republic of China
- Allegiance: Chinese Communist Party
- Type: Garrison command
- Role: Command and control
- Part of: People's Liberation Army
- Headquarters: Shanghai

Commanders
- Commander: Major general (shaojiang) Chen Binglian
- Political Commisar: Major general (shaojiang) Hu Shijun

Chinese name
- Simplified Chinese: 中国人民解放军上海警备区
- Traditional Chinese: 中國人民解放軍上海警備區
Transcriptions
Standard Mandarin
- Hanyu Pinyin: Zhōngguó Rénmín Jiěfàngjūn Shànghǎi Jǐngbèiqū

Former name
- Simplified Chinese: 中国人民解放军淞沪警备司令部
- Traditional Chinese: 中國人民解放軍淞滬警備司令部
Transcriptions
Standard Mandarin
- Hanyu Pinyin: Zhōngguó Rénmín Jiěfàngjūn Soōnghù Jǐngbèi Sīlìngbù

The Shanghai Garrison Command (Chinese: 中国人民解放军上海警备区; full name People's Liberation Army Shanghai Garrison Command or PLA Shanghai Garrison Command) is a military district of the National Defense Mobilization Department of the Central Military Commission in China.

== History ==
On 29 May 1949, the Songhu Garrison Command (中国人民解放军淞沪警备司令部) was officially established, with Commander Song Shilun, Political Commissar Guo Huaruo, and Chief of Staff Tan Jian, which is the predecessor of Shanghai Garrison Command.

On 31 October 1955, the Ministry of National Defense decided to expand the establishment of the Shanghai Police Area under the Nanjing Military Area Command based on the security forces of the Nanjing Military Region and part of the Songhu Police Area Command. On November 4, it was officially named the "People's Liberation Army Shanghai Garrison Command" (中国人民解放军上海警备区).

== Leaders ==
=== Commanders ===
Name (English)	Name (Chinese)	Tenure begins	Tenure ends	Note
Song Shilun	宋时轮	May 1949	August 1949	
Guo Huaruo	郭化若	August 1949	August 1955	
Wang Bicheng	王必成	August 1955	November 1960	
Rao Zijian	饶子健	November 1960	May 1965	
Liao Zhengguo	廖政国	May 1965	April 1970	
Zhou Chunlin	周纯麟	April 1970	May 1978	
He Yixiang	何以祥	May 1978	June 1981	
Wang Jingkun	王景昆	June 1981	May 1983	
Guo Tao	郭涛	May 1983	June 1985	
Ba Zhongtan	巴忠倓	August 1985	June 1990	
Xu Wenyi	徐文义	June 1990	December 1995	
Wang Wenhui	王文惠	December 1995	June 2005	
Wang Qinhong	江勤宏	June 2005	April 2010	
Peng Shuigen	彭水根	April 2010	March 2014	
He Weidong	何卫东	March 2014	July 2016	
Zhang Xiaoming	张晓明	August 2016	October 2020	
Liu Jie	刘杰	October 2020	August 2024	
Chen Binglian	陈连兵	August 2024		

=== Political commissars ===
Name (English)	Name (Chinese)	Tenure begins	Tenure ends	Note
Guo Huaruo	郭化若	May 1949	November 1950	
Li Shiying	李士英	November 1950	June 1952	
Xu Jianguo	许建国	June 1952	December 1953	
Liang Guobin	梁国斌	December 1953	October 1955	
Ke Qingshi	柯庆施	October 1955	November 1958	First Political Commissar
Chen Pixian	陈丕显	October 1955	November 1958	Second Political Commissar
Chen Pixian	陈丕显	November 1958	May 1967	First Political Commissar
Qin Hualong	秦化龙	May 1960	April 1964	Second Political Commissar
Liu Wenxue	刘文学	March 1962	May 1978	Third Political Commissar
Wang Liusheng	王六生	July 1964	May 1965	Second Political Commissar
Li Shiyan	李世焱	August 1965	October 1969	Second Political Commissar
Zhang Chunqiao	张春桥	May 1967	October 1976	First Political Commissar
Liu Yaozong	刘耀宗	August 1969	May 1978	
Wang Hongwen	王洪文	September 1971	October 1976	
Li Baoqi	李宝奇	October 1975	January 1981	
Peng Chong	彭冲	July 1978	June 1980	First Political Commissar
Chen Guodong	陈国栋	June 1980	June 1985	
Zhang Chen	章尘	December 1980	May 1983	
Ping Changxi	平昌喜	May 1983	June 1987	
Yang Zhifan	杨志泛	June 1987	September 1989	
Zhu Xiaochu	朱晓初	June 1990	March 1994	
Wang Chuanyou	王传友	March 1994	April 2000	
Zhang Lizhi	张立志	April 2000	June 2003	
Dai Changyou	戴长友	June 2003	November 2006	
Wu Qi	吴齐	November 2006	February 2009	
Li Guangjin	李光金	May 2009	July 2010	
Zhu Zhengping	朱争平	July 2010	March 2013	
Zhu Shengling	朱生岭	March 2013	December 2014	
Ma Jiali	马家利	May 2015	May 2017	
Ling Xi	凌希	May 2017	July 2021	
Xue Hongwei	薛宏伟	July 2021	June 2022	
Hu Shijun	胡世军	January 2023		
