= Li Fengbiao =

- 李凤彪

Political Commissar of the Western Theater Command
- In office June 2021 – September 2025
- Preceded by: Wu Shezhou

Commander of the People's Liberation Army Strategic Support Force
- In office April 2019 – June 2021
- Preceded by: Gao Jin
- Succeeded by: Ju Qiansheng

Chief of Staff of the Central Theater Command
- In office January 2016 – April 2019
- Preceded by: New title
- Succeeded by: Wang Changjiang

Personal details
- Born: October 1959 (age 66) Anxin County, Hebei, China
- Party: Chinese Communist Party

Military service
- Allegiance: People's Republic of China
- Branch/service: People's Liberation Army Ground Force
- Years of service: 1978–present
- Rank: General

Chinese name
- Simplified Chinese: 李凤彪
- Traditional Chinese: 李鳳彪
Transcriptions
Standard Mandarin
- Hanyu Pinyin: Lǐ Fèngbiāo

Li Fengbiao (Chinese: 李凤彪; born October 1959) is a general (Shangjiang) of the People's Liberation Army (PLA). He is the current political commissar of the Western Theater Command, one of the five military regions of the People's Liberation Army. He was a member of the 19th Central Committee of the Chinese Communist Party.

== Biography ==
Li was born in Anxin County, Hebei, in October 1959. He enlisted in the People's Liberation Army in 1978. He was chief of staff of the 15th Airborne Corps in 2007 before serving as commander of the 15th Army (now People's Liberation Army Air Force Airborne Corps) in July 2011. In December 2014, he was assigned deputy commander of the Chengdu Military Region, one of seven military districts in China. In January 2016, he was appointed deputy commander and chief of staff of the newly founded Central Theater Command. He was commander of the People's Liberation Army Strategic Support Force in April 2019, and held that office until June 2021, when he was appointed political commissar of the Western Theater Command.

He was promoted to the rank of major general (Shaojiang) in 2008, lieutenant general (zhongjiang) in July 2016, and general (Shangjiang) in December 2019.

On 26 June 2026, the Standing Committee of the National People's Congress removed Li as a delegate to the 14th National People's Congress.

Military offices
Preceded by Yao Hengbin	Commander of the 15th Army; 2011–2014	Succeeded by Liu Faqing
New title	Chief of Staff of the Central Theater Command; 2016–2019	Succeeded by Wang Changjiang
Preceded by Gao Jin	Commander of the People's Liberation Army Strategic Support Force; 2019–2021	Succeeded by Ju Qiansheng
Preceded by Wu Shezhou	Political Commissar of the Western Theater Command; 2021–present	Incumbent
