= Daoming (town) =

Town in China

Daoming 道明镇
- Town
- Location in Sichuan
- Coordinates: 30°40′23″N 103°36′05″E
- Country: People's Republic of China
- Province: Sichuan
- Prefecture-level city: Chengdu
- County-level city: Chongzhou
- Time zone: UTC+8 (China Standard)

Daoming (Chinese: 道明镇; pinyin: Dàomíng zhèn) is a town located in Chongzhou City, Chengdu, Sichuan Province, China. It has become noteworthy as a hub for bamboo weaving arts, including traditional basketry and contemporary sculpture and architecture.
