= Xi Jinping faction =

Political faction of the Chinese Communist Party

Xi Jinping faction 习近平派系
- Leader: Xi Jinping
- Founded: 2007; 19 years ago
- Headquarters: Beijing and Hangzhou
- Ideology: Socialism with Chinese characteristics

Xi Jinping faction
- Simplified Chinese: 习近平派系
- Traditional Chinese: 習近平派系
Transcriptions
Standard Mandarin
- Hanyu Pinyin: Xí Jìnpíng pàixì

Xi Clan
- Chinese: 習家軍
- Simplified Chinese: 习家军
Transcriptions
Standard Mandarin
- Hanyu Pinyin: Xí Jiājūn

New Zhijiang Army
- Simplified Chinese: 之江新军
- Traditional Chinese: 之江新軍
Transcriptions
Standard Mandarin
- Hanyu Pinyin: Zhījiāng Xīnjūn

The Xi Jinping faction, also referred to as the Xi Clan, is a term used by political analysts to describe a network of officials within the Chinese Communist Party (CCP) closely associated with General Secretary Xi Jinping.

The faction encompasses officials who advanced their political careers under Xi's patronage during his earlier leadership tenures in various provinces. Those who served under Xi during his time as Party Secretary of Zhejiang (2002–2007) are often referred to as the New Zhijiang Army, while those with prior affiliations to Xi from his period in Fujian are collectively known as the Fujian clique. In addition, there are other groups of officials, including those that worked in Shaanxi (Xi's home province), those affiliated with Xi during his tenure in Shanghai (2007), or those hailing from a military-industrial complex background.

Officials affiliated with Xi have rapidly gained dominance during his leadership, leading Xi's faction to be the dominant one. Of the 25 members of the 19th Politburo, 11 had previously worked with Xi, or were fellow townsmen or classmates. Nearly all members of the 20th Politburo are considered to be a part of the Xi Jinping faction.

== New Zhijiang Army ==
The New Zhijiang Army refers to people who were closely associated with Xi during his tenure in Zhejiang and identify with his political views, and who have since then taken on prominent political posts at the provincial level or in central party and state organs. The term was first widely used by Ma Haoliang (马浩亮), editor at Hong Kong-based newspaper Ta Kung Pao, in the article "New Zhijiang Army of Chinese Politics". The term Zhijiang refers to the Qiantang River, which runs through the province, but is often used as a poetic reference for the greater Zhejiang region. The term was initially used as title to Xi Jinping's book Zhijiang Xinyu, a book compiling the political philosophies of Xi Jinping during his five-year term as party chief of Zhejiang, published in 2007.

Name	Born	Office held in Zhejiang during Xi's term	Office held at present
Cai Qi 蔡奇	December 1955	Party Secretary of Quzhou, Party Secretary of Taizhou	First-ranked Secretary of the CCP Secretariat
Huang Kunming 黄坤明	November 1956	Mayor of Huzhou; Party Secretary of Jiaxing	Party Secretary of Guangdong
Chen Derong 陈德荣	March 1961	Mayor of Jiaxing	Chief executive of China Baowu Steel Group
Bayanqolu 巴音朝鲁	October 1955	Party Secretary of Ningbo	
Lou Yangsheng 楼阳生	October 1959	Party Secretary of Lishui	
Xia Baolong 夏宝龙	December 1952	Deputy Party Secretary of Zhejiang	Director of the Hong Kong and Macao Affairs Office
Li Qiang 李强	July 1959	Secretary-General of Zhejiang Party Committee	Premier of China
Chen Min'er 陈敏尔	September 1960	Head of Zhejiang provincial party Propaganda Department	Party Secretary of Tianjin
Ying Yong 应勇	November 1957	Director of Supervision Department, Zhejiang; President of Zhejiang High Court; Deputy Secretary of Zhejiang Discipline Inspection Commission	Procurator-General of the Supreme People's Procuratorate
Zhong Shaojun 钟绍军	1968	Deputy Head of the Organization Department of Zhejiang Party Committee	
Li Xi 李希	1956		Secretary of the Central Commission for Discipline Inspection
Chen Xi 陈希	September 1953		President of the Central Party School
He Lifeng 何立峰	February 1955		Vice Premier of China
Shu Guozeng 舒国增	1956		
Chen Yixin 陈一新	September 1959		Minister of State Security

== Fujian clique ==
The Fujian clique refers to a group of Chinese politicians closely allied with Xi, who developed this network of trusted allies during his time in Fujian from 1985 to 2002, and has appointed them to influential roles and positions within Chinese politics since he became leader of China, particularly within the military and police. The Fujian clique is one of the two most important political groupings in the Xi administration alongside the New Zhijiang Army.

- Wang Xiaohong, State Councilor and Minister of Public Security,
- Deng Weiping, member of the Party Committee of the Ministry of Public Security,
- He Weidong, Vice Chairman of the Central Military Commission (2022–2025),
- Zhuang Rongwen, Director of the Cyberspace Administration of China,
- He Lifeng, Vice Premier of the People's Republic of China,
- Cai Qi, First Secretary of the Secretariat of the Chinese Communist Party,
- Miao Hua, Director of the Political Work Department of the Central Military Commission (2017–2025)
- Zhao Keshi, Director of the Logistic Support Department of the Central Military Commission (2012–2017)
- Cai Yingting, Commander of Nanjing Military Region (2012–2016)
- Huang Kunming, Communist Party Secretary of Guangdong

== Others ==
Other politicians have been named by Chinese-language media as associates of Xi Jinping. They have known or worked under him as a result of their regional tenures in Shaanxi province (Xi's "home province"), the southeast (Zhejiang and Fujian provinces), or through Tsinghua University, where Xi spent time in his youth. Those named include Wang Qishan, Li Zhanshu, Liu He, Chen Xi, He Yiting, Wang Xiaohong, Li Shulei, and Huang Xingguo (since disgraced). In the military, Liu Yuan, Zhang Youxia, and Liu Yazhou have been named as some of Xi's top associates.

== See also ==
- Shanghai clique
- Tuanpai
