= Li Lianghui =

- 李良辉

Deputy Commander of the Jinan Military Region
- In office January 2001 – 2003
- Commander: Chen Bingde

Commander of the Xinjiang Military District
- In office March 1997 – October 2000
- Preceded by: Fu Bingyao
- Succeeded by: Qiu Yanhan

Personal details
- Born: May 1940 (age 86) Shen County, Hebei, China
- Party: Chinese Communist Party
- Education: PLA National Defence University

Military service
- Allegiance: People's Republic of China
- Branch/service: People's Liberation Army Ground Force
- Years of service: 1961–2003
- Rank: Lieutenant general
- Unit: People's Liberation Army Air Force Airborne Corps

Chinese name
- Simplified Chinese: 李良辉
- Traditional Chinese: 李良輝
Transcriptions
Standard Mandarin
- Hanyu Pinyin: Lǐ Liánghuī

Li Lianghui (Chinese: 李良辉; born May 1940) is a lieutenant general in the People's Liberation Army of China. He was a member of the 15th Central Committee of the Chinese Communist Party. He was a member of the Standing Committee of the 10th Chinese People's Political Consultative Conference.

== Biography ==
Li was born in Shen County (now Shenzhou), Hebei, in May 1940. In June 1958, he became an apprentice in the Garage of the Logistics Department of the Beijing Military Region. He enlisted in the People's Liberation Army (PLA) in September 1961, and joined the Chinese Communist Party (CCP) in December 1963. He served in the People's Liberation Army Air Force Airborne Corps for a long time and eventually became its commander in May 1983. In June 1990, he became deputy commander of the Ningxia Military District, rising to commander in July 1993. In March 1997, he was commissioned as deputy commander of the Lanzhou Military Region and commander of the Xinjiang Military District, he remained in that position until October 2000. On 8 September 2000, a vehicle carrying military ammunition and materials was destroyed by the garrison exploded on the Xishan Road in the western suburb of Ürümqi, Xinjiang, killing at least 73 people, injuring more than 300 people, and damaging more than 30 cars and nearby houses. Li and his partner Zhou Yongshun, political commissar of the Xinjiang Military Region, both were removed from office by the Central Military Commission. In January 2001, Li was transferred to the Jinan Military Region and appointed deputy commander, and served until 2003.

He was promoted to the rank of major general (shaojiang) in July 1990 and lieutenant general (zhongjiang) in July 1998.

Military offices
Preceded by Hu Shihao	Commander of the Ningxia Military District; 1993–1997	Succeeded by Lu Puyang
Preceded by Fu Bingyao	Commander of the Xinjiang Military District; 1997–2000	Succeeded by Qiu Yanhan
