= Meng Zhongkang =

Chinese army officer

- 孟中康

Political Commissar of Jiangsu Military District
- In office April 2017 – September 2019
- Preceded by: Cao Dexin
- Succeeded by: Zhang Mengbin

Political Commissar of the 71st Group Army
- In office January 2017 – April 2017
- Preceded by: Zhou Wanzhu
- Succeeded by: Position revoked

Personal details
- Born: April 1961 (age 65) Zhuji, Zhejiang, China
- Party: Chinese Communist Party
- Education: PLA Xi'an Political College; PLA Nanjing Political College; PLA Shijiazhuang Army Command College

Military service
- Allegiance: People's Republic of China
- Branch/service: People's Liberation Army Ground Force
- Years of service: February 1978–2019
- Rank: Major general

Meng Zhongkang (Chinese: 孟中康; pinyin: Mèng Zhōngkāng; born April 1961) is a former Chinese army officer. He holds the rank of major general (Shaojiang) in the People's Liberation Army Ground Force. As of September 2019, he was under investigation by the Central Commission for Discipline Inspection. Previously he served as political commissar of Jiangsu Military District and a member of the Standing Committee of the Jiangsu Provincial Committee of the Chinese Communist Party.

== Career ==
Meng was born in Zhuji, Zhejiang, in April 1961. He graduated from PLA Xi'an Political College, PLA Nanjing Political College, and PLA Shijiazhuang Army Command College. In his early years, he served in the Beijing Military Region. In December 2010, he became director of Political Department of the 82nd Group Army and later became deputy political commissar. He was promoted to the rank of major general (Shaojiang) in July 2012. In January 2014, he was deputy political commissar of Joint Service Department of the Beijing Military Region. In January 2016 he was transferred to Fuzhou, capital of east China's Fujian province, and appointed deputy political commissar of the Eastern Theater Command Army. One year later, he was transferred again to Xuzhou, Jiangsu, where he was appointed political commissar of the 71st Group Army. But having held the position for only three months, he became political commissar of Jiangsu Military District. In January 2018, he was elected a member of the Standing Committee of the Jiangsu Provincial Committee of the Chinese Communist Party.

== Investigation ==
In September 2019, he has been stripped of his posts for "serious legal violations" and was removed from membership of China's highest organ of state power and the national legislature, the National People's Congress.

Military offices
Preceded by Zhou Wanzhu	Political Commissar of the 71st Group Army; 2017–2017	Succeeded by Position revoked
Preceded by Cao Dexin	Political Commissar of Jiangsu Military District; 2017–2019	Succeeded by Zhang Mengbin
