= Cui Yuzhong =

Chinese general

- 崔玉忠

Deputy Commander of the People's Liberation Army Navy
- Incumbent
- Assumed office June 2021
- Commander: Shen Jinlong; Dong Jun

Personal details
- Born: November 1964 (age 61) Hailun County, Heilongjiang, China
- Party: Chinese Communist Party

Military service
- Allegiance: People's Republic of China
- Branch/service: People's Liberation Army Navy
- Years of service: ?–present
- Rank: Vice admiral

Cui Yuzhong (Chinese: 崔玉忠; pinyin: Cuī Yùzhōng; born November 1964) is a vice admiral (zhongjiang) of the People's Liberation Army (PLA), serving as deputy commander of the People's Liberation Army Navy since June 2021. He was a delegate to the 19th National Congress of the Chinese Communist Party and an alternate of the 19th Central Committee of the Chinese Communist Party.

== Biography ==
Cui was born in Hailun County (Hailun), Heilongjiang, in November 1964. He served in the North Sea Fleet before being appointed assistant chief of staff of the People's Liberation Army Navy in July 2013. In March 2016, he was commissioned as deputy commander of the South Sea Fleet, concurrently serving as commander of its Naval Aviation Force, he remained in that positions until July 2016, when he was transferred to East Sea Fleet and assigned to the similar position. In April 2020, he rose to become deputy chief of staff of the People's Liberation Army Navy, and in December, he was despatched to the Eastern Theater Command as deputy commander. In June 2021, he was reassigned to as the People's Liberation Army Navy as deputy commander.

He was promoted to the rank of rear admiral (Shaojiang) in July 2014 and vice admiral (zhongjiang) in December 2020.

Military offices
Preceded by Wang Changjiang	Commander of the Southern Theater Command Naval Aviation Force; 2016	Succeeded by Zhang Xuejun
Preceded by Sun Laishen	Commander of the Eastern Theater Command Naval Aviation Force; 2016–2019	Succeeded by Wei Wenhui (魏文徽)
