= Ma Yiming (lieutenant general) =

- 马宜明

Assistant to the Chief of General Staff of the People's Liberation Army
- In office December 2014 – December 2015
- Preceded by: Gao Jin
- Succeeded by: Position revoked

Chief of Staff of the Jinan Military Region
- In office December 2012 – December 2014
- Preceded by: Zhao Zongqi
- Succeeded by: Zhang Ming

Commander of the 26th Group Army
- In office January 2008 – December 2012
- Preceded by: Zhu Wenyu
- Succeeded by: Tan Min

Personal details
- Born: August 1957 (age 68) Deng County, Henan, China
- Party: Chinese Communist Party

Military service
- Allegiance: People's Republic of China
- Branch/service: People's Liberation Army Ground Force
- Years of service: ?–2020
- Rank: Lieutenant general

Chinese name
- Simplified Chinese: 马宜明
- Traditional Chinese: 馬宜明
Transcriptions
Standard Mandarin
- Hanyu Pinyin: Mǎ Yímíng

Ma Yiming (Chinese: 马宜明; born August 1957) is a lieutenant general in the People's Liberation Army of China.

== Biography ==
Ma was born in Deng County (now Dengzhou), Henan, in August 1957. He was assigned to the 26th Group Army (now 80th Group Army) in 2004. He moved up the ranks to become chief of staff in March 2004 and commander in February 2008. In December 2012, he was made chief of staff of the Jinan Military Region, but having held the position for only two years, then he was promoted to become assistant to the Chief of General Staff of the People's Liberation Army. In January 2016, he was commissioned as assistant chief of staff of the Joint Staff Department of the Central Military Commission, and one year later rose to become deputy chief of staff, serving in the post until his retirement in December 2020.

He was promoted to the rank of major general (shaojiang) in July 2005 and lieutenant general (zhongjiang) in July 2014.

Military offices
Preceded by Zhu Wenyu	Commander of the 26th Group Army; 2008–2012	Succeeded by Tan Min
Preceded by Zhao Zongqi	Chief of Staff of the Jinan Military Region; 2012–2014	Succeeded by Zhang Ming
Preceded by Gao Jin	Assistant to the Chief of General Staff of the People's Liberation Army; 2014–2015	Succeeded by Position revoked
