= Jiangsu Military District =

- 中国人民解放军江苏省军区
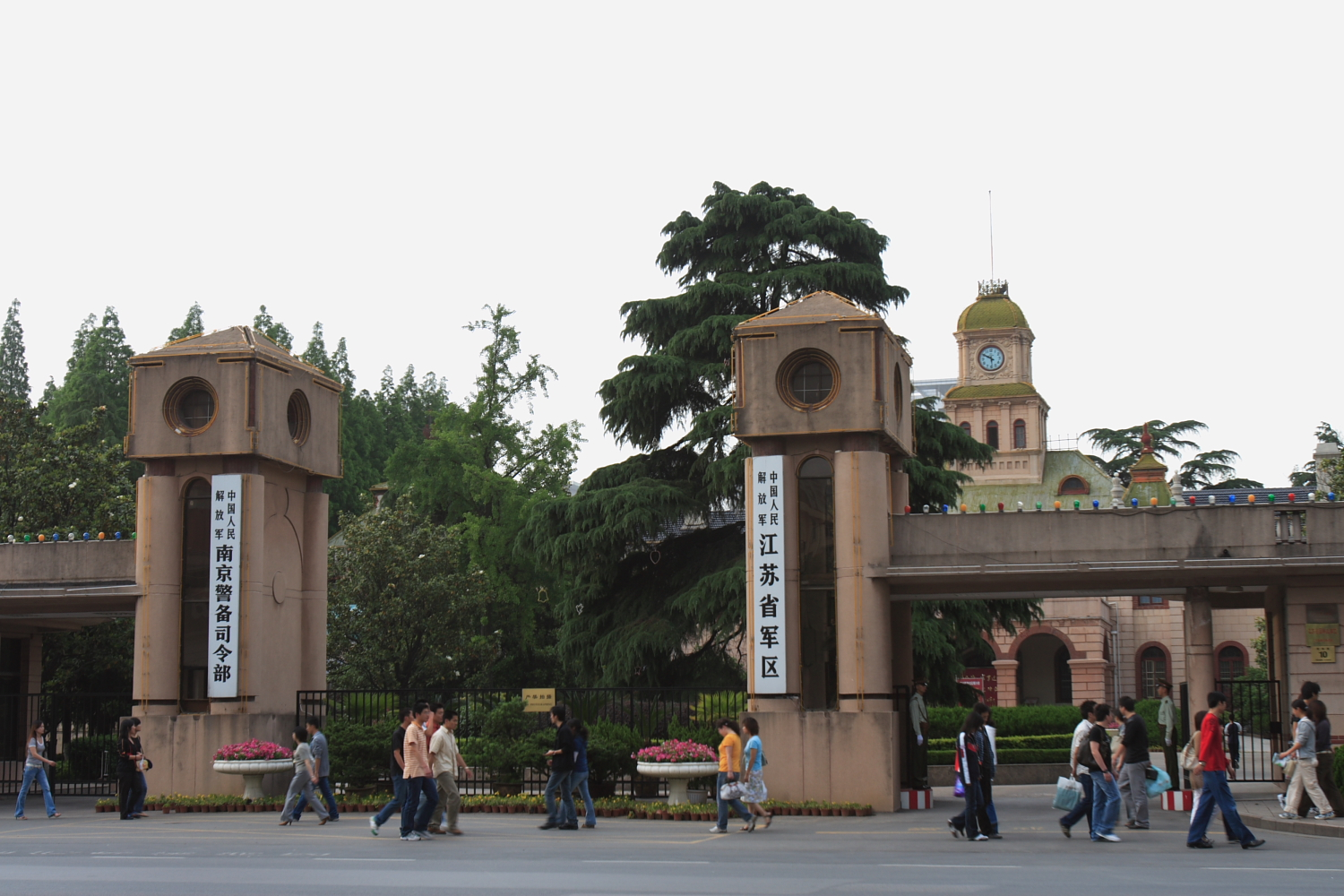
- Jiangsu Military District in Nanjing
- Founded: November 1952; 73 years ago
- Country: China
- Type: Military district
- Role: Command and control
- Part of: People's Liberation Army
- Headquarters: Nanjing, Jiangsu

Commanders
- Commander: Major general (shaojiang) Zhang Lihong
- Political Commisar: Rear admiral (shaojiang) Zhang Guocheng

Chinese name
- Simplified Chinese: 中国人民解放军江苏省军区
- Traditional Chinese: 中國人民解放軍江蘇省軍區
Transcriptions
Standard Mandarin
- Hanyu Pinyin: Zhōngguó Rénmín Jiěfàngjūn Jiāngsūshěng Jūnqū

The Jiangsu Military District (Chinese: 中国人民解放军江苏省军区; full name People's Liberation Army Jiangsu Military District or PLA Jiangsu Military District) is a military district of the National Defense Mobilization Department of the Central Military Commission in China.

== History ==
Jiangsu Military District was established in November 1952.

== Leaders ==
=== Commanders ===
Name (English)	Name (Chinese)	Tenure begins	Tenure ends	Note
Liu Xiansheng	刘先胜	November 1952	October 1960	
Duan Huanjing	段焕竞	November 1960	October 1965	
Zhao Jun	赵俊	October 1965	August 1969	
Huang Chaotian	黄朝天	August 1969	November 1979	
Wang Jingkun	王景昆	November 1979	June 1981	
Lin Yousheng	林有声	June 1981	May 1983	
Zhen Shen	甄申	May 1983	August 1985	
Zhang Zhaoxun	章昭薰	August 1985	March 1992	
Zheng Bingqing	郑炳清	March 1992	September 1997	
Jiang Wenyu	蒋文郁	September 1997	July 2002	
Li Zenglin	李增林	July 2002	December 2002	
Chen Yiyuan	陈一远	July 2003	May 2009	
Xu Yuanchao	许援朝	May 2009	March 2011	
Sun Xinliang	孙心良	March 2011	July 2013	
He Weidong	何卫东	July 2013	February 2014	
Li Kerang	李克让	February 2014	December 2014	
Li Daqing	李大清	January 2015	July 2018	
Yu Zhonghai	于中海	July 2018	December 2019	
Zhang Lihong	张黎鸿	December 2019		

=== Political commissars ===
Name (English)	Name (Chinese)	Tenure begins	Tenure ends	Note
Xiao Wangdong	萧望东	November 1952	February 1954	
Ke Qingshi	柯庆施	February 1954	September 1955	
Jiang Weiqing	江渭清	September 1955	April 1967	
Liang Jiqing	梁辑卿	April 1967	April 1970	
Zhong Guochu	钟国楚	April 1970	February 1977	
Xu Jiatun	许家屯	February 1977	April 1983	
Han Peixin	韩培信	April 1983	August 1985	
Yue Dewang	岳德旺	May 1983	June 1990	
Wei Chang'an	魏长安	June 1990	August 1998	
Ren Chaohai	任朝海	August 1998	October 2002	
Wu Qi	吴齐	October 2002	November 2006	
Li Duxin	李笃信	November 2006	December 2014	
Cao Dexin	曹德信	December 2014	April 2017	
Meng Zhongkang	孟中康	April 2017	September 2019	
Zhang Mengbin	张孟滨	January 2021	January 2023	
Zhang Guocheng	张国成	January 2023		
