= Xu Zhongbo =

Chinese general

- 徐忠波

Political Commissar of the People's Liberation Army Rocket Force
- In office July 2020 – July 2023
- Preceded by: Wang Jiasheng
- Succeeded by: Xu Xisheng

Personal details
- Born: October 1960 (age 65) Rushan, Shandong, China
- Party: Chinese Communist Party

Military service
- Allegiance: People's Republic of China
- Branch/service: People's Liberation Army Rocket Force (2020–2023); People's Liberation Army Ground Force (1978–2020)
- Years of service: 1978–2023
- Rank: General

Xu Zhongbo (Chinese: 徐忠波; pinyin: Xú Zhōngbō; born October 1960) is a general in the People's Liberation Army of China, served as political commissar of the People's Liberation Army Rocket Force from 2020 to 2023. He is an alternate of the 19th Central Committee of the Chinese Communist Party. He is a delegate to the 19th National Congress of the Chinese Communist Party.

== Biography ==
Xu was born in Rushan, Weihai, Shandong province in October 1960. He enlisted in the People's Liberation Army in March 1978. He served in the 20th Group Army since December 2003, what he was eventually promoted to political commissar in 2013. In October 2014, he was appointed political commissar of the 83rd Group Army, taking over from Xu Yuanlin. In February 2016, he became political commissar of the Western Theater Command Ground Force. In December 2017, he became political commissar of the Joint Logistics Support Force of the Central Military Commission, a position he held until July 2020, when he was promoted to become political commissar of the People's Liberation Army Rocket Force.

He was promoted to the rank of major general (Shaojiang) in 2010, lieutenant general (zhongjiang) in July 2017, and general (Shangjiang) in July 2020.

Military offices
Preceded by Yang Yuwen	Political Commissar of the 20th Group Army; 2012–2014	Succeeded by Xue Jun
Preceded by Xu Yuanlin	Political Commissar of the 83rd Group Army; 2014–2016	Succeeded by Gao Wei
New title	Political Commissar of the Western Theater Command Ground Force; 2016–2017	Succeeded by Xu Deqing
New title	Political Commissar of the Joint Logistics Support Force of the Central Military Commission; 2017–2020	Succeeded by Wang Wenquan
Preceded by Wang Jiasheng	Political Commissar of the People's Liberation Army Rocket Force; 2020–2023	Succeeded by Xu Xisheng
