= Zheng Bingqing =

Chinese politician (1937–2024)

Lieutenant General Zheng Bingqing (November 1937 - June 13, 2024, Chinese: 郑炳清), a native of Putian County (now Putian City), Fujian, served as a member of the People's Liberation Army.

== Biography ==
He enlisted in the People's Liberation Army (PLA) in 1953 and subsequently joined the Chinese Communist Party (CCP) in 1956. He held various positions, including deputy minister and section chief of the Operations Department of the Fuzhou Military Region Command, deputy chief of staff of the Nanjing Military Region, and commander of the Jiangsu Military District. He was promoted to the position of lieutenant general in 1997 after being granted the rank of major general in 1988.

Zheng Bingqing was also a member of the 10th National Committee of the Chinese People's Political Consultative Conference and a delegate to the 8th and 9th National People's Congresses.

He died in Nanjing on June 13, 2024, at the age of 87.

Military offices
Preceded by Zhang Zhaoxun	Commander of the Jiangsu Military District; 1992–1997	Succeeded by Jiang Wenyu
