= 76th Group Army =

- 第七十六集团军
- Active: 1949–present
- Country: People's Republic of China
- Allegiance: Chinese Communist Party
- Branch: People's Liberation Army Ground Force
- Type: Group army
- Part of: Western Theater Command Ground Force
- Garrison/HQ: Xining, Qinghai
- Engagements: Long March; Second Sino-Japanese War; World War II; Chinese Civil War; Korean War

Commanders
- Political Commissar: Major General Yuan Honggang
- Notable commanders: Peng Xuefeng; Wei Guoqing; Zhang Zhen

Insignia
- NATO Map Symbol

The 76th Group Army (Chinese: 第七十六集团军; pinyin: Dì Qīshíliù Jítuánjūn), Unit 31665, formerly the 21st Group Army, is a military formation of the Chinese People's Liberation Army Ground Force (PLAGF). The 76th Group Army is one of thirteen total group armies of the PLAGF, the largest echelon of ground forces in the People's Republic of China, and one of two assigned to the nation's Western Theater Command.

== History ==
The unit served during the Korean War when it comprised the 61st, 62nd, and 63rd Divisions.

In 2022, the 12th Combined Arms Brigade was reorganized and entirely transferred to the People's Liberation Army Rocket Force.

== Organization ==
- 12th Heavy Combined-Arms brigade - Stationed in Jiuquan, Gansu
- 17th Heavy Combined-Arms Brigade
- 56th Light Combined-Arms Brigade
- 62nd Heavy Combined-Arms Brigade
- 149th Heavy Combined-Arms Brigade
- 182nd Light Combined-Arms Brigade
- 76th Special Operations Brigade
- 76th Army Aviation Brigade
- 76th Artillery Brigade
- 76th Air Defense Brigade
- 76th Engineering and Chemical Defense Brigade
- 76th Service Support Brigade
