= Zhang Xudong =

Chinese army general (1962–2021)

- 张旭东

Commander of the Western Theater Command
- In office December 2020 – June 2021
- Preceded by: Zhao Zongqi
- Succeeded by: Xu Qiling

Personal details
- Born: November 1962 Qian'an, Hebei, China
- Died: October 1, 2021 (aged 58) Beijing, China
- Party: Chinese Communist Party
- Occupation: Military officer

Military service
- Allegiance: People's Republic of China
- Branch/service: People's Liberation Army Ground Force
- Years of service: 1981–2021
- Rank: General
- Commands: Western Theater Command

Chinese name
- Traditional Chinese: 張旭東
- Simplified Chinese: 张旭东
Transcriptions
Standard Mandarin
- Hanyu Pinyin: Zhāng Xùdōng

Zhang Xudong (Chinese: 张旭东; November 1962 – 1 October 2021) was a general (Shangjiang) of the People's Liberation Army (PLA) of China. He was commander of the Western Theater Command. He was promoted to the rank of major general (shaojiang) in July 2012, lieutenant general (zhongjiang) in July 2018, and general (Shangjiang) in December 2020.

== Biography ==
Zhang was born in Qian'an, Tangshan, Hebei province in 1962. He enlisted in the People's Liberation Army in September 1981 and joined the Chinese Communist Party in August 1984. He served in Shenyang Military Region for a long time. He once served as chief of staff of the 39th Army Group Army. In February 2014, he succeeded Pan Liangshi as commander of the 39th Army Group Army. In March 2017, he was appointed deputy commander of the Central Theater Command and commander of the Central Theater Command Ground Force. On October 1, 2019, he was deputy commander in chief of the 70th anniversary of the People's Republic of China. In December 2020, he became commander of the Western Theater Command, succeeding Zhao Zongqi, during the 2020–2021 China–India skirmishes.

Zhang died on 1 October 2021, from cold conditions while deployed with his troops near the Line of Actual Control.

Military offices
Preceded by Pan Liangshi	Commander of the 39th Army Group Army; 2014–2017	Succeeded by Position revoked
Preceded by Shi Luze	Commander of the Central Theater Command Ground Force; 2017–2017	Succeeded by Fan Chengcai
Preceded by Zhao Zongqi	Commanding Officer of the Western Theater Command; 2020–2021	Succeeded by Xu Qiling
