= Wang Changjiang =

Chinese Army officer (born 1959)

- 王长江

Chief of Staff of the Central Theater Command
- Incumbent
- Assumed office April 2019
- Preceded by: Li Fengbiao

Personal details
- Born: February 1959 (age 67) Luan County, Hebei, China
- Party: Chinese Communist Party
- Education: Shijiazhuang Flight College of the PLA Air Force

Military service
- Allegiance: People's Republic of China
- Branch/service: People's Liberation Army Navy
- Years of service: 1977–present
- Rank: Vice admiral

Chinese name
- Simplified Chinese: 王长江
- Traditional Chinese: 王長江
Transcriptions
Standard Mandarin
- Hanyu Pinyin: Wáng Chángjiāng

Wang Changjiang (Chinese: 王长江; born February 1959) is a vice admiral (zhongjiang) of the People's Liberation Army (PLA) who has been deputy commander and chief of staff of the Central Theater Command. He is a delegate to the 13th National People's Congress.

== Biography ==
Wang was born in Luan County (now Luanzhou), Hebei, in February 1959. He enlisted in the People's Liberation Army in 1977. He graduated from the PLA Air Force Fourth Aviation School (now Shijiazhuang Flight College of the PLA Air Force). He once was commander of the Sea and Air Eagle Regiment. He served numerous leadership positions in the East Sea Fleet and South Sea Fleet. In 2016, he was given the position of deputy commander of the North Theater Command, he remained in that position until April 2019, when he was transferred to Central Theater Command and commissioned as deputy commander and chief of staff.

He was promoted to the rank of rear admiral (Shaojiang) in 2008 and vice admiral (zhongjiang) in 2017.

Military offices
Preceded by Zhang Hanbao (张汉保)	Commander of the Southern Theater Command Naval Aviation Force; 2012–2016	Succeeded by Cui Yuzhong
Preceded by Li Fengbiao	Chief of Staff of the Central Theater Command; 2019–present	Incumbent
