= He Weidong =

Chinese general and politician (born 1957)

- 何卫东
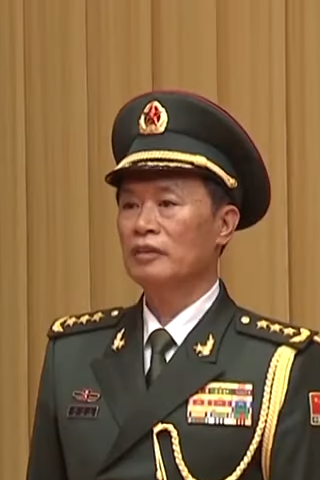

Vice Chairman of the Central Military Commission
- In office Party Commission: 23 October 2022 – 17 October 2025; State Commission: 11 March 2023 – 28 October 2025 Serving with Zhang Youxia
- Chairman: Xi Jinping
- Preceded by: Xu Qiliang
- Succeeded by: Zhang Shengmin

Commander of the Eastern Theater Command
- In office December 2019 – January 2022
- Preceded by: Liu Yuejun
- Succeeded by: Lin Xiangyang

Commander of the Western Theater Command Ground Force
- In office February 2016 – December 2019
- Preceded by: New title
- Succeeded by: Xu Qiling

Commander of the Shanghai Garrison Command
- In office March 2014 – February 2016
- Preceded by: Peng Shuigen
- Succeeded by: Zhang Xiaoming

Commander of the Jiangsu Military District
- In office July 2013 – March 2014
- Preceded by: Sun Xinliang
- Succeeded by: Li Kerang

Personal details
- Born: May 1957 (age 69) Nanping, Fujian, China
- Party: Chinese Communist Party (expelled in 2025)
- Education: PLA Nanjing Army Command College; National University of Defense Technology

Military service
- Allegiance: People's Republic of China
- Branch/service: People's Liberation Army Ground Force
- Years of service: 1972–2025
- Rank: General (stripped 2025)
- Commands: Eastern Theater Command

Chinese name
- Traditional Chinese: 何衛東
- Simplified Chinese: 何卫东
Transcriptions
Standard Mandarin
- Hanyu Pinyin: Hé Wèidōng

He Weidong (Chinese: 何卫东; born May 1957) is a former general of the People's Liberation Army (PLA) who served as the Vice Chairman of the Central Military Commission of the Chinese Communist Party and member of the 20th Politburo of the Chinese Communist Party from October 2022 until his removal on 17 October 2025.

He served as commander of the Eastern Theater Command from 2019 to 2022. He was promoted to the rank of major general in July 2008, lieutenant general in July 2017 and general in December 2019. He was considered to have been a part of the Fujian clique of the Xi Jinping faction within the CCP.

He was dismissed from his position of Vice Chairman of the Central Military Commission sometime during 2025; expelled from the Chinese Communist Party and the People's Liberation Army on 17 October 2025. He was replaced by Zhang Shengmin.

== Education ==
He was born in Nanping, Fujian, with ancestry from the town of Xuhe, in Dongtai, Jiangsu in May 1957. In 1981 he graduated from PLA Nanjing Army Command College. In 2001 he entered the National University of Defense Technology.

== Military career ==
He enlisted in the People's Liberation Army (PLA) in December 1972 after middle school. He was Commander of Jiangsu Military District in July 2013 and Shanghai Garrison Command in March 2014. In February 2015 he succeeded Zhu Shengling as a member of the Standing Committee of the Shanghai Municipal Committee of the Chinese Communist Party. In July 2016 he was transferred to Deputy Commander of the Western Theater Command and Commander of the Western Theater Command Ground Force. On 24 February 2018, he was elected as a deputy to the 13th National People's Congress. In September 2019, he was promoted to become Commander of the Eastern Theater Command, replacing Liu Yuejun.

=== Vice Chairman of the Central Military Commission ===
In October 2022, Zhang was named as a member of the Politburo of the Chinese Communist Party and the second-ranking vice chairman of the CCP Central Military Commission. He also became the vice chairman of the state CMC in March 2023.

In January 2024, at the annual meeting of the disciplinary inspectors of the PLA, He said the military should "adhere to a strict tone, use stricter standards to scrutinize the key few, and show determination to get to the bottom of long-standing [corruption] problems". He also called on the CMC Commission for Discipline Inspection to maintain loyalty and support to CCP General Secretary Xi Jinping. In March, during a discussion with a PLA delegation, He called on crackdowns on "fake combat capabilities".

== Downfall ==
In April 2025, the Financial Times reported that he had been arrested, placed under anti-corruption investigations and was removed from his post as vice chairman of the Central Military Commission. At the funeral of the former Vice Chairman of the Central Military Commission Xu Qiliang on 7 June 2025, no wreath from him was present, sparking speculation on whether he was removed from his post. On 17 October 2025, the Ministry of National Defense announced that he was expelled from the CCP and the PLA for "serious violations of discipline and law". He was replaced by Zhang Shengmin. His removal as the first-ranked CMC Vice Chairman was the first since Zhao Ziyang, also a CCP General Secretary, after the 1989 Tiananmen Square protests and massacre.

He, along with eight other senior military officials, were investigated and punished for "serious violations of party, discipline, and law" and "suspected of major duty-related crimes". A spokesperson for the Defense Ministry stated that the violations involved "exceptionally large amounts of money" and were of an "extremely serious nature and with extremely negative impacts". Reports indicated that Weidong's expulsion was also linked to accusations of political disloyalty and personal misconduct described by official sources as "loss of chastity," suggesting violations of party discipline beyond financial corruption.

On 27 December 2025, Weidong was disqualified as a deputy to the National People's Congress along four other military officers including He Hongjun, Wang Peng, Wang Renhua and Zhang Hongbing.

His removal, along with that of Miao Hua, is believed to be a part of factional struggles within the CCP. Weidong belonged to Xi Jinping's "Fujian clique", while Zhang Youxia led the "Shaanxi clique". The removal of He and Miao from the CMC during the spring and summer of 2025, is believed to be a massive shakeup in the balance of power by Zhang. Zhang himself fell from power in January 2026, when he was arrested and put under investigation for corruption.

== See also ==
- Officials implicated by the anti-corruption campaign in China (2022–)

Military offices
Preceded by Sun Xinliang (孙心良)	Commander of the Jiangsu Military District; 2013–2014	Succeeded by Li Kerang (李克让)
Preceded by Peng Shuigen (彭水根)	Commander of the Shanghai Garrison Command; 2014–2016	Succeeded by Zhang Xiaoming (张晓明)
New title	Commander of the Western Theater Command Ground Force; 2016–2019	Succeeded by Xu Qiling
Preceded by Liu Yuejun	Commander of the Eastern Theater Command; 2019–2022	Succeeded by Lin Xiangyang
Political offices
Preceded by Xu Qiliang	Vice Chairman of the Central Military Commission; 2022–2025; Served alongside: Zhang Youxia	Succeeded by Zhang Shengmin
