= 1st Garrison Division of Lanzhou Military Region (3rd Formation) =

62nd Division (1949–58) 62nd Infantry Division (1958–60) 62nd Army Division (1960-85) 1st Garrison Division of Lanzhou Military Region (1985–92)
- Active: 1949.2 - 1992.10
- Country: People's Republic of China
- Branch: People's Liberation Army
- Type: Division
- Role: Infantry, Garrison
- Part of: 21st Army Corps, Lanzhou Military Region
- Engagements: Chinese Civil War, Korean War

The 62nd Division (Chinese: 第62师) was created in February 1949 under the Regulation of the Redesignations of All Organizations and Units of the Army, issued by Central Military Commission on November 1, 1948, basing on the 5th Division, 2nd Column of the Huadong Field Army. Its history could be traced to the 5th Brigade, 4th Column of Eighth Route Army formed in July 1947.

The division was a part of 21st Corps. Under the flag of the 62nd Division took part several major battles during the Chinese Civil War.

In March 1953, the division entered Korea as a part of People's Volunteer Army. During its deployment in Korea, it took part in the Battle of Kumsong. In August 1958, the division returned from Korea and renamed as 62nd Infantry Division(Chinese: 步兵第62师).

The division was then composed of:

- 184th Infantry Regiment;
- 185th Infantry Regiment;
- 186th Infantry Regiment;
- 342nd Artillery Regiment.

In April 1960, the division was renamed as 62nd Army Division(Chinese: 陆军第62师).

In November, the division detached from the Corps and was put under direct control of Lanzhou Military Region, and exchanged its 184th Infantry Regiment with 181st Infantry Regiment from 61st Army Division.

In February 1967, the division returned to 21st Army Corps' control after 21st's redeployment to Lanzhou Military Region.

In December 1969, 342nd Artillery Regiment was renamed as Artillery Regiment, 62nd Army Division.

In late 1975, 181st and 184th Infantry Regiments returned to their parent units.

In 1985, the division was re-organized and renamed as 1st Garrison Division of Lanzhou Military Region(Chinese: 兰州军区守备第1师)(3rd formation). By then, the division was composed of:

- 1st Garrison Regiment (former 184th Infantry);
- 2nd Garrison Regiment (former 185th Infantry);
- 3rd Garrison Regiment (former 186th Infantry);
- Artillery Regiment.

In October 1992, the division was disbanded and reduced as Independent Infantry Regiment of Ningxia Military District(Chinese: 宁夏军区独立步兵团).
