= Wu Shezhou =

General of the Chinese People's Liberation Army Ground Force

- 吴社洲

Political Commissar of the Western Theater Command
- In office January 2017 – June 2021
- Preceded by: Zhu Fuxi
- Succeeded by: Li Fengbiao

Personal details
- Born: 1958 (age 67–68) Hanchuan, Hubei, China
- Party: Chinese Communist Party

Military service
- Allegiance: People's Republic of China
- Branch/service: People's Liberation Army Ground Force
- Years of service: ?−2021
- Rank: General

Wu Shezhou (simplified Chinese: 吴社洲; traditional Chinese: 吳社洲; pinyin: Wú Shèzhōu; born 1958) is a general of the Chinese People's Liberation Army Ground Force. He was the Political Commissar of the Western Theater Command from 2017 to 2021.

== Biography ==
Wu Shezhou was born in Hanchuan, Hubei Province in 1958, and served in the Guangzhou Military Region for most of his career.

He served as Deputy Director of the Political Department of the Guangzhou MR until late 2012, when we was appointed Political Commissar of the Joint Logistics Department of the Guangzhou MR. In late 2014, he was transferred to the Jinan Military Region to serve as its Director of the Political Department, succeeding Jiang Yong (姜勇). During Central Military Commission chairman Xi Jinping's military reform, in early 2016 Wu was appointed Political Commissar of the Ground Force of the newly established Central Theater Command, and concurrently as Deputy Political Commissar of the Central TC. In July he was awarded the rank of lieutenant general.

In January 2017 Wu was promoted to Political Commissar of the strategic Western Theater Command, replacing General Zhu Fuxi. It was an unusual move because at the age of 61, Zhu had not reached the retirement age of 65 for an officer of his rank. At the time of his appointment Wu was the youngest of the ten top officers of China's five theater commands.

On August 20, 2021, he was appointed vice chairperson of the National People's Congress Ethnic Affairs Committee.

In October 2017, he was elected as a member of the 19th Central Committee of the Chinese Communist Party.

Military offices
Preceded by Shi Baohua	Political Commissar of Hubei Military District; 2011–2012	Succeeded by Chen Damin
Preceded by Jiang Yong	Director of Political Department of Jinan Military Region; 2014–2015	Succeeded by Position revoked
New title	Political Commissar of the Central Theater Command Ground Force; 2016–2017	Succeeded by Zhou Wanzhu
Preceded by Zhu Fuxi	Political Commissar of the Western Theater Command; 2017–2021	Succeeded by Li Fengbiao
