= Gao Jin =

General of the Chinese People's Liberation Army

General Gao Jin
- 高津

Director of the CMC Logistic Support Department
- In office April 2019 – January 2022
- Preceded by: Song Puxuan
- Succeeded by: Zhang Lin

Commander of the PLA Strategic Support Force
- In office January 2016 – April 2019
- Preceded by: New position
- Succeeded by: Li Fengbiao

President of the PLA Academy of Military Science
- In office December 2014 – January 2016
- Preceded by: Liu Chengjun
- Succeeded by: Cai Yingting

Assistant to the Chief of General Staff of the People's Liberation Army
- In office July 2014 – December 2014
- Preceded by: Yi Xiaoguang
- Succeeded by: Ma Yiming

Chief of Staff of the Second Artillery Corps
- In office December 2011 – July 2014
- Preceded by: Lu Fu'en
- Succeeded by: Lu Fu'en

Personal details
- Born: April 1959 (age 67) Jingjiang, Jiangsu, China
- Party: Chinese Communist Party
- Education: Second Artillery Command College

Military service
- Allegiance: China
- Branch/service: PLA Rocket Force; PLA Strategic Support Force
- Years of service: 1978–2022
- Rank: General
- Commands: PLA Strategic Support Force; PLA Academy of Military Science

Gao Jin (Chinese: 高津; pinyin: Gāo Jīn; born April 1959) is a general of the Chinese People's Liberation Army (PLA). Since April 2019, he has served as Director of the Logistic Support Department of the Central Military Commission. Prior to that, he served as the inaugural commander of the PLA Strategic Support Force from 2016 to 2019, President of the PLA Academy of Military Science, and Chief of Staff of the Second Artillery Corps, where he spent most of his career.

== Biography ==
Gao Jin was born in Jingjiang, Taizhou, Jiangsu province in 1959, to parents who were both PLA soldiers. He joined the PLA in 1978 without telling his family, and spent most of his career in the Second Artillery Corps, China's strategic missile force.

Gao entered the Second Artillery Command College in 1985, and graduated with a master's degree in engineering. Reportedly a battalion commander of the 815th Brigade, of what was, at that time, the PLA's Second Artillery Corps. This unit was reportedly involved in the firing of DF-15 ballistic missiles in the Third Taiwan Strait Crisis and would become this unit's commander in 1997. He then rose through the ranks of the Second Artillery Corps, becoming deputy chief of staff of what was then Base 52 (now Base 61 of the People's Liberation Army Rocket Force) in 2001, chief of staff of Base 52 in 2007 and overall commander in 2009, eventually becoming chief of staff of the Second Artillery Corps in December 2011. In 2012, he was elected an alternate member of the 18th Central Committee of the Chinese Communist Party (2012–2017). He was made a lieutenant general (zhongjiang) in July 2013.

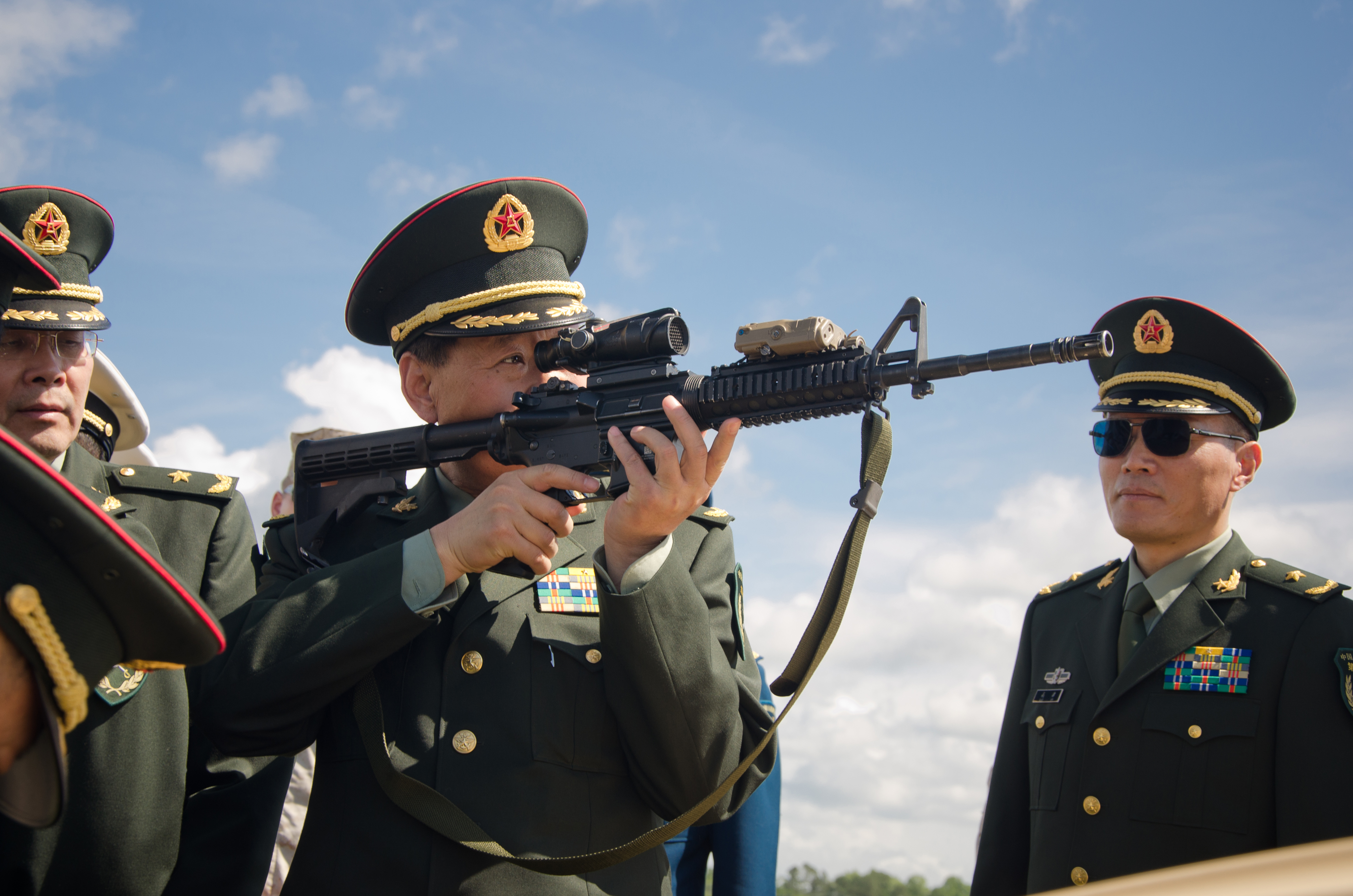
Gao (in sunglasses) alongside other military generals touring several U.S. military installations, May 2012

He was promoted twice in 2014, first to assistant chief of the PLA General Staff Department in July, and on December 22, he became President of the PLA Academy of Military Science, the PLA's top research institute, enjoying the same rank as the commanders of the PLA's seven military regions. At age 55, he became the youngest regional chief-level commander of the PLA. He succeeded General Liu Chengjun, who had reached retirement age. On December 31, 2015, as part of wide-ranging reforms of the People's Liberation Army, Gao was named first commander of the PLA Strategic Support Force. On July 28, 2017, Gao was promoted to the rank of General.

Gao has published many academic articles, and has won technological and military awards. The Communist Party mouthpiece People's Daily has praised him as a "technologically powerful military leader."

On 2 March 2026, the fifteenth meeting of the Standing Committee of the 14th National Committee of the Chinese People's Political Consultative Conference (CPPCC) adopted a decision to revoke Gao's membership in the 14th National Committee of the CPPCC and to remove him from his positions as a member of the Standing Committee of the 14th CPPCC National Committee.

Military offices
Preceded by Lu Fu'en	Chief of Staff of the Second Artillery Corps; 2011–2014	Succeeded by Lu Fu'en
Preceded by Yi Xiaoguang	Assistant to the Chief of General Staff of the People's Liberation Army; 2014	Succeeded by Ma Yiming
Preceded by Liu Chengjun	President of the PLA Academy of Military Science; 2014–2016	Succeeded by Cai Yingting
New title	Commander of the People's Liberation Army Strategic Support Force; 2015–2019	Succeeded by Li Fengbiao
Preceded by Song Puxuan	Director of the Logistic Support Department of the Central Military Commission; 2019–2022	Succeeded by Zhang Lin
