= Ju Qiansheng =

Chinese military officer

- 巨乾生

Commander of the People's Liberation Army Strategic Support Force
- In office June 2021 – 19 April 2024
- Preceded by: Li Fengbiao

Personal details
- Born: May 1962 (age 64) Baoji, Shaanxi, China
- Party: Chinese Communist Party
- Education: Xidian University

Military service
- Allegiance: People's Republic of China
- Branch/service: People's Liberation Army Strategic Support Force
- Rank: General

Ju Qiansheng (Chinese: 巨乾生; pinyin: Jù Qiánshēng; born May 1962) is a general (Shangjiang) of the People's Liberation Army (PLA). He served as the commander of the People's Liberation Army Strategic Support Force from 2021 to 2024.

== Biography ==
Born in Baoji, Shaanxi, in May 1962, Ju graduated from Xidian University. He was commander of the Network System Department of the People's Liberation Army Strategic Support Force. In June 2021, he was promoted to become commander of the People's Liberation Army Strategic Support Force.

He was promoted to the rank of lieutenant general (zhongjiang) in July 2019 and general (Shangjiang) in July 2021. On 28 August 2026, the Standing Committee of the National People's Congress removed Ju as a delegate to the 14th National People's Congress.

Military offices
Preceded by Li Fengbiao	Commander of the People's Liberation Army Strategic Support Force; 2021–2024	Next: Post abolished
