= Wang Zhibin =

- 汪志斌

Secretary of the Discipline Inspection Commission of the People's Liberation Army Rocket Force
- In office December 2023 – October 2025

Personal details
- Born: February 1963 (age 63) Pengze County, Jiangxi, China
- Party: Chinese Communist Party (expelled in 2025)
- Education: Pengze County No.1 High School

Military service
- Allegiance: People's Republic of China
- Branch/service: People's Liberation Army Ground Force
- Years of service: ?–2025
- Rank: Lieutenant general

Wang Zhibin (Chinese: 汪志斌; pinyin: Wāng Zhìbīn; born February 1963) is a lieutenant general in the People's Liberation Army of China. He is a delegate to the 14th National People's Congress.

== Biography ==
Wang was born in Pengze County, Jiangxi, in February 1963. He attended Pengze County No.1 High School.

Wang held a series of command and political roles over his long-standing career, which began in the former Nanjing Military Region. His postings have included company commander, political instructor, regimental political department director, regiment commander, regiment political commissar, and brigade political commissar. He later served as commander of the Xuancheng Military Sub-district under the Anhui Military District and as political commissar of the 13th Coastal Defense Division of the Fujian Military District.

In 2015, Wang was appointed director of the Political Department of the 1st Group Army. By March 2017, he assumed the role of director of the Political Work Department of the 73rd Group Army. In April 2018, he was promoted to political commissar of the 81st Group Army. Additionally, he was involved in disaster relief efforts, having directed flood prevention and rescue operations in Anqing, Anhui.

In March 2022, Wang was elevated to the position of political commissar of the Western Theater Command Ground Force. In December 2023, he was appointed secretary of the Discipline Inspection Commission of the People's Liberation Army Rocket Force.

Wang was promoted to the rank of major general (shaojiang) in July 2016 and lieutenant general (zhongjiang) in March 2022.

== Downfall ==
On 18 July 2025, Wang was deprived of his qualification as a delegate to the 14th National People's Congress due to "serious violations of laws and regulations".

Military offices
Preceded by Fang Yongxiang	Director of the Political Department of the 1st Group Army; 2016–2017	Succeeded by Position revoked
Preceded by Fang Yongxiang	Political Commissar of the 81st Group Army; 2018–2022	Succeeded by Ma Baochuan
Preceded by Xu Deqing	Political Commissar of the Western Theater Command Ground Force; 2022–2023	Succeeded by Zheng Yanpo
