= Embassy of China, Dar es Salaam =

Diplomatic mission of China to Tanzania

Embassy of the People's Republic of China in Tanzania
- Location: Dar es Salaam, Tanzania
- Address: No 2 Kajificheni Close, Dar es Salaam, Tanzania
- Coordinates: 6°47′02″S 39°17′11″E
- Ambassador: Chen Mingjian
- Website: Chinese Embassy - Dar es Salaam

The Embassy of the People's Republic of China in Tanzania is the diplomatic mission of China to Tanzania.

== See also ==
- Embassy of Tanzania, Beijing
