= Huang Xinting =

Lieutenant general in the People's Liberation Army (1913–2006)

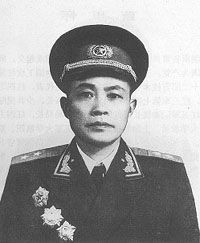
Huang Xinting (1955).

Huang Xinting (Chinese: 黄新廷; October 4, 1913 – May 12, 2006) was a People's Liberation Army lieutenant general. He was born in what is now part of Honghu in Hubei Province. He died in Beijing. He was a member of the National Defense Commission, before its January 1975 disbandment. From October 1975 until May 1984, when command devolved to the general staff of the People's Liberation Army, he commanded the Armoured Force. He was an alternate member of the 11th Central Committee of the Chinese Communist Party from August 1977 to September 1982 and a member of the 12th Central Committee of the Chinese Communist Party from September 1982 to September 1985. He was a member of the Central Advisory Commission from September 1985 until its October 1992 disbandment.

He a delegate to the 3rd National People's Congress.
