= Ningxia Military District =

- 中国人民解放军宁夏军区
- Founded: November 1949; 75 years ago
- Country: People's Republic of China
- Allegiance: Chinese Communist Party
- Type: Military district
- Role: Command and control
- Part of: People's Liberation Army
- Headquarters: Yinchuan, Ningxia

Commanders
- Commander: Rear admiral (shaojiang) Che Yongzhe
- Political Commisar: Major general (shaojiang) Guo Jianjun

Chinese name
- Simplified Chinese: 中国人民解放军宁夏军区
- Traditional Chinese: 中國人民解放軍寧夏軍區
Transcriptions
Standard Mandarin
- Hanyu Pinyin: Zhōngguó Rénmín Jiěfàngjūn Níngxià Jūnqū

The Ningxia Military District (Chinese: 中国人民解放军宁夏军区; full name People's Liberation Army Ningxia Military District or PLA Ningxia Military District) is a military district of the National Defense Mobilization Department of the Central Military Commission in China.

== History ==
Ningxia Military District was established in November 1949.

== Leaders ==
=== Commanders ===
Name (English)	Name (Chinese)	Tenure begins	Tenure ends	Note
Yang Dezhi	杨得志	November 1949	January 1950	
Wang Daobang	王道邦	February 1950	August 1952	
Ma Dunjing (1906–1972)	马惇靖	August 1952	June 1954	
Che Huadong	牛化东	July 1956	January 1958	
Zhu Shengda	朱声达	February 1958	September 1968	
Zhang Guijin	张桂金	September 1968	June 1970	
Jiang Yu'an	姜玉安	June 1970	June 1972	
Gao Rui	高锐	June 1972	September 1975	
Huang Jingyao	黄经耀	January 1977	May 1981	
Chen Ruyi	陈如意	May 1981	May 1983	
Liu Xueji	刘学基	May 1983	June 1990	
Hu Shihao	胡世浩	June 1990	June 1993	
Li Lianghui	李良辉	July 1993	March 1997	
Lu Puyang	卢普阳	March 1997	January 2002	
Chang Guixiang	常贵祥	January 2002	May 2005	
Chen Erxi	陈二曦	May 2005	September 2010	
Tian Minzhou	田民洲	September 2010	May 2011	
Chang Yeting	昌业廷	May 2011	July 2016	
Zheng Weibo	郑威波	2017	December 2020	
Zhao Jianhong	赵建宏	December 2020	April 2024	
Che Yongzhe	车永哲	April 2024		

=== Political commissars ===
Name (English)	Name (Chinese)	Tenure begins	Tenure ends	Note
Pan Zili	潘自力	November 1949	October 1951	
Zhu Min	朱敏	September 1952	May 1953	
Huang Luobin	黄罗斌	May 1953	August 1954	
Liang Dajun	梁大钧	July 1956	January 1958	
Liu Deyuan	刘德元	August 1956	January 1958	
Wang Feng	汪锋	October 1958	May 1961	
Liu Geping	刘格平	March 1959	January 1961	
Yang Jingren	杨静仁	May 1961	March 1970	
Zhang Guijin	张桂金	May 1961	March 1963	
Kang Jianmin	康健民	March 1970	January 1977	
Lin Shan	林山	July 1975	March 1983	
Huo Shilian	霍士廉	January 1977	February 1979	
Li Xuezhi	李学智	1979	August 1985	
Zhao Min	赵敏	May 1983	August 1985	
Wang Huanmin	王焕民	August 1985	June 1990	
Dong Daosheng	董道圣	June 1990	July 1993	
Wang Yongzheng	王永正	July 1993	December 2000	
Yang Jinling	杨金岭	December 2000	December 2006	
Liu Guoxiang	刘国祥	January 2007	August 2010	
Wang Zhihong	王志宏	August 2010	July 2014	
Pan Wujun	潘武俊	July 2014	June 2022	
Guo Jianjun	郭建军	June 2022		
