= Zhu Fuxi =

- 朱福熙

Political Commissar of the Western Theater Command
- In office February 2016 – January 2017
- Preceded by: New position
- Succeeded by: Wu Shezhou

Political Commissar of the Chengdu Military Region
- In office November 2012 – February 2016
- Preceded by: Tian Xiusi
- Succeeded by: Position abolished

Personal details
- Born: July 2, 1955 (age 70) Linhai, Zhejiang
- Party: Chinese Communist Party

Military service
- Allegiance: People's Republic of China
- Branch/service: People's Liberation Army Ground Force
- Years of service: 1974–present
- Rank: General

Zhu Fuxi (Chinese: 朱福熙; pinyin: Zhū Fúxī; born July 2, 1955) is a general (shang jiang) of the Chinese People's Liberation Army (PLA). He served as the inaugural Political Commissar of the Western Theater Command, and the last Commissar of the Chengdu Military Region.

== Biography ==
Zhu was born in Linhai, Zhejiang province. In 2002 he was named head of the Political Department of the 12th Group Army. In 2003 he was named deputy secretary-general of the People's Liberation Army General Political Department (GPD). In December 2005, he was promoted to secretary-general. In February 2008, he was named head of the cadres department of the GPD. In December 2009, he became head of the Political Department of the People's Liberation Army Air Force. In July 2011, he was promoted to the rank of lieutenant general. In November 2012, he was promoted to Political Commissar of the Chengdu Military Region. In February 2016, after the military regions were re-organized, Zhu was appointed to the post of Political Commissar of the Western Theater Command, one of only two lieutenant generals to be appointed to a commander or commissar position of a Theater Command. In July 2016, he was promoted to the rank of general.

In January 2017, Zhu was removed from his post as Political Commissar of the Western Theater Command, and was replaced by Lt. Gen. Wu Shezhou. It was an unusual move because at the age of 61, Zhu had not reached the retirement age of 65 for an officer of his rank.

Zhu was a member of the 18th Central Committee of the Chinese Communist Party.
