= Guizhou Military District =

- 中国人民解放军贵州省军区
- Founded: January 1950; 76 years ago
- Country: People's Republic of China
- Allegiance: Chinese Communist Party
- Type: Military district
- Role: Command and control
- Part of: People's Liberation Army
- Headquarters: Guiyang, Guizhou

Commanders
- Commander: Major general (shaojiang) Wang Lei
- Political Commisar: Major general (shaojiang) Wu Hexian

Chinese name
- Simplified Chinese: 中国人民解放军贵州省军区
- Traditional Chinese: 中國人民解放軍貴州省軍區
Transcriptions
Standard Mandarin
- Hanyu Pinyin: Zhōngguó Rénmín Jiěfàngjūn Guìzhōushěng Jūnqū

The Guizhou Military District (Chinese: 中国人民解放军贵州省军区; full name People's Liberation Army Guizhou Military District or PLA Guizhou Military District) is a military district of the National Defense Mobilization Department of the Central Military Commission in China.

== History ==
Guizhou Military District was originally built in January 1950.

== Leaders ==
=== Commanders ===
Name (English)	Name (Chinese)	Tenure begins	Tenure ends	Note
Yang Yong	杨勇	January 1950		
Su Zhenhua	苏振华	November 1949		
Zhong Chibing	钟赤兵			
Tian Weiyang	田维扬	August 1957	March 1965	
He Guangyu	何光宇			
Zhang Zhong	张忠	1975	1979	
Ren Ying	任应			
Jiao Bin	焦斌	August 1981	July 1990	
Zhu Qi	朱启	June 1990	1994	
Zhong Liming	钟理明	1994	1996	
Chen Qingyun	陈庆云	2003	2005	
Qiu Xingbai	邱型柏	May 2005	June 2007	
Ling Feng	凌峰	August 2008	October 2011	
Li Yazhou	李亚洲	October 2011	November 2013	
Wang Shenghuai	王盛槐	November 2013	April 2017	
Wang Yanyong	王艳勇	April 2017	September 2022	
Wang Lei	王雷	September 2022		

=== Political commissars ===
Name (English)	Name (Chinese)	Tenure begins	Tenure ends	Note
Lan Yinong	蓝亦农	October 1960	August 1973	
Wang Guide	王贵德			
Li Zaihan	李再含			
Chi Biqing	池必卿	June 1980		
Kang Huzhen	康虎振	December 1986	1990	
Jiang Chong'an	蒋崇安	November 2004	January 2009	
Shi Xiao	石晓	December 2008	March 2014	
Xie Wuzhong	谢武忠	March 2014	2018	
Li Hui	李辉	January 2018	April 2023	
Wu Hexian	吴贺宪	April 2023		
