= Cai Yingting =

Chinese general

- 蔡英挺
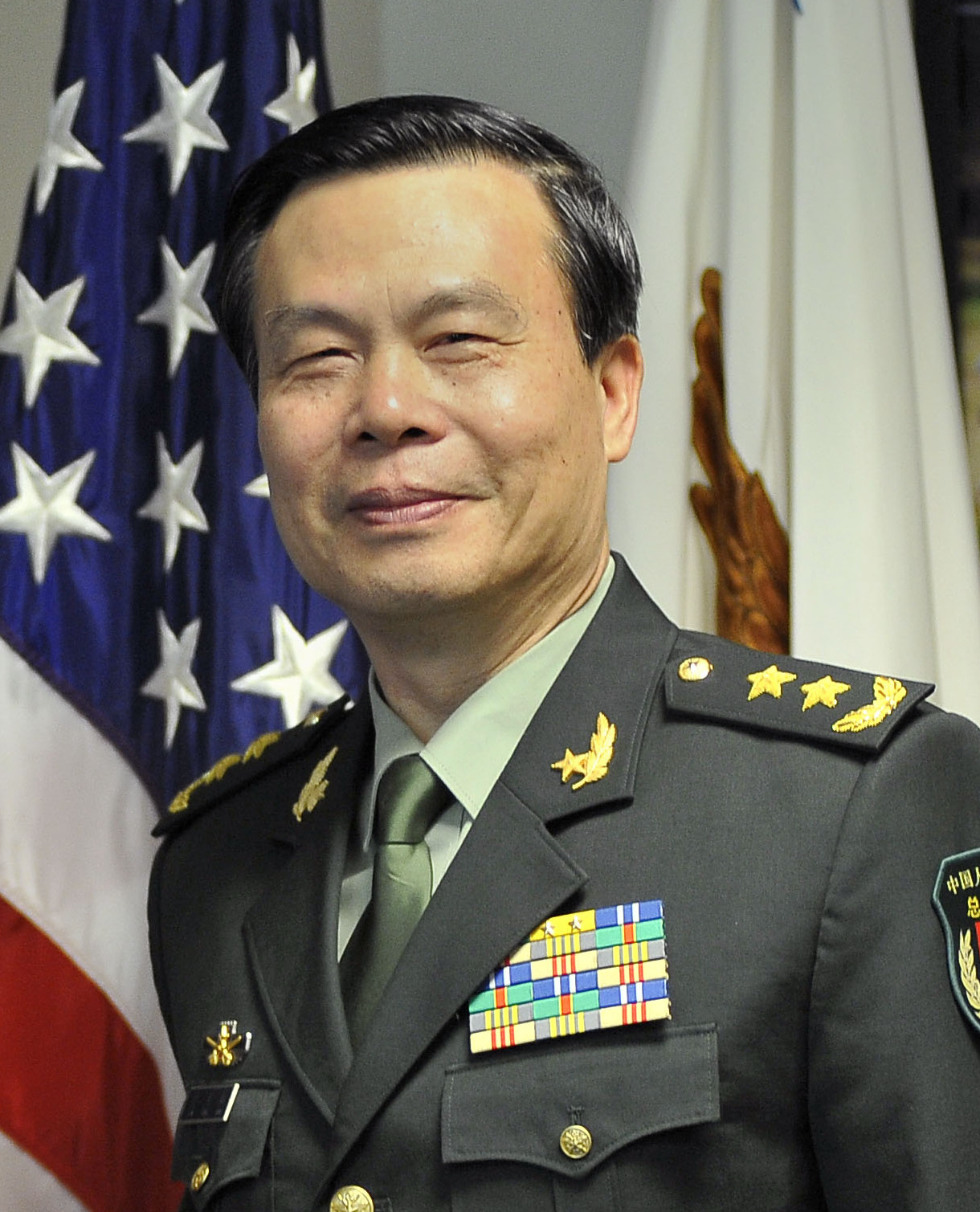
- Cai Yingting at the Pentagon in 2012

President of the PLA Academy of Military Science
- In office February 2016 – January 2017
- Preceded by: Gao Jin
- Succeeded by: Zheng He

Commander of Nanjing Military Region
- In office October 2012 – February 2016
- Preceded by: Zhao Keshi
- Succeeded by: Position abolished

Personal details
- Born: April 1954 (age 72) Jinjiang, Fujian, China
- Party: Chinese Communist Party

Military service
- Allegiance: China
- Branch/service: People's Liberation Army
- Years of service: 1970−2017
- Rank: General
- Commands: Nanjing Military Region

Cai Yingting (Chinese: 蔡英挺; pinyin: Cài Yīngtǐng; Pe̍h-ōe-jī: Chhòa Eng-théng; born April 1954) is a former general of the Chinese People's Liberation Army (PLA). He served as commander of the Nanjing Military Region and president of the PLA Academy of Military Science, but was demoted in 2017.

== Career ==
Cai Yingting was born in April 1954 in Jinjiang, Fujian Province. He joined the PLA in 1970. Cai served for many years in Fujian province, and was known to have deep knowledge of the military situation in Taiwan. In 1996, when then Central Military Commission vice chairman Zhang Wannian was dispatched to the Nanjing Military Region to oversee military maneuvers in the Taiwan Strait, Cai became his secretary. He was also named deputy director of the General Office of the Central Military Commission.

In 2002, Cai returned to the Nanjing MR to serve as deputy chief of staff. In 2011 he was recalled to Beijing to serve as Deputy Chief of the General Staff, the youngest officer of Military Region-level at the time.

Cai served as Deputy Chief of the General Staff from 2011 until 2012. In 2012, Cai made a visit to the United States, including a stop at the U.S. military base at Fort Hood, Texas, and at Pearl Harbor. The visit led to speculation that he was due for further promotion, perhaps to the position of executive deputy chief of general staff. Later that year, Cai was appointed commander of the Nanjing Military Region. He attained the rank of general (shang jiang) in July 2013 and was a full member of the 18th Central Committee of the Chinese Communist Party.

Cai was once seen as a rising star and one of the most trusted allies in the military of Chairman Xi Jinping. He had served as commander of the Xiamen-based 31st Group Army of the Nanjing Military Region, considered Xi's "royal army". Several of his former deputies in the Nanjing MR, including Gen. Song Puxuan, Gen. Wang Jiaocheng, and Lt. Gen. Qin Weijiang, were promoted to higher positions.

== Retirement ==
In January 2017, Cai retired from his post as president of the PLA Academy of Military Science and was not known to have taken on any other post. Cai's departure was unusual, as he had not yet reached the PLA's mandatory retirement age for his rank. In May 2018, the South China Morning Post reported that Cai had been demoted by eight grades, possibly because he had failed to report his daughter's marriage to a Frenchman, and because of his ties to disgraced senior commanders.

Military offices
| Preceded by Zhao Keshi | Commander of the 31st Group Army; 2004–2007 | Succeeded by Wang Ning |
| Preceded by Zhao Keshi | chief of staff of the Nanjing Military Region; 2007–2011 | Succeeded by Yang Hui |
| Preceded by Zhao Keshi | Commander of Nanjing Military Region; 2012–2016 | Succeeded by Position revoked |
| Preceded by Gao Jin | President of the PLA Academy of Military Sciences; 2016–2017 | Succeeded by Zheng He |
