= Chongqing Garrison Command =

- 中国人民解放军重庆警备区
- Founded: 1949; 76 years ago
- Country: People's Republic of China
- Allegiance: Chinese Communist Party
- Type: Garrison command
- Role: Command and control
- Part of: People's Liberation Army
- Headquarters: Chongqing

Commanders
- Commander: Major general (shaojiang) Wang Yanqi
- Political Commisar: Major general (shaojiang) Gao Buming

Chinese name
- Simplified Chinese: 中国人民解放军重庆警备区
- Traditional Chinese: 中國人民解放軍重慶警備區
Transcriptions
Standard Mandarin
- Hanyu Pinyin: Zhōngguó Rénmín Jiěfàngjūn Chóngqìng Jǐngbèiqū

Former name
- Simplified Chinese: 中国人民解放军重庆军分区
- Traditional Chinese: 中國人民解放軍重慶軍分區
Transcriptions
Standard Mandarin
- Hanyu Pinyin: Zhōngguó Rénmín Jiěfàngjūn SìChóngqìng Jūnfēnqū

The Chongqing Garrison Command (Chinese: 中国人民解放军重庆警备区; full name People's Liberation Army Chongqing Garrison Command or PLA Chongqing Garrison Command) is a garrison command of the National Defense Mobilization Department of the Central Military Commission in China.

== History ==
The Chongqing Garrison Command traces its origins to the former Chongqing Military District (中国人民解放军重庆军分区), founded in 1949 and would later become the Chongqing Garrison Command on 16 November 1969.

== Leaders ==
=== Commanders ===
Name (English)	Name (Chinese)	Tenure begins	Tenure ends	Note
Zhu Heping	朱和平	2009	January 2014	
Gao Xiaoyong	高晓勇	January 2014	December 2014	
Wang Yanyong	王艳勇	December 2014	April 2017	
Han Zhikai	韩志凯	April 2017	March 2021	
Liu Shixu	刘士胥	March 2021	2023	
Wang Yanqi	王燕崎	October 2023		

=== Political commissars ===
Name (English)	Name (Chinese)	Tenure begins	Tenure ends	Note
Lang Youliang	郎友良	December 2005	July 2007	
Liang Dongchun	梁冬春	July 2007	July 2014	
Chen Daiping	陈代平	July 2014	August 2017	
Liu Wei	刘伟	August 2017		
Gao Buming	高步明	November 2020		
