= Chongzhou =

Chongzhou 崇州市
- County-level city
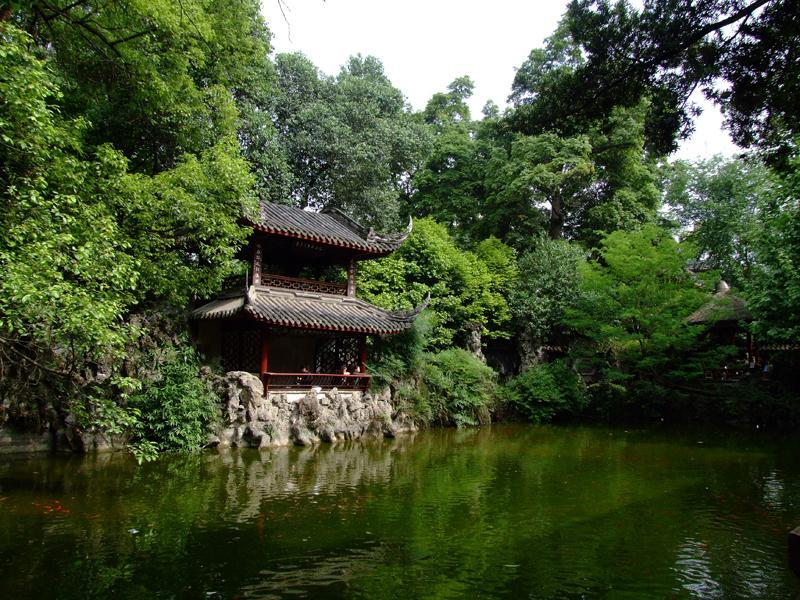

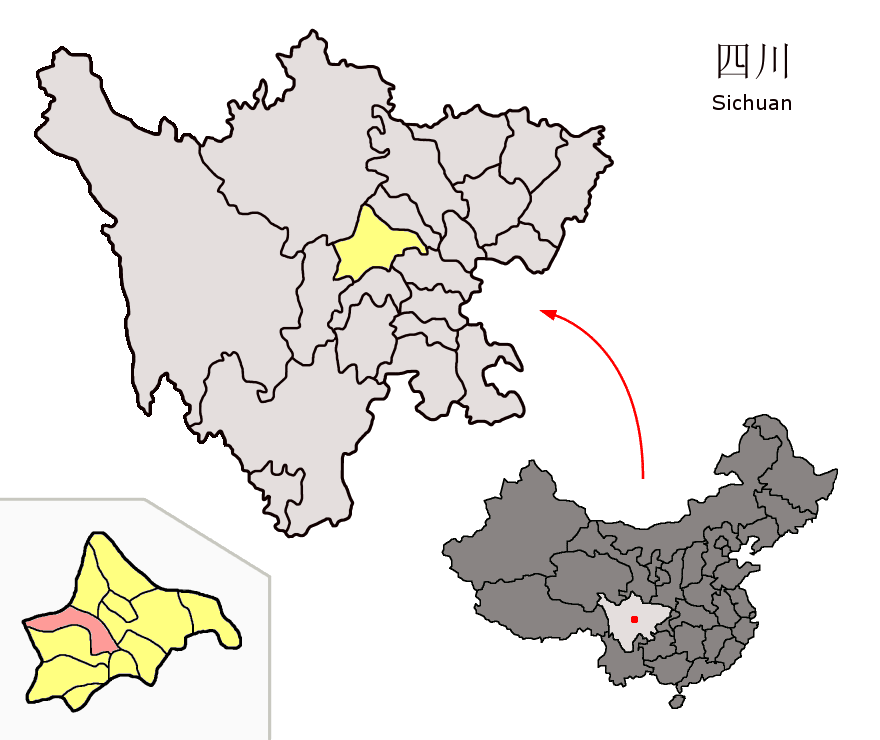
- Location of Chongzhou in Sichuan

- Location in Sichuan
- Coordinates: 30°38′06″N 103°40′09″E
- Country: China
- Province: Sichuan
- Sub-provincial city: Chengdu
- Municipal seat: Chongyang Subdistrict

Area
  - Total: 1,090 km^{2} (420 sq mi)

Population (2020 census)
  - Total: 735,723
  - Density: 607/km^{2} (1,570/sq mi)
- Time zone: UTC+8 (China Standard)
- Postal code: 6112XX
- Website: chongzhou.gov.cn

Chongzhou (Chinese: 崇州; pinyin: Chóngzhōu), known as Chongqing County (simplified Chinese: 崇庆县; traditional Chinese: 崇慶縣) until 1994, is a county-level city of Sichuan Province, Southwest China. It is under the administration of the prefecture-level city of Chengdu. It is located about 37 km (23 mi) west-southwest of downtown Chengdu. The first Catholic synod in China was held in this city in 1803, convened by Gabriel-Taurin Dufresse.

== Overview ==
Chongzhou is accessible by road from central Chengdu via the 65.1 km (40.5 mi)-long S8 Chengdu–Wenjiang–Qionglai Expressway, just outside the Chengdu greater ring road. The largest sports venue by capacity in the city is the 22,000-capacity Chongzhou Sports Centre Stadium. It is used mostly for football matches.

== Administrative divisions ==
Chongzhou administers 6 subdistricts and 9 towns:

- Subdistricts:
  - Chongyang 崇阳街道
  - Yangma 羊马街道
  - Sanjiang 三江街道
  - Jiangyuan 江源街道
  - Dahua 大划街道
  - Chongqing 崇庆街道
- Towns:
  - Liaojia 廖家镇
  - Yuantong 元通镇
  - Guansheng 观胜镇
  - Huaiyuan 怀远镇
  - Jiezi 街子镇
  - Wenjingjiang 文井江镇
  - Baitou 白头镇
  - Daoming 道明镇
  - Longxing 隆兴镇

== Climate ==
Climate data for Chongzhou, elevation 542 m (1,778 ft), (1991–2020 normals, extremes 1981–present)
Month	Jan	Feb	Mar	Apr	May	Jun	Jul	Aug	Sep	Oct	Nov	Dec	Year
Record high °C (°F)	19.9 (67.8)	23.1 (73.6)	30.1 (86.2)	31.8 (89.2)	34.8 (94.6)	35.3 (95.5)	35.6 (96.1)	39.2 (102.6)	35.5 (95.9)	29.0 (84.2)	25.2 (77.4)	18.3 (64.9)	39.2 (102.6)
Mean daily maximum °C (°F)	9.3 (48.7)	12.1 (53.8)	16.8 (62.2)	22.5 (72.5)	26.4 (79.5)	28.3 (82.9)	30.1 (86.2)	29.9 (85.8)	25.7 (78.3)	20.8 (69.4)	16.1 (61.0)	10.7 (51.3)	20.7 (69.3)
Daily mean °C (°F)	5.7 (42.3)	8.2 (46.8)	12.1 (53.8)	17.2 (63.0)	21.2 (70.2)	23.8 (74.8)	25.5 (77.9)	25.1 (77.2)	21.7 (71.1)	17.2 (63.0)	12.5 (54.5)	7.2 (45.0)	16.5 (61.6)
Mean daily minimum °C (°F)	3.1 (37.6)	5.3 (41.5)	8.6 (47.5)	13.2 (55.8)	17.3 (63.1)	20.6 (69.1)	22.2 (72.0)	21.8 (71.2)	19.2 (66.6)	15.0 (59.0)	10.1 (50.2)	4.6 (40.3)	13.4 (56.2)
Record low °C (°F)	−4.7 (23.5)	−3.9 (25.0)	−1.4 (29.5)	3.9 (39.0)	6.9 (44.4)	14.3 (57.7)	16.1 (61.0)	15.7 (60.3)	12.6 (54.7)	2.9 (37.2)	1.0 (33.8)	−4.4 (24.1)	−4.7 (23.5)
Average precipitation mm (inches)	9.4 (0.37)	13.4 (0.53)	29.6 (1.17)	51.3 (2.02)	81.0 (3.19)	116.2 (4.57)	227.6 (8.96)	252.5 (9.94)	132.6 (5.22)	48.1 (1.89)	19.5 (0.77)	7.8 (0.31)	989 (38.94)
Average precipitation days (≥ 0.1 mm)	8.2	8.8	12.1	13.7	14.6	16.1	16.4	15.9	16.6	15.5	8.8	6.7	153.4
Average snowy days	1.2	0.4	0	0	0	0	0	0	0	0	0	0.3	1.9
Average relative humidity (%)	82	80	79	78	75	80	84	84	84	85	84	83	82
Mean monthly sunshine hours	48.6	55.2	82.2	109.5	110.2	98.9	115.2	122.9	60.1	45.9	50.4	47.7	946.8
Percentage possible sunshine	15	17	22	28	26	24	27	30	16	13	16	15	21
Source: China Meteorological Administration all-time extreme temperature all-time January high
