= Western Theater Command =

Military command region of China

- 西部战区
- Founded: 1 February 2016; 10 years ago
- Country: China
- Type: Theater Command
- Role: Command and control
- Part of: People's Liberation Army
- Headquarters: Chengdu, Sichuan
- Website: Official website (in English)

Commanders
- Commander: General Wang Haijiang
- Political Commisar: General Li Fengbiao
- Chief of Staff: Lieutenant General Zhang Jian

Insignia
- Sleeve insignia

The Western Theater Command (Chinese: 西部战区; pinyin: Xībù zhànqū) is one of the five theater commands of the People's Liberation Army. It was founded on 1 February 2016. Its jurisdiction includes Sichuan, Tibet, Gansu, Ningxia, Qinghai, Xinjiang, Shaanxi, Yunnan, Chongqing. Guizhou is also sometimes listed as part of the command.

== Area of Responsibility (AOR) ==
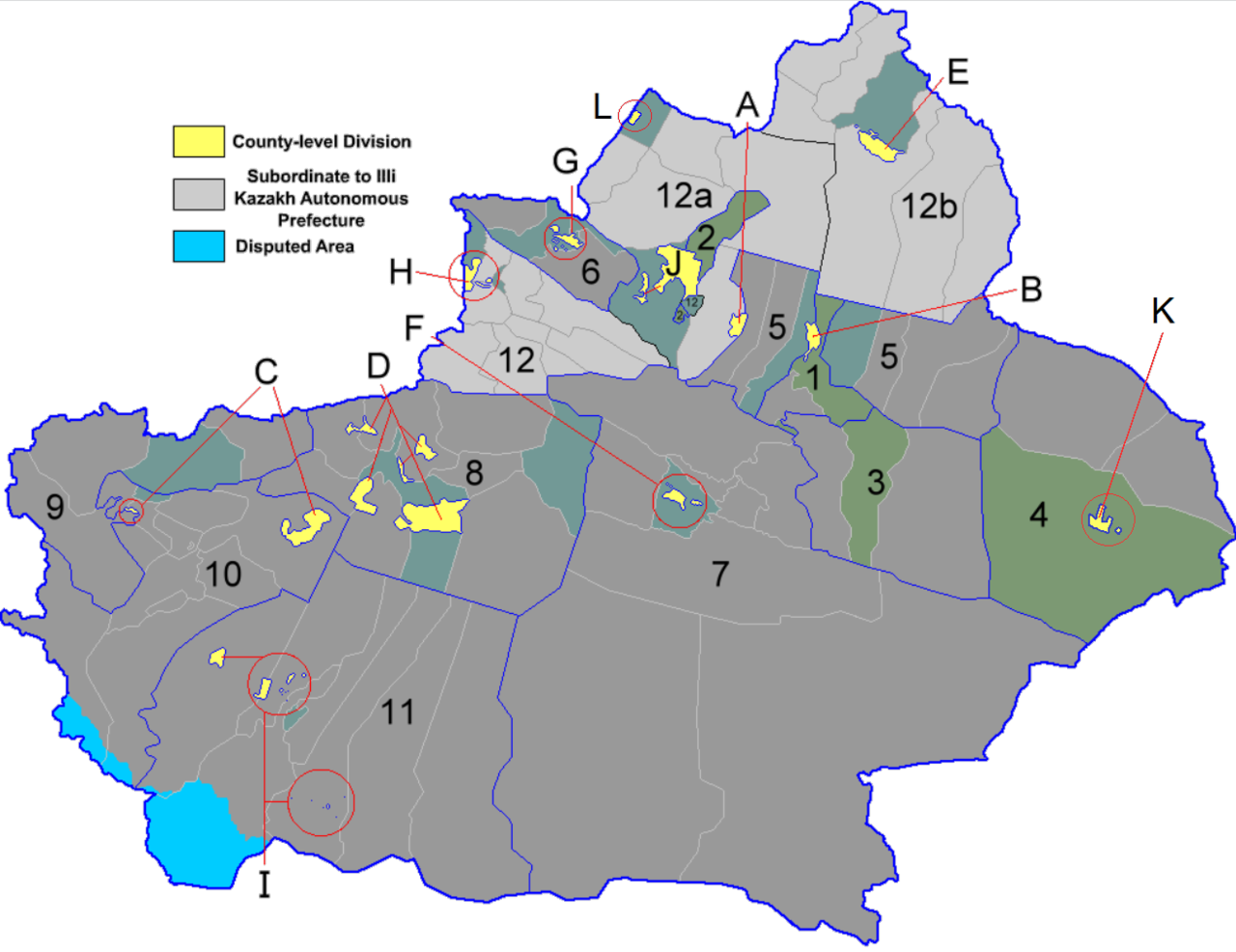
Map of Xinjiang Uyghur Autonomous Region with disputed areas claimed by China shown in blue.

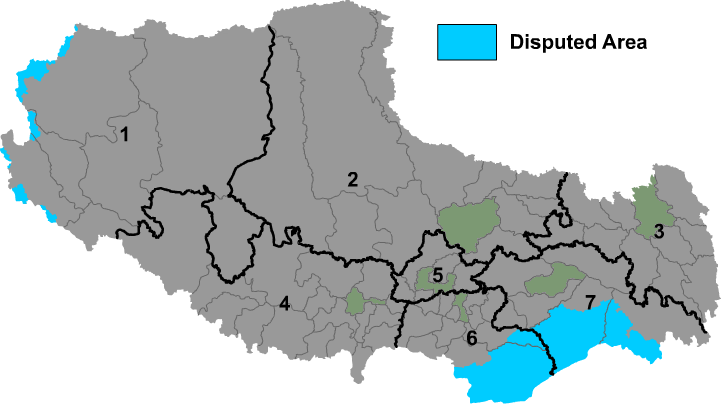
Map of Tibet Autonomous Region with disputed areas claimed by China shown in blue.

Its jurisdiction includes Sichuan, Tibet, Gansu, Ningxia, Qinghai, Xinjiang, Shaanxi, Yunnan, Chongqing. Guizhou is also sometimes listed as part of the command. Western Theater Command's Area of Responsibility (AOR) consists of India, South Asia, Central Asia, Western Mongolia, Pakistan and Afghanistan

== History ==
In May 2016, the PRC raised the rank and status of its western Tibet Military Command to widen its scope for missions and combat preparedness, in a move analysts in Beijing said was aimed in part at fortifying the border with India. The Xinjiang Military Command may also be elevated in the future, the report said. Both commands are under the newly created Western Theater Command, the largest of five newly reorganised military regions of the PLA. The Chinese Communist Party-run tabloid Global Times reported the change would allow the command "to shoulder more combat assignments".

== Organizational structure ==
The Western Theater Command consists of the following components:

- Western Theater Command Ground Force
- Western Theater Command Air Force
  - 33rd Fighter Division
  - 44th Fighter Division
  - 6th Fighter Division
  - 36th Bomber Division
  - 37th Fighter Division
  - 4th Transport Division

== Official hymn ==
Released on 4 November 2020, the Western Theater Command released "The Battle Hymn of the Western Theater Command" (Chinese: 西部战区战歌; pinyin: Xībù zhànqū zhàngē) with lyrics written by the then commander of the Western Theater Command, General Zhao Zongqi and music composed by Luan Kai.

== List of leaders ==
=== Commanders ===
English name	Chinese name	Took office	Left office	Notes
Zhao Zongqi	赵宗岐	February 2016	December 2020	
Zhang Xudong	张旭东	December 2020	June 2021	
Xu Qiling	徐起零	June 2021	August 2021	
Wang Haijiang	汪海江	August 2021	Incumbent	

=== Political commissars ===
English name	Chinese name	Took office	Left office	Notes
Zhu Fuxi	朱福熙	February 2016	January 2017	
Wu Shezhou	吴社洲	January 2017	June 2021	
Li Fengbiao	李凤彪	June 2021	Incumbent	

== See also ==
- Western Theater Command Ground Force
- Western Theater Command Air Force
- Territorial disputes of the People's Republic of China
- List of People's Liberation Army Air Force airbases
