= Sichuan Military District =

Chinese military unit

- 中国人民解放军四川省军区
- Founded: October 1, 1952; 73 years ago
- Country: People's Republic of China
- Allegiance: Chinese Communist Party
- Type: Military district
- Role: Command and control
- Part of: People's Liberation Army
- Headquarters: Chengdu, Sichuan

Commanders
- Commander: Major general (shaojiang) Zhu Pingjiang
- Political Commisar: Major general (shaojiang) Tian Xiaowei

Chinese name
- Simplified Chinese: 中国人民解放军四川省军区
- Traditional Chinese: 中國人民解放軍四川省軍區
Transcriptions
Standard Mandarin
- Hanyu Pinyin: Zhōngguó Rénmín Jiěfàngjūn Sìchuānshěng Jūnqū

The Sichuan Military District (Chinese: 中国人民解放军四川省军区; full name People's Liberation Army Sichuan Military District or PLA Sichuan Military District) is a military district of the National Defense Mobilization Department of the Central Military Commission in China.

== History ==
On 1 October 1952, the Sichuan Military Region was created, which was formed by the merger of four military districts: the East Sichuan Military District, the South Sichuan Military District, the West Sichuan Military District, and the North Sichuan Military District. It was under the jurisdiction of the Southwest Military Region.

== Leaders ==
=== Commanders ===
Name (English)	Name (Chinese)	Tenure begins	Tenure ends	Note
He Bingyan	贺炳炎	October 1952	May 1955	
Hu Jicheng	胡继成	1960	August 1969	
Xie Zhengrong	谢正荣	August 1969	December 1977	
Zhao Wenjin	赵文进	December 1977	May 1983	
Zhang Wenqing	张文清	May 1983	August 1985	
Zhang Changshun	张长顺	August 1985	June 1990	
Ren Yinglai	任应来	June 1990	April 1993	
Ding Zhaoqian	丁兆乾	April 1993	June 1999	
Luo Liewen	罗烈文	June 1999	July 2003	
Shi Xiangyuan	石香元	July 2003	August 2004	
Xia Guofu	夏国富	August 2004	October 2011	
Ling Feng	凌峰	October 2011	November 2013	
Li Yazhou	李亚洲	November 2013	March 2015	
Yang Guangyue	杨光跃	March 2015	July 2015	
Jiang Yongshen	姜永申	July 2015	April 2020	
Qu Xinyong	曲新勇	April 2020	July 2021	
Zhu Pingjiang	朱平江	July 2021		

=== Political commissars ===
Name (English)	Name (Chinese)	Tenure begins	Tenure ends	Note
Deng Jingwei	邓经纬	December 1969	January 1979	
Liao Buyun	廖步云	December 1969	July 1978	
Yu Qian	余潜	December 1969	July 1978	
Lu Jiahan	鲁加汉	November 1972	July 1978	
Hu Yongchang	胡永昌	July 1978	May 1983	
Song Kaiyuan	宋开元	July 1978	May 1983	
Lu Dadong	鲁大东	June 1980	November 1981	First Political Commissar
Tan Qilong	谭启龙	November 1981	May 1983	First Political Commissar
Yang Rudai	杨汝岱	May 1983	June 1986	First Political Commissar
Zhang Weimin	张维民	May 1983	June 1986	
Gao Shuchun	高树春	August 1985	June 1990	
Zhang Shaosong	张少松	June 1990	December 1990	
Ye Wanyong	叶万勇	October 2006	November 2013	
Liu Jiaguo	刘家国	2014	January 2017	
Leng Zhiyi	冷志义	August 2017	June 2018	
Du Kangzhan	杜抗战	October 2018	July 2020	
Cheng Dongfang	程东方	July 2020	April 2021	
Tian Xiaowei	田晓蔚	April 2021		
