= Liu Chengjun (general) =

Chinese general

Liu Zhengjun (Chinese: 刘成军; born 1949) is a retired general (shang jiang) of the People's Liberation Army Air Force (PLAAF) of China. He served as Vice Commander of the PLAAF and President of the PLA Academy of Military Science.

Liu was born in Chengwu County, Shandong Province. His former posts included commander of an Air Force division, vice commander and later commander of PLA Air Force 8th corps and the chief of staff of the Air Force of the Nanjing Military Region. In July 2003, he was appointed vice commander of the Nanjing MR and commander of the Air Force of the Nanjing MR. In December 2004, he was promoted to the post of vice commander of the PLA Air Force. In 2007, he succeeded general Zheng Shenxia as President of PLA Academy of Military Science.

He attained the rank of lieutenant general of the Air Force in July 2004, and full general in 2010. He was a member of the 17th Central Committee of the Chinese Communist Party. He retired from the military in December 2014.
