= Alternates of the 19th Central Committee of the Chinese Communist Party =

The 19th Central Committee of the Chinese Communist Party was elected by the 19th National Congress in 2017, with 172 individuals serving as alternates during this term.

== Alternates ==
Alternates of the 19th Central Committee of the Chinese Communist Party
Ballot	Name		18th CC	20th CC	Birth	PM	Death	Birthplace	Ethnicity	Gender	Ref.
1	Ma Zhengwu	马正武	Nonmember	Nonmember	1963	—	Alive	—	Han	Male	
2	Ma Weiming	马伟明	Alternate	Nonmember	1960	—	Alive	Jiangsu	Han	Male	
3	Ma Guoqiang	马国强	Nonmember	Nonmember	1963	1985	Alive	Hebei	Hui	Male	
4	Wang Ning	王宁	Nonmember	Member	1961	1983	Alive	Hunan	Han	Male	
5	Wang Yongkang	王永康	Nonmember	Nonmember	1963	1984	Alive	Hubei	Han	Male	
6	Wang Weizhong	王伟中	Nonmember	Member	1962	1983	Alive	Shanxi	Han	Male	
7	Wang Xudong	王旭东	Nonmember	Alternate	1967	2003	Alive	Gansu	Han	Male	
8	Wang Xiubin	王秀斌	Nonmember	Member	1964	—	Alive	Jiangsu	Han	Male	
9	Wang Junzheng	王君正	Nonmember	Member	1963	1987	Alive	Shandong	Han	Male	
10	Wang Chunning	王春宁	Nonmember	Member	1963	1986	Alive	Shandong	Han	Male	
11	Feng Jianhua	冯建华	Nonmember	Nonmember	1958	—	Alive	Shandong	Han	Male	
12	Qumu Shiha	曲木史哈	Nonmember	Nonmember	1960	1985	Alive	Sichuan	Yi	Male	
13	Ren Xuefeng	任学锋	Alternate	Nonmember	1965	1985	2019	Hebei	Han	Male	
14	Liu Ning	刘宁	Nonmember	Member	1962	1990	Alive	Jilin	Han	Male	
15	Liu Faqing	刘发庆	Nonmember	Member	1964	—	Alive	Henan	Han	Male	
16	Liu Xiaokai	刘晓凯	Alternate	Nonmember	1962	1985	Alive	Guizhou	Miao	Male	
17	Yan Jinhai	严金海	Nonmember	Member	1962	1983	Alive	Tibet	Tibetan	Male	
18	Yan Zhichan	严植婵	Nonmember	Nonmember	1964	1985	Alive	Guangdong	Han	Female	
19	Li Qun	李群	Alternate	Nonmember	1962	1984	Alive	Shandong	Han	Male	
20	Li Jinghao	李景浩	Nonmember	Nonmember	1961	—	Alive	Jilin	Korean	Male	
21	Yang Ning	杨宁	Nonmember	Nonmember	1963	1985	Alive	Yunnan	Bai	Female	
22	Yang Wei	杨伟	Nonmember	Nonmember	1963	—	Alive	Sichuan	Han	Male	
23	Xiao Yingzi	肖莺子	Nonmember	Nonmember	1963	1987	Alive	Guangxi	Zhuang	Female	
24	Wu Qiang	吴强	Nonmember	Alternate	1966	1994	Alive	Hunnan	Dong	Male	
25	Wu Cunrong	吴存荣	Nonmember	Nonmember	1963	1984	Alive	Anhui	Han	Male	
26	Wu Jieming	吴杰明	Nonmember	Nonmember	1958	1978	Alive	—	Han	Male	
27	Wu Shenghua	吴胜华	Nonmember	Alternate	1966	1994	Alive	Guizhou	Bouyei	Male	
28	Zou Ming	邹铭	Nonmember	Nonmember	1964	1988	Alive	Jiangxi	Han	Male	
29	Shen Chunyao	沈春耀	Nonmember	Member	1960	—	Alive	Shandong	Han	Male	
30	Song Guoquan	宋国权	Nonmember	Nonmember	1960	1985	Alive	Anhui	Han	Male	
31	Zhang Guangjun	张广军	Nonmember	Nonmember	1965	1986	Alive	Tianjin	Han	Male	
32	Zhang Yuzhuo	张玉卓	Nonmember	Member	1962	1985	Alive	Shandong	Han	Male	
33	Zhang Zhifen	张志芬	Nonmember	Nonmember	1966	—	Alive	Hunan	Han	Male	
34	Zhang Zhenzhong	张振中	Nonmember	Nonmember	1961	—	Alive	Shaanxi	Han	Male	
35	Zhang Jinghua (Note: Zhang Jinghua was put under formal investigation by the 19th Central Commission for Discipline Inspection (19th CCDI) on 1 December 2021. Following deliberation by the Standing Committee of the 19th CCDI, his removal as an alternate of the 19th Central Committee was proposed to the 19th Politburo. The Politburo adopted the recommendation, pending subsequent confirmation by the 19th Central Committee at its next plenary session. The decision was then ratified ex post by the 7th Plenary Session of the 19th Central Committee, held on 9–12 October 2022.)	张敬华	Nonmember	Nonmember	1963	1985	Alive	Jiangsu	Han	Male	
36	Chen Gang	陈刚	Nonmember	Member	1965	1986	Alive	Jiangsu	Han	Male	
37	Chen Yixin	陈一新	Nonmember	Member	1959	1982	Alive	Zhejiang	Han	Male	
38	Chen Haibo	陈海波	Nonmember	Nonmember	1962	1982	Alive	Jilin	Han	Male	
39	Lin Shaochun	林少春	Nonmember	Nonmember	1962	1988	Alive	Guangdong	Han	Male	
40	Hang Yihong	杭义洪	Nonmember	Alternate	1962	—	Alive	Shandong	Han	Male	
41	Ouyang Xiaoping	欧阳晓平	Nonmember	Nonmember	1961	—	Alive	Hunan	Han	Male	
42	Norbu Dondrup	罗布顿珠	Nonmember	Nonmember	1960	1978	Alive	Tibet	Tibetan	Male	
43	Luo Hongjiang	罗红江	Nonmember	Nonmember	1962	1988	Alive	Yunnan	Dai	Male	
44	Luo Qingyu	罗清宇	Nonmember	Nonmember	1963	1986	Alive	Shanxi	Han	Male	
45	Jin Donghan	金东寒	Alternate	Alternate	1961	1984	Alive	Heilongjiang	Han	Male	
46	Zhou Bo	周波	Nonmember	Nonmember	1962	—	Alive	Shanghai	Han	Male	
47	Zhou Qi	周琪	Nonmember	Nonmember	1970	—	Alive	Heilongjiang	Han	Male	
48	Zhou Naixiang	周乃翔	Nonmember	Member	1961	1987	Alive	Jiangsu	Han	Male	
49	Guan Qing	官庆	Nonmember	Nonmember	1964	1986	2020	Sichuan	Han	Male	
50	Zhao Yupei	赵玉沛	Alternate	Nonmember	1954	—	Alive	Jilin	Han	Male	
51	Zhao Aiming	赵爱明	Alternate	Nonmember	1961	1985	Alive	Henan	Han	Female	
52	Zhao Deming	赵德明	Nonmember	Nonmember	1963	1985	Alive	Guangxi	Yao	Male	
53	Hao Ping	郝平	Nonmember	Nonmember	1959	1982	Alive	Shandong	Han	Male	
54	Hu Wenrong	胡文容	Nonmember	Alternate	1964	1990	Alive	Fujian	Han	Male	
55	Hu Henghua	胡衡华	Nonmember	Member	1963	1985	Alive	Hunan	Han	Male	
56	Duan Chunhua	段春华	Alternate	Nonmember	1959	1983	Alive	Hebei	Han	Male	
57	Yu Guang	禹光	Nonmember	Nonmember	1958	—	Alive	Hunan	Han	Male	
58	Jiang Zhigang	姜志刚	Nonmember	Nonmember	1960	1986	Alive	Jiangsu	Han	Male	
59	He Dongfeng	贺东风	Nonmember	Nonmember	1966	1988	Alive	Heilongjiang	Han	Male	
60	He Junke	贺军科	Nonmember	Member	1969	1995	Alive	Shaanxi	Han	Male	
61	Jia Yumei	贾玉梅	Nonmember	Nonmember	1963	1983	Alive	Shandong	Han	Female	
62	Xu Zhongbo	徐忠波	Nonmember	Member	1960	—	Alive	Shandong	Han	Male	
63	Xu Hairong	徐海荣	Nonmember	Nonmember	1964	1984	Alive	Chongqing	Han	Male	
64	Xu Xinrong	徐新荣	Nonmember	Nonmember	1962	1984	Alive	Shaanxi	Han	Male	
65	Gao Guangbin	高广滨	Alternate	Nonmember	1963	1984	Alive	Heilongjiang	Han	Male	
66	Guo Dongming	郭东明	Nonmember	Nonmember	1959	1989	Alive	Henan	Han	Male	
67	Tang Yijun	唐一军	Nonmember	Nonmember	1961	1985	Alive	Shandong	Han	Male	
68	Tang Dengjie	唐登杰	Nonmember	Member	1964	1991	Alive	Jiangsu	Han	Male	
69	Huang Minqiang	黄民强	Nonmember	Nonmember	1960	—	Alive	Shanghai	Han	Male	
70	Huang Guoxian	黄国显	Nonmember	Nonmember	1962	—	Alive	Henan	Han	Male	
71	Huang Lixin	黄莉新	Alternate	Nonmember	1962	1983	Alive	Jiangsu	Han	Female	
72	Huang Xiaowei	黄晓薇	Nonmember	Member	1961	1983	Alive	Liaoning	Han	Female	
73	Cao Jianguo	曹建国	Nonmember	Nonmember	1963	1992	Alive	Anhui	Han	Male	
74	Chang Dingqiu	常丁求	Nonmember	Member	1967	—	Alive	Hunan	Han	Male	
75	Cui Yuzhong	崔玉忠	Nonmember	Alternate	1964	—	Alive	Heilongjiang	Han	Male	
76	Ma Zhenjun	麻振军	Nonmember	Nonmember	1962	—	Alive	Henan	Han	Male	
77	Liang Tiangeng	梁田庚	Nonmember	Nonmember	1960	1983	Alive	Guangdong	Han	Male	
78	Kou Wei	寇伟	Nonmember	Nonmember	1961	—	Alive	Yunnan	Bai	Male	
79	Peng Jinhui	彭金辉	Nonmember	Nonmember	1964	1989	Alive	Yunnan	Yi	Male	
80	Cheng Lianyuan	程连元	Nonmember	Nonmember	1961	1982	Alive	Beijing	Han	Male	
81	Fu Xingguo	傅兴国	Nonmember	Nonmember	1960	1987	Alive	Tianjin	Han	Male	
82	Xie Chuntao	谢春涛	Nonmember	Member	1963	1985	Alive	Shandong	Han	Male	
83	Lan Tianli	蓝天立	Alternate	Member	1962	1985	Alive	Guangxi	Zhuang	Male	
84	Cai Jianjiang	蔡剑江	Nonmember	Member	1963	—	Alive	Jiangsu	Han	Male	
85	Pei Jinjia	裴金佳	Nonmember	Member	1963	1990	Alive	Fujian	Han	Male	
86	Tan Zuojun	谭作钧	Nonmember	Nonmember	1968	—	Alive	Hunan	Han	Male	
87	Dai Houliang	戴厚良	Nonmember	Nonmember	1963	—	Alive	Jiangsu	Han	Male	
88	Yu Shaoliang	于绍良	Nonmember	Nonmember	1964	1984	Alive	Hebei	Han	Male	
89	Ma Shunqing	马顺清	Alternate	Nonmember	1963	1984	Alive	Qinghai	Hui	Male	
90	Wang Hong	王宏	Nonmember	Nonmember	1963	1994	Alive	Shandong	Han	Male	
91	Wang Zhaoli	王兆力	Nonmember	Nonmember	1962	1984	Alive	Heilongjiang	Han	Male	
92	Wang Jingqing	王京清	Nonmember	Nonmember	1958	1975	Alive	Shandong	Han	Male	
93	Wang Xiaoyun	王晓云	Nonmember	Alternate	1968	—	Alive	Zhejiang	Han	Female	
94	Wang Endong	王恩东	Nonmember	Nonmember	1966	1993	Alive	Shandong	Han	Male	
95	Fang Xiang	方向	Nonmember	Nonmember	1959	—	Alive	Zhejiang	Han	Male	
96	Kong Changsheng	孔昌生	Nonmember	Nonmember	1963	1988	Alive	Gansu	Han	Male	
97	Deng Xiaogang	邓小刚	Nonmember	Nonmember	1960	—	Alive	Sichuan	Han	Male	
98	Erkin Tuniyaz	艾尔肯·吐尼亚孜	Nonmember	Member	1961	1983	Alive	Xinjiang	Uyghur	Male	
99	Shi Zhenglu	石正露	Nonmember	Alternate	1963	—	Alive	Hubei	Han	Male	
100	Shen Changyu	申长雨	Nonmember	Nonmember	1963	—	Alive	Henan	Han	Male	
101	Feng Zhenglin	冯正霖	Nonmember	Nonmember	1957	—	Alive	Shaanxi	Han	Male	
102	Lü Jun	吕军	Nonmember	Nonmember	1967	—	Alive	Hebei	Han	Male	
103	Li Jia (Note: Li Jia was removed from all political posts on 2 August 2022, and was put under formal investigation by the 19th Central Commission for Discipline Inspection (19th CCDI) on 26 August. Following deliberation by the Standing Committee of the 19th CCDI, his removal as an alternate of the 19th Central Committee was proposed to the 19th Politburo. The Politburo adopted the recommendation, pending subsequent confirmation by the 19th Central Committee at its next plenary session. The decision was then ratified ex post by the 7th Plenary Session of the 19th Central Committee, held on 9–12 October 2022.)	李佳	Alternate	Nonmember	1961	1985	Alive	Liaoning	Han	Male	
104	Li Yuchao	李玉超	Nonmember	Member	1962	—	Alive	Henan	Han	Male	
105	Li Xiaobo	李晓波	Nonmember	Nonmember	1963	1986	Alive	Inner Mongolia	Han	Male	
106	Yang Guangyue	杨光跃	Nonmember	Nonmember	1958	—	Alive	Yunnan	Naxi	Male	
107	Wu Zhaohui	吴朝晖	Nonmember	Alternate	1966	1995	Alive	Zhejiang	Han	Male	
108	He Yaling	何雅玲	Nonmember	Alternate	1963	—	Alive	Shaanxi	Han	Female	
109	Zhang Gong	张工	Nonmember	Member	1961	1992	Alive	Beijing	Han	Male	
110	Zhang Jiangting	张江汀	Nonmember	Nonmember	1961	1984	Alive	Shandong	Han	Male	
111	Zhang Fuhai	张福海	Nonmember	Nonmember	1964	1984	Alive	Liaoning	Han	Male	
112	Chen Xu	陈旭	Nonmember	Member	1963	1984	Alive	Hebei	Han	Female	
113	Chen Siqing	陈四清	Nonmember	Nonmember	1960	—	Alive	Hunan	Han	Male	
114	Fan Ruiping	范锐平	Nonmember	Nonmember	1966	1985	Alive	Hubei	Han	Male	
115	Yi Gang	易纲	Nonmember	Nonmember	1958	—	Alive	Beijing	Han	Male	
116	Yi Huiman	易会满	Nonmember	Member	1964	—	Alive	Zhejiang	Han	Male	
117	Yi Lianhong	易炼红	Nonmember	Member	1959	1985	Alive	Hunan	Han	Male	
118	Zhao Huan	赵欢	Nonmember	Nonmember	1963	—	Alive	Hubei	Han	Male	
119	Zhao Yide	赵一德	Nonmember	Member	1965	1985	Alive	Zhejiang	Han	Male	
120	Zhong Denghua	钟登华	Nonmember	Nonmember	1963	—	Alive	Jiangxi	Han	Male	
121	Xin Changxing	信长星	Nonmember	Member	1964	1986	Alive	Shandong	Han	Male	
122	Shi Xiaolin	施小琳	Nonmember	Alternate	1969	1993	Alive	Zhejiang	Han	Female	
123	Qian Zhimin	钱智民	Alternate	Nonmember	1960	1985	Alive	Jiangsu	Han	Male	
124	Guo Mingyi	郭明义	Alternate	Nonmember	1958	1980	Alive	Liaoning	Han	Male	
125	Tang Huajun	唐华俊	Nonmember	Nonmember	1960	1989	Alive	Sichuan	Han	Male	
126	Tang Liangzhi	唐良智	Nonmember	Nonmember	1960	1982	Alive	Hubei	Han	Male	
127	Huang Zhixian	黄志贤	Nonmember	Nonmember	1956	1985	Alive	Taiwan	Han	Male	
128	Ge Huijun	葛慧君	Alternate	Nonmember	1963	1982	Alive	Zhejiang	Han	Female	
129	Jing Junhai	景俊海	Nonmember	Member	1960	1982	Alive	Shaanxi	Han	Male	
130	Cheng Lihua	程丽华	Nonmember	Member	1965	1987	Alive	Henan	Han	Female	
131	Fu Ziying	傅自应	Nonmember	Nonmember	1957	1992	Alive	Hubei	Han	Male	
132	Jiao Yanlong	焦彦龙	Nonmember	Nonmember	1960	1986	Alive	Hebei	Han	Male	
133	Lei Fanpei	雷凡培	Nonmember	Member	1963	1985	Alive	Shaanxi	Han	Male	
134	Shen Haixiong	慎海雄	Nonmember	Member	1967	1987	Alive	Zhejiang	Han	Male	
135	Cai Songtao	蔡松涛	Nonmember	Nonmember	1974	—	Alive	Henan	Han	Male	
136	Yan Xiaodong	颜晓东	Nonmember	Nonmember	1960	—	Alive	Henan	Han	Male	
137	Pan Gongsheng	潘功胜	Nonmember	Nonmember	1963	1993	Alive	Anhui	Han	Male	
138	Ma Tingli	马廷礼	Nonmember	Nonmember	1963	1985	Alive	Ningxia	Hui	Male	
139	Wang Hai	王海	Nonmember	Nonmember	1960	—	Alive	Zhejiang	Han	Male	
140	Wang Xi	王曦	Nonmember	Alternate	1966	2001	Alive	Jiangsu	Han	Male	
141	Wang Yinfang	王印芳	Nonmember	Nonmember	1962	—	Alive	Hebei	Han	Male	
142	Wang Yanling	王艳玲	Nonmember	Nonmember	1962	1982	Alive	Henan	Han	Female	
143	Mao Wanchun	毛万春	Alternate	Nonmember	1961	1983	Alive	Henan	Han	Male	
144	Ulan	乌兰	Alternate	Nonmember	1962	1984	Alive	Inner Mongolia	Mongolian	Female	
145	Yin Hong	尹弘	Nonmember	Member	1963	1984	Alive	Zhejiang	Han	Male	
146	Tian Guoli	田国立	Nonmember	Nonmember	1960	—	Alive	Hebei	Han	Male	
147	Le Yucheng	乐玉成	Nonmember	Nonmember	1963	—	Alive	Jiangsu	Han	Male	
148	Liu Shiquan	刘石泉	Alternate	Nonmember	1963	1985	Alive	Hubei	Han	Male	
149	Sun Dawei	孙大伟	Nonmember	Nonmember	1963	1984	Alive	Heilongjiang	Han	Male	
150	Yin Hejun	阴和俊	Nonmember	Member	1963	1983	Alive	Shanxi	Han	Male	
151	Chen Qing	陈青	Nonmember	Nonmember	1960	1980	Alive	Zhejiang	Han	Female	
152	Hu Changsheng	胡昌升	Nonmember	Member	1963	1986	Alive	Jiangxi	Han	Male	
153	Cao Shumin	曹淑敏	Alternate	Alternate	1966	1990	Alive	Hebei	Han	Female	
154	Miao Jianmin	缪建民	Nonmember	Nonmember	1965	—	Alive	Zhejiang	Han	Male	
155	Wei Gang	魏钢	Nonmember	Nonmember	1960	—	Alive	Shandong	Han	Male	
156	Wang Jiong	王炯	Nonmember	Nonmember	1964	1984	Alive	Henan	Han	Male	
157	Wang Wentao	王文涛	Alternate	Member	1964	1994	Alive	Jiangsu	Han	Male	
158	Mao Weiming	毛伟明	Nonmember	Member	1961	1985	Alive	Zhejiang	Han	Male	
159	Deng Xiaogang	邓小刚	Nonmember	Nonmember	1968	1995	Alive	Hubei	Han	Male	
160	Ren Hongbin	任洪斌	Alternate	Nonmember	1963	—	Alive	Jilin	Han	Male	
161	Li Jing	李静	Nonmember	Nonmember	1962	1983	Alive	Henan	Han	Female	
162	Li Yinghong	李应红	Nonmember	Nonmember	1963	—	Alive	Chongqing	Han	Male	
163	Wu Xiaoguang	吴晓光	Nonmember	Nonmember	1960	1986	Alive	Guangdong	Han	Male	
164	Song Yushui	宋鱼水	Nonmember	Alternate	1966	1988	Alive	Shandong	Han	Female	
165	Tuo Zhen	庹震	Nonmember	Member	1959	1982	Alive	Henan	Han	Male	
166	Pan Yue	潘岳	Nonmember	Member	1963	1987	Alive	Jiangsu	Han	Male	
167	Ding Yexian	丁业现	Nonmember	Nonmember	1960	1990	Alive	Shandong	Han	Male	
168	Wang Lixia	王莉霞	Nonmember	Member	1964	1992	Alive	Liaoning	Mongol	Female	
169	Ning Jizhe	宁吉喆	Nonmember	Nonmember	1956	1985	Alive	Anhui	Han	Male	
170	Yang Jincheng	杨金成	Nonmember	Nonmember	1963	1994	Alive	Hubei	Han	Male	
171	Shu Qing	舒庆	Nonmember	Nonmember	1964	1984	Alive	Shandong	Manchu	Male	
172	Yao Zengke	姚增科	Nonmember	Nonmember	1960	1982	Alive	Shanxi	Han	Male	
