= 19th Central Committee of the Chinese Communist Party =

2017–2022 Central Committee

19th Central Committee 中国共产党第十九届中央委员会
- Emblem of the Chinese Communist Party

24 October 2017 – 21 October 2022 Overview
- Type: Central Committee of the Chinese Communist Party
- Election: 19th Congress

Leadership
- General Secretary: Xi Jinping
- Politburo Standing Committee: 7
- Politburo: 25
- Secretariat: 7

Members
- Total: 204

Alternates
- Total: 172

Apparatus
- Head of General Office: Ding Xuexiang
- No. of departments: 4

Plenary sessions
- 1st: 25 October 2017; 2nd: 18–19 January 2018; 3rd: 26–28 February 2018; 4th: 28–31 October 2019; 5th: 26–29 October 2020; 6th: 8–11 November 2021

The 19th Central Committee of the Chinese Communist Party was elected by the 19th National Congress in 2017, and sat until the next National Congress was convened in 2022. It formally succeeded the 18th Central Committee of the Chinese Communist Party and preceded the 20th Central Committee of the Chinese Communist Party.

The first plenary session in 2017 was responsible for electing the bodies in which the authority of the Central Committee is invested when it is not in session: the Politburo and the Politburo Standing Committee. It was also responsible for approving the members of the Secretariat, 19th Central Commission for Discipline Inspection and its Standing Committee. The third plenary session in 2018 nominated candidates for state positions. The fourth plenary session issued a decision on modernizing governance. The 19th Central Committee is the first Central Committee in which all the members were born after the foundation of the People's Republic of China in 1949.

== Plenums ==
Plenum	Start–end	Length	Summary
1st Plenary Session	25 October 2017	1 day	Xi Jinping was elected General Secretary and CMC Chairman. A 25-member Politburo, 7-member Politburo Standing Committee and seven member Secretariat with Wang Huning as first-ranking secretary were elected. The plenum approved the composition SC–CCDI elected by the CCDI 1st Plenary Session, and the election of Zhao Leji as CCDI Secretary, CCDI Secretary-General and several CCDI deputy secretaries.
2nd Plenary Session	18–19 January 2018	2 days	A revision to the Constitution of China to include Xi Jinping Thought, a strengthening of party leadership and a restructuring of the national supervisory system in the constitutional text were decided upon.
3rd Plenary Session	26–28 February 2018	3 days	Draft decisions and lists of nominees for top state positions to be submitted to the 1st Sessions of the 13th National People's Congress and the 13th Chinese People's Political Consultative Conference.
4th Plenary Session	28–31 October 2019	4 days	The committee passed the "Decision on Upholding and Perfecting Socialism with Chinese Characteristics and Advancing the Modernization of the Governance System and Governance Ability". The Committee affirmed Liu Shiyu's removal from the body and his two-year probation. Ma Zhengwu and Ma Weiming were admitted as full members of the Central Committee.
5th Plenary Session	26–29 October 2020	4 days	It adopted the 14th Five-Year Plan for National Economic and Social Development (2021–2025) and the "Long-Range Objectives Through the Year 2035".
6th Plenary Session	8–11 November 2021	4 days	It adopted Resolution on the major achievements and historical experience of the Party's 100 years of endeavors.
7th Plenary Session	9-12 October 2022	4 days	

== Working organs ==
=== Heads of department-level institutions ===
Institution	Name	Birth	Hanzi	Took office	Left office	Tenure
Central Commission for Discipline Inspection	Zhao Leji	1957	赵乐际	24 October 2017	22 October 2022	4 years and 363 days
General Office of the Central Committee for Financial and Economic Affairs	Liu He	1952	刘鹤	24 October 2017	22 October 2022	4 years and 363 days
General Office of the Central Committee for Foreign Affairs	Yang Jiechi	1950	杨洁篪	24 October 2017	22 October 2022	4 years and 363 days
Central International Liaison Department	Song Tao	1955	宋涛	24 October 2017	1 June 2022	4 years and 220 days
Central International Liaison Department	Liu Jianchao	1964	刘建超	1 June 2022	22 October 2022	143 days
Central Organization Department	Chen Xi	1953	陈希	28 October 2017	22 October 2022	4 years and 359 days
Central Policy Research Office	Wang Huning	1955	王沪宁	24 October 2017	1 October 2020	2 years and 343 days
Central Policy Research Office	Jiang Jinquan	1959	江金权	1 October 2020	22 October 2022	2 years and 21 days
Central Political and Legal Affairs Commission	Guo Shengkun	1954	郭声琨	31 October 2017	28 October 2022	4 years and 362 days
Central Publicity Department	Huang Kunming	1956	黄坤明	29 October 2017	26 October 2022	4 years and 362 days
Central Taiwan Task Office	Zhang Zhijun	1953	张志军	24 October 2017	21 March 2018	148 days
Central Taiwan Task Office	Liu Jieyi	1957	刘结一	21 March 2018	22 October 2022	4 years and 215 days
Central United Front Work Department	You Quan	1954	尤权	7 November 2017	27 October 2022	4 years and 354 days
General Office	Ding Xuexiang	1962	丁薛祥	29 October 2017	22 October 2022	4 years and 358 days
General Office of the Central Institutional Organization Commission	Zhang Jinan	1957	张纪南	24 October 2017	13 May 2019	1 year and 201 days
General Office of the Central Institutional Organization Commission	Zhou Zuyi	1965	周祖翼	13 May 2019	30 April 2022	2 years and 352 days
General Office of the Central Institutional Organization Commission	Li Xiaoxin	1962	李小新	30 April 2022	22 October 2022	175 days
International Communications Office	Jiang Jianguo	1956	蒋建国	24 October 2017	31 July 2018	274 days
International Communications Office	Xu Lin	1957	徐麟	21 August 2018	8 June 2022	3 years and 291 days
Working Committee of Organs for Central and State Organs	Ding Xuexiang	1962	丁薛祥	29 October 2017	22 October 2022	4 years and 358 days

=== Heads of IDUCC institutions ===
Institution	Name	Birth	Hanzi	Took office	Left office	Tenure
Central Compilation and Translation Bureau	Jia Gaojian	1959	贾高建	24 October 2017	22 March 2018	13 years and 202 days
Central Literature Research Office	Leng Rong	1953	冷溶	24 October 2017	22 March 2018	8 years and 285 days
Central Party History Research Centre	Qu Qingshan	1957	曲青山	24 October 2017	22 March 2018	12 years and 247 days
Central Party School	Chen Xi	1953	陈希	24 October 2017	22 October 2022	4 years and 363 days
China Executive Leadership Academy, Jinggangshan	Chen Xi	1953	陈希	24 October 2017	22 October 2022	4 years and 363 days
China Executive Leadership Academy, Pudong	Chen Xi	1953	陈希	24 October 2017	22 October 2022	4 years and 363 days
China Executive Leadership Academy, Yan'an	Chen Xi	1953	陈希	24 October 2017	22 October 2022	4 years and 363 days
Guangming Daily	Zhang Zheng	1966	张政	24 October 2017	1 May 2021	3 years and 189 days
Guangming Daily	Wang Huimin	1965	王慧敏	1 May 2021	22 October 2022	1 year and 174 days
Institute of Party History and Literature	Leng Rong	1953	冷溶	21 November 2018	30 April 2019	160 days
Institute of Party History and Literature	Qu Qingshan	1957	曲青山	30 April 2019	22 October 2022	3 years and 175 days
People's Daily	Yang Zhenwu	1955	杨振武	24 October 2017	3 April 2018	161 days
People's Daily	Li Baoshan	1955	李宝善	3 April 2018	16 October 2020	2 years and 196 days
People's Daily	Tuo Zhen	1959	庹震	16 October 2020	22 October 2022	2 years and 6 days
Qiushi	Li Jie	1955	李捷	24 October 2017	24 August 2018	304 days
Qiushi	Xia Weidong	1955	夏伟东	24 August 2018	22 October 2022	4 years and 59 days
References for table (if not referenced here, it is referenced by the section "Sources"):

== Membership ==
=== Members ===
Notes

- The Hanzi column is listed according to the number of strokes in their surnames, which is the official ordering method.

Name	Birth	Hanzi	Gov. level (offices held)	18th CC	Indicators				Inner-composition				19th CCDI
Name	Birth	Hanzi	Gov. level (offices held)	18th CC	Ethnicity	Gender	Military	Other	19th PSC	19th POL	19th SEC	19th CMC	19th STC
Yi Xiaoguang	1958	乙晓光	PLA: Commander, Central Theater Command	Alternate	Han	Man	General	—	—	—	—	—	—
Ding Laihang	1957	丁来杭	PLA: Commander, PLA Air Force	New	Han	Man	General	—	—	—	—	—	—
Ding Xuedong	1960	丁学东	PM: Deputy Secretary-General of the State Council	New	Han	Man	—	—	—	—	—	—	—
Ding Xuexiang	1962	丁薛祥	DNL: Director, General Office	Alternate	Han	Man	—	—	—	Member	Member	—	—
Yu Weiguo	1955	于伟国	PM: Secretary, Fujian Provincial Committee	Alternate	Han	Man	—	—	—	—	—	—	—
Yu Zhongfu	1956	于忠福	PLA: Political Commissar, PLA Air Force	New	Han	Man	General	—	—	—	—	—	—
Wan Lijun	1957	万立骏	PM: President, All-China Federation of Returned Overseas Chinese	Alternate	Han	Man	—	—	—	—	—	—	—
Xi Jinping	1953	习近平	NL: General Secretary, Central Committee; Chairman, Central Military Commission; President of the People's Republic of China	Old	Han	Man	—	—	Gen. Sec.	Gen. Sec.	—	Chairman	—
Ma Biao	1954	马飚	DNL: Vice Chairperson of the Chinese People's Political Consultative Conference	Old	Zhuang	Man	—	—	—	—	—	—	—
Ma Xingrui	1959	马兴瑞	PM: Governor, Guangdong Province	Old	Han	Man	—	—	—	—	—	—	—
Wang Ning	1955	王宁	PAP: Commander, People's Armed Police	Alternate	Han	Man	General	—	—	—	—	—	—
Wang Jun	1958	王军	PM: Director, State Administration of Taxation	Alternate	Han	Man	—	—	—	—	—	—	—
Wang Yong	1955	王勇	DNL: State Councilor	Old	Han	Man	—	—	—	—	—	—	—
Wang Chen	1950	王晨	DNL: Vice Chairperson of the National People's Congress	Old	Han	Man	—	—	—	Member	—	—	—
Wang Yi	1953	王毅	DNL: State Councilor; Minister of Foreign Affairs	Old	Han	Man	—	—	—	—	—	—	—
Wang Xiaohong	1957	王小洪	PM: State Councilor; Deputy Minister of Public Security	New	Han	Man	—	—	—	—	—	—	—
Wang Yupu	1956	王玉普	PM: Minister of Emergency Management	Old	Han	Man	—	Died in office	—	—	—	—	—
Wang Zhengwei	1957	王正伟	DNL: Vice Chairperson of the Chinese People's Political Consultative Conference	Old	Hui	Man	—	—	—	—	—	—	—
Wang Dongming	1956	王东明	DNL: Vice Chairperson of the National People's Congress; Chairman, All-China Federation of Trade Unions	Old	Han	Man	—	—	—	—	—	—	—
Wang Dongfeng	1958	王东峰	PM: Secretary, Hebei Provincial Committee	New	Han	Man	—	—	—	—	—	—	—
Wang Ercheng	1955	王尔乘	PM: Secretary, National Council for Social Security Fund	New	Han	Man	—	—	—	—	—	—	—
Wang Zhimin	1957	王志民	PM: Director of the Hong Kong Liaison Office (2017–2020); Deputy Director, Central Party History and Literature Office (2020–)	New	Han	Man	—	—	—	—	—	—	—
Wang Zhigang	1957	王志刚	PM: Minister of Science and Technology	Old	Han	Man	—	—	—	—	—	—	—
Wang Huning	1955	王沪宁	NL: Chairman, Central Guidance Commission on Building Spiritual Civilization	Old	Han	Man	—	—	Member	Member	Member	—	—
Wang Guosheng	1956	王国生	PM: Secretary, Henan Provincial Committee	Old	Han	Man	—	—	—	—	—	—	—
Wang Jianjun	1958	王建军	PM: Secretary, Qinghai Provincial Committee	Old	Han	Man	—	—	—	—	—	—	—
Wang Jianwu	1958	王建武	PLA: Political Commissar, Southern Theater Command	New	Han	Man	Lt. Gen.	—	—	—	—	—	—
Wang Xiaodong	1960	王晓东	PM: Governor, Hubei Province	New	Han	Man	—	—	—	—	—	—	—
Wang Xiaohui	1962	王晓晖	PM: Executive Deputy Head, Propaganda Department	New	Han	Man	—	—	—	—	—	—	—
Wang Jiasheng	1955	王家胜	PLA: Political Commissar, PLA Rocket Force	New	Han	Man	General	—	—	—	—	—	—
Wang Menghui	1960	王蒙徽	PM: Minister of Housing and Urban-Rural Development	New	Han	Man	—	—	—	—	—	—	—
You Quan	1954	尤权	DNL: Director, United Front Work Department	Old	Han	Man	—	—	—	—	Member	—	—
Che Jun	1955	车俊	PM: Secretary, Zhejiang Provincial Committee	Old	Han	Man	—	—	—	—	—	—	—
Yin Li	1962	尹力	PM: Governor, Sichuan Province	Alternate	Han	Man	—	—	—	—	—	—	—
Bayanqolu	1955	巴音朝鲁	PM: Secretary, Jilin Provincial Committee	New	Mongol	Man	—	—	—	—	—	—	—
Bagatur	1955	巴特尔	DNL: Vice Chairperson of the Chinese People's Political Consultative Conference; Chairman, State Ethnic Affairs Commission	Old	Mongol	Man	—	—	—	—	—	—	—
Arken Imirbaki	1953	艾力更·依明巴海	DNL: Vice Chairperson of the National People's Congress	New	Uyghur	Man	—	—	—	—	—	—	—
Shi Taifeng	1956	石泰峰	PM: Secretary, Ningxia Hui Autonomous Regional Committee(2017–2019); Secretary, Inner Mongolia Autonomous Regional Committee (2019–)	Alternate	Han	Man	—	—	—	—	—	—	—
Bu Xiaolin	1958	布小林	PM: Chairwoman, Inner Mongolia Autonomous Region	New	Mongol	Woman	—	—	—	—	—	—	—
Lu Zhangong	1952	卢展工	DNL: Vice Chairperson of the Chinese People's Political Consultative Conference	Old	Han	Man	—	—	—	—	—	—	—
Bai Chunli	1953	白春礼	PM: President, Chinese Academy of Sciences	Old	Manchu	Man	—	—	—	—	—	—	—
Ji Bingxuan	1951	吉炳轩	DNL: Vice Chairperson of the National People's Congress	Old	Han	Man	—	—	—	—	—	—	—
Bi Jingquan	1955	毕井泉	PM: Director, China Food and Drug Administration (2015–2018); Secretary, State Administration for Market Regulation (2018)	New	Han	Man	—	—	—	—	—	—	—
Qu Qingshan	1957	曲青山	PM: Executive Deputy Director, Central Party History and Literature Office (2018–2019); Director, Central Party History and Literature Office (2019–)	New	Han	Man	—	—	—	—	—	—	—
Zhu Shengling	1957	朱生岭	PLA: Political Commissar, People's Armed Police (2017–2019); Political Commissar, Central Theater Command (2019–)	New	Han	Man	General	—	—	—	—	—	—
Liu Qi	1957	刘奇	PM: Secretary, Jiangxi Provincial Committee	New	Han	Man	—	—	—	—	—	—	—
Liu Lei	1957	刘雷	PLA: Political Commissar, PLA Ground Force	New	Han	Man	General	—	—	—	—	—	—
Liu He	1952	刘鹤	DNL: Vice Premier	Old	Han	Man	—	—	—	Member	—	—	—
Liu Shiyu	1961	刘士余	PM: Chairman, China Securities Regulatory Commission (2016–2019); Chairman, All China Federation of Supply and Marketing Cooperatives (2019)	Old	Han	Man	—	Investigated	—	—	—	—	—
Liu Wanlong	1962	刘万龙	PLA: Commander, Xinjiang Military District	Old	Han	Man	Lt. Gen.	—	—	—	—	—	—
Liu Qibao	1953	刘奇葆	DNL: Vice Chairperson of the Chinese People's Political Consultative Conference	Old	Han	Man	—	—	—	—	—	—	—
Liu Guozhong	1962	刘国中	PM: Governor, Jilin Province	New	Han	Man	—	—	—	—	—	—	—
Liu Guozhi	1960	刘国治	PLA: Chairman, Central Military Science and Technology Commission	New	Han	Man	Lt. Gen.	—	—	—	—	—	—
Liu Jinguo	1955	刘金国	DNL: Deputy Secretary, Central Commission for Discipline Inspection	New	Han	Man	—	—	—	—	—	—	Member
Liu Jieyi	1957	刘结一	PM: Director, Taiwan Affairs Office	New	Han	Man	—	—	—	—	—	—	—
Liu Zhenli	1964	刘振立	PLA: Chief of Staff, PLA Ground Force	New	Han	Man	General	—	—	—	—	—	—
Liu Jiayi	1955	刘家义	PM: Secretary, Shandong Provincial Committee	Old	Han	Man	—	—	—	—	—	—	—
Liu Cigui	1955	刘赐贵	PM: Secretary, Hainan Provincial Committee	New	Han	Man	—	—	—	—	—	—	—
Liu Yuejun	1954	刘粤军	PLA: Commander, Eastern Theater Command(2016–2019)	Old	Han	Man	General	—	—	—	—	—	—
Che Dalha	1958	齐扎拉	PM: Chairman, Tibet Autonomous Region	New	Tibetan	Man	—	—	—	—	—	—	—
An Zhaoqing	1957	安兆庆	PAP: Political Commissar, Equipment Development Department (2017–2019); Political Commissar, People's Armed Police (2019–)	New	Xibe	Man	General	—	—	—	—	—	—
Xu Qin	1961	许勤	PM: Governor, Hebei Province	New	Han	Man	—	—	—	—	—	—	—
Xu Yousheng	1957	许又声	PM: Director, Overseas Chinese Affairs Office	New	Han	Man	—	—	—	—	—	—	—
Xu Dazhe	1956	许达哲	PM: Governor, Hunan Province	Old	Han	Man	—	—	—	—	—	—	—
Xu Qiliang	1950	许其亮	DNL: Vice Chairman, Central Military Commission	Old	Han	Man	General	—	—	Member	—	Vice Chair.	—
Ruan Chengfa	1957	阮成发	PM: Governor, Yunnan Province	Alternate	Han	Man	—	—	—	—	—	—	—
Sun Zhigang	1954	孙志刚	PM: Secretary, Guizhou Provincial Committee	New	Han	Man	—	—	—	—	—	—	—
Sun Jinlong	1962	孙金龙	PM: Secretary, Xinjiang Production and Construction Corps Committee	Alternate	Han	Man	—	—	—	—	—	—	—
Sun Shaocheng	1960	孙绍骋	PM: Minister of Veterans Affairs	New	Han	Man	—	—	—	—	—	—	—
Sun Chunlan	1950	孙春兰	DNL: Vice Premier	Old	Han	Woman	—	—	—	Member	—	—	—
Du Jiahao	1955	杜家毫	PM: Secretary, Hunan Provincial Committee	Alternate	Han	Man	—	—	—	—	—	—	—
Li Yi	1960	李屹	PM: Secretary, China Federation of Literary and Art Circles	New	Han	Man	—	—	—	—	—	—	—
Li Xi	1956	李希	DNL: Secretary, Guangdong Provincial Committee	Alternate	Han	Man	—	—	—	Member	—	—	—
Li Bin	1954	李斌	DNL: Vice Chairperson of the Chinese People's Political Consultative Conference	Alternate	Han	Woman	—	—	—	—	—	—	—
Li Qiang	1959	李强	DNL: Secretary, Shanghai Municipal Committee	Old	Han	Man	—	—	—	Member	—	—	—
Li Ganjie	1964	李干杰	PM: Minister of Ecological Environment	New	Han	Man	—	—	—	—	—	—	—
Li Xiaopeng	1959	李小鹏	PM: Minister of Transport	Alternate	Han	Man	—	—	—	—	—	—	—
Li Fengbiao	1959	李凤彪	PLA: Chief of Staff, Central Theater Command(2016–2019); Commander, PLA Strategic Support Force(2019–)	New	Han	Man	General	—	—	—	—	—	—
Li Yufu	1954	李玉赋	PM: Secretary, All-China Federation of Trade Unions	New	Han	Man	—	—	—	—	—	—	—
Li Chuanguang	1954	李传广	PLA: Chief of Staff, PLA Rocket Force	New	Han	Man	Lt. Gen.	—	—	—	—	—	—
Li Jiheng	1957	李纪恒	PM: Secretary, Inner Mongolia Regional Committee (2017–2019); Minister of Civil Affairs (2019–)	Old	Han	Man	—	—	—	—	—	—	—
Li Keqiang	1955	李克强	NL: Premier of the People's Republic of China	Old	Han	Man	—	—	Member	Member	—	—	—
Li Zuocheng	1953	李作成	PLA: Director, CMC Joint Staff Department	New	Han	Man	General	—	—	—	—	Member	—
Li Shangfu	1958	李尚福	PLA: Director, CMC Equipment Development Department	New	Han	Man	General	—	—	—	—	—	—
Li Guoying	1963	李国英	PM: Governor, Anhui Province	Alternate	Han	Man	—	—	—	—	—	—	—
Li Qiaoming	1961	李桥铭	PLA: Commander, Northern Theater Command	New	Han	Man	General	—	—	—	—	—	—
Li Xiaohong	1959	李晓红	PM: President, Chinese Academy of Engineering	New	Han	Man	—	—	—	—	—	—	—
Li Hongzhong	1956	李鸿忠	DNL: Secretary, Tianjin Municipal Committee	Old	Han	Man	—	—	—	Member	—	—	—
Li Jinbin	1958	李锦斌	PM: Secretary, Anhui Provincial Committee	Old	Han	Man	—	—	—	—	—	—	—
Yang Xuejun	1963	杨学军	PLA: President, PLA Academy of Military Science	Alternate	Han	Man	General	—	—	—	—	—	—
Yang Jiechi	1950	杨洁篪	DNL: Director, Office of Foreign Affairs	Old	Han	Man	—	—	—	Member	—	—	—
Yang Zhenwu	1955	杨振武	PM: President, People's Daily (2014-18); Secretary-General of the National People's Congress	New	Han	Man	—	—	—	—	—	—	—
Yang Xiaodu	1953	杨晓渡	DNL: Deputy Secretary, Central Commission for Discipline Inspection; Director, National Supervisory Commission	New	Han	Man	—	—	—	Member	Member	—	Member
Xiao Jie	1957	肖捷	PM: State Councilor; Secretary-General of the State Council	Old	Han	Man	—	—	—	—	—	—	—
Xiao Yaqing	1959	肖亚庆	PM: Chairman, State-owned Assets Supervision and Administration Commission (2016–2019); Director, State Administration for Market Regulation (2019–)	New	Han	Man	—	—	—	—	—	—	—
Wu Shezhou	1958	吴社洲	PLA: Political Commissar, Western Theater Command	New	Han	Man	General	—	—	—	—	—	—
Wu Yingjie	1956	吴英杰	PM: Secretary, Tibet Autonomous Region Committee	New	Han	Man	—	—	—	—	—	—	—
Wu Zhenglong	1964	吴政隆	PM: Governor, Jiangsu Province	Alternate	Han	Man	—	—	—	—	—	—	—
Qiu Xueqiang	1957	邱学强	PM: Vice President, Supreme People's Procuratorate	New	Han	Man	—	—	—	—	—	—	—
He Ping	1957	何平	PLA: Political Commissar, Eastern Theater Command	New	Han	Man	General	—	—	—	—	—	—
He Lifeng	1955	何立峰	DNL: Vice Chairperson of the Chinese People's Political Consultative Conference; Chairman, National Development and Reform Commission	Alternate	Han	Man	—	—	—	—	—	—	—
Ying Yong	1957	应勇	PM: Mayor, Shanghai Municipality (2017–2020); Party Secretary, Hubei Province (2020–)	New	Han	Man	—	—	—	—	—	—	—
Leng Rong	1953	冷溶	PM: Director, Central Party History and Literature Office (2018–2019)	Old	Han	Man	—	—	—	—	—	—	—
Wang Yang	1955	汪洋	NL: Chairperson of the Chinese People's Political Consultative Conference	Old	Han	Man	—	—	Member	Member	—	—	—
Wang Yongqing	1959	汪永清	DNL: Vice Chairperson of the Chinese People's Political Consultative Conference	Old	Han	Man	—	—	—	—	—	—	—
Shen Jinlong	1956	沈金龙	PLA: Commander, PLA Navy	New	Han	Man	Admiral	—	—	—	—	—	—
Shen Xiaoming	1963	沈晓明	PM: Governor, Hainan Province	New	Han	Man	—	—	—	—	—	—	—
Shen Yueyue	1957	沈跃跃	DNL: Vice Chairperson of the National People's Congress	Old	Han	Woman	—	—	—	—	—	—	—
Shen Deyong	1954	沈德咏	PM: Executive Vice-President of the Supreme People's Court (2008–2018)	Old	Han	Man	—	—	—	—	—	—	—
Huai Jinpeng	1962	怀进鹏	PM: Party Secretary, China Association for Science and Technology	New	Han	Man	—	—	—	—	—	—	—
Song Dan	1956	宋丹	PLA: Secretary, Political and Legal Affairs Commission of the Central Military Commission (2017–19)	New	Han	Man	Lt. Gen.	—	—	—	—	—	—
Song Tao	1955	宋涛	PM: Director, International Liaison Department	New	Han	Man	—	—	—	—	—	—	—
Song Xiuyan	1955	宋秀岩	PM: Vice-President, All-China Women's Federation	Old	Han	Woman	—	—	—	—	—	—	—
Zhang Jun	1956	张军	PM: Procurator-General of the Supreme People's Procuratorate	New	Han	Man	—	—	—	—	—	—	—
Zhang Youxia	1950	张又侠	DNL: Vice Chairman, Central Military Commission	Old	Han	Man	General	—	—	Member	—	Vice Chair.	—
Zhang Shengmin	1958	张升民	PLA: Deputy Secretary, Central Commission for Discipline Inspection; Secretary, Commission for Discipline Inspection of the Central Military Commission	New	Han	Man	General	—	—	—	—	Member	Member
Zhang Qingwei	1961	张庆伟	PM: Secretary, Heilongjiang Provincial Committee	Old	Han	Man	—	—	—	—	—	—	—
Zhang Qingli	1951	张庆黎	DNL: Vice Chairperson of the Chinese People's Political Consultative Conference	Old	Han	Man	—	—	—	—	—	—	—
Zhang Jinan	1957	张纪南	PM: Minister of Human Resources and Social Security	New	Han	Man	—	—	—	—	—	—	—
Zhang Guoqing	1964	张国清	PM: Mayor, Chongqing Municipal Committee (2017–2018); Mayor, Tianjin Municipality (2018–)	Old	Han	Man	—	—	—	—	—	—	—
Zhang Chunxian	1953	张春贤	DNL: Vice Chairperson of the National People's Congress	Old	Han	Man	—	—	—	—	—	—	—
Zhang Xiaoming	1963	张晓明	PM: Director, Hong Kong and Macau Affairs Office	Alternate	Han	Man	—	—	—	—	—	—	—
Zhang Yijiong	1955	张裔炯	PM: Executive Deputy Director, United Front Work Department	Old	Han	Man	—	—	—	—	—	—	—
Lu Hao	1967	陆昊	PM: Minister of Natural Resources (2018–)	Old	Han	Man	—	—	—	—	—	—	—
Chen Xi	1953	陈希	DNL: Head, Organization Department; President, Central Party School	Old	Han	Man	—	—	—	Member	Member	—	—
Chen Wu	1954	陈武	PM: Chairman, Guangxi Zhuang Autonomous Region	Old	Zhuang	Man	—	—	—	—	—	—	—
Chen Hao	1954	陈豪	PM: Secretary, Yunnan Provincial Committee	New	Han	Man	—	—	—	—	—	—	—
Chen Wenqing	1960	陈文清	PM: Minister of State Security	Old	Han	Man	—	—	—	—	—	—	—
Chen Jining	1964	陈吉宁	PM: Mayor, Beijing Municipality	Old	Han	Man	—	—	—	—	—	—	—
Chen Quanguo	1955	陈全国	DNL: Secretary, Xinjiang Autonomous Regional Committee	Old	Han	Man	—	—	—	Member	—	—	—
Chen Qiufa	1954	陈求发	DNL: Secretary, Liaoning Provincial Committee	Old	Miao	Man	—	—	—	—	—	—	—
Chen Baosheng	1956	陈宝生	PM: Minister of Education	Old	Han	Man	—	—	—	—	—	—	—
Chen Run'er	1957	陈润儿	PM: Governor of Henan (2017–2019); Secretary, Ningxia Hui Autonomous Regional Committee (2019–)	Alternate	Han	Man	—	—	—	—	—	—	—
Chen Min'er	1960	陈敏尔	DNL: Secretary, Chongqing Municipal Committee	Old	Han	Man	—	—	—	Member	—	—	—
Nurlan Abelmanjen	1962	努尔兰·阿不都满金	PM: Chairman, Xinjiang People's Political Consultative Conference	Alternate	Kazakh	Man	—	—	—	—	—	—	—
Miao Wei	1955	苗圩	PM: Minister of Industry and Information Technology	Old	Han	Man	—	—	—	—	—	—	—
Miao Hua	1955	苗华	PLA: Director, Political Work Department of the Central Military Commission	New	Han	Man	Admiral	—	—	—	—	Member	—
Gou Zhongwen	1957	苟仲文	PM: Director, State General Administration of Sports	New	Han	Man	—	—	—	—	—	—	—
Fan Xiaojun	1956	范骁骏	PLA: Political Commissar, Northern Theater Command	New	Han	Man	General	—	—	—	—	—	—
Lin Duo	1956	林铎	PM: Secretary, Gansu Provincial Committee	Alternate	Han	Man	—	—	—	—	—	—	—
Shang Hong	1960	尚宏	PLA: Director, Space Systems Department of the PLA Strategic Support Force	New	Han	Man	Lt. Gen.	—	—	—	—	—	—
Jin Zhuanglong	1964	金壮龙	PM: Executive Deputy Director, Office of the Military-Civilian Joint Development Commission	Alternate	Han	Man	—	—	—	—	—	—	—
Zhou Qiang	1960	周强	DNL: President, Supreme People's Court	New	Han	Man	—	—	—	—	—	—	—
Zhou Yaning	1957	周亚宁	PLA: Commander, PLA Rocket Force	New	Han	Man	General	—	—	—	—	—	—
Zheng He	1958	郑和	PLA: President, National Defense University of the PLA	New	Han	Man	General	—	—	—	—	—	—
Zheng Weiping	1955	郑卫平	PLA: Political Commissar, Eastern Theater Command	Old	Han	Man	General	—	—	—	—	—	—
Zheng Xiaosong	1959	郑晓松	PM: Director, Macau Liaison Office (2017–2018)	Old	Han	Man	—	Died in office	—	—	—	—	—
Meng Xiangfeng	1964	孟祥锋	PM: Executive Deputy Director, Working Committee of State Organs	Old	Han	Man	—	—	—	—	—	—	—
Zhao Leji	1957	赵乐际	NL: Secretary of the Central Commission for Discipline Inspection	Old	Han	Man	—	—	Member	Member	—	—	Secretary
Zhao Kezhi	1953	赵克志	PM: State Councilor; Minister of Public Security	Old	Han	Man	—	—	—	—	—	—	—
Zhao Zongqi	1955	赵宗岐	PLA: Commander, Western Theater Command	Old	Han	Man	General	—	—	—	—	—	—
Hao Peng	1960	郝鹏	PM: Party Secretary, State-owned Assets Supervision and Administration Commission (2016–); Chairman, State-owned Assets Supervision and Administration Commission (2019–)	Old	Han	Man	—	—	—	—	—	—	—
Hu Heping	1962	胡和平	PM: Secretary, Shaanxi Provincial Committee	Old	Han	Man	—	—	—	—	—	—	—
Hu Zejun	1955	胡泽君	PM: Auditor General of the National Audit Office	Old	Han	Woman	—	—	—	—	—	—	—
Hu Chunhua	1963	胡春华	DNL: Vice Premier of the People's Republic of China	Old	Han	Man	—	—	—	Member	—	—	—
Xian Hui	1958	咸辉	PM: Chairwoman, Ningxia Hui Autonomous Region	Old	Hui	Woman	—	—	—	—	—	—	—
Zhong Shan	1955	钟山	PM: Minister of Commerce	New	Han	Man	—	—	—	—	—	—	—
Xin Chunying	1956	信春鹰	PM: Executive Deputy Secretary-General, Standing Committee of the National People's Congress	New	Han	Woman	—	—	—	—	—	—	—
Hou Jianguo	1959	侯建国	PM: Vice President, Chinese Academy of Sciences	New	Han	Man	—	—	—	—	—	—	—
Lou Qinjian	1956	娄勤俭	PM: Secretary, Jiangsu Provincial Committee	Alternate	Han	Man	—	—	—	—	—	—	—
Losang Jamcan	1957	洛桑江村	PM: President, Tibet Autonomous Region People's Congress	New	Tibetan	Man	—	—	—	—	—	—	—
Luo Huining	1954	骆惠宁	PM: Secretary, Shanxi Provincial Committee (2017–2019); Director of the Hong Kong Liaison Office (2020–)	Old	Han	Man	—	—	—	—	—	—	—
Qin Shengxiang	1957	秦生祥	PLA: Political Commissar, PLA Navy	Old	Han	Man	Admiral	—	—	—	—	—	—
Yuan Jiajun	1962	袁家军	PM: Governor, Zhejiang Province	Old	Han	Man	—	—	—	—	—	—	—
Yuan Yubai	1956	袁誉柏	PLA: Commander, Southern Theater Command	Old	Han	Man	Admiral	—	—	—	—	—	—
Yuan Shuhong	1958	袁曙宏	PM: Secretary, Ministry of Justice	Old	Han	Man	—	—	—	—	—	—	—
Nie Chenxi	1957	聂辰席	PM: Chairman, State Administration of Radio and Television	New	Han	Man	—	—	—	—	—	—	—
Li Zhanshu	1950	栗战书	NL: Chairman of the National People's Congress	Old	Han	Man	—	—	Member	Member	—	—	—
Qian Xiaoqian	1955	钱小芊	PM: Secretary, China Writers Association	New	Han	Man	—	—	—	—	—	—	—
Tie Ning	1957	铁凝	PM: President, China Writers Association	Old	Han	Woman	—	—	—	—	—	—	—
Ni Yuefeng	1964	倪岳峰	PM: Director, General Administration of Customs	Alternate	Han	Man	—	—	—	—	—	—	—
Xu Lin	1963	徐麟	PM: Director, Cyberspace Administration of China (2016–2018); Director, State Council Information Office (2018–)	New	Han	Man	—	—	—	—	—	—	—
Xu Lejiang	1959	徐乐江	PM: Executive Vice Chairman, All-China Federation of Industry and Commerce	Alternate	Han	Man	—	—	—	—	—	—	—
Xu Anxiang	1956	徐安祥	PLA: Commander, Southern Theater Command Air Force (2016–2017); Vice Commander, PLA Air Force (2017–)	Old	Han	Man	Lt. Gen.	—	—	—	—	—	—
Gao Jin	1959	高津	PLA: Commander, PLA Strategic Support Force (2017–19); Director, CMC Logistic Support Department (2019–)	Alternate	Han	Man	General	—	—	—	—	—	—
Guo Shengkun	1954	郭声琨	DNL: Secretary, Central Political and Legal Affairs Commission	Old	Han	Man	—	—	—	Member	Member	—	—
Guo Shuqing	1956	郭树清	PM: Chairman, China Banking and Insurance Regulatory Commission; Secretary, People's Bank of China	Old	Han	Man	—	—	—	—	—	—	—
Tang Renjian	1962	唐仁健	PM: Governor, Gansu Province	New	Han	Man	—	—	—	—	—	—	—
Huang Ming	1958	黄明	PM: Secretary, Ministry of Emergency Management	New	Han	Man	—	—	—	—	—	—	—
Huang Shouhong	1964	黄守宏	PM: Director, State Council Research Office	New	Han	Man	—	—	—	—	—	—	—
Huang Kunming	1956	黄坤明	DNL: Head, Propaganda Department	Alternate	Han	Man	—	—	—	Member	Member	—	—
Huang Shuxian	1954	黄树贤	PM: Minister of Civil Affairs	Old	Han	Man	—	—	—	—	—	—	—
Cao Jianming	1955	曹建明	DNL: Vice Chairperson of the National People's Congress	Old	Han	Man	—	—	—	—	—	—	—
Gong Zheng	1960	龚正	PM: Governor, Shandong Province (2017–2020); Mayor, Shanghai Municipality (2020–)	New	Han	Man	—	—	—	—	—	—	—
Sheng Bin	1958	盛斌	PLA: Director, National Defense Mobilization Department	New	Han	Man	Lt. Gen.	—	—	—	—	—	—
Shohrat Zakir	1953	雪克来提·扎克尔	PM: Chairman, Xinjiang Uyghur Autonomous Region	New	Uyghur	Man	—	—	—	—	—	—	—
E Jingping	1956	鄂竟平	PM: Minister of Water Resources	Alternate	Han	Man	—	—	—	—	—	—	—
Lu Xinshe	1956	鹿心社	PM: Secretary, Guangxi Zhuang Autonomous Region Committee	Old	Han	Man	—	—	—	—	—	—	—
Shen Yiqin	1959	谌贻琴	PM: Governor, Guizhou Province	Alternate	Bai	Woman	—	—	—	—	—	—	—
Peng Qinghua	1957	彭清华	PM: Secretary, Sichuan Provincial Committee	Old	Han	Man	—	—	—	—	—	—	—
Jiang Chaoliang	1957	蒋超良	PM: Secretary, Hubei Provincial Committee (–2020)	Alternate	Han	Man	—	—	—	—	—	—	—
Han Zheng	1954	韩正	NL: Executive Vice Premier of the People's Republic of China	Old	Han	Man	—	—	Member	Member	—	—	—
Han Weiguo	1956	韩卫国	PLA: Commander, PLA Ground Force	New	Han	Man	General	—	—	—	—	—	—
Han Changfu	1954	韩长赋	PM: Minister of Agriculture and Rural Affairs	Old	Han	Man	—	—	—	—	—	—	—
Fu Zhenghua	1955	傅政华	PM: Minister of Justice	New	Han	Man	—	—	—	—	—	—	—
Xie Fuzhan	1954	谢伏瞻	PM: President, Chinese Academy of Social Sciences	Old	Han	Man	—	—	—	—	—	—	—
Lou Yangsheng	1959	楼阳生	PM: Governor, Shanxi Province	New	Han	Man	—	—	—	—	—	—	—
Cai Qi	1955	蔡奇	DNL: Secretary, Beijing Municipal Committee	New	Han	Man	—	—	—	Member	—	—	—
Cai Mingzhao	1955	蔡名照	PM: President, Xinhua News Agency	Old	Han	Man	—	—	—	—	—	—	—
Luo Shugang	1955	雒树刚	PM: Minister of Culture and Tourism	Old	Han	Man	—	—	—	—	—	—	—
Li Huohui	1963	黎火辉	PLA: Director, Training and Administration Department	New	Han	Man	Lt. Gen.	—	—	—	—	—	—
Pan Ligang	1956	潘立刚	PM: Executive Deputy Secretary-General, Chinese People's Political Consultative Conference	New	Han	Man	—	—	—	—	—	—	—
Mu Hong	1956	穆虹	PM: Deputy Director, National Development and Reform Commission	New	Han	Man	—	—	—	—	—	—	—
Wei Fenghe	1953	魏凤和	PLA: Minister of National Defense	Old	Han	Man	General	—	—	—	—	Member	—

=== Alternates ===
Rank	Name	Birth	Hanzi	Gov. level (offices held)	18th CC	Indicators			
Rank	Name	Birth	Hanzi	Gov. level (offices held)	18th CC	Ethnicity	Gender	Military	Other
1	Ma Zhengwu	1963	马正武	SOE: Secretary, China Railway Material Group	New	Han	Male	—	Elevated to full
2	Ma Weiming	1960	马伟明	PLA: Professor, PLA Naval University of Engineering	Old	Han	Male	Maj. Gen.	Elevated to full
3	Ma Guoqiang	1963	马国强	DPM: Secretary, Wuhan Municipal Committee Deputy Secretary, Hubei Provincial Committee	New	Hui	Male	—	Elevated to full
4	Wang Ning	1961	王宁	DPM: Secretary, Fuzhou Municipal Committee Deputy Secretary, Fujian Provincial Committee	Old	Han	Male	—	Elevated to full
5	Wang Yongkang	1963	王永康	DPM: Secretary, Xi'an Municipal Committee	New	Han	Male	—	—
6	Wang Weizhong	1962	王伟中	DPM: Secretary, Shenzhen Municipal Committee Deputy Secretary, Guangdong Provincial Committee	New	Han	Male	—	Elevated to full
7	Wang Xudong	1967	王旭东	DPM: Director, Dunhuang Research Academy (2017–2019); Director, Palace Museum (2019–)	New	Han	Male	—	—
8	Wang Xiubin	1964	王秀斌	PLA: Commander, 80th Group Army	New	Han	Male	Maj. Gen.	—
9	Wang Junzheng	1963	王君正	DPM: Secretary, Changchun Municipal Committee	New	Han	Male	—	—
10	Wang Chunning	1962	王春宁	PLA: Commander, Beijing Garrison	New	Han	Male	Lt. Gen.	—
11	Feng Jianhua	1958	冯建华	PLA: Director, Political Department of the PLA Strategic Support Force	New	Han	Male	Lt. Gen.	—
12	Qumu Shiha	1960	曲木史哈	DPM: Chairman, Sichuan Provincial Commission on Rural Affairs	New	Yi	Male	—	—
13	Ren Xuefeng	1965	任学锋	DPM: Secretary, Guangzhou Municipal Committee (2017–2018); Deputy Secretary, Guangdong Provincial Committee (2017–2018); Deputy Secretary, Chongqing Municipal Committee (2018–2019)	Old	Han	Male	—	Died in office
14	Liu Ning	1962	刘宁	PM: Governor, Qinghai province	New	Han	Male	—	—
15	Liu Faqing	1964	刘发庆	PLA: Deputy Commander, PLA Ground Force	New	Han	Male	Maj. Gen.	—
16	Liu Xiaokai	1962	刘晓凯	PM: Chairman, Guizhou People's Political Consultative Conference	Old	Miao	Male	—	—
17	Yan Jinhai	1962	严金海	DPM: Vice Governor, Qinghai province	New	Tibetan	Male	—	—
18	Yan Zhichan	1964	严植婵	DPM: Vice Chairman, Guangxi Zhuang Autonomous Region	New	Han	Woman	—	—
19	Li Qun	1962	李群	DPM: Vice Minister of Culture and Tourism	Old	Han	Male	—	—
20	Li Jinghao	1961	李景浩	DPM: Head, Jilin Provincial United Front Department	New	Korean	Male	—	—
21	Yang Ning	1963	杨宁	DPM: Head, Yunnan Provincial United Front Department (2017–2018) Deputy Director, General Administration of Sport	New	Bai	Woman	—	—
22	Yang Wei	1963	杨伟	CASS: Aircraft Designer (no public office)	New	Han	Male	—	—
23	Xiao Yingzi	1963	肖莺子	DPM: Head, Yunnan Provincial Propaganda Department	New	Zhuang	Woman	—	—
24	Wu Qiang	1966	吴强	DPM: Vice Governor, Guizhou province	New	Dong	Male	—	—
25	Wu Cunrong	1963	吴存荣	DPM: Secretary, Liangjiang New Area	New	Han	Male	—	—
26	Wu Jieming	1958	吴杰明	PLA: Commissar, PLA National Defence University	New	Han	Male	Lt. Gen.	—
27	Wu Shenghua	1966	吴胜华	DPL: Governor, Qiannan Buyei and Miao Autonomous Prefecture	New	Bouyei	Male	—	—
28	Zou Ming	1964	邹铭	DPM: Head, Guangdong Provincial Organization Department	New	Han	Male	—	—
29	Shen Chunyao	1960	沈春耀	PM: Chair, Committee on the Hong Kong Basic Law of the National People's Congress	New	Han	Male	—	—
30	Song Guoquan	1960	宋国权	DPM: Secretary, Hefei Municipal Committee	New	Han	Male	—	—
31	Zhang Guangjun	1965	张广军	DPM: President, Southeast University	New	Han	Male	—	—
32	Zhang Yuzhuo	1962	张玉卓	DPM: Secretary, Binhai New Area	New	Han	Male	—	—
33	Zhang Zhifen	1966	张志芬	PLA: Commander, Jiuquan Satellite Launch Center	New	Han	Male	Maj. Gen.	—
34	Zhang Zhenzhong	1961	张振中	PLA: Deputy Commander, PLA Rocket Force	New	Han	Male	Lt. Gen.	—
35	Zhang Jinghua	1963	张敬华	DPM: Secretary, Nanjing Committee	New	Han	Male	—	—
36	Chen Gang	1965	陈刚	DPM: Secretary, Xiong'an New Area Committee	Old	Han	Male	—	—
37	Chen Yixin	1959	陈一新	DPM: Secretary, Wuhan Committee	New	Han	Male	—	—
38	Chen Haibo	1962	陈海波	DPM: Deputy Secretary, Heilongjiang Province	New	Han	Male	—	—
39	Lin Shaochun	1962	林少春	DPM: Executive Vice Governor, Guangdong Province	New	Han	Male	—	—
40	Hang Yihong	1962	杭义洪	DPM: President, Chinese Academy of Engineering Physics	New	Han	Male	—	—
41	Ouyang Xiaoping	1961	欧阳晓平	CASS: Scientist (no public office)	New	Han	Male	—	—
42	Norbu Dondrup	1960	罗布顿珠	DPM: Executive Vice Chairman, Tibet Autonomous Region	New	Tibetan	Male	—	—
43	Luo Hongjiang	1962	罗红江	DPL: Prefectural Governor, Xishuangbanna	New	Dai	Male	—	—
44	Luo Qingyu	1963	罗清宇	DPM: Secretary, Taiyuan Municipal Committee	New	Han	Male	—	—
45	Jin Donghan	1961	金东寒	DPM: Secretary, Shanghai University	Old	Han	Male	—	—
46	Zhou Bo	1962	周波	DPM: Executive Vice-Mayor of Shanghai	New	Han	Male	—	—
47	Zhou Qi	1970	周琪	CASS: Director, Institute of Zoology at the Chinese Academy of Sciences	Old	Han	Male	—	—
48	Zhou Naixiang	1961	周乃翔	DPM: Secretary, Suzhou Municipal Committee	New	Han	Male	—	—
49	Guan Qing	1964	官庆	SOE: Chairman, China State Construction Engineering (2017–2019)	New	Han	Male	—	Died in office
50	Zhao Yupei	1954	赵玉沛	DPM: President, Peking Union Medical College Hospital	Old	Han	Male	—	—
51	Zhao Aiming	1961	赵爱明	DPM: Head, Jiangxi Provincial Organization Department	New	Han	Woman	—	—
52	Zhao Deming	1963	赵德明	DPM: Secretary, Guiyang Municipal Committee	New	Yao	Male	—	—
53	Hao Ping	1959	郝平	DPM: President, Peking University	New	Han	Male	—	—
54	Hu Wenrong	1964	胡文容	DPM: Head, Chongqing Municipal Organization Department	New	Han	Male	—	—
55	Hu Henghua	1963	胡衡华	DPM: Secretary, Changsha Municipal Committee	New	Han	Male	—	—
56	Duan Chunhua	1959	段春华	PM: Chairman, Tianjin Municipal People's Congress	Old	Han	Male	—	—
57	Yu Guang	1958	禹光	PLA: Deputy Political Commissar, PLA Rocket Force	Old	Han	Male	Lt. Gen.	—
58	Jiang Zhigang	1960	姜志刚	DPM: Secretary, Yinchuan Municipal Committee; Deputy Secretary, Ningxia Autonomous Regional Committee	New	Han	Male	—	—
59	He Dongfeng	1966	贺东风	SOE: Secretary and Chairman, Comac	New	Han	Male	—	—
60	He Junke	1969	贺军科	PM: First Secretary, Communist Youth League of China	New	Han	Male	—	—
61	Jia Yumei	1963	贾玉梅	DPM: Vice Governor, Heilongjiang Province	New	Han	Woman	—	—
62	Xu Zhongbo	1960	徐忠波	PLA: Political Commissar of the Joint Logistics Support Force	New	Han	Male	Lt. Gen.	—
63	Xu Hairong	1964	徐海荣	DPM: Secretary, Urumqi Municipal Committee	New	Han	Male	—	—
64	Xu Xinrong	1962	徐新荣	DPM: Secretary, Yan'an Municipal Committee	New	Han	Male	—	—
65	Gao Guangbin	1963	高广滨	DPM: Deputy Secretary, Jilin Provincial Committee	Old	Han	Male	—	—
66	Guo Dongming	1959	郭东明	DPM: President, Dalian University of Technology	New	Han	Male	—	—
67	Tang Yijun	1961	唐一军	PM: Governor of Liaoning Province	New	Han	Male	—	—
68	Tang Dengjie	1964	唐登杰	PM: Governor of Fujian Province	New	Han	Male	—	—
69	Huang Minqiang	1960	黄民强	PLA: Professor, 58th Research Institute of the Strategic Support Force	New	Han	Male	Lt. Gen.	—
70	Huang Guoxian	1962	黄国显	PLA: Commander, Eastern Theater Command	New	Han	Male	Lt. Gen.	—
71	Huang Lixin	1962	黄莉新	PM: Chair, Jiangsu People's Political Consultative Conference	Old	Han	Woman	—	—
72	Huang Xiaowei	1961	黄晓薇	PM: Chair, Shanxi People's Political Consultative Conference	New	Han	Woman	—	—
73	Cao Jianguo	1963	曹建国	SOE: Chairman, Aero Engine Corporation of China	New	Han	Male	—	—
74	Chang Dingqiu	1967	常丁求	PLA: Deputy Chief, Joint Staff Department of the Central Military Commission	New	Han	Male	Lt. Gen.	—
75	Cui Yuzhong	1964	崔玉忠	PLA: Commander, Air Force of the East Sea Fleet	New	Han	Male	Maj. Gen.	—
76	Ma Zhenjun	1962	麻振军	PLA: Chief of Staff, PLA Air Force	New	Han	Male	Lt. Gen.	—
77	Liang Tiangeng	1960	梁田庚	DPM: Head, Hebei Provincial Organizational Department	New	Han	Male	—	—
78	Kou Wei	1961	寇伟	SOE: Chairman, State Grid	New	Bai	Male	—	—
79	Peng Jinhui	1964	彭金辉	DPM: Head, Hainan Provincial Organizational Department	New	Yi	Male	—	—
80	Cheng Lianyuan	1961	程连元	DPM: Secretary, Kunming Committee	New	Han	Male	—	—
81	Fu Xingguo	1960	傅兴国	DPM: Director, State Civil Service Administration	New	Han	Male	—	—
82	Xie Chuntao	1963	谢春涛	DPM: Vice President, Chinese Academy of Governance	New	Han	Male	—	—
83	Lan Tianli	1962	蓝天立	PM: Chairman, Guangxi People's Political Consultative Conference	Old	Zhuang	Male	—	—
84	Cai Jianjiang	1965	蔡剑江	SOE: Chairman, Air China	New	Han	Male	—	—
85	Pei Jinjia	1963	裴金佳	DPM: Deputy Director, Taiwan Affairs Office	New	Han	Male	—	—
86	Tan Zuojun	1968	谭作钧	DPM: Secretary, Dalian Committee	New	Han	Male	—	—
87	Dai Houliang	1963	戴厚良	SOE: Chairman, Sinopec	New	Han	Male	—	—
88	Yu Shaoliang	1964	于绍良	DPM: Head, Shanghai Municipal Organization Department	New	Han	Male	—	—
89	Ma Shunqing	1963	马顺清	DPM: Executive Deputy Mayor, Tianjin	Old	Hui	Male	—	—
90	Wang Hong	1963	王宏	DPM: Director, State Oceanic Administration	New	Han	Male	—	—
91	Wang Zhaoli	1962	王兆力	DPM: Secretary, Harbin Municipal Committee	New	Han	Male	—	—
92	Wang Jingqing	1958	王京清	PM: Vice President, Chinese Academy of Social Sciences	New	Han	Male	—	—
93	Wang Xiaoyun	1968	王晓云	SOE: Director, Research Institute at China Mobile	New	Han	Woman	—	—
94	Wang Endong	1966	王恩东	POE: Chief Scientist, Inspur	New	Han	Male	—	—
95	Fang Xiang	1959	方向	PLA: Political Commissar, PLA Academy of Military Science	New	Han	Male	Lt. Gen.	—
96	Kong Changsheng	1963	孔昌生	DPM: Head, Henan Provincial Organization Department	New	Han	Male	—	—
97	Deng Xiaogang	1960	邓小刚	PLA: President, National University of Defense Technology	New	Han	Male	Maj. Gen.	—
98	Erkin Tuniyaz	1961	艾尔肯·吐尼亚孜	DPM: Vice Chairman, Xinjiang Uyghur Autonomous Region	New	Uyghur	Male	—	—
99	Shi Zhenglu	1958	石正露	PLA: Chief of Staff, Northern Theater Command	New	Han	Male	Lt. Gen.	—
100	Shen Changyu	1963	申长雨	DPM: Director, National Intellectual Property Administration	New	Han	Male	—	—
101	Feng Zhenglin	1957	冯正霖	PM: Director, Civil Aviation Administration of China	New	Han	Male	—	—
102	Lü Jun	1967	吕军	SOE: Chairman, COFCO Group	New	Han	Male	—	—
103	Li Jia	1961	李佳	PM: Chairman, Inner Mongolia People's Political Consultative Conference	Old	Han	Male	—	—
104	Li Yuchao	1962	李玉超	PLA: Commander, 96603 Regiment	New	Han	Male	Maj. Gen.	—
105	Li Xiaobo	1963	李晓波	DPM: Mayor of Taiyuan	New	Han	Male	—	—
106	Yang Guangyue	1961	杨光跃	PAP: Deputy Commander, People's Armed Police	New	Naxi	Male	Lt. Gen.	—
107	Wu Zhaohui	1966	吴朝晖	DPM: President, Zhejiang University	New	Han	Male	—	—
108	He Yaling	1963	何雅玲	CASS: Professor; Scientist	New	Han	Woman	—	—
109	Zhang Gong	1961	张工	MAO: Vice Chairman, All-China Federation of Trade Unions	New	Han	Male	—	—
110	Zhang Jiangting	1961	张江汀	DPM: Secretary, Qingdao Municipal Committee	New	Han	Male	—	—
111	Zhang Fuhai	1964	张福海	DPM: Head, Liaoning Provincial Propaganda Department	New	Han	Male	—	—
112	Chen Xu	1963	陈旭	DPM: Secretary, Tsinghua University Committee	New	Han	Woman	—	—
113	Chen Siqing	1960	陈四清	SOE: Chairman, Bank of China	New	Han	Male	—	—
114	Fan Ruiping	1966	范锐平	DPM: Secretary, Chengdu Municipal Committee	New	Han	Male	—	—
115	Yi Gang	1958	易纲	PM: Governor, People's Bank of China	New	Han	Male	—	—
116	Yi Huiman	1964	易会满	PM: Chairman, China Securities Regulatory Commission	New	Han	Male	—	—
117	Yi Lianhong	1959	易炼红	PM: Governor of Jiangxi	New	Han	Male	—	—
118	Zhao Huan	1963	赵欢	SOE: Chairman, China Development Bank	New	Han	Male	—	—
119	Zhao Yide	1965	赵一德	DPM: Deputy Secretary, Hebei Provincial Committee	New	Han	Male	—	—
120	Zhong Denghua	1963	钟登华	DPM: President, Tianjin University	New	Han	Male	—	—
121	Xin Changxing	1963	信长星	DPM: Deputy Secretary, Anhui Provincial Committee	New	Han	Male	—	—
122	Shi Xiaolin	1969	施小琳	DPM: Head, Jiangxi Provincial Propaganda Department	New	Han	Woman	—	—
123	Qian Zhimin	1960	钱智民	SOE: Chairman, State Power Investment Corporation	Old	Han	Male	—	—
124	Guo Mingyi	1958	郭明义	MAO: Vice Chairman, All-China Federation of Trade Unions; Factory worker	Old	Han	Male	—	—
125	Tang Huajun	1960	唐华俊	DPM: President, Chinese Academy of Agricultural Sciences	New	Han	Male	—	—
126	Tang Liangzhi	1960	唐良智	PM: Mayor of Chongqing	New	Han	Male	—	—
127	Huang Zhixian	1956	黄志贤	MAO: Chairman, All-China Federation of Taiwan Compatriots	New	Han	Male	—	—
128	Ge Huijun	1963	葛慧君	PM: Chair, Zhejiang People's Political Consultative Conference	Old	Han	Woman	—	—
129	Jing Junhai	1960	景俊海	PM: Governor of Jilin Province	New	Han	Male	—	—
130	Cheng Lihua	1965	程丽华	DPM: Vice Minister of Finance	New	Han	Woman	—	—
131	Fu Ziying	1957	傅自应	PM: International Trade Representative (2017–2018); Director, Macau Liaison Office	New	Han	Male	—	—
132	Jiao Yanlong	1960	焦彦龙	DPM: Head, Hebei Provincial Propaganda Department	New	Han	Male	—	—
133	Lei Fanpei	1963	雷凡培	SOE: Chairman, China State Shipbuilding Corporation	New	Han	Male	—	—
134	Shen Haixiong	1967	慎海雄	SOE: President, China Media Group	New	Han	Male	—	—
135	Cai Songtao	1974	蔡松涛	DPL: Secretary, Lankao County	New	Han	Male	—	—
136	Yan Xiaodong	1960	颜晓东	PAP: Deputy Political Commissar, People's Armed Police	New	Han	Male	Lt. Gen.	—
137	Pan Gongsheng	1963	潘功胜	DPM: Director, State Administration of Foreign Exchange	New	Han	Male	—	—
138	Ma Tingli	1963	马廷礼	DPM: Head, Gansu Provincial United Front Department	New	Hui	Male	—	—
139	Wang Hai	1960	王海	PLA: Commander, South Sea Fleet	New	Han	Male	V. Adm	—
140	Wang Xi	1966	王曦	MAO: Vice President, China Association for Science and Technology	New	Han	Male	—	—
141	Wang Yinfang	1962	王印芳	PLA: Deputy Commander, Northern Theater Command	New	Han	Male	Maj. Gen.	—
142	Wang Yanling	1962	王艳玲	DPM: Head, Hebei Provincial Propaganda Department	New	Han	Woman	—	—
143	Mao Wanchun	1961	毛万春	PM: Chairman, Hainan People's Political Consultative Conference	Demoted	Han	Male	—	—
144	Ulan	1962	乌兰	DPM: Deputy Secretary, Hunan Provincial Committee	Old	Mongol	Woman	—	—
145	Yin Hong	1963	尹弘	DPM: Deputy Secretary, Shanghai Municipal Committee	New	Han	Male	—	—
146	Tian Guoli	1960	田国立	SOE: Chairman, China Construction Bank	New	Han	Male	—	—
147	Le Yucheng	1963	乐玉成	DPM: Vice Minister of Foreign Affairs	New	Han	Male	—	—
148	Liu Shiquan	1963	刘石泉	CASS: Rocket scientist	Old	Han	Male	—	—
149	Sun Dawei	1963	孙大伟	DPM: Deputy Secretary, Guangxi Autonomous Regional Committee	New	Han	Male	—	—
150	Yin Hejun	1963	阴和俊	DPM: Deputy Secretary, Tianjin Committee	New	Han	Male	—	—
151	Chen Qing	1960	陈青	DPM: Head, Gansu Provincial Propaganda Department	New	Han	Woman	—	—
152	Hu Changsheng	1963	胡昌升	DPM: Head, Fujian Provincial Organization Department	New	Han	Male	—	—
153	Cao Shumin	1966	曹淑敏	DPM: Secretary, Beihang University	Old	Han	Woman	—	—
154	Miao Jianmin	1965	缪建民	SOE: Secretary of the People's Insurance Company of China; Chairman of the People's Insurance Company of China	New	Han	Male	—	—
155	Wei Gang	1960	魏钢	PLA: Commander, East Sea Fleet	New	Han	Male	V. Adm	—
156	Wang Jiong	1964	王炯	PM: Chairman, Chongqing People's Political Consultative Conference	New	Han	Male	—	—
157	Wang Wentao	1964	王文涛	PM: Governor of Heilongjiang Province	Old	Han	Male	—	—
158	Mao Weiming	1961	毛伟明	DPM: Executive Vice Governor, Jiangxi Province	New	Han	Male	—	—
159	Deng Xiaogang	1967	邓小刚	DPM: Deputy Secretary, Sichuan Provincial Committee	New	Han	Male	—	—
160	Ren Hongbin	1963	任洪斌	DPM: Deputy Director, State-owned Assets Supervision and Administration Commission	Old	Han	Male	—	—
161	Li Jing	1962	李静	DPM: Head, Chongqing Municipal United Front Department	New	Han	Woman	—	—
162	Li Yinghong	1963	李应红	PLA: Aerospace scientist; Professor	New	Han	Male	Maj. Gen.	—
163	Wu Xiaoguang	1960	吴晓光	CASS: Aircraft carrier designer	New	Han	Male	—	—
164	Song Yushui	1966	宋鱼水	DPM: Head, Political Department of the Beijing Court of Intellectual Property	New	Han	Woman	—	—
165	Tuo Zhen	1959	庹震	DPM: Chief Editor, People's Daily	New	Han	Male	—	—
166	Pan Yue	1960	潘岳	PM: Executive Vice President, Central Academy of Socialism	New	Han	Male	—	—
167	Ding Yexian	1960	丁业现	DPM: Executive Deputy Secretary, Tibet Autonomous Region Committee	New	Han	Male	—	—
168	Wang Lixia	1964	王莉霞	DPM: Head, Inner Mongolia Regional United Front Department	New	Mongol	Woman	—	—
169	Ning Jizhe	1956	宁吉喆	PM: Director, National Bureau of Statistics	New	Han	Male	—	—
170	Yang Jincheng	1963	杨金成	SOE: Chief Executive, China State Shipbuilding Corporation	New	Han	Male	—	—
171	Shu Qing	1964	舒庆	DPM: Vice Governor, Henan Province	New	Manchu	Male	—	—
172	Yao Zengke	1960	姚增科	PM: Chairman, Jiangxi People's Political Consultative Conference	New	Han	Male	—	—
