= Yuan Shuhong =

Chinese politician

- 袁曙宏

Party Branch Secretary of the Ministry of Justice
- In office March 2018 – August 2021
- Preceded by: Zhang Jun
- Succeeded by: Tang Yijun

Personal details
- Born: July 1958 (age 68) Shucheng County, Anhui, China
- Party: Chinese Communist Party
- Education: Anhui University; Peking University

Yuan Shuhong (Chinese: 袁曙宏; pinyin: Yuán Shǔhóng; born July 1958) is a Chinese politician who served as party branch secretary of the Ministry of Justice from 2018 to 2021. He was a representative of the 19th National Congress of the Chinese Communist Party. He is a member of the 19th Central Committee of the Chinese Communist Party. He was a member of the 13th National Committee of the Chinese People's Political Consultative Conference.

== Biography ==
Yuan was born in Shucheng County, Anhui, in July 1958. After resuming the college entrance examination in 1977, he entered Anhui University, majoring in Chinese language and literature. After graduation, he taught at the university. He joined the Chinese Communist Party (CCP) in May 1985. In 1990, he was admitted to Peking University, earning his doctor's degree in laws under the supervision of Luo Haocai and Xiao Weiyun. After graduation, he became a part-time professor at Peking University.

He joined the faculty of the Chinese Academy of Governance in 1997, and rose to become vice president in August 2003, a position at vice-ministerial level. He was promoted to be deputy director of the Legislative Affairs Office of the State Council in April 2009, concurrently holding the party branch secretary position since February 2017. In March 2018, he was appointed party branch secretary and deputy minister of Justice, but resigned for health reasons in August 2021. In September 2021, he took office as vice chairperson of the Education, Science, Health and Sports Committee of the Chinese People's Political Consultative Conference.

Party political offices
| Preceded by Song Dahan | Party Branch Secretary of the Legislative Affairs Office of the State Council; 2017–2018 | Succeeded by Position revoked |
Government offices
| Preceded by Zhang Jun | Party Branch Secretary of the Ministry of Justice; 2018–2021 | Succeeded by Tang Yijun |
