= Song Dan =

Song Dan, may refer to:

- Song Dan (javelin thrower), Chinese javelin thrower
- Song Dan (general), Chinese general
