= Office of Legislative Affairs =

Office of Legislative Affairs may refer to:

- Office of Legislative Affairs (United States Navy), coordinates relationship between U.S. Congress and U.S. Department of the Navy
- Bureau of Legislative Affairs, coordinates relationship between U.S. Congress and U.S. Department of State
- U.S. Department of Justice Office of Legislative Affairs, coordinates relationship between U.S. Congress and U.S. Department of Justice
- White House Office of Legislative Affairs, coordinates relationship between U.S. Congress and the White House
- New York State Department of Environmental Conservation, Office of Legislative Affairs, coordinates relationship between New York State legislature and New York State Department of Environmental Conservation
- Legislative Affairs Office, in China, office in the State Council assists the Premier in providing legal advice and administrative laws to govern the behavior of government departments
