= Luo Xi =

Luo Xi is the name of:

- Luo Xi (banker) (born 1960), senior executive vice president of Industrial and Commercial Bank of China
- Luo Xi (synchronised swimmer, born 1969), Chinese synchronised swimmer
- Luo Xi (synchronised swimmer, born 1987), Chinese synchronised swimmer
