= Jin Donghan =

Chinese politician

- 金东寒

President of Tianjin University
- In office May 2019 – January 2025
- Preceded by: Zhong Denghua
- Succeeded by: Chai Liyuan

Communist Party Secretary of Shanghai University
- In office September 2017 – May 2019
- Preceded by: Luo Hongjie
- Succeeded by: Cheng Danhong

President of Shanghai University
- In office July 2015 – September 2017
- Preceded by: Luo Hongjie
- Succeeded by: Liu Changsheng

Personal details
- Born: 11 January 1961 (age 65) Suihua, Heilongjiang, China
- Party: Chinese Communist Party (expelled in 2026)
- Education: Wuhan University of Technology
- Scientific career
- Fields: Marine machinery
- Workplaces: Shanghai University; Tianjin University

Chinese name
- Simplified Chinese: 金东寒
- Traditional Chinese: 金東寒
Transcriptions
Standard Mandarin
- Hanyu Pinyin: Jīn Dōnghán

Jin Donghan (Chinese: 金东寒; born 1961) is a Chinese ship engineer who served as the president of Tianjin University. He was an alternate member of the 18th Central Committee of the Chinese Communist Party and 19th Central Committee of the Chinese Communist Party.

== Biography ==
Jin graduated from Wuhan Institute of Marine Engineering (now part of Wuhan University of Technology) in 1982, majored in internal-combustion engineering. Jin received the National May 1 Labour Medal in 2003, and the first prize of National Science and Technology Progress Award in 2006. He was elected a member of the Chinese Academy of Engineering in 2009. In 2015, he was appointed as the president of Shanghai University. In 2017, he was appointed as the party secretary of Shanghai University (still the president). In 2019, he was appointed as the president of Tianjin University.

=== Downfall ===
On 4 January 2026, Jin's qualification for delegates to the Tianjin Municipal Congress was terminated. The next day, he was removed from the list of the Chinese Academy of Engineering. On 29 October 2026, the fifth plenary session of the 20th CCP Central Committee reviewed and approved the report of the Central Commission for Discipline Inspection on the "serious violations of discipline and law" by Jin and confirmed the Politburo decision to expel him from the CCP.

Educational offices
Preceded by Luo Hongjie	President of Shanghai University; 2015–2017	Succeeded by Liu Changsheng
Preceded by Zhong Denghua	President of Tianjin University; 2019–2025	Succeeded by Chai Liyuan
Party political offices
Preceded by Luo Hongjie	Communist Party Secretary of Shanghai University; 2017–2019	Succeeded by Cheng Danhong
