= Xia Weidong =

Chinese politician

- 夏伟东

President of Qiushi
- In office 2018 – October 2023
- Preceded by: Li Jie
- Succeeded by: Chen Yangyong

Personal details
- Born: January 1960 (age 66) Suzhou, Anhui, China
- Party: Chinese Communist Party
- Education: Renmin University of China

Chinese name
- Simplified Chinese: 夏伟东
- Traditional Chinese: 夏偉東
Transcriptions
Standard Mandarin
- Hanyu Pinyin: Xià Wěidōng

Xia Weidong (Chinese: 夏伟东; born January 1960) is a Chinese ethicist and politician who was president of Qiushi from 2018 to 2023. He is a professor and doctoral supervisor at the Renmin University of China, a researcher at the Moral Education Research Center of Tsinghua University, vice president of the Chinese Ethics Society, and vice president of the Chinese Historical Materialism Society.

He was a representative of the 19th and is a representative of the 20th National Congress of the Chinese Communist Party. He was a delegate to the 13th National People's Congress and a member of the Standing Committee of the 13th National People's Congress.

== Early life and education ==
Xia was born in Suzhou, Anhui, in January 1960. In 1988, he graduated from the Department of Philosophy and Ethics, Renmin University of China with a Ph.D. in philosophy.

== Career ==
He successively served as deputy editor in chief of Qiushi, full-time deputy director of the Central Civilization Office, deputy secretary-general of the Publicity Department of the Chinese Communist Party, director of the Theoretical Bureau, and president of Qiushi.

== Publications ==
- 道德的历史与现实 [The History and Reality of Morality] (in Chinese). Beijing: Education Science Press. 2000. ISBN 9787504120137.
- 思想道德修养 [Ideology and Morality] (in Chinese). Beijing: China Renmin University Press. 2003. ISBN 9787300045887.

Party political offices
Preceded by Li Jie	President of Qiushi; 2018–2023	Succeeded by Chen Yangyong
