= Liang Bin =

Chinese politician (born 1956)

- 梁滨

Head of Organization Department of the Hebei Provincial Party Committee
- In office June 2008 – November 2014
- Preceded by: Che Jun
- Succeeded by: Liang Tiangeng

Vice-Governor of Shanxi
- In office 2003–2006
- Governor: Yu Youjun

Communist Party Secretary of Shuozhou
- In office October 2001 – February 2003
- Preceded by: Lai Yulong
- Succeeded by: Yan Qinsheng

Communist Party Secretary of Xinzhou
- In office September 2000 – October 2001
- Preceded by: New title
- Succeeded by: Lü Degong

Personal details
- Born: April 1956 (age 70) Xiaoyi, Shanxi, China
- Party: Chinese Communist Party (1979–2015; expelled)
- Education: Taiyuan University of Technology

Chinese name
- Traditional Chinese: 梁濱
- Simplified Chinese: 梁滨
Transcriptions
Standard Mandarin
- Hanyu Pinyin: Liáng Bīn

Liang Bin (Chinese: 梁滨; born April 1956) is a former Chinese politician from Shanxi province. He spent most of his career working in his home province, successively serving as the Party Secretary of the cities of Shuozhou and Xinzhou, before being transferred to Hebei province in June 2008 to head the party's provincial Organization Department. Liang was investigated by the Chinese Communist Party's anti-graft agency in November 2014.

== Biography ==
Liang was born and raised in Xiaoyi, Shanxi, a county situated near the prefectural city of Lüliang. He began his political career in August 1974, and joined the Chinese Communist Party in June 1979. During the Cultural Revolution, he became a sent-down youth worked in his home province. He entered Taiyuan University of Technology as a Worker-Peasant-Soldier student in December 1976, majoring in electrical machinery, where he graduated in August 1979. He spent 13 years working at his alma mater before serving in various political roles in Shanxi province.

In December 1992 he became the Deputy Secretary of Communist Youth League of Shanxi Provincial Party Committee, rising to Secretary (i.e. leader) in 1994. In July 1996, he served as Executive Deputy Party Secretary of Xinzhou, and acceded to the post of party chief in 1998.

In October 2001, he was appointed the party chief of Shuozhou, he remained in that position until January 2003, when he was transferred to Taiyuan, capital of Shanxi province, and appointed the Vice-Governor of Shanxi province, he was re-elected in October 2006. In May 2008, he was transferred to Hebei province and became a member of the Hebei provincial Party Standing Committee.

In June 2008, he served as the head of Organization Department of the Hebei Provincial Committee of the Communist Party. At the 18th Party Congress in November 2012, Liang earned a seat on the 18th Central Commission for Discipline Inspection (CCDI), the Communist party's top anti-graft body. Liang took part in the widely publicized democratic life meetings of the Hebei provincial Standing Committee attended by Xi Jinping. On November 20, 2014, he was being investigated by the same Commission for "serious violations of laws and regulations".

Liang was the second CCDI member to be investigated by the commission itself following the 18th Party Congress; the first was Shen Weichen, who was also from Shanxi province. Liang's CCDI membership was revoked in January 2015 after a confirmation vote at the Fifth Plenary Session of the 18th CCDI. It is widely believed that Liang's investigation is related to his term in office in Shanxi province.

On January 26, 2015, the CCDI announced that Liang would be expelled from the Chinese Communist Party after an investigation. He was said to have abused his power to seek gain for others, taken massive bribes personally and through his family, and "committed adultery." Liang was sentenced to 8 years in prison on November 25, 2016.

Party political offices
Preceded by Liu Zengbao (刘增宝)	Communist Party Secretary of Xinzhou Region; 1998–2000	Succeeded by Himself as Communist Party Secretary of Xinzhou
New title	Communist Party Secretary of Xinzhou; 2000–2001	Succeeded by Lü Degong (吕德功)
Preceded by Lai Yulong (来玉龙)	Communist Party Secretary of Shuozhou; 2001–2003	Succeeded by Yan Qinsheng (阎沁生)
Preceded by Che Jun	Head of Organization Department of the Hebei Provincial Party Committee; 2008–2014	Succeeded by Liang Tiangeng
