= Miao Jianmin =

Chinese politician

- 缪建民

Chairman of the China Merchants Bank
- Incumbent
- Assumed office September 2020
- Preceded by: Li Jianhong

Chairman of the China Merchants Group
- Incumbent
- Assumed office July 2020
- Preceded by: Li Jianhong

Chairman of the China Life Insurance Company
- In office January 2018 – July 2020
- Preceded by: Wu Yan
- Succeeded by: Luo Xi

Personal details
- Born: 1965 (age 60–61) Haiyan County, Zhejiang, China
- Party: Chinese Communist Party
- Education: Central University of Finance and Economics; Tsinghua University

Chinese name
- Simplified Chinese: 缪建民
- Traditional Chinese: 繆建民
Transcriptions
Standard Mandarin
- Hanyu Pinyin: Miào Jiànmín

Miao Jianmin (Chinese: 缪建民; born 1965) is a Chinese executive and politician, currently serving as chairman of the China Merchants Bank and the China Merchants Group, in office since 2020.

He was an alternate of the 19th Central Committee of the Chinese Communist Party and is an alternate of the 20th Central Committee of the Chinese Communist Party.

== Early life and education ==
Miao was born in Haiyan County, Zhejiang, in 1965. In 1982, he enrolled at Central Institute of Finance and Banking (now Central University of Finance and Economics), where he majored in international insurance. After graduation, he did his postgraduate work at the Graduate Department of the People's Bank of China (now PBC School of Finance, Tsinghua University).

== Career ==
After graduating in 1989, he was assigned to the People's Insurance Company of China.

Starting in July 1995, he served in several posts in China Taiping Insurance Group Limited and China Taiping Insurance Holdings, including deputy general manager, executive director, and president.

He was appointed vice president of the China Life Insurance Company, in December 2005, becoming vice chairman of the board of directors in April 2017 and dean and chairman of the board of directors in January 2018.

He was chosen as chairman of the China Merchants Group in July 2020, concurrently serving as chairman of the China Merchants Bank two months later.

Party political offices
Preceded by Wu Yan	Chairman of the China Life Insurance Company; 2018–2020	Succeeded by Luo Xi
Preceded by Li Jianhong	Chairman of the China Merchants Group; 2020–present	Incumbent
Preceded by Li Jianhong	Chairman of the China Merchants Bank; 2020–present	Incumbent
