= He Dongfeng =

Chinese manufacturing executive and politician

- 贺东风
- Born: April 1966 (age 60); Heilongjiang, China
- Education: Jilin University (B.Eng.); Beijing University of Technology (MSc.)
- Occupations: Manufacturing executive, politician, industrial engineer
- Years active: 1989–present
- Agent: Comac
- Political party: Chinese Communist Party

Chinese name
- Simplified Chinese: 贺东风
- Traditional Chinese: 賀東風
Transcriptions
Standard Mandarin
- Hanyu Pinyin: Hè Dōngfēng

He Dongfeng (Chinese: 贺东风; born April 1966) is a Chinese manufacturing executive and politician who is the current party secretary and chairman of Comac, in office since July 2017.

He was an alternate of the 19th Central Committee of the Chinese Communist Party.

== Biography ==
He was born in Heilongjiang, in April 1966, and graduated from Jilin Polytechnical University (now Jilin University) in 1989. In 2002, he received a master's degree in industrial engineering from Beijing University of Technology.

He joined the Chinese Communist Party (CCP) in May 1988. Beginning in August 1989, he served in several posts in the 211 Plant of the Ministry of Astronautics Industry, including technician, deputy director, director, branch factory director, deputy secretary of the Communist Party Committee and director of the Political Department, secretary of the Discipline Inspection Commission, and factory director (general manager).

He was deputy party secretary and vice president of the 1st Research Institute of China Aerospace Science and Technology Corporation in January 2002, in addition to serving as executive director and vice president of Hong Kong APT Satellite Holdings. He was appointed director of Sichuan Provincial Aerospace Administration in December 2003, concurrently serving as general manager and deputy secretary of Sichuan Aerospace Industry Corporation, president and deputy secretary of the 7th Research Institute of China Aerospace Science and Technology Group (also known as Sichuan Aerospace Technology Research Institute). In December 2007, he was promoted to assistant general manager of China Aerospace Science and Technology Corporation, but having held the position for only three months.

Since April 2008, he assumed various posts in the Comac. He moved up the ranks to become general manager in January 2012 and party secretary and chairman in July 2017.

Business positions
Preceded by Jin Zhuanglong	Chairman of the Comac; 2017–	Incumbent
Party political offices
New title	Communist Party Secretary of the Comac; 2017–	Incumbent
