= Lü Jun =

Chinese executive and politician

- 吕军
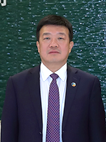
- Born: 1967 (age 58–59); Shulu County, Hebei, China
- Education: China Agricultural University
- Occupations: Executive, politician
- Years active: 1993–present
- Agent: China Datang Corporation
- Political party: Chinese Communist Party

Chinese name
- Simplified Chinese: 吕军
- Traditional Chinese: 呂軍
Transcriptions
Standard Mandarin
- Hanyu Pinyin: Lǚ Jūn

Lü Jun (Chinese: 吕军; born 1967) is a Chinese executive and politician, currently serving as chairman and party branch secretary of the China Datang Corporation.

He was a representative of the 19th National Congress of the Chinese Communist Party and is a representative of the 20th National Congress of the Chinese Communist Party.

He was an alternate of the 19th Central Committee of the Chinese Communist Party and is a member of the 20th Central Committee of the Chinese Communist Party.

== Biography ==
Lü was born in Shulu County (now Xinji), Hebei, in 1967, and graduated from China Agricultural University.

Beginning in 1993, he served in several posts in the COFCO Corporation, including deputy general manager, general manager, and vice president. In May 2016, he moved up the ranks to become chairman and party branch secretary following the retirement of Zhao Shuanglian.

In March 2025, Lü was appointed as the chairman and party branch secretary of the China Datang Corporation.

On 29 October 2026, at the fifth plenary session of the 20th CCP Central Committee, he was elected as a member of the Central Committee.

Business positions
Preceded by Zhao Shuanglian	Chairman of the COFCO Corporation; 2018–2025	Succeeded by Li Guoqiang
