= Huang Minqiang =

Chinese mathematician and computer scientist

Huang Minqiang (Chinese: 黄民强; born October 1960) is a Chinese mathematician and computer scientist, with a specialization in information processing. He is a research professor of the 58th Research Institute of the People's Liberation Army Strategic Support Force. He is an academician of the Chinese Academy of Sciences and an alternate of the 19th Central Committee of the Chinese Communist Party.

== Biography ==
Huang was born in October 1960 in Shanghai. He graduated from the Department of Mathematics of Fudan University in 1980, and earned his Ph.D. from the University of Science and Technology of China in 1989.

Huang is a research professor of the 58th Research Institute of the People's Liberation Army Strategic Support Force. His research focus is on information processing, systems analysis, and discrete mathematics. He served as a member of the Information Assurance Expert Group of the 863 Program.

In 2005, Huang was elected an academician of the Chinese Academy of Sciences. He was elected an alternate of the 19th Central Committee of the Chinese Communist Party in 2017.
