= Guan Qing =

- 官庆
- Born: August 1964; Chengdu, Sichuan, China
- Died: 6 March 2020 (aged 55); Beijing, China
- Education: Hunan University; Southwestern University of Finance and Economics; Southwest Jiaotong University
- Occupations: Executive, politician
- Years active: 1995–2019
- Agent: China State Construction Engineering
- Political party: Chinese Communist Party

Chinese name
- Traditional Chinese: 官慶
- Simplified Chinese: 官庆
Transcriptions
Standard Mandarin
- Hanyu Pinyin: Guān Qìng

Guan Qing (Chinese: 官庆; August 1964 – 6 March 2020) was a Chinese business executive and politician who served as chairman of China State Construction Engineering from 2015 to 2019. He was an alternate member of the 19th Central Committee of the Chinese Communist Party.

== Biography ==
Guan was born in Chengdu, Sichuan, in August 1964. He attended Hunan University where he received his bachelor's degree in civil engineering in 1985. After completing his master's degree in thermal engineering from Southwestern University of Finance and Economics in 1990, he attended Southwest Jiaotong University where he obtained his doctor's degree in management science and engineering in 2008.

Guan joined the China Southwest Architectural Design and Research Institute (中国建筑西南设计研究院) in January 1995, where he was promoted to vice president in 1998 and to president in 2003. He was named a deputy governor of China State Construction Engineering in 2008. He moved up the ranks to become general manager in April 2011 and chairman in May 2015. In October 2017, he became an alternate of the 19th Central Committee of the Chinese Communist Party. In September 2019, he was removed from public office due to illness.

On 6 March 2020, he died from brain tumor in Beijing, at the age of 55.
