= Yu Guang =

- 禹光

Deputy Political Commissar of the People's Liberation Army Rocket Force
- In office July 2018 – December 2021
- Political Commissar: Wang Jiasheng→Xu Zhongbo

Personal details
- Born: October 1958 (age 67) Shaodong County, Hunan, China
- Party: Chinese Communist Party

Military service
- Allegiance: People's Republic of China
- Branch/service: People's Liberation Army Ground Force
- Rank: Lieutenant general

Yu Guang (Chinese: 禹光; pinyin: Yǔ Guāng; born October 1958) is a lieutenant general in the People's Liberation Army of China who served as deputy political commissar of the People's Liberation Army Rocket Force from 2018 to 2021.

He was an alternate of the 19th Central Committee of the Chinese Communist Party.

== Biography ==
Yu was born in the town of Tuanshan, Shaodong County (now Shaodong), Hunan, in October 1958. He served in the People's Liberation Army General Political Department for a long time. In December 2014, he was appointed head of the Publicity Division of the People's Liberation Army General Political Department, succeeding Zhou Tao (major general). He was promoted to assistant director of the Political Work Department of the Central Military Commission in January 2016, and was promoted again to deputy director in July 2017. One year later, he was appointed as deputy political commissar of the People's Liberation Army Rocket Force.

He was promoted to the rank of major general (shaojiang) in December 2011 and lieutenant general (zhongjiang) in July 2018.

Military offices
Preceded by Zhou Tao	Head of the Publicity Division of the People's Liberation Army General Political Department; 2014–2016	Succeeded by Position revoked
Preceded by Huang Guozhu	President of PLA Newspaper; 2013–2014	Succeeded by Li Xiubao
