= Liang Tiangeng =

Chinese politician (born 1960)

- 梁田庚

Vice Chairman of the Hebei Provincial Committee of the Chinese People's Political Consultative Conference
- Incumbent
- Assumed office October 2020
- Chairman: Ye Dongsong

Personal details
- Born: May 1960 (age 66) Dianbai County, Guangdong, China
- Party: Chinese Communist Party
- Education: South China Agricultural University; Fujian Agriculture and Forestry University

Liang Tiangeng (Chinese: 梁田庚; pinyin: Liáng Tiángēng; born May 1960) is a Chinese politician currently serving as vice chairman of the Hebei Provincial Committee of the Chinese People's Political Consultative Conference.

He was an alternate of the 19th Central Committee of the Chinese Communist Party.

== Biography ==
Liang was born in Dianbai County (now Dianbai District), Guangdong, in May 1960. He was a sent-down youth between September 1976 and September 1979. After resuming the college entrance examination, in 1979, he entered South China Agricultural University, majoring in agricultural economic management. Upon graduation in April 1983, he joined the Chinese Communist Party (CCP).

After university in 1983, Liang was assigned to the Ministry of Agriculture, Animal Husbandry and Fisheries (later was reshuffled as the Ministry of Agriculture). He stayed there for 25 long years, interspersed with short stays in the Organization Department of the Central Committee of the Chinese Communist Party from April 1995 to January 1998 and the Guizhou Provincial Economic System Reform Commission from January 1998 and May 1999.

Liang was appointed head of the Organization Department of the CCP Tibetan Autonomous Regional Committee in March 2012 and was admitted to member of the Standing Committee of the CCP Tibetan Autonomous Regional Committee, the region's top authority.

Liang was assigned to the similar position in north China's Hebei province in December 2014. He also served as president of the CCP Hebei Provincial Party School from June 2017 to October 2020. In January 2020, he was chosen as vice chairman of the Hebei Provincial Committee of the Chinese People's Political Consultative Conference, the province's top political advisory body.

Government offices
Preceded by Zhu Xiuyan (朱秀岩)	Director of the Department of Personnel and Labor of the Ministry of Agriculture of the People's Republic of China; 2003–2012	Succeeded by Zeng Yichun
Party political offices
Preceded by Yin Deming	Head of the Organization Department of the Tibetan Autonomous Region Committee of the Chinese Communist Party; 2012–2014	Succeeded by Zeng Wanming
Preceded by Liang Bin	Head of Organization Department of Hebei Provincial Committee of the Chinese Communist Party; 2014–2020	Succeeded by Lian Yimin
