= Ouyang Xiaoping =

Chinese nuclear physicist and politician

- 欧阳晓平
- Born: 24 January 1961 (age 65); Haikou, Guangdong, China
- Education: Hunan University of Science and Engineering; Northwest Institute of Nuclear Technology; Fudan University
- Scientific career
- Fields: Nuclear physics
- Workplaces: Department of Energy and Mining Engineering, Chinese Academy of Engineering

Chinese name
- Simplified Chinese: 欧阳晓平
- Traditional Chinese: 歐陽曉平
Transcriptions
Standard Mandarin
- Hanyu Pinyin: ōuyáng Xiǎopíng

Ouyang Xiaoping (Chinese: 欧阳晓平; born 24 January 1961) is a Chinese nuclear physicist who is a deputy director of the Department of Energy and Mining Engineering, Chinese Academy of Engineering, and an academician of the Chinese Academy of Engineering. He was an alternate of the 19th Central Committee of the Chinese Communist Party.

== Biography ==
Ouyang was born in Haikou, Guangdong (now belonged to Hainan), on 24 January 1961, while his ancestral home in Ningyuan County, Hunan. In 1979, he entered Hunan Lingling Normal College (now Hunan University of Science and Engineering) and later the Northwest Institute of Nuclear Technology, graduating in 1989 with a bachelor's degree in experimental nuclear physics. He joined the Chinese Communist Party (CCP) in October 1991. From 1999 to 2000, he was a visiting scholar at the Oak Ridge National Laboratory in the United States. In 2002, he received his doctor's degree in particle physics and nuclear physics from Fudan University. From 2004 to 2006, he was a postdoctoral fellow at Tsinghua University.

In June 2014, he was recruited as dean of the School of Materials Science and Engineering, Xiangtan University. In October 2017, he became an alternate of the 19th Central Committee of the Chinese Communist Party. In 2022, he took office as deputy director of the Department of Energy and Mining Engineering, Chinese Academy of Engineering.

== Personal life ==
Ouyang is married and has a daughter.

== Honours and awards ==
- 2012 Science and Technology Progress Award of the Ho Leung Ho Lee Foundation
- 2013 Member of the Chinese Academy of Engineering (CAE)
