= Fu Xingguo =

Chinese politician

- 傅兴国

Director of the State Administration of Civil Service
- In office December 2016 – July 2022
- Preceded by: Xin Changxing
- Succeeded by: Zhu Jianping

Personal details
- Born: November 1960 (age 65) Ninghe County, Tianjin, China
- Party: Chinese Communist Party
- Education: Beijing Normal University; Renmin University of China

Chinese name
- Simplified Chinese: 傅兴国
- Traditional Chinese: 傅興國
Transcriptions
Standard Mandarin
- Hanyu Pinyin: Fù Xīngguó

Fu Xingguo (Chinese: 傅兴国; born November 1960) is a Chinese politician who served as director of the State Administration of Civil Service from 2016 to 2022.

He was an alternate of the 19th Central Committee of the Chinese Communist Party.

== Biography ==
Fu was born in Ninghe County (now Ninghe District), Tianjin, in November 1960. He was a sent-down youth between July 1977 and November 1978. After graduating from Ninghe County Normal School in July 1980, he became a teacher at Renfeng Middle School (任凤中学). In 1982, he entered Beijing Normal University, where he majored in education economics.

Fu joined the Chinese Communist Party (CCP) in January 1987. Starting in June 1989, he served in several posts in the Ministry of Personnel, including director of General Affairs Division, director of Training Division, and director of the Civil Service Management Division. He rose to become deputy director of the State Administration of Civil Service in July 2008, and served until December 2011.

In December 2011, Fu was admitted as a member of the Standing Committee of the CCP Ningxia Hui Autonomous Regional Committee, the region's top authority. He was head of the Organization Department of the CCP Ningxia Hui Autonomous Regional Committee in March 2012, in addition to serving as president of the CCP Ningxia Hui Autonomous Regional Party School.

Fu was appointed vice minister of Human Resources and Social Security in December 2016, concurrently serving as director of the State Administration of Civil Service. He was chosen as deputy head of the Organization Department of the CCP Central Committee in July 2018.

Government offices
| Preceded by Liu Jialin (刘嘉林) | Director of the Civil Service Management Division of the Ministry of Personnel; 2006–2008 | Succeeded by Position abolished |
| Preceded by Xin Changxing | Director of the State Administration of Civil Service; 2016–2022 | Succeeded by Zhu Jianping (朱建平) |
Party political offices
| Preceded by Xu Songnan | Head of the Organization Department of the Ningxia Hui Autonomous Region Committee of the Chinese Communist Party; 2012–2016 | Succeeded by Sheng Ronghua |
