= Zhang Zhifen =

- 张志芬

Commander of the Jiuquan Satellite Launch Center
- Incumbent
- Assumed office July 2016
- Preceded by: Shang Hong

Personal details
- Born: 1966 (age 59–60) Shaodong, Hunan, China
- Party: Chinese Communist Party

Military service
- Allegiance: People's Republic of China
- Branch/service: People's Liberation Army Ground Force
- Years of service: ?–present
- Rank: Major general

Chinese name
- Simplified Chinese: 张志芬
- Traditional Chinese: 張志芬
Transcriptions
Standard Mandarin
- Hanyu Pinyin: Zhāng Zhìfén

Zhang Zhifen (Chinese: 张志芬; born 1966) is a major general (shaojiang) of the People's Liberation Army (PLA) currently serving as commander of the Jiuquan Satellite Launch Center. He is an alternate of 19th Central Committee of the Chinese Communist Party.

== Biography ==
Zhang was born in Shaodong, Hunan, in 1966.

He once served as chief of staff of the Xichang Satellite Launch Center. In July 2016, he was appointed commander of the Jiuquan Satellite Launch Center, succeeding Shang Hong.

Military offices
Preceded by Shang Hong (尚宏)	Commander of the Jiuquan Satellite Launch Center; 2016–present	Incumbent
