= Chai Liyuan =

Chinese engineer

- 柴立元
- Born: September 29, 1966 (age 59); Wannian County, Jiangxi, China
- Education: Central South University; Nagoya University
- Scientific career
- Fields: Metallurgical environmental engineering
- Workplaces: Central South University
- Academic advisors: Zhong Haiyun

Chai Liyuan (Chinese: 柴立元; pinyin: Chái Lìyuán; born September 29, 1966) is a Chinese engineer specializing in metallurgical environmental engineering. He is an academician of the Chinese Academy of Engineering (CAE) and currently serving as dean of School of Metallurgy and Environment, Central South University and director of Chinese National Engineering Research Center for Control & Treatment of Heavy Metal Pollution (CNERC-CTHMP).

== Biography ==
Chai was born in Suqiao Township of Wannian County, Jiangxi, on September 29, 1966. He is the youngest of seven children. His father died when he was 10. He and his siblings were raised by their bachelor mother. He secondary studied at Qingyun High School (青云中学). In 1985, he was accepted to Central South University, majoring in non-ferrous metal, where he obtained his doctor's degree in 1997. He did his postgraduate work under the supervision of Zhong Haiyun (钟海云). In 1996 he pursued advanced studies at Nagoya University in Japan. He returned to China in 1999 and established environmental engineering discipline at Central South University. In June 2014 he was promoted to dean of its School of Metallurgy and Environment.

In 2017 he became a delegate to the 19th National Congress of the Chinese Communist Party.

== Honours and awards ==
- 2009 National Science Fund for Distinguished Young Scholars
- 2011 "Chang Jiang Scholar" (or " Yangtze River Scholar")
- 2011 State Technological Invention Award (Second Class)
- 2014 State Science and Technology Progress Award (Second Class)
- November 5, 2015 Industrial Innovation Award of the Ho Leung Ho Lee Foundation
- 2018 State Technological Invention Award (Second Class)
- November 22, 2019 Member of the Chinese Academy of Engineering (CAE)
