= He Yaling =

Chinese physicist (born 1963)

- 何雅玲
- Born: September 1963 (age 62); Xi'an, Shaanxi, China
- Education: Xi'an Jiaotong University
- Scientific career
- Fields: Engineering Thermophysics
- Workplaces: Xi'an Jiaotong University

He Yaling (Chinese: 何雅玲; pinyin: Hé Yǎlíng; born September 1963) is a Chinese physicist and professor at Xi'an Jiaotong University, and an academician of the Chinese Academy of Sciences.

She was a representative of the 20th National Congress of the Chinese Communist Party. She was an alternate of the 19th Central Committee of the Chinese Communist Party and is an alternate of the 20th Central Committee of the Chinese Communist Party.

== Biography ==
He Yaling was born in Xi'an, Shaanxi, in September 1963. After graduating from Xi'an Jiaotong University in 1985, she stayed and taught at the university. She was honored as a Distinguished Young Scholar by the National Science Fund for Distinguished Young Scholars in 2004.

== Publications ==
- 工程热力学常见题型解析及模拟题 [Analysis and Simulation of Common Problems in Engineering Thermodynamics] (in Chinese). Xi'an, Shaanxi: Northwestern Polytechnical University Press. 2004. ISBN 9787561217429.
- 工程热力学精要分析典型题解 [Typical Problems of Essential Analysis of Engineering Thermodynamics] (in Chinese). Xi'an, Shaanxi: Xi'an Jiaotong University Press. 2008. ISBN 9787560513195.
- 工程热力学精要解析 [Essential Analysis of Engineering Thermodynamics] (in Chinese). Xi'an, Shaanxi: Xi'an Jiaotong University Press. 2014. ISBN 9787560567785.
- 储能科学与工程本科专业知识体系与课程设置 [Knowledge System and Curriculum for Undergraduate Students of Energy Storage Science and Engineering] (in Chinese). Beijing: Higher Education Press. 2021. ISBN 9787040561425.

== Honours and awards ==
- 2004 State Natural Science Award (Second Class)
- 2009 State Technological Invention Award (Second Class)
- 2012 State Natural Science Award (Second Class)
- 2015 Science and Technology Progress Award of the Ho Leung Ho Lee Foundation
- October 2015 Member of the Chinese Academy of Sciences (CAS)
