= Wang Hong =

Wang Hong may refer to:

- Wang Hong (politician, born 379) (王弘) (379–432), courtesy name Xiuyuan (休元), formally Duke Wenzhao of Huarong (華容文昭公), a high-level official of the Chinese Liu Song dynasty
- Wang Hong (archer) (born 1965)
- Wang Hong (cyclist) (born 1997)
- Wang Hong (politician, born 1962) (Chinese: 王红), Chinese politician and economist.
- Wang Hong (politician, born 1963), Chinese politician, director of the State Oceanic Administration
- Wang Hong (murder victim), Chinese national and cleaner murdered in Singapore
- Wang Hong (mathematician), Chinese mathematician
