= Qian Zhimin (born 1960) =

Chinese state-owned enterprise executive

Qian Zhimin (Chinese: 钱智民, born 1960) is a Chinese state-owned enterprise executive in the energy industry. He was the chairman and Chinese Communist Party Committee Secretary of China General Nuclear Power Group from 2005 to 2010, president of China National Nuclear Corporation, and is chairman of State Power Investment Corporation. Qian is a former alternate to the 19th Central Committee of the Chinese Communist Party and is a member of the 14th National Committee of the Chinese People's Political Consultative Conference.

== Biography ==
Qian was born in 1960 in Jiangsu. He earned bachelor's and master's degrees in nuclear power engineering.

Qian began his career doing planning and operations work at the Daya Bay Nuclear Power Plant in Guangdong. As a junior employee, his role in receiving guests meant that he interacted with company leaders and high-level national figures, including Li Peng.

In 2002, Qian became general manager of China General Nuclear Power Group. In 2005, he was promoted to chairman and Chinese Communist Party Committee Secretary of CGN.

Qian's strategy was to position CGN as a "clean power company, with nuclear power as its core industry." During his tenure, CGN started its first wind energy project in Jilin (2006). hydropower projects in Sichuan (2006) and Guangxi (2008), and its first solar energy project in Gansu (2009).

Consistent with the go out policy and the Hu Jintao administration's emphasis on energy security, Qian sought for CGN to acquire mining assets both foreign and domestic to improve the security of its supply chain. As CGN's business expanded, Qian re-organized its structure so that assets of similar types would be combined and placed in subsidiaries directly beneath CGN's holding company. Qian also established new nuclear technology development subsidiaries and created a research institute in conjunction with China Huaneng Group and the Chinese Academy of Sciences. Qian then transferred CGN's wind power assets into the research institute and merged CGN's hydropower assets into a single CGN subsidiary.

Qian left CGN in 2010.

In 2018, Qian was made Chairman of State Power Investment Corporation. He had previously been the president of China National Nuclear Corporation.

Qian was an alternate to the 19th Central Committee of the Chinese Communist Party. He is a member of the 14th National Committee of the Chinese People's Political Consultative Conference.

== See also ==
- Nuclear power in China
- Renewable energy in China
- Energy policy of China
