= Ma Zhengwu =

- 马正武
- Born: January 1963 (age 63); China
- Education: Beijing University of Chemical Technology; Hunan University
- Occupations: Executive, politician
- Years active: 1985–present
- Agent: China Rong Tong Asset Management Group Corporation Limited
- Political party: Chinese Communist Party

Chinese name
- Simplified Chinese: 马正武
- Traditional Chinese: 馬正武
Transcriptions
Standard Mandarin
- Hanyu Pinyin: Mǎ Zhèngwǔ

Ma Zhengwu (Chinese: 马正武; born January 1963) is a Chinese business executive and politician who is the current general manager of China Rong Tong Asset Management Group Corporation Limited. He was a member of the 19th Central Committee of the Chinese Communist Party. He was a member of the 12th National Committee of the Chinese People's Political Consultative Conference.

== Biography ==
Born in January 1963, Ma graduated from Beijing University of Chemical Technology in 1985. In 1999, he earned his M.B.A. from the International Business School of Hunan University.

After university, he worked at Beijing Leather Factory, where he was eventually becoming its deputy party secretary. In 1991, he was made deputy director of China National Packaging Corporation, but having held the position for only a year. In 1992, he was appointed director of the General Office of the Ministry of Materials, a post he kept until 1996, when he was transferred to China National Materials Development and Investment Corporation and appointed deputy general manager. He was executive vice president of China Chengtong Holding Co., Ltd. in 2001 and subsequently chairman of China Chengtong Holdings Group in 2004. He concurrently served as chairman and party secretary of China Railway Materials Group from July 2016 to February 2019. In October 2017, he became an alternate of the 19th Central Committee of the Chinese Communist Party. In February 2019, he was chosen as general manager of China Rong Tong Asset Management Group Corporation Limited, a large state-owned enterprise under the State-owned Assets Supervision and Administration Commission of the State Council. In October 2019, he became a member of the 19th Central Committee of the Chinese Communist Party.
