= Guo Dongming =

Chinese engineer and academician

- 郭东明

President of Dalian University of Technology
- Incumbent
- Assumed office 25 February 2014
- Preceded by: Shen Changyu

Personal details
- Born: 30 April 1959 (age 67) Wen County, Henan, China
- Party: Chinese Communist Party
- Education: Dalian University of Technology
- Scientific career
- Fields: Mechanical Manufacturing and Automation
- Workplaces: Dalian University of Technology

Chinese name
- Simplified Chinese: 郭东明
- Traditional Chinese: 郭東明
Transcriptions
Standard Mandarin
- Hanyu Pinyin: Guō Dōngmíng

Guo Dongming (Chinese: 郭东明; born 30 April 1959) is a Chinese engineer, an academician of the Chinese Academy of Engineering, and currently president of Dalian University of Technology.

He was an alternate of the 19th Central Committee of the Chinese Communist Party.

== Biography ==
Guo was born in Wen County, Henan, on 30 April 1959. He earned a bachelor's degree in 1982, a master's degree in 1984, and a doctor's degree in 1992, all from Dalian University of Technology and all in machine manufacturing.

Guo worked at Dalian University of Technology after graduating in 1984. He moved up the ranks to become director of the Department of Mechanical Engineering in July 1996 and dean of the School of Mechanical Engineering in September 1999. In 1995, he was hired as a visiting professor at Chuo University in Japan. In 1998, he became a visiting scholar at the Oregon Graduate Institute of Science and Technology for three months. From May 2000 to May 2001, he was a professor at the University of Melbourne. He was promoted to vice president of Dalian University of Technology in 2002 and executive vice president in 2011. On 25 February 2014, he was promoted again to become president of the university, a position at vice-ministerial level.

== Honours and awards ==
- 2005 State Technological Invention Award (Second Class) for the development and industrial application of highly active hydrorefining catalyst for clean fuel production
- 2008 State Technological Invention Award (First Class) for precision manufacturing technology and equipment for hard and brittle materials with complex curved surfaces
- 2011 Member of the Chinese Academy of Engineering (CAE)
- 2019 State Science and Technology Progress Award (First Class)

Educational offices
Preceded by Shen Changyu	President of Dalian University of Technology; 2014–	Incumbent
