= Song Yushui =

Chinese politician and judge

- 宋鱼水

Vice Chairwoman of the All-China Women's Federation
- Incumbent
- Assumed office October 2013
- Chairwoman: Shen Yueyue

Personal details
- Born: February 1966 (age 60) Penglai County, Shandong, China
- Party: Chinese Communist Party
- Education: Renmin University of China; China University of Political Science and Law

Chinese name
- Simplified Chinese: 宋鱼水
- Traditional Chinese: 宋魚水
Transcriptions
Standard Mandarin
- Hanyu Pinyin: Sòng Yúshuǐ

Song Yushui (Chinese: 宋鱼水; born February 1966) is a Chinese judge and politician who is the current vice chairwoman of the All-China Women's Federation.

She was a representative of the 17th, 18th, and 19th National Congress of the Chinese Communist Party. She was an alternate of the 19th Central Committee of the Chinese Communist Party. Song Yushui is a representative of the 20th National Congress of the Chinese Communist Party and an alternate of the 20th Central Committee of the Chinese Communist Party. She was a delegate to the 11th National People's Congress.

== Early life and education ==
Song was born in Penglai County (now Penglai District), Shandong, in February 1966. In 1985, she entered the Renmin University of China, where she majored in law. She also received a doctor's degree in law from the China University of Political Science and Law in June 2010.

== Political career ==
Song joined the Chinese Communist Party (CCP) in October 1988.

After university in 1989, Song was assigned to the Beijing Haidian District People's Court, where she successively worked as clerk, judge, and deputy chief justice.

Song was appointed vice chairwoman of the All-China Women's Federation in October 2013, in addition to serving as deputy chief justice of the Beijing Intellectual Property Court since November 2014.
