= Song Dan (general) =

Chinese lieutenant general

- 宋丹

Secretary of the Political and Legal Commission of the Central Military Commission
- In office January 2017 – December 2019
- Preceded by: Li Xiaofeng
- Succeeded by: Wang Renhua

Personal details
- Born: July 1956 (age 70) Kunming, Yunnan, China
- Party: Chinese Communist Party
- Education: Southwest University of Political Science & Law

Military service
- Allegiance: People's Republic of China
- Branch/service: People's Liberation Army Ground Force
- Years of service: ?–present
- Rank: Lieutenant general

Song Dan (Chinese: 宋丹; pinyin: Sòng Dān; born July 1956) is a lieutenant general in the People's Liberation Army of China. He was a representative of the 19th National Congress of the Chinese Communist Party. He is a member of the 19th Central Committee of the Chinese Communist Party. He is a delegate to the 13th National People's Congress.

== Biography ==
Song was born in Kunming, Yunnan, in July 1956, while his ancestral home in Sihong County, Jiangsu. After resuming the college entrance examination, in 1978, he was accepted to Southwest University of Political Science & Law and worked in the Security Office of Kunming Military District after graduation. In July 2006, he was promoted to become director of the Legislative Affairs Bureau of the Central Military Commission, a position he held until 2010, when he was appointed deputy director of the General Office of the Central Military Commission. He became deputy director of the Discipline Inspection Commission of the Central Military Commission in November 2015 and secretary of the Political and Legal Commission of the Central Military Commission in January 2017.

He was promoted to the rank of major general (shaojiang) in 2007 and lieutenant general (zhongjiang) in 2017.

Military offices
Preceded by Gao Xiaming (高遐明)	director of the Legislative Affairs Bureau of the Central Military Commission; 2007–2012	Succeeded by Wang Lihong (王黎红)
Preceded by Li Xiaofeng	Secretary of the Political and Legal Commission of the Central Military Commission; 2017–2019	Succeeded by Wang Renhua
