= Luo Hongjiang =

Chinese politician

- 罗红江

Vice Chairman of Yunnan Provincial People's Congress
- Incumbent
- Assumed office January 2021
- Chairman: Ruan Chengfa→Wang Ning

Governor of Xishuangbanna Dai Autonomous Prefecture
- In office March 2013 – January 2021
- Preceded by: Dao Linyin
- Succeeded by: Dao Wen

Personal details
- Born: May 1962 (age 64) Jinghong County, Yunnan, China
- Party: Chinese Communist Party
- Education: Yunnan Minzu University

Chinese name
- Simplified Chinese: 罗红江
- Traditional Chinese: 羅紅江
Transcriptions
Standard Mandarin
- Hanyu Pinyin: Luó Hóngjiāng

Luo Hongjiang (Chinese: 罗红江; born May 1962) is a Chinese politician of Dai ethnicity currently serving as vice chairman of Yunnan Provincial People's Congress. Previously, he served as governor of the Xishuangbanna Dai Autonomous Prefecture.

He was a delegate to the 12th and 13th National People's Congress. He was an alternate of the 19th Central Committee of the Chinese Communist Party.

== Biography ==
Luo was born in Jinghong County (now Jinghong), Yunnan, in May 1962. After resuming the college entrance examination, in 1978, he was accepted to Yunnan Minzu University, majoring in Chinese language and literature. After graduating in 1982, he was assigned to Xishuangbanna Dai Autonomous Prefectural Radio as an editor and journalist, and served until November 1987, when he was promoted to vice president of Xishuangbanna Dai Autonomous Prefectural TV Station.

Luo joined the Chinese Communist Party (CCP) in August 1988. In February 1995, he became deputy director of the Xishuangbanna Dai Autonomous Prefectural Radio and Television Bureau, rising to director in July 1996. He was appointed party secretary of Mengla County in January 2001 and three years later was admitted as a member of the Standing Committee of the CCP Xishuangbanna Dai Autonomous Prefectural Committee, the prefecture's top authority. He was transferred to the capital city, Jinghong, as party secretary in February 2004. He was the executive vice governor of Xishuangbanna Dai Autonomous Prefecture in April 2008 and subsequently deputy party secretary in December 2011. In February 2013, he was named acting governor, confirmed in the following month. In January 2021, he was promoted again to become vice chairman of Yunnan Provincial People's Congress.

Government offices
Preceded by Dao Linyin	Governor of Xishuangbanna Dai Autonomous Prefecture; 2013–2021	Succeeded by Dao Wen
