= Ma Tingli =

Chinese politician

Ma Tingli (born February 1963) is a Chinese politician. He started his career in July 1983 and joined the Chinese Communist Party in July 1985. He graduated from the Department of Physics of Ningxia University with a university degree. He was an alternate of the 19th Central Committee of the Chinese Communist Party.

== Life ==
In December 2000, Tingli served as deputy director of the Foreign Economic and Trade Department of the Ningxia Hui Autonomous Region. In March 2006, he was appointed deputy secretary of the Zhongwei Municipal Committee of the Chinese Communist Party (CCP). In 2008, he was appointed director of the Civil Affairs Department of the Ningxia Autonomous Region. In April 2011, he was appointed Secretary of the Zhongwei Municipal CCP Committee. In July 2013, he served as Vice Chairman of the Autonomous Region Government, Secretary of the Zhongwei Municipal CCP Committee, and Director of the Standing Committee of the Municipal People's Congress. In April 2015, he was promoted to a member of the Standing Committee of the CCP Committee of the Ningxia Hui Autonomous Region of the CCP. The following month, he concurrently served as the Minister of the United Front Work Department of the Autonomous Region Party Committee.

In June 2017, he was transferred to the Standing Committee of the Gansu Provincial Committee of the Chinese Communist Party and Minister of the United Front Work Department. In October 2017, he was elected as an alternate of the 19th Central Committee of the Chinese Communist Party at the 19th National Congress of the CCP. In January 2018, he was elected as a member of the 13th National Committee of the Chinese People's Political Consultative Conference.

In December 2019, he concurrently served as deputy secretary of the Party Leadership Group of the Gansu Provincial Committee of the Chinese People's Political Consultative Conference.

In January 2022, he was elected as deputy director of the Standing Committee of the Gansu Provincial People's Congress.
