= Hang Yihong =

Chinese engineer

- 杭义洪

Communist Party Secretary of China Academy of Engineering Physics
- Incumbent
- Assumed office September 2015

Personal details
- Born: July 1962 (age 63) China
- Party: Chinese Communist Party
- Scientific career

Chinese name
- Simplified Chinese: 杭义洪
- Traditional Chinese: 杭義洪
Transcriptions
Standard Mandarin
- Hanyu Pinyin: Háng Yìhóng

Hang Yihong (Chinese: 杭义洪; born July 1962) is a Chinese engineer who is the party secretary of the China Academy of Engineering Physics since September 2015. He was a representative of the 19th and the 20th National Congress of the Chinese Communist Party. He was an alternate of the 19th Central Committee of the Chinese Communist Party.

== Biography ==
Hang was born in July 1962.

In January 2012, he was promoted to vice president of the China Academy of Engineering Physics. In September 2015, he was promoted again to become party secretary, the top political position in academy.
