= Qiushi =

Chinese Communist Party publication

Qiushi Journal

- Categories: Magazine of political theory
- Frequency: Bi-Weekly
- Publisher: Qiushi Press
- First issue: 1 July 1988; 38 years ago
- Country: China
- Based in: Beijing
- Language: Chinese
- Website: www.qstheory.cn
- ISSN: 1674-7569
- OCLC: 780929465

Qiushi (Chinese: 求是; pinyin: Qiúshì; lit. 'Seeking Truth') is the official theoretical journal and news magazine of the Chinese Communist Party (CCP), published bimonthly by the Central Party School and the Central Committee. The journal is headquartered in Beijing.

Qiushi is published by the Qiushi Press, a deputy-ministerial-level institution.

== History ==
In light of China's changing political climate, the CCP sought to distance itself from the Cultural Revolution, favoring instead a policy of Reform and Opening. Qiushi's more Cultural Revolution-oriented, Maoist predecessor, Red Flag, stopped publishing with its final issues coming out in June 1988. Qiushi was first published in July 1988 as a more reform-oriented voice for the CCP. The title originates from the quote shí shì qiú shì (实事求是), which means "seeking truth from facts." The journal's logo was handwritten by former CCP leader, Deng Xiaoping.

Qiushi established its website on 1 July 2009. On 1 October 2009, an English-language edition of the journal was introduced. In January 2015, Qiushi published an article by Xu Lan, an official from the publicity office of Ningbo, Zhejiang Province, criticizing university professors for "spreading Western values among Chinese youth."

On 15 February 2020, Qiushi documented Xi Jinping's January 7 order regarding the COVID-19 outbreak at a CCP Politburo Standing Committee. Later, on 11 October 2020, Qiushi published an article by Xi Jinping titled "Opening Up New Frontiers for Marxist Political Economy in Contemporary China," in which he quotes French economist Thomas Piketty's work as justification for China's current socialist system in regards to income inequality and wealth inequality.

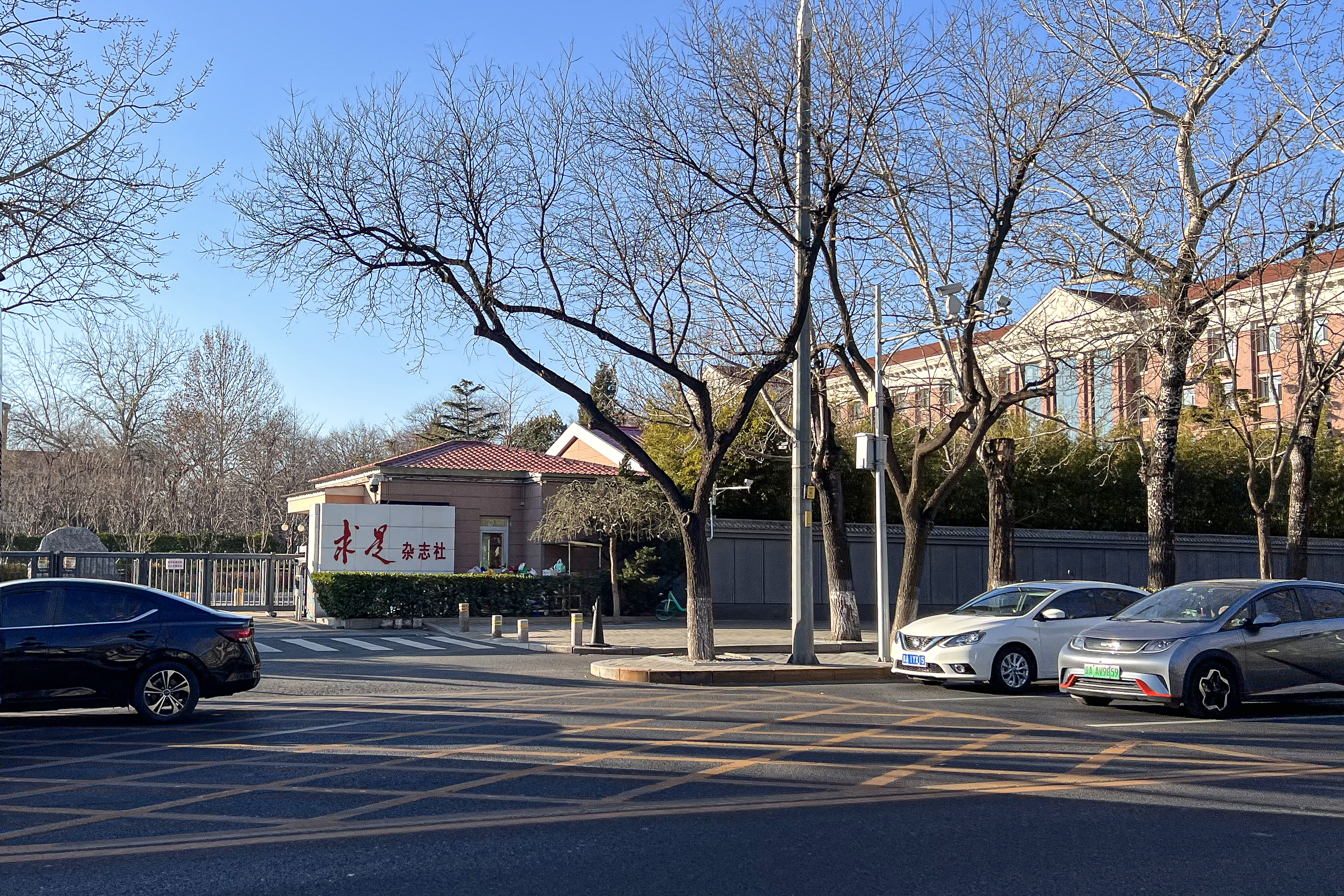
The publisher of Qiushi in Beijing

In 2024, Taiwan's Mainland Affairs Council banned its citizens from working at the Qiushi due to national security concerns.

== Content ==
The magazine publishes articles by the top leaders of China, although most of the writing is done by secretaries and drafting teams. According to its English language edition, "about 60%" of the articles published in the journal are written by party and state leaders such as the CCP general secretary Xi Jinping and senior officials at the ministerial and provincial levels. Contributors also include scholars and researchers of China's think tanks and academic institutions.

The magazine is of particular interest to sinologists since it is a useful collection of speeches and articles by top CCP leaders, as an indication of the general policy direction of the CCP.

== See also ==
- People's Daily
- Kulloja
