= Legislative Affairs Office =

Legislative Affairs Office of the State Council
- 国务院法制办公室

Agency overview
- Formed: 1998
- Preceding agencies: Bureau of Legislative Affairs, 1949; Bureau of Legislative Affairs, 1959
- Dissolved: 2018
- Jurisdiction: China
- Headquarters: Beijing
- Agency executive: Song Dahan, Minister
- Parent agency: State Council
- Website: www.chinalaw.gov.cn

Legislative Affairs Office (法制办公室) was an administrative office within the State Council of the People's Republic of China which assisted the premier in providing legal advice and administrative laws to govern the behaviour of government departments. This included litigation, legal reconsideration, compensation, punishment, license, administrative charges and execution. The office was managed by a director who ranks at the same level as a cabinet minister. The office was abolished and integrated to the Ministry of Justice in 2018.

== History ==
The administrative office was originally established as the Bureau of Legislative Affairs of the state council in 1954. In 1959, the office was dissolved and a new body called the General Office was established to carry out similar functions. The General Office had two departments reporting to it: the Legislative Affairs Bureau and the Economic Legislation Research Center.

In 1986, the General Office was abolished and the two sub-agencies reporting to it were merged to form the Bureau of Legislative Affairs under the State Council. In 1988, the BLA was defined as a functional institution under the oversight of the State Council. In 1998, the Legislative Affairs Office superseded the BLA and became the legal affairs department of the Chinese central government.

The office was abolished and integrated to the Ministry of Justice in 2018 as part of the deepening the reform of the Party and state institutions.

== Administrative structure ==
The office is organised into the following departments.

- Department of General Affairs (Department of Research)
- Department of Politics, Labour and Social Security
- Department of Education, Science, Culture and Public Health
- Department of Fiscal and Financial Affairs
- Department of Industry, Communications and Commerce
- Department of Agriculture, Natural Resources and Environmental Protection
- Department of Coordination on Government Legal Affairs (Department of Codification)
- Department of Translation and Foreign Affairs
- Information Center
- Administration Service Center
- China Legal Publishing House
