= Zhong Denghua =

Zhong Denghua (Chinese: 钟登华; pinyin: Zhōng Dēnghuá; born November 1963) is a Chinese Hydraulic engineer and the current vice minister of Ministry of Education of the People's Republic of China. He is an alternate of the 19th Central Committee of the Chinese Communist Party.

== Biography ==
Zhong graduated from Jiangxi University of Technology (now Nanchang University) in 1985, majored in water conservancy and hydropower engineering. He was elected a member of the Chinese Academy of Engineering in 2009. In 2012, he was appointed as the executive vice president of Tianjin University. In 2016, he was appointed as the president of Tianjin University. In 2019, he was appointed as the vice minister of Ministry of Education of the People's Republic of China.
