= Cao Jianguo =

Chinese engineer

- Born: August 1963 (age 62–63); Zongyang County, Anhui, China
- Education: Beihang University
- Scientific career
- Fields: Aerospace engineering
- Workplaces: Aero Engine Corporation of China

Chinese name
- Traditional Chinese: 曹建國
- Simplified Chinese: 曹建国
Transcriptions
Standard Mandarin
- Hanyu Pinyin: Cáo Jiànguó

Cao Jianguo (Chinese: 曹建国; born August 1963) is a Chinese business executive, and the chairman of Aero Engine Corporation of China (AECC).

== Biography ==
Cao was born in Zongyang County, Anhui, in August 1963. In September 1981 he entered Beihang University, where he graduated in July 1985. After university, he joined the Ministry of Aerospace Industry. He entered the workforce in March 1988, and joined the Chinese Communist Party (CCP) in February 1992. In March 2016, he was promoted to chairman of the newly founded Aero Engine Corporation of China.

He was a delegate to the 19th National Congress of the CCP and an alternate member of the 19th CCP Central Committee.

== Honors and awards ==
- November 22, 2019 Member of the Chinese Academy of Engineering (CAE)

Business positions
New title	Chairman of Aero Engine Corporation of China; 2016	Incumbent
