= Li Qun (politician) =

Chinese politician

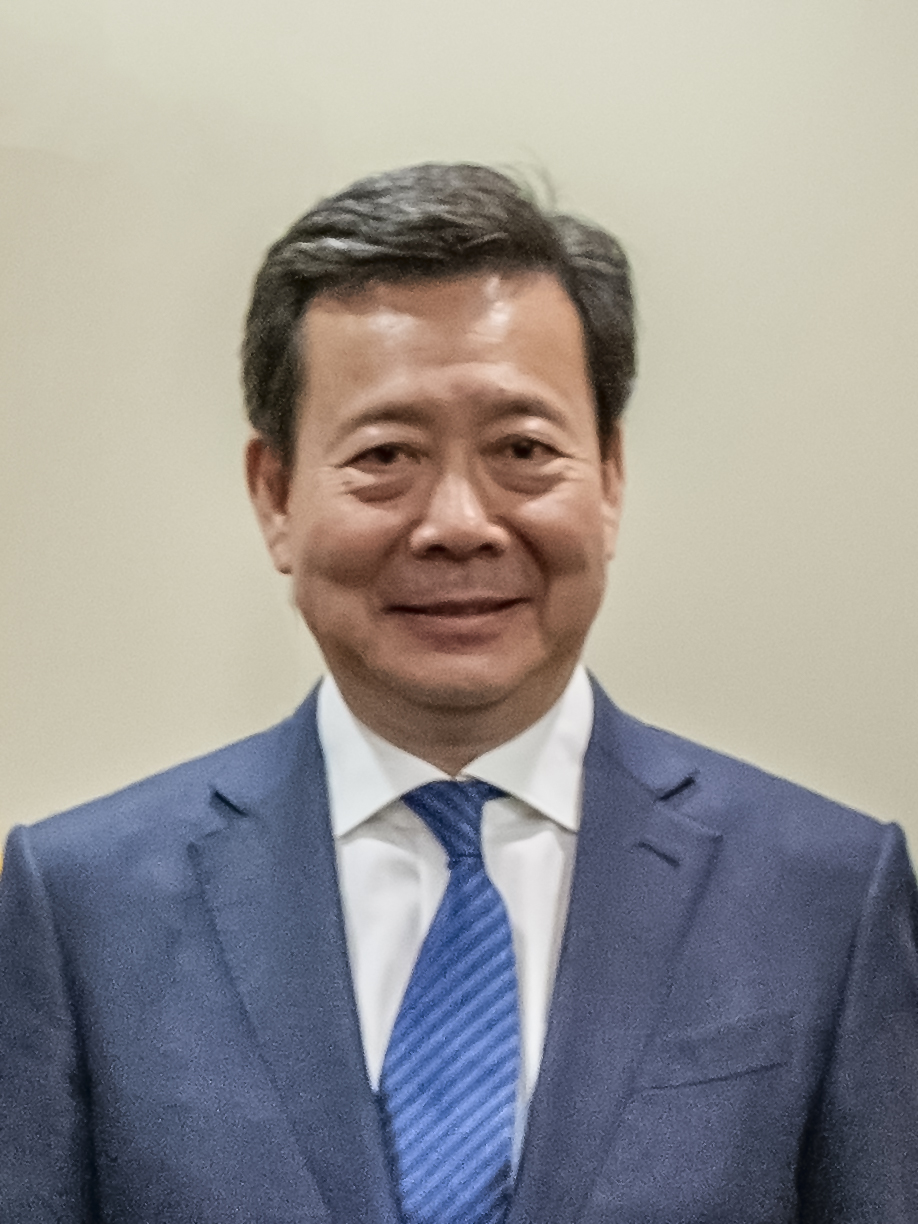
Li Qun in 2024

Li Qun (Chinese: 李群; born February 1962) is a Chinese politician who served as the Communist Party Secretary of Qingdao between 2010 and 2017. He was a member of the standing committee of the Shandong Provincial Committee of the Chinese Communist Party.

Li was born in 1962 in Wendeng County, Shandong. He graduated from the department of physics at Shandong University. After graduating, he worked as an instructor; he joined the Communist Youth League in 1986, taking on leadership roles at the department of management sciences at Shandong University, then the city of Weifang. In 1995 he was named mayor of Shougang. In September 1996 he was named Deputy Secretary of the Communist Youth League of Shandong (executive oversight), then promoted to Secretary in 1997; he served in the post until 2001.

In January 2001, he became mayor of Linyi. In December 2002 he was promoted to CCP committee secretary of Linyi. In March 2007, he was named head of the propaganda department of Shandong Provincial Committee of the CCP, then named to the provincial Party Standing Committee three months later. In November 2010 he became CCP committee secretary of Qingdao.

In March 2017, Li Qun left the post of Qingdao party chief and was named Executive-Vice Governor of Shandong province. On March 21, 2018, he was transferred to become a deputy minister of Culture and Tourism.
