= Standing Committee of the 19th Central Commission for Discipline Inspection =

Chinese government committee established in 2017

The 19th Standing Committee of the Central Commission for Discipline Inspection (CCDI) was elected at the 1st Plenary Session of the 18th CCDI on 25 October 2017.

== Membership ==
- Secretary: Zhao Leji
- Deputy Secretaries (by order of rank): Yang Xiaodu, Zhang Shengmin, Liu Jinguo, Yang Xiaochao, Li Shulei, Xu Lingyi, Xiao Pei and Chen Xiaojiang
- Standing Committee members (listed in the order of the number of strokes in their surnames): Wang Hongjin, Bai Shaokang, Liu Jinguo, Li Shulei, Yang Xiaochao, Yang Xiaodu, Xiao Pei, Zou Jiayi (f.), Zhang Shengmin, Zhang Chunsheng, Chen Xiaojiang, Chen Chaoying, Zhao Leji, Hou Kai, Jiang Xinzhi, Luo Yuan, Xu Lingyi, Ling Ji, Cui Peng.
