= Guo Mingyi =

Chinese philanthropist

Guo Mingyi (simplified Chinese: 郭明义; traditional Chinese: 郭明義; pinyin: Guō Míngyì; born December 1958), is a Chinese philanthropist from Anshan, Liaoning. He became famous due to the large number of generous deeds which were popularised by the Chinese Communist Party as a role model along the line of the 'learn from Lei Feng' propaganda campaign.

== Biography ==
Guo Mingyi's career started with him joining the army in 1977. He became a member of the Chinese Communist Party (CCP) in 1980 and was demobilised from the army in 1982. He started work for Angang/Anshan Iron and Steel Group working at Qidashan mine, just north of Anshan. He was noted for his diligence and commitment to work, as well as his philanthropic works. These included attending his work two hours early every day for 15 years, many blood donations, campaigns to find bone marrow donors for children with leukemia and donating significant amounts of money to fund poor children's education, despite his own low earnings. He continues to live with his family in a single room, 40 square metre apartment that he first moved into in the 1980s. He has been offered improved accommodation but passed it up so that other colleagues could get better housing. For these acts, from 2010 onwards he has received many national level awards.

In 2011, a movie biography of Guo Mingyi was produced. The movie was directed by Chen Guoxing and Wang Jing, with the lead part played by Hou Yong and supporting parts by Jiang Hongbo, Li Qin and Feng Yuanzheng.

Guo was an alternate of the 18th Central Committee of the Chinese Communist Party; he is ranked close to the end of the list of alternate, which is ranked by number of confirmation votes received at the 18th National Congress of the Chinese Communist Party. His elevation to the CCP Central Committee was notable in that he had no political or business experience prior to his joining the elite committee. In 2013, he was named a vice chairman of the All-China Federation of Trade Unions.

=== The "Father-like Smile" Gaffe ===
On Oct 23, 2013, Guo Mingyi posted on Sina Weibo describing an encounter with Xi Jinping, the general secretary of the Chinese Communist Party and president of China. In the post he used the phrase "smile like an affectionate father" (慈父般的笑容) for Xi. The post raised a lot of attention and mockery because Xi is only 5 years his senior. Guo removed the phrase afterwards.
