= Luo Xi (banker) =

- Born: 6 December 1960 (age 65); People's Republic of China
- Education: Tsinghua University
- Occupations: Banker, economist

Luo Xi
- Traditional Chinese: 羅熹
- Simplified Chinese: 罗熹
Transcriptions
Standard Mandarin
- Hanyu Pinyin: Luó Xī
- Wade–Giles: Lo Hsi

Luo Xi (born 6 December 1960) is a Chinese banker and economist who is the current vice president of the Industrial and Commercial Bank of China (ICBC), one of the world's largest banks by assets and market value.

== Career ==
After graduating from the Graduate School of the People's Bank of China in 1987, Luo Xi joined the Agricultural Bank of China (ABC) and worked there until 2009, when he was transferred from the position of vice president of ABC to vice president of the Industrial and Commercial Bank of China (ICBC). In 2013, Luo Xi began to work in the insurance industry, serving as general manager of China Export Credit Insurance Corporation. In 2016, he was appointed vice chairman and general manager of China Resources (Group) Co., Ltd. In November 2018, he was appointed Chairman of Taiping Group.

While serving as the top leader of Taiping Group, Luo Xi also served as the chairman of Taiping Insurance Group (Hong Kong) Company and Taiping Insurance Holdings, and concurrently served as the chairman of several Taiping subsidiaries such as Taiping Life Insurance and Taiping Assets.

In July 2020, he took up the new position of Chairman of China Merchants Group. In September of the same year, Luo Xi took over as Party Secretary of China Life Insurance and then became chairman.

== Controversies ==
According to a report by Top News on 7 February 2023, the PICC Life Insurance Company issued a notice requiring all cadres and employees at all levels of the provincial, municipal, and county branches to recite a collection of Chairman Luo Xi's quotes about business and management. The notice also stated that all employees must complete closed-book exams by February 10 and summarize the exam results. The incident sparked widespread criticism on social media and trended on Weibo's hot search list on February 6. The company has suspended the exams, apologized for the incident, and promised not to do it again.

== Published books ==
- Manual of Modern Bank Accountant
- Research of Currency In Rural Area
- Practice of Accounting Of Agricultural Bank of China.

== External Reading ==
- https://web.archive.org/web/20130502162013/http://renwu.hexun.com/figure_1195.shtml
- https://web.archive.org/web/20130406001115/http://www.fpsbchina.cn/webPage/Information.jsp?menuid=10028
