= Alternates of the 20th Central Committee of the Chinese Communist Party =

The 20th Central Committee of the Chinese Communist Party was elected by the 20th National Congress in 2022, with 171 individuals serving as alternates during this term.

== Alternates ==
Alternates of the 20th Central Committee of the Chinese Communist Party
Ballot	Name		19th CC	Birth	PM	Birthplace	Ethnicity	Gender	Ref.
1	Ding Xiangqun	丁向群	Nonmember	1965	1999	Jiangsu	Han	Female	
2	Ding Xingnong	丁兴农	Nonmember	1963	—	Jiangsu	Han	Male	
3	Yu Lijun	于立军	Nonmember	1967	—	Liaoning	Han	Male	
4	Yu Jihong	于吉红	Nonmember	1967	—	Liaoning	Han	Female	
5	Yu Huiwen	于会文	Nonmember	1968	1993	Liaoning	Manchu	Male	
6	Ma Hancheng	马汉成	Nonmember	1968	1987	Ningxia	Hui	Male	
7	Wang Jian	王健	Nonmember	1965	1985	—	Han	Male	
8	Wang Xi	王曦	Alternate	1966	2001	Jiangsu	Han	Male	
9	Wang Liyan	王立岩	Nonmember	1962	1992	—	Han	Male	
10	Wang Yonghong	王永红	Nonmember	1969	1991	—	Han	Male	
11	Wang Kangping	王抗平	Nonmember	1965	—	Hunan	Han	Male	
12	Wang Tingkai	王庭凯	Nonmember	1967	1994	Jilin	Han	Male	
13	Wang Xinwei	王新伟	Nonmember	1967	1985	Henan	Han	Male	
14	Wang Jiayi	王嘉毅	Nonmember	1965	1985	Ningxia	Han	Male	
15	Wei Tao	韦韬	Nonmember	1970	1998	Guangxi	Zhuang	Male	
16	Fang Yongxiang	方永祥	Nonmember	1966	1986	Fujian	Han	Male	
17	Fang Hongwei	方红卫	Nonmember	1966	1987	Shaanxi	Han	Male	
18	Deng Yiwu	邓亦武	Nonmember	1965	1986	Hunan	Han	Male	
19	Deng Xiuming	邓修明	Nonmember	1964	1992	Shandong	Han	Male	
20	Shi Yugang	石玉钢	Nonmember	1965	1996	Hunan	Miao	Male	
21	Shi Zhenglu	石正露	Alternate	1963	—	Hubei	Han	Male	
22	Lu Hong	卢红	Nonmember	1968	1993	Sichuan	Han	Female	
23	Lu Dongliang	卢东亮	Nonmember	1973	1993	Liaoning	Han	Male	
24	Fu Wenhua	付文化	Nonmember	1965	1985	—	Han	Male	
25	Cong Liang	丛亮	Nonmember	1971	—	Shandong	Han	Male	
26	Bao Gang	包钢	Nonmember	1969	1988	Liaoning	Mongolian	Male	
27	Xing Shanping	邢善萍	Nonmember	1968	1993	Anhui	Han	Female	
28	Ji Lin	吉林	Nonmember	1962	1984	Shanghai	Han	Male	
29	Qu Yingpu	曲莹璞	Nonmember	1965	—	Henan	Han	Male	
30	Lü Jun	吕军	Nonmember	1967	—	Hebei	Han	Male	
31	Zhu Tianshu	朱天舒	Nonmember	1968	1994	Jiangsu	Han	Male	
32	Zhu Wenxiang	朱文祥	Nonmember	1963	—	Jiangxi	Han	Male	
33	Zhu Zhisong	朱芝松	Nonmember	1969	—	Jiangsu	Han	Male	
34	Zhu Guoxian	朱国贤	Nonmember	1964	1986	Zhejiang	Han	Male	
35	Zhu Hexin	朱鹤新	Nonmember	1968	1999	Jiangsu	Han	Male	
36	Liu Jun	刘珺	Nonmember	1972	—	Gansu	Han	Male	
37	Liu Jie	刘捷	Nonmember	1970	1996	Jiangsu	Han	Male	
38	Liu Qiang	刘强	Nonmember	1971	1996	Ningxia	Han	Male	
39	Liu Zhonghua	刘仲华	Nonmember	1965	—	Hunan	Han	Male	
40	Liu Hongjian	刘洪建	Nonmember	1973	1996	Fujian	Han	Male	
41	Liu Guiping	刘桂平	Nonmember	1966	1996	Hunan	Han	Male	
42	Liu Liehong	刘烈宏	Nonmember	1968	1997	Sichuan	Han	Male	
43	Liu Jingzhen	刘敬桢	Nonmember	1967	—	Heilongjiang	Han	Male	
44	Guan Zhi'ou	关志鸥	Nonmember	1969	1993	Liaoning	Manchu	Male	
45	Tang Guangfu	汤广福	Nonmember	1966	—	Anhui	Han	Male	
46	An Wei	安伟	Nonmember	1966	1988	Henan	Han	Male	
47	Nong Shengwen	农生文	Nonmember	1965	1995	Guangxi	Zhuang	Male	
48	Sun Xiangdong	孙向东	Nonmember	1968	—	Hubei	Han	Male	
49	Sun Jinming	孙金明	Nonmember	1965	—	Jiangsu	Han	Male	
50	Sun Meijun	孙梅君	Nonmember	1965	1986	Sichuan	Han	Female	
51	Ji Bin	纪斌	Nonmember	1966	—	Taiwan	Han	Male	
52	Du Jiangfeng	杜江峰	Nonmember	1969	—	Jiangsu	Han	Male	
53	Li Yunze	李云泽	Nonmember	1970	2001	Shandong	Han	Male	
54	Li Wentang	李文堂	Nonmember	1965	—	Zhejiang	Han	Male	
55	Li Shucai	李术才	Nonmember	1965	—	Hebei	Han	Male	
56	Li Shisong	李石松	Nonmember	1969	1995	Yunnan	Bai	Male	
57	Li Hongjun	李红军	Nonmember	1965	1986	Hubei	Han	Male	
58	Li Xianyu	李贤玉	Nonmember	1965	—	Heilongjiang	Korean	Female	
59	Li Mingjun	李明俊	Nonmember	1970	1989	Henan	Han	Male	
60	Li Mingqing	李明清	Nonmember	1965	1992	Chongqing	Han	Male	
61	Li Jianrong	李建榕	Nonmember	1966	—	—	Han	Female	
62	Li Rongcan	李荣灿	Nonmember	1966	1987	Zhejiang	Han	Male	
63	Li Dianxun	李殿勋	Nonmember	1967	1994	Henan	Han	Male	
64	Li Ruxin	李儒新	Nonmember	1969	—	Fujian	Han	Male	
65	Yang Bin	杨斌	Nonmember	1966	—	Yunnan	Yi	Male	
66	Yang Jinbai	杨晋柏	Nonmember	1973	2003	Hubei	Han	Male	
67	Lian Maojun	连茂君	Nonmember	1970	—	Liaoning	Han	Male	
68	Shi Guanghui	时光辉	Nonmember	1970	1993	Anhui	Han	Male	
69	Wu Hao	吴浩	Nonmember	1972	1993	Henan	Han	Male	
70	Wu Qing	吴清	Nonmember	1965	—	Anhui	Han	Male	
71	Wu Qiang	吴强	Alternate	1966	1994	Hunnan	Dong	Male	
72	Wu Kongming	吴孔明	Nonmember	1964	—	Henan	Han	Male	
73	Wu Junbao	吴俊宝	Nonmember	1965	—	Hubei	Han	Male	
74	Wu Shenghua	吴胜华	Alternate	1966	1994	Guizhou	Bouyei	Male	
75	Wu Zhaohui	吴朝晖	Alternate	1966	1995	Zhejiang	Han	Male	
76	Qiu Yong	邱勇	Nonmember	1964	1985	Sichuan	Han	Male	
77	He Yaling	何雅玲	Alternate	1963	—	Shaanxi	Han	Female	
78	Gu Shu	谷澍	Nonmember	1967	—	—	Han	Male	
79	Shen Ying	沈莹	Nonmember	1965	1987	Henan	Han	Female	
80	Shen Danyang	沈丹阳	Nonmember	1965	1985	Fujian	Han	Male	
81	Zhang Wei	张伟	Nonmember	1968	1974	Shaanxi	Han	Male	
82	Zhang Zheng	张政	Nonmember	1966	1987	Heilongjiang	Han	Male	
83	Zhang Fengzhong	张凤中	Nonmember	1966	1989	Jiangsu	Han	Male	
84	Zhang Wenbing	张文兵	Nonmember	1971	1994	Anhui	Han	Male	
85	Zhang Anshun	张安顺	Nonmember	1965	1986	Shandong	Han	Male	
86	Zhang Guohua	张国华	Nonmember	1964	1985	Jiangsu	Han	Male	
87	Zhang Zhongyang	张忠阳	Nonmember	1970	1999	Hunan	Han	Male	
88	Zhang Jinliang	张金良	Nonmember	1969	—	Shandong	Han	Male	
89	Zhang Chunlin	张春林	Nonmember	1965	1986	Sichuan	Han	Male	
90	Zhang Rongqiao	张荣桥	Nonmember	1966	—	Anhui	Han	Male	
91	Zhang Chaochao	张超超	Nonmember	1967	1987	Henan	Han	Male	
92	Zhang Zhigang	张智刚	Nonmember	1964	—	Shaanxi	Han	Male	
93	Chen Jie	陈杰	Nonmember	1965	—	Fujian	Han	Male	
94	Chen Yong	陈雍	Nonmember	1966	1988	Liaoning	Manchu	Male	
95	Chen Yongqi	陈永奇	Nonmember	1967	1985	Shanxi	Han	Male	
96	Chen Hongmin	陈宏敏	Nonmember	—	—	—	Han	Male	
97	Chen Jianwen	陈建文	Nonmember	1965	1994	Fujian	Han	Male	
98	Chen Ruifeng	陈瑞峰	Nonmember	1966	1989	Shandong	Han	Male	
99	Lin Keqing	林克庆	Nonmember	1966	1990	Hubei	Han	Male	
100	Hang Yihong	杭义洪	Alternate	1962	—	Shandong	Han	Male	
101	Luo Qiang	罗强	Nonmember	1970	1998	Guizhou	Miao	Male	
102	Luo Dongchuan	罗东川	Nonmember	1965	1986	Chongqing	Han	Male	
103	Jin Donghan	金东寒	Alternate	1961	—	Heilongjiang	Han	Male	
104	Zhou Zhixin	周志鑫	Alternate	1965	—	Anhui	Han	Male	
105	Zhou Jianguo	周建国	Nonmember	1964	1984	Shaanxi	Han	Male	
106	Zheng Xuexuan	郑学选	Nonmember	1966	1987	—	Han	Male	
107	Zhao Dong	赵东	Nonmember	1971	—	—	Manchu	Male	
108	Hu Wenrong	胡文容	Alternate	1964	1990	Fujian	Han	Male	
109	Shi Xiaolin	施小琳	Alternate	1969	1993	Zhejiang	Han	Female	
110	Jiang Hui	姜辉	Nonmember	1969	1994	Liaoning	Han	Male	
111	Jiang Guoping	姜国平	Nonmember	1962	—	Shandong	Han	Male	
112	Hong Qing	洪庆	Nonmember	1976	2000	Jilin	Korean	Male	
113	Zulhayat Ismail	祖力亚提·司马义	Nonmember	1977	—	Xinjiang	Uyghur	Female	
114	Fei Dongbin	费东斌	Nonmember	1970	1996	Liaoning	Han	Male	
115	Fei Gaoyun	费高云	Nonmember	1971	1992	Jiangsu	Han	Male	
116	Yao Lin	姚林	Nonmember	1965	—	Jiangsu	Han	Male	
117	Yuan Jie	袁洁	Nonmember	1965	—	Jiangsu	Han	Male	
118	Yuan Gujie	袁古洁	Nonmember	1968	1992	Guizhou	Han	Female	
119	Xia Linmao	夏林茂	Nonmember	1970	1997	Jiangsu	Han	Male	
120	Xu Liuping	徐留平	Nonmember	1964	1987	Jiangsu	Han	Male	
121	Ling Huanxin	凌焕新	Nonmember	1962	—	Jiangsu	Han	Male	
122	Guo Fang	郭芳	Nonmember	1970	1996	Fujian	Han	Female	
123	Guo Yuanqiang	郭元强	Nonmember	1965	1986	Henan	Han	Male	
124	Guo Ningning	郭宁宁	Nonmember	1970	—	Liaoning	Han	Female	
125	Guo Yonghong	郭永红	Nonmember	1968	1990	Hubei	Han	Female	
126	Guo Zhuxue	郭竹学	Nonmember	1966	1985	Hebei	Han	Male	
127	Zhuge Yujie	诸葛宇杰	Nonmember	1971	1992	Shanghai	Han	Male	
128	Huang Ru	黄如	Nonmember	1969	—	Fujian	Hui	Female	
129	Huang Xucong	黄旭聪	Nonmember	1968	—	Zhejiang	Han	Male	
130	Huang Zhiqiang	黄志强	Nonmember	1970	1992	Jiangsu	Han	Male	
131	Huang Lusheng	黄路生	Nonmember	1965	—	Jiangxi	Han	Male	
132	Cao Shumin	曹淑敏	Alternate	1966	1990	Hebei	Han	Female	
133	Gong Qihuang	龚旗煌	Nonmember	1964	—	Fujian	Han	Male	
134	Chang Jin	常进	Nonmember	1966	1995	Jiangsu	Han	Male	
135	Cui Yuzhong	崔玉忠	Alternate	1964	—	Heilongjiang	Han	Male	
136	Cui Yonghui	崔永辉	Nonmember	1970	1991	Hubei	Han	Male	
137	Kang Yi	康义	Nonmember	1966	1986	Hunan	Han	Male	
138	Peng Jiaxue	彭佳学	Nonmember	1965	1987	Anhui	Han	Male	
139	Ge Qiaohong	葛巧红	Nonmember	1970	—	Henan	Han	Female	
140	Dong Weimin	董卫民	Nonmember	1968	1990	Hebei	Han	Male	
141	Han Liming	韩立明	Nonmember	1964	1986	Jiangsu	Han	Female	
142	Qin Weizhong	覃伟中	Nonmember	1971	2001	Guangxi	Han	Male	
143	Jing Jianfeng	景建峰	Nonmember	1966	—	Zhejiang	Han	Male	
144	Fu Aiguo	傅爱国	Nonmember	1964	—	—	Han	Male	
145	Purpu Tonchup	普布顿珠	Nonmember	1972	1996	Tibet	Tibetan	Male	
146	Zeng Yixin	曾益新	Nonmember	1962	1984	Hunan	Han	Male	
147	Zeng Zanrong	曾赞荣	Nonmember	1969	1987	Hunan	Han	Male	
148	Wen Gang	温刚	Nonmember	1966	1987	Shanxi	Han	Male	
149	Lan Xiao	蓝晓	Nonmember	1969	1993	Guangxi	Yao	Male	
150	Yu Aihua	虞爱华	Nonmember	1965	1988	Anhui	Han	Male	
151	Dou Xiankang	窦贤康	Nonmember	1966	1985	Anhui	Han	Male	
152	Cai Yunge	蔡允革	Nonmember	1971	1993	Hebei	Han	Male	
153	Cai Lixin	蔡丽新	Nonmember	1971	1992	Jiangsu	Han	Female	
154	Cai Xiliang	蔡希良	Nonmember	1966	—	—	Han	Male	
155	Gama Zeden	嘎玛泽登	Nonmember	1967	1992	Tibet	Tibetan	Male	
156	Liao Lin	廖林	Nonmember	1966	—	Guangxi	Han	Male	
157	Miao Jianmin	缪建民	Nonmember	1965	—	Zhejiang	Han	Male	
158	Li Xiang	黎湘	Nonmember	1967	—	Hunan	Han	Male	
159	Wei Wenhui	魏文徽	Nonmember	1966	—	Shandong	Han	Male	
160	Tsheringthar	才让太	Nonmember	1969	1994	Qinghai	Tibetan	Male	
161	Wang Xudong	王旭东	Alternate	1967	2003	Gansu	Han	Male	
162	Wang Xiaoyun	王晓云	Alternate	1968	—	Zhejiang	Han	Female	
163	Yang Fasen	杨发森	Nonmember	1971	1993	Gansu	Han	Male	
164	Xiao Chuan	肖川	Nonmember	—	—	—	Han	Male	
165	Yu Jianfeng	余剑锋	Nonmember	1965	1997	Gansu	Han	Male	
166	Song Zhiyong	宋志勇	Nonmember	1965	—	—	Han	Male	
167	Song Yushui	宋鱼水	Alternate	1966	1988	Shandong	Han	Female	
168	Zhang Jing	张晶	Nonmember	1982	—	Heilongjiang	Han	Male	
169	Zhou Changkui	周长奎	Nonmember	1969	—	Shandong	Han	Male	
170	Shi Jintong	施金通	Nonmember	1979	2001	Hunan	Miao	Male	
171	Wang Cheng	王成	Nonmember	1969	1991	Shanxi	Han	Male	
