= Shuanglong =

Shuanglong may refer to:

- Shuanglong Cave, in Zhejiang, China
- Shuanglong Station, the name of several stations in China

== Towns and Townships ==
- Shuanglong, Hunan, a town in Huayuan County, Hunan
- Shuanglong, Chongqing, a town in Changshou District of Chongqing
