= Early buildings of Wuhan University =

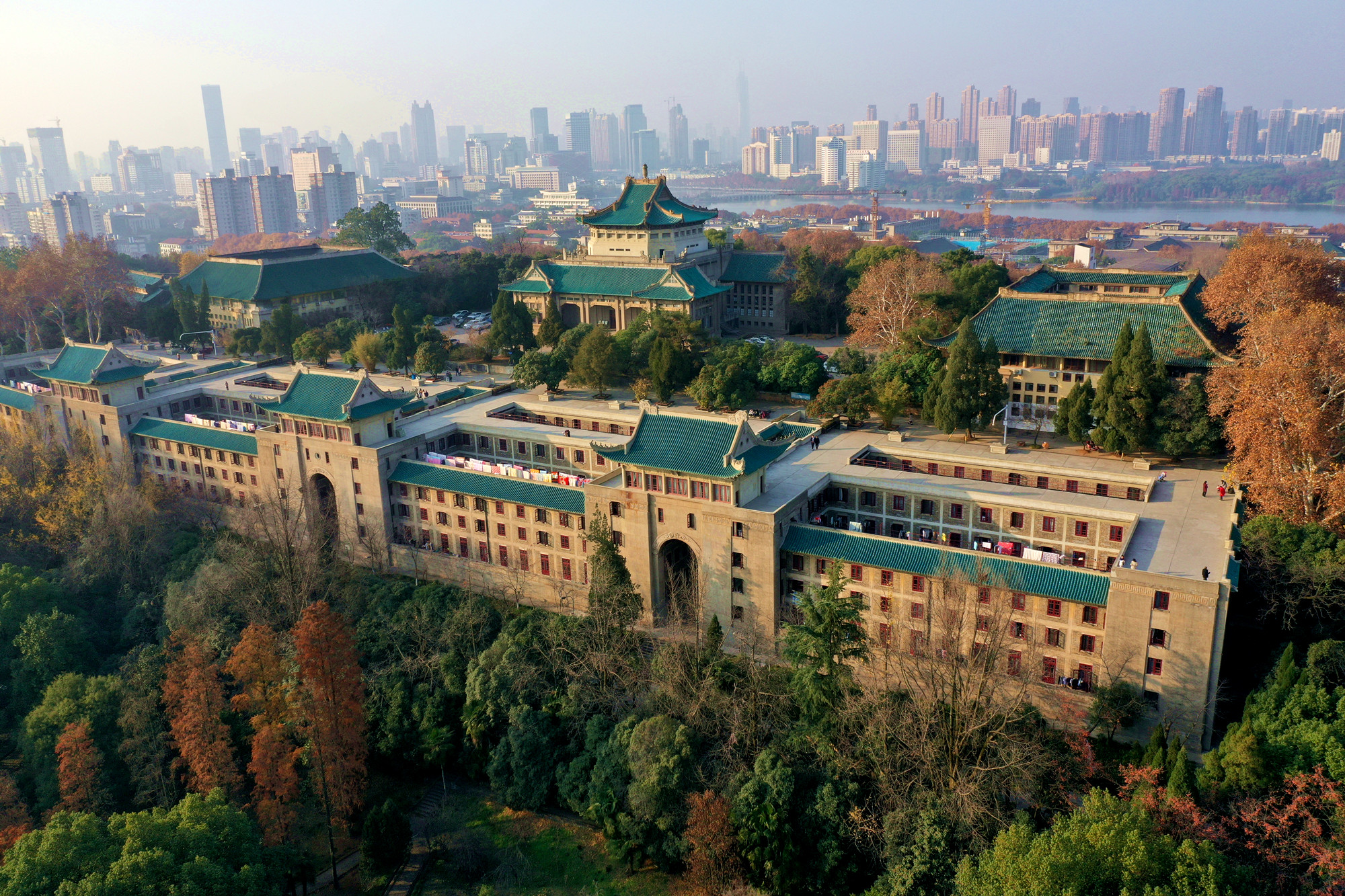
- Interactive map of the Early buildings of Wuhan University area

General information
- Classification: Important historical sites and representative buildings in modern times
- Location: Wuhan City, Hubei Province, China
- Year built: Modern times

The early buildings of Wuhan University are one of the representatives of modern university architecture in China. The early buildings of Wuhan University have high architectural art, humanistic historical and scientific values, and the international symposium considers that these buildings are expected to become a new world cultural heritage.

Due to their high historical, artistic, and scientific value, they were listed by the State Council of China on June 25, 2001, as the fifth batch of national key cultural relics protection units and the first batch of historical building complexes in Chinese university campuses, together with the early buildings of Tsinghua University and the Weiming Lake Yanyuan buildings of Peking University.

== Building list ==
The early buildings of Wuhan University were mainly school buildings planned and designed at one time and built continuously on the Luojiashan campus between 1930 and 1936. There were 30 projects and 68 buildings in total, with a construction area of 78,596 square meters and a cost of 4 million silver yuan. In addition, some buildings from the 1940s and 1950s were also included. Such a huge construction activity is rare in the history of modern Chinese architecture. Now most of the buildings are well preserved and still in use. Among them, 15 sites and 26 buildings are listed as national key cultural relics protection units, with a construction area of 54,054.52 square meters. The basic information of these buildings is shown in the table below (area unit/square meter):

Building Name	Current name	Number of buildings	Number of layers	Building Area	Completion time	Building Types	Building Structure	Designer	Construction Party
Male dormitory	Yingyuan Dormitory (common name), Laozhai Dormitory, Yingyuan Dormitory 1 to 4	4	4	13773	1931	Life	Brick-concrete structure	F. H. Kales R. Sachse	Hanxie Sheng Construction Factory
Student dining hall and club	Yingyuan Canteen and Yingyuan Student Activity Center	1	2	2727	1931	Life			Hanxie Sheng Construction Factory
Faculty of Arts and Law	School of Mathematics (general name), Old School of Arts, School of Mathematics and Statistics	1	4	3928	1931	Science and Education			Hanxie Sheng Construction Factory
Faculty of Science	Science Building, Old Science Building	5	5	4671 5449	1931 1936	Science and Education	Reinforced concrete Frame structure	F. H. Kales R. Sachse	Hanxie Sheng Construction Factory Yuan Ruitai Construction Factory
Zhou Enlai's Former Residence		1	3	392	1931		Brick and wood structure	R. Sachse	Hanxie Sheng Construction Factory
Former Residence of Guo Moruo		1	3	476	1931		Brick and wood structure	R. Sachse	Hanxie Sheng Construction Factory
National Wuhan University Archway	Old archway (common name)	1	-	40.5	1933		Reinforced concrete structure		Hanxie Sheng Construction Factory
Hillside Residence	Hillside Residence, Board of Directors, Alumni Association	1	2	507	1933				Hanxie Sheng Construction Factory
library	Old Library (common name), School History Exhibition Hall	1	6	4767	1935	library	Reinforced concrete Frame structure	F. H. Kales	Shanghai Liuhe Company
Faculty of Law	Foreigner Building (common name), Foreigner Wen Building, Quality Development Strategy Research Institute	1	4	4013	1936	Science and Education			Shanghai Liuhe Company
College of Science	Administration Building (common name)	5	4	8140	1936	Science and Education	Reinforced concrete Frame structure	F. H. Kales	Shanghai Liuhe Company
stadium	Songqing Gymnasium (common name), Old Gymnasium	1	4	2748	1936	sports	Reinforced concrete frame Three-hinged arch steel frame structure	F. H. Kales A. Levenspiel	Shanghai Liuhe Company
Central China Hydraulic Engineering Laboratory	Archives	1	2	2197	1936				Shanghai Liuhe Company
June 1 Memorial Pavilion		1	1	58.02	1948				
Former Residence of Li Da		1	1	168	1952				

== Construction process ==
On August 6, 1928, the National Government College appointed Li Siguang, Wang Xinggong, Zhang Nanxian,Shi Ying, Ye Yaguo, and Mai Huanzhang as members of the National Wuhan University New Campus Building and Equipment Committee. Chairman Li Siguang was a geologist, and Secretary Ye Yaguo was a forest scientist, who was familiar with the geographical environment outside Wuchang. Ye Yaguo believed that "the area around Wuchang East Lake is the most suitable site for the university, and its natural scenery is not unique to domestic schools, but also rare in foreign universities." After a field investigation by all the members, in November 1928, it was determined that the new campus would be located on the shore of the scenic East Lake outside Wuchang City, and in the area of Luojiashan (also known as Luojiashan) and Shizishan, far away from the downtown. It was based on the ideal model of famous foreign university campuses, and also in line with the concept of distant site selection in Chinese traditional culture that "the benevolent enjoy mountains, and the wise enjoy water." Li Siguang and Ye Yaguo recommended F. H. Kales as the architectural engineer of the new campus and went to Shanghai to invite Kales. After a field investigation, Kaiers believed that the hills in this area were gentle and had abundant water resources. Rocks, springs, and lake water could all be used. Building buildings along the hills could save foundations and stones, so he agreed to use Luojia Mountain as the school site. Later, Wen Yiduo renamed it "Luojia Mountain".

In March 1929, because Luojia Mountain and its vicinity were all barren fields and narrow paths, the school wrote to the Hubei Provincial Construction Department to start building a special highway connecting Jiedaokou. However, because the road construction and relocation of graves violated the filial piety of some grave owners, they united to petition the Hubei Provincial Government and asked it to stop it. Therefore, the provincial government asked Wuhan University to stop construction and find a new campus on the grounds that the new campus occupied too much civilian land. In the same month, the acting president Liu Shuqi resigned due to busy affairs. So the Ministry of Education appointed Wang Shijie as the first president of Wuhan University. At the beginning of his tenure in May, he devoted himself to the demarcation, surveying, planning and construction of the new campus on Luojia Mountain. Together with Mr. Ye Yaguo, he led dozens of migrant workers to dig up all the graves blocking the road overnight, creating an irreversible fait accompli. Although the grave owners reported the matter to the central government, it was of no avail. The 10-meter-wide and 1.5-kilometer-long road was eventually completed according to the original route and opened to traffic in February 1930. It was named University Road. He also invited relevant provincial government officials to visit Luojia Mountain in person. They all agreed that the place had beautiful scenery, with mountains and water. Building a school here would inspire culture and be particularly beneficial to Wuhan residents.

At the same time, survey and planning began on March 18, and the main axis was determined by Li Siguang's survey. Miao Enzhao led his assistant Shen Zhongqing and another four surveyors to start the survey and drawing work of the new school building. After five months of hard work, the survey task was completed on time. When Kaiers was conceiving the drawings, he often stood on the mountain for several hours, and completed the general design drawing half a year later. In August, the provincial government announced the red line of the campus, bounded by East Lakeside in the east, Tea Harbor in the west, Guozheng Lake in the north, and from East Lakeside to Tea Harbor Bridgehead in the south, with a total area of more than 3,000 acres. The school bought the land for the school building at the price of seven silver dollars per acre of paddy field and five silver dollars per acre of mountain land. The owner of the mountain surnamed Luo was reluctant to give up his "feng shui treasure land" at first, and Shi Ying, then director of the Provincial Government Construction Department, personally went to persuade and mobilize. At that time, there were many ancestral graves on the mountain that needed to be moved. More than a hundred grave owners obstructed the demarcation and construction of the new school site on the grounds that the new school building would destroy the feng shui. They even gathered villagers to go to Wang Shijie's hometown to dig up his ancestral graves. The provincial education director even instigated people to cause trouble at the construction site. Wang said, "You can dig up all the ancestral graves, but the Luojia school building must be built."Zeng Zhaoan, a member of the National Wuhan University Preparatory Committee, followed Wang Shijie's instructions and organized a professorial committee to argue with the Ministry of Education that "a good place like Luojia Mountain should be used to build a school, and no president or chairman can stop it." The result was approval. Shi Ying also actively supported Wang Shijie and sternly refuted those who opposed the relocation of graves, saying, "Building a school is a long-term plan, don't be superstitious about feng shui."

In October 1929, the Building Equipment Committee officially hired Kells as the construction engineer of the new school building and approved the general design drawing. In addition, Abraham Levenspiel and Richard Sachse were also hired. as an assistant. Miao Enzhao, Kells's classmate and friend at MIT, was also hired as the supervising engineer and head of the engineering department of the new campus, responsible for construction technical supervision and partial structural and plumbing design. Under his strict and conscientious technical supervision, the construction quality of these projects was ensured, and the main structure is still as solid as ever. The projects were constructed by Han Xiesheng, Yuan Ruitai, Yongmaolong and other construction companies and Shanghai Liuhe Company. The water, sanitation and heating projects of the school building were mainly contracted by Hanhua Company. In March 1930, the new school building project started. Shen Zhusan, the owner of Han Xiesheng Construction Factory, firmly believes that "quality is fundamental" and requires Wuhan University projects to focus on a warranty period of more than 100 years, select high-quality materials, and strictly inspect everything, even after he suffered a heavy blow from blindness. , still insisted that both parties should send engineers and supervisors to supervise and inspect the quality at any time. Once problems are discovered during construction, they will be reworked at all costs.

In May 1930, the 60-year-old Kaiers fell ill in Shanghai, but he still insisted on working. On March 7, 1932, President Wang Shijie said in a speech in the auditorium of the new school building: "Here we have to thank Mr. Kaiers the most. He can be said to be an artist. He does not care about the remuneration, but puts his interest completely on art... The help he gave us is really great!" In order to thank and commemorate Kaiers' contribution to the construction of the new school building, Wuhan University awarded him the title of honorary engineer. Shen Zhongqing later became the first director of the Wuhan University Architecture Design Office. On May 26, 1932, Wang Shijie said at the inauguration ceremony of the new campus on Luojia Mountain: "Twelve years ago, Li Siguang and I had imagined on our way back to China that we would build a university in a place with mountains and water. Today, this wish has come true." Finally, he pointed out: "The construction of our university is only half completed. From now on, we need the guidance and help of the central and local governments. Our construction is not only material construction, but also the greatest spiritual construction. Whether in academic construction or cultural undertakings, we are working hard. Please see if the path we are taking is the way out for the Chinese nation and the way for mankind to move forward!" At the same time, Wang Shijie and Ye Ya'ge personally led teachers and students to plant trees on Luojia Mountain, planting 500,000 trees in half a year, making the Chinese and Western architectural complex in the garden-like campus more beautiful and spectacular. In 1933, after the completion of the first phase of the project, Zeng Zhaoan organized the compilation and publication of the "National Wuhan University Architecture Photo Album", which contained 41 exquisite photos.

The first phase of the project cost 1.5 million silver dollars (due to inflation, the actual cost was 1.7 million silver dollars), with the central government and the Hubei provincial government each contributing 750,000 silver dollars, and Li Zongren allocating 200,000 silver dollars to fund the project. For the second phase, the central government and the Hubei provincial government each contributed another 750,000 silver dollars. The rest was raised by the committee members through various channels, such as the Sino-British Boxer Indemnity Fund, the Hankou Municipal Government, the Hunan Provincial Government, and the China Education and Culture Foundation, totaling 4 million silver dollars.

- Phase I (March 1930-January 1932): College of Arts, College of Science, male dormitory, student dining hall and club, first and second residential areas for faculty and staff, sports field, National Wuhan University archway, etc., totaling 13 items;
- Phase II (February 1932 - July 1937): 17 projects in total, including the library, gymnasium, Central China Hydraulic Experiment Station, Luojiashan Water Tower, internship factory, power plant, some living quarters, law school, science school (expansion), engineering school, and agricultural school (unfinished);
- Unfinished projects: Medical school, auditorium, general office were not built due to insufficient funds.

== Development experience ==
=== Move west to Leshan period ===
In March and April 1938, Wuhan was surrounded on three sides by the Japanese, and the university was forced to move west to Leshan, Sichuan, where the Luojiashan campus became the military command center for the Nationalist Government to lead the national Resistance until the fall of Wuhan. Luojiashan had deep and large bomb shelters with anti-aircraft gun positions lined up around them. Every time the Japanese aircraft passed over the Loya Mountain, they never bombed. From March 29 to April 1, 1938, the provisional National Congress of the Chinese Kuomintang was held in the sports hall and library of the National University of Wuhan (the opening ceremony was held in Chongqing), at which the famous "Anti-Japanese War and founding Program" was formulated, and Chiang Kai-shek was elected president of the Kuomintang (Chiang Kai-shek was called "president" from then on), Wang Jingwei was elected vice president, and the leadership system was established. Chiang Kai-shek, Zhou Enlai and Guo Moruo all lived in Wu University, leading the army and people to resist Japan, meeting foreign friends, and conveying the determination of the Chinese nation to the world. Chiang Kai-shek also set up a senior officer training Corps in Luojiashan, and personally served as the head, inspected the officers, regardless of personal safety, and personally watched the fierce air battle of the Chinese Air Force against the Japanese. On August 2, 1938, led by Zhou Enlai, the main leaders of the Kuomintang and the Communist Party convened the "General Mobilization Committee of the Ninth Theater Command" in the student canteen, which was responsible for organizing an organized and planned evacuation of the whole people in Wuhan, saving many effective forces for the Anti-Japanese War, and crushing the Japanese aggressions' delusion of "wiping out China in three months."

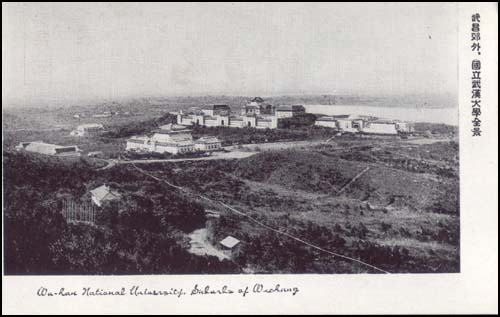
Postcards issued during the Japanese occupation

As Guo Moruo speculated in Hongbo Qu, the reason why Luojiashan was not bombed was because the Japanese "wanted to remain intact for their own good." On October 26, 1938, Wuchang abandoned the defense, and the Japanese Army turned the Luojiashan campus into its original headquarters, "the purpose of goodwill" "to preserve the original appearance." The headquarters was stationed in the library, and four watchtowers were built on the four corners of the library roof. A dungeon was also built in the school to detain anti-Japanese activists. The student dining hall and club became the field hospital and the officers' club, and the boys' dormitory became the inpatient department. The colleges of Arts, Science and Engineering are used by a large number of civilian staff, while the eighteen are occupied by senior officials. The attached middle School became a vehicle dispatch yard, and the former post office was located near a horse stable. Behind the unbuilt auditorium (now a small nursery after the humanities hall) became a military horse farm, and the Japanese army introduced water flowers and plants from Japan to feed military horses. In order to ease the homesickness of the large number of wounded Japanese soldiers who stayed here to recuperate, and also to show off their martial arts skills and long-term occupation, the Japanese army brought cherry blossoms from Japan to plant on the campus of Wu University in 1939. During the Anti-Japanese War, the Luojiashan school building was preserved as a whole, but its interior suffered serious damage and underwent large-scale renovation after the end of the war.

=== Department adjustment period ===
In 1952, Li Da became the president of Wu University, and the school specially built a small garden, namely Li Da's former residence. In December 1954, the college of Water Resources of Wuhan University was split into the Wuhan College of Water Resources, and the building of the College of Agriculture was also divided into office buildings. In the late 1950s, a physics building and a biology building were constructed on either side of the original auditorium site. Some dormitories of traditional ethnic style on the second floor of the school and in the Guiyuan and Plum Gardens were also built during this period.

=== Cultural Revolution ===
During this period, some slogans inevitably appeared on early buildings, such as the five characters "Long Live Chairman Mao" on the library, and the eight characters "Wish Chairman Mao a Long Life" on the main building of the School of Engineering, which was used as an administrative building. Slogans such as "Three Loyalties and Four Infinites" were painted on the outer walls of the old dormitory and the School of Arts and Law. Mao Zedong's poems were painted on both sides of the entrances and exits of the old dormitory as couplets. There was even a slogan "Down with Liu Shaoqi" written in ink on a wall. These products of a specific ideology can still be vaguely seen today. The six characters "National Wuhan University" on the archway at the entrance of the street were replaced by the four characters "Wuhan University". These four characters were taken from the envelope of a private letter that Mao Zedong sent back to Chen Wenxin, a student of the School of Agriculture of Wuhan University in May 1951 (the fonts on the name of Wuhan University and the centennial anniversary logo used as the school emblem are all in the new "Chen Mao style" style). In addition, the biological specimen building located between the School of Science and the Biological Building was also built during this period, but it destroyed the coordination of the early buildings.

=== Reform and opening up period ===
On the occasion of the school anniversary in 1983, the four characters "Wuhan University" on the archway at the entrance of the street were replaced by the six characters "National Wuhan University" written by calligrapher Cao Lian'an. As the archway is located in an area that is no longer within the scope of the Wuhan University campus, the archway has been neglected and has gradually fallen into disrepair. In 1993, the Wuhan Municipal People's Government announced that the early buildings of Wuhan University were excellent historical buildings preserved in Wuhan. The campus makes full use of its own superior geographical conditions and long history and culture, so that artificial landscapes are organically combined with natural landscapes, and cultural attractions and natural scenery complement each other. On the eve of the centenary celebration in 1993, a new archway was built at the main entrance of Wuhan University on Bayi Road, modeled on the old archway of "National Wuhan University" at the entrance of the street, as the school gate of Wuhan University. In July 2000, Wuhan City demarcated the protection range of Wuhan University's early buildings as 20 meters to 48 meters around the buildings, and the construction control zone was the main campus of Wuhan University on Luojia Mountain.

In November 1990, the Humanities and Science Museum was built with a donation from Sir Run Run and a grant from the State Education Commission. The site of the Humanities Hall is exactly the location of the auditorium in the earlier buildings planned in that year, and it forms a group of buildings on both sides of the physical and biological buildings, and the old library building and the administration building (old Institute of Technology) building. The pavilion, designed by Shen Guoyao, has a "mountain" shape and a green glazed roof. In 1991, in the second batch of Shaw Grant construction projects organized by the State Education Commission, the Humanities Hall won the first prize, and Professor Song Zefen of Tsinghua University, one of the members of the expert review group, described it as "the most beautiful building in the most beautiful university campus in China". Mr. Run Run Shaw also praised, "There are not many new buildings that can be compared with your new building." In 1994, in the architectural evaluation of Wuhan since the reform and opening up, the Humanities Hall was rated as one of the top ten buildings.

=== Current state of the buildings ===
Entering the 21st century, the university established a special protection committee, formulated protection measures and maintenance plans, and adhered to the principles of both protection and restoration, and maintaining the original appearance. However, in fact, some of the newly built buildings on the Wuhan University campus do not have a well-coordinated style with the earlier buildings on the campus, and the different buildings within them. The restoration and protection of the earlier buildings did not really follow the principle of "restoring the old as it was". Some parts of the buildings were severely damaged by wind erosion or human factors and needed good maintenance and repair. For example, before the 110th anniversary of the university in 2003, the restoration of the School of Science not only failed to achieve the effect of restoring the old as it was, but also backfired. There are also trees growing on the roof, which constantly threaten the life of the cultural relics. For example, when repairing the four dormitories in the Sakura Garden, they just knocked off the weak wall skin and then applied a new layer of lime, which was extremely inconsistent. In 2004, the university's infrastructure department even used the word "brand new" to describe the renovation of the Luojia Mountain Water Tower.

On September 16, 2005, Mr. Shiges' granddaughter visited Wuhan University and presented the university with some precious historical photos and pictures. On November 16 of the same year, Mr. Levenspiel's son, Octave Levenspiel, a member of the U.S. National Academy of Engineering, visited Wuhan University and presented the university with all of his father's more than 150 drawings and photos of Wuhan University's early buildings. In July 2014, these drawings, together with some drawings originally preserved in the Wuhan University Archives, totaling 177 drawings, were identified as national first-class cultural relics.

In order to welcome the 120th anniversary of the university, and in view of the serious decay of some of the early buildings and media reports and appeals, Wuhan University began the first comprehensive renovation of the early buildings since its founding in 2011. In September 2011, the first Cultural Relics Protection and Management Committee of universities in China was established, and the Cultural Relics Protection and Management Office was also established. The renovation of the early buildings was also officially included in the Wuhan University 120th Anniversary Donation Project (Phase I), and the above projects were completed before the 2013 anniversary. Among them, Zhou Enlai's former residence was restored and renamed Zhou Enlai's Former Residence and Historical and Cultural Education Base, which was officially opened on November 21; the old library was officially opened as the school history museum on November 28.

In addition, in order to make way for the Bayi Road underground tunnel, one of the municipal engineering projects in Wuhan, in October 2012, Wuhan University demolished the imitation "National Wuhan University" archway built in 1993. This move attracted widespread attention both inside and outside the school. After extensive solicitation and expert discussion, in January 2013, the infrastructure department officially announced the construction plan for the Wuhan University Gate Square. The location of the new archway will be more than ten meters north of the location of the demolished archway and will be enlarged by 1.12 times. The entire project was completed on November 20.

The newly built school buildings during this period, such as the library expansion project, the liberal arts district building complex, and the Yangjiawan building complex, maintained a correspondence and coordination with the earlier buildings in appearance and color matching. The old library and the administrative building (old engineering school) were selected as the "five Wuhan city landmarks" by public vote at the first and second Wuhan Design Biennales. On June 27, 2014, the founding meeting of the Professional Committee of Historical Architecture of Colleges and Universities of the Chinese Society of Cultural RelicsChinese Society of Cultural Relics was held at Wuhan University, and Li Xiaohong was elected as the first president.

== Building Introduction ==
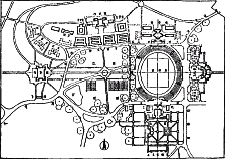
National Wuhan University Campus Planning Drawing

The design of Kaiers follows the requirements of the Building Equipment Committee of "practical, solid, economical, beautiful, and traditional Chinese appearance", runs through the idea of "axial symmetry, orderly main and subordinate, central hall, and high buildings in the four corners" of traditional Chinese architecture, adopts the method of "taking the momentum from afar and the quality from near", has a deep understanding of the environment, and cleverly uses the terrain. It adopts the advantages of Chinese and Western architectural forms, combines the beauty of classical and modern architecture, and pioneered the architectural style at that time. According to the topography of Luojia Mountain and the development requirements of modern higher education, the overall planning of the campus has distinct characteristics. The campus buildings adopt a scattered and radial layout according to their respective functions, and follow the aesthetic principles of traditional Chinese architecture. The building groups change in an orderly manner due to the terrain of the mountain. The entire campus has strict fragments in the free pattern, forming a rich and diverse group. These building groups form counterpoints and scenes with each other, and they are viewed from all sides, which maximizes the level of environmental space. Appreciating the campus buildings of Luojia Mountain is not "looking", but "wandering", with different scenery and endless charm. A large number of new structures, new materials and new technologies, which were still in the exploration stage in the Western architectural community at that time, were successfully used in the design and construction of Wuhan University's early buildings, and influenced later Chinese buildings, marking a milestone in the history of China's architectural development.

The central area of the campus is formed by the intersection of two north–south axes and two east–west axes to form two large groups of buildings. The overall planning is based on the terrain of the mountain. The central area of the campus is planned in the area surrounded by mountains on the east, south and north sides, and the west side is a low-lying area. The low-lying area is used as a sports field, and the stands are built along the slope. The building complex is arranged on the upper side of the concave school front road outside the stands. The School of Engineering is built on the south mountain (Huoshi Mountain), the School of Science is built on the north mountain (Xiaogui Mountain), and the auditorium is planned on the ridge on the east side. A group of buildings is formed with the sports field as the center and the auditorium as the main body. The School of Engineering and the School of Science are located at the north and south ends of the 400-meter center line of the sports field, respectively, and are the left and right wings of the auditorium. The auditorium and the gymnasium are upright on the east–west axis of the sports field. The sports field is west of the mountain (500 meters long from east to west and more than 200 meters wide from north to south). The terrain drops sharply, which is the sunken central garden of the campus. The gymnasium is below it. Thus, a north–south axis running through the School of Engineering and the School of Science, and an east–west axis extending from the auditorium to the gymnasium to the west of the stadium are formed. The space echoes, the terrain is staggered, the composition is well-organized, yet very vivid and in line with the terrain. The Lion Mountain on the northwest side of the central area overlooks the East Lake from the east and north, and the outline of the top of the Lion Mountain can also be seen from the East Lake, forming another group of buildings with the library as the main body. The Lion Mountain in the hilly area of Beishan sits south and faces north. The library is prominent in the center of the top of the mountain; the east and west wings are the School of Arts and the School of Law, standing opposite each other; the student dormitory on the south is built on the slope. The flying eaves and green tiles are hidden in the green trees, making the mountain look more lush and staggered. The overall unity of the construction of Wuhan University's campus has the characteristics of group and single buildings. There is plenty of sunshine in winter and the south wind blows in summer, which complements and adds to the beautiful scenery of lakes and mountains.

=== National Wuhan University Archway ===
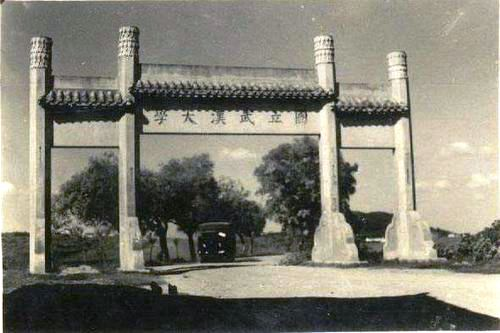
The old archway from 1937

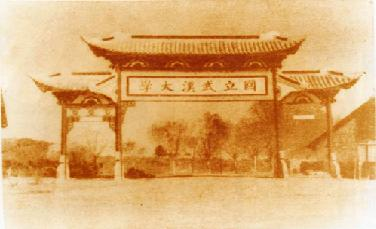
The earliest old archway

The old archway, which was originally located on the side of the starting point of University Road at Jiefangkou, symbolizing the school gate, was rebuilt twice in history. The first time was a wooden structure with four columns and glazed eaves. The structure was simple, and the gold-painted and lacquered paintings were unique. There is no exact record of the construction date (probably 1931). According to the analysis of photos in the graduation yearbooks of Wuhan University, the wooden archway should have been completed before June 1934. Unfortunately, it was destroyed by a tornado the following year. Therefore, it is difficult to figure out who wrote the words on the archway (probably Wang Shijie). According to the analysis of historical photos, the second time it was built was estimated to be in the summer of 1937. The archway is a reinforced concrete structure with four columns and three rooms. The four octagonal columns (four columns and eight sides) express the welcome to students from all directions; the cloud pattern on the capitals expresses the depth and nobility of higher education institutions. The color of the glazed tiles on top is peacock blue, second only to the royal bright yellow. It is still unclear who wrote the six characters "National Wuhan University" on the front of the archway (it may be Xiao Junjiang, a professor of mathematics), while the six characters "Literature, Law, Science, Engineering, Agriculture and Medicine" on the back were written by Liu Ze (Liu Boping), a professor of Chinese, indicating the ideal scale of Wuhan University. Mr. Liu's calligraphy is unique, and Guo Moruo once praised his calligraphy as a "treasure".

=== June 1st Memorial Pavilion ===
See June 1st Massacre

Located on the east side of Xuefu Road between Luojia Mountain and Shizi Mountain, south of Songqing Gymnasium, in front of the fourth teaching building, it was built in November 1947 to commemorate the martyrs who died in the June 1st Massacre and completed in April 1948. The hexagonal eaves, green tiles, and six red columns all represent the meaning of June. Holly and green grass are planted around the pavilion. The pavilion is about 7 meters high, with a wooden structure on the top and cement-injected red columns on the bottom. There is a stone monument in the pavilion, which is 1.46 meters high and about 0.58 meters wide.

=== stadium ===
Also known as Songqing Gymnasium. Completed in July 1936, the gymnasium is about 35.05 meters long and 21.34 meters wide. After Li Yuanhong (Zi Songqing) died of illness in Tianjin, he wanted to be reburied at the southern foot of Luojia Mountain (there were no lush forests on Luojia Mountain at that time. When the weather was fine, you could clearly see nine dragon ridges on the mountain, which was known as the Feng Shui treasure land of nine dragons playing with pearls), but the school did not agree. Later, Li Yuanhong's two sons, Li Shaoji and Li Shaoye, donated 100,000 yuan (Zhongxing Coal Mine stocks) that Li Yuanhong used to build Jianghan University to Wuhan University for construction. The gymnasium is surrounded by corridors, using reinforced concrete beams and columns, and the roof is supported by a three-hinged arch with a span of more than 30 meters. This was a very advanced Western construction technology at the time. The front stand has Chinese-style heavy eaves - three eaves dripping water, and the gymnasium also has brackets that are only used in palaces or high-standard temples. There are stands inside and an observation deck outside. Kaiers originally wanted to build a swimming pool in front of the museum, but it was not adopted. At the same time, it was planned to build a memorial hall for the first uprising of the 1911 Revolution in the museum, but it failed due to the outbreak of the Anti-Japanese War. The roof is covered with green glazed tiles, and the height difference of the dense eaves is used for lighting and ventilation. The side walls are frame structures, and the gables are Baroque. It is a typical Chinese and Western architecture. In 1947, the memorial for the June 1st Massacre of Wuhan University was held here.

=== Male dormitory ===
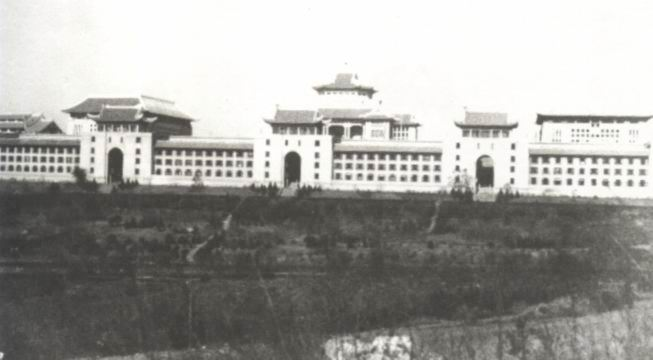
Panoramic view of dormitories, canteen, library, and the School of Arts and Law

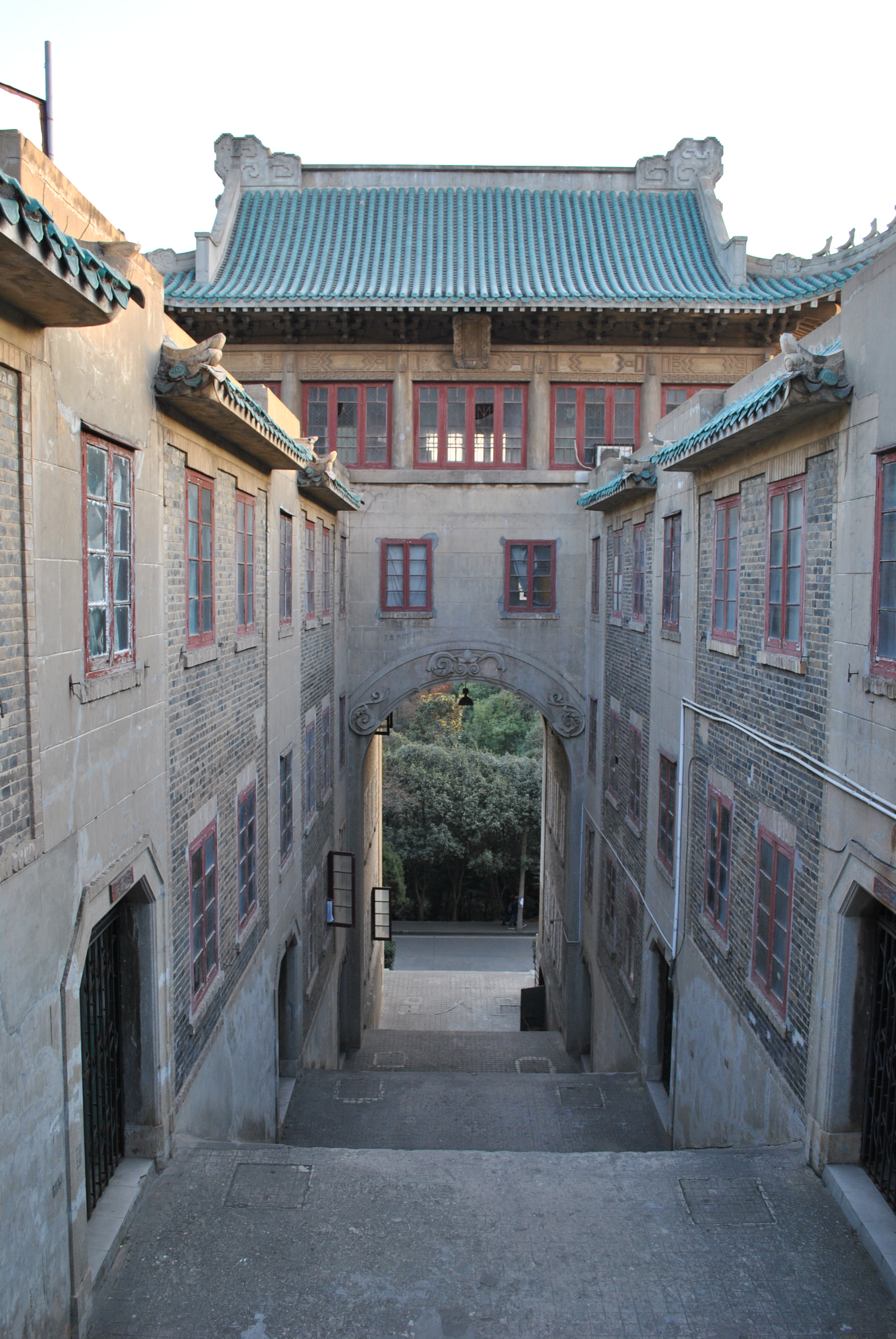
Dormitory round arch

Also known as the Old Dormitory and also named "Cherry Blossom Castle" because it is close to cherry blossoms, it is a glazed tile building imitating the Potala Palace. It was completed in September 1931. The cost at that time was 550,000 yuan. The dormitory was built along the southern slope of Lion Mountain and has good sunshine conditions. The main body of the building is mainly in the gray color of granite, which looks simple, generous, heavy and steady. The entrance is built with multiple layers of stairs, with a unified appearance and magnificent momentum. In order to highlight its guiding nature, on this basis, the upper part of the arch is padded with a layer to make a single-eaved hip-and-gable pavilion on the top. The city tower in the middle is located on the same axis with the library. The Dormitory is divided into four units, with a total of 16 entrances and exits. Four dormitories are lined up in a row, plus three circular arches with gatehouses. The dormitories on each floor are named after the "Heaven and earth are dark yellow, the universe is vast and wild. The sun and the moon are full and empty, and the stars are lined up" (among which, the word "辰" is mistakenly written as "晨") in the "Thousand Character Classic". The size of a single room is 3.3 meters wide and 4.5 meters long, with a usable area of 13 square meters and a built-in closet. There are more than 300 rooms in total. The building plan adopts a combination of different levels of mountain-based combinations, which cleverly conforms to the changes in natural terrain and uses the mountain to form a majestic facade effect. At different elevations, houses of different levels are built along the contour lines. The ground floor of each row of houses is at different heights, while the roof is on the same plane, forming a "flat sky and uneven ground" pattern, with a sense of winding paths leading to secluded places. The reinforced concrete flat roof is connected to the front area of the library to form a large square. The two-unit dormitory is equipped with 95 steps (originally 108 steps, but the bottom floor has been submerged by the raised roadbed) as the path to the library on the front road of the school, and it is also the main staircase of the dormitory. The inscription "National Wuhan University was built in the 19th year of the Republic of China" is said to be written by Yan Shutang.

=== library ===
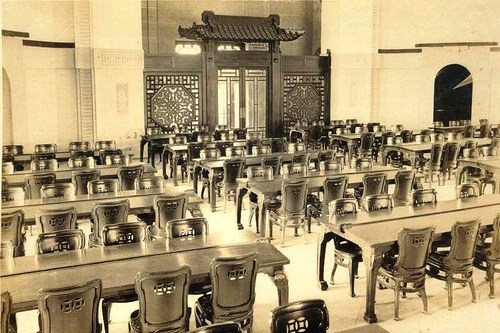

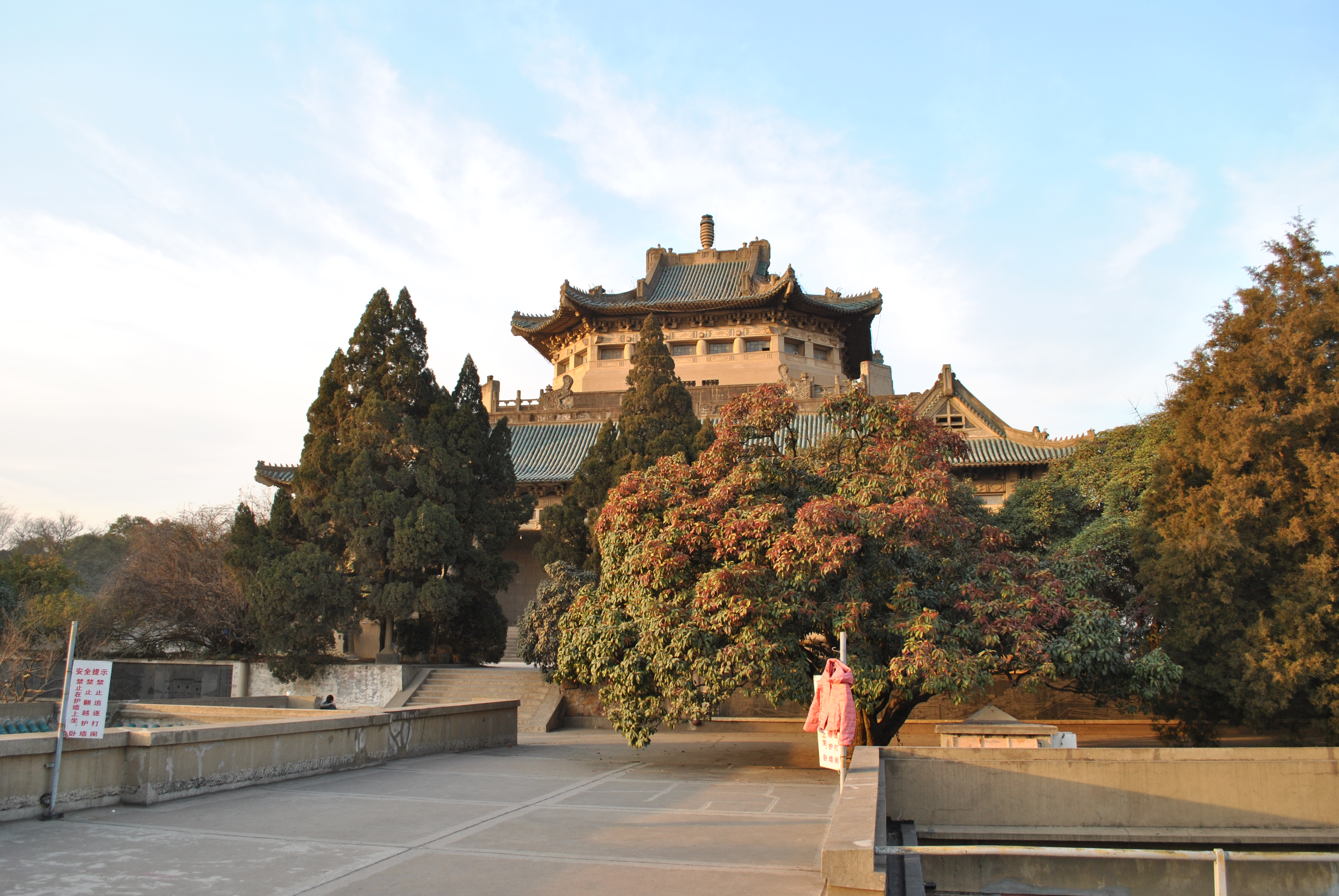

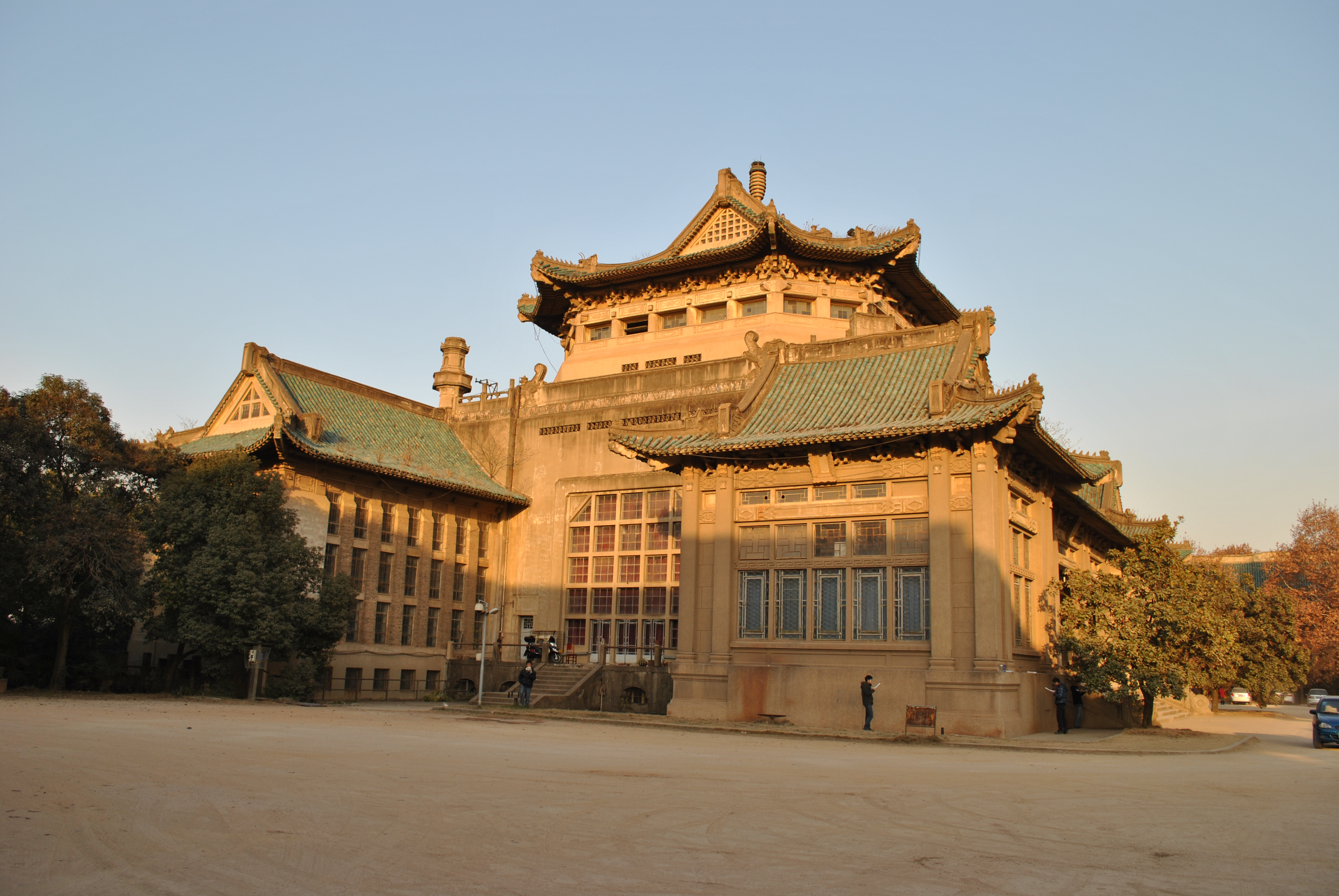

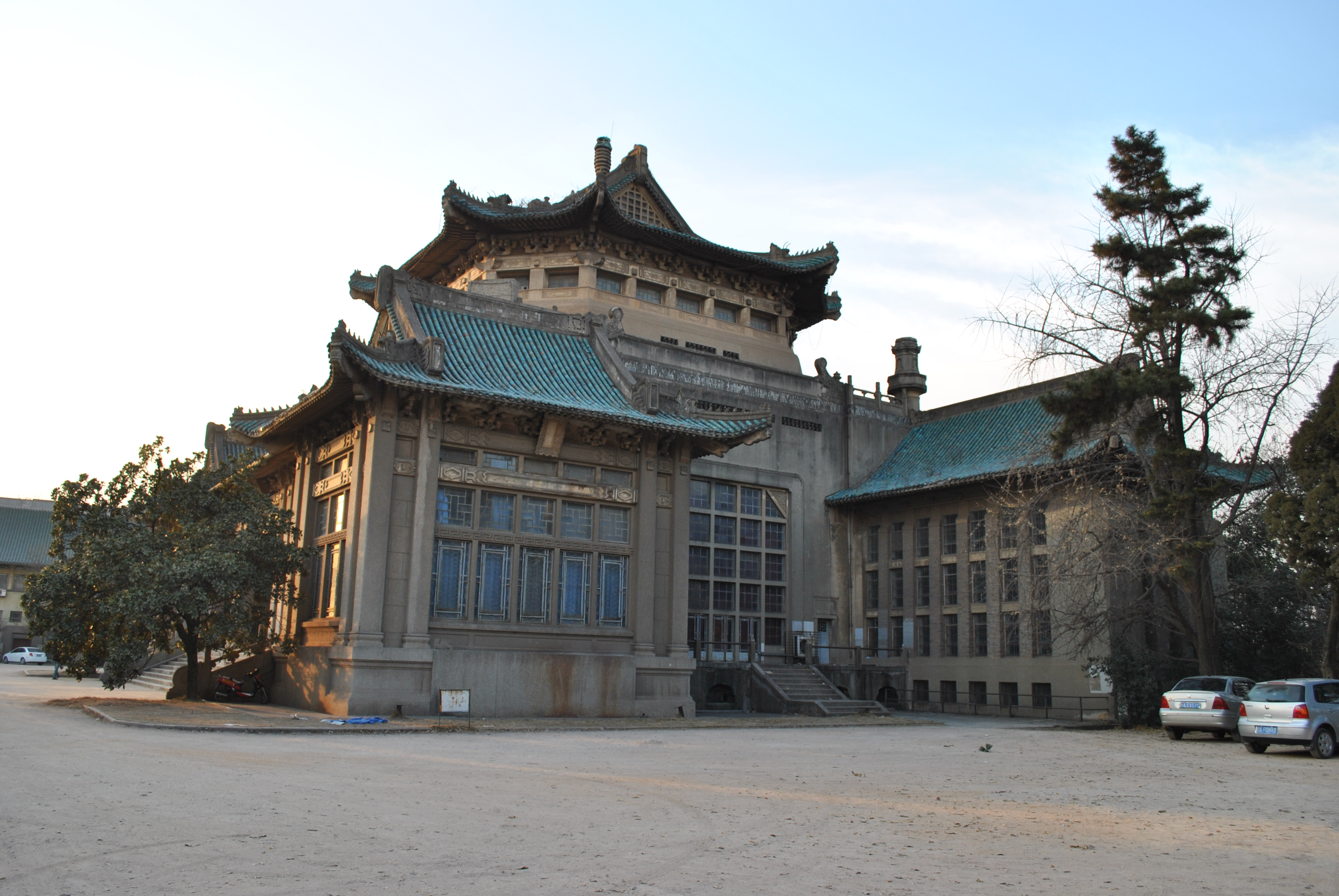

The crown-shaped building imitating the Forbidden City, located on the top of Lion Mountain, is also the tallest building at the foot of Luojia Mountain and the spiritual symbol of Wuhan University. It was completed in September 1935. During the construction of the library project, due to the incorrect bricklaying method of the wall, the load-bearing capacity did not meet the design requirements. Miao Enzhao required the construction party to take reinforcement measures and add four pairs of reinforced concrete columns at the four corners of the large reading room to meet the load-bearing requirements. This reinforcement measure increased the construction unit's cost by 20,000 yuan. Because the construction party made the corner of the house into a southern-style upturned shape instead of a northern-style flat shape, it was required to rework and rebuild. The exterior decoration is very traditional Chinese. The top tower is an octagonal eaves, single-eaved double-hipped style. The seven-ring Bao ding on top also has the function of exhaust. There is a heating chimney on the roof, a thick corner stone at the south corner, and a small tower at the north corner. The guardrails in between are hooked rails on the left and right and double dragon kisses in the center, creating a "surrounding ridge" effect. The ridges of the two auxiliary buildings are connected to the large reading room, which is called "hipped ridge". Above the gate is a hollow iron portrait of Laozi. The front 5 rooms and the middle 3 rooms are large reading rooms, with auxiliary buildings on both sides and a bookstore building at the two corners.

The library is in the shape of a Chinese character "工", and consists of five parts: catalog hall, search hall, reading hall, bookstore and auxiliary service hall. The bookstore has a usable area of about 1,186 square meters and can store nearly 2 million books. The design of the library breaks through the traditional style of Chinese classical architecture in terms of plane layout and spatial organization. Semi-circular stairs are set at the four corners of the inner corridor. The main entrance on the south side is a three-bay single-hole door, which uses both Western double-linked columns and Chinese classical architecture's brackets and Architrve; the tiles and Dougong are all based on the architectural style of the Qing Dynasty. The top floor of the central main body is an octagon. The outer wall of the underground floor of the bookstore on the north side is divided, and there is a hook on it to form a tall pedestal. The connection between the two libraries is treated as follows: the outer wall of the underground floor has large glass windows composed of square windows as units, and there is a loft with five windows protruding in the center above the "ridge" of the second floor. The museum is a masterpiece that embodies the mutual penetration and integration of Chinese and Western architectural design theories, skills and techniques. It is also the first successful work in China's modern architectural history to adopt new structures, new materials and new technologies (reinforced concrete frame and steel truss hybrid structure) to imitate Chinese classical architecture, reflecting the cultural trends, science and technology and the spirit of the times at that time.

=== Student dining hall and club ===
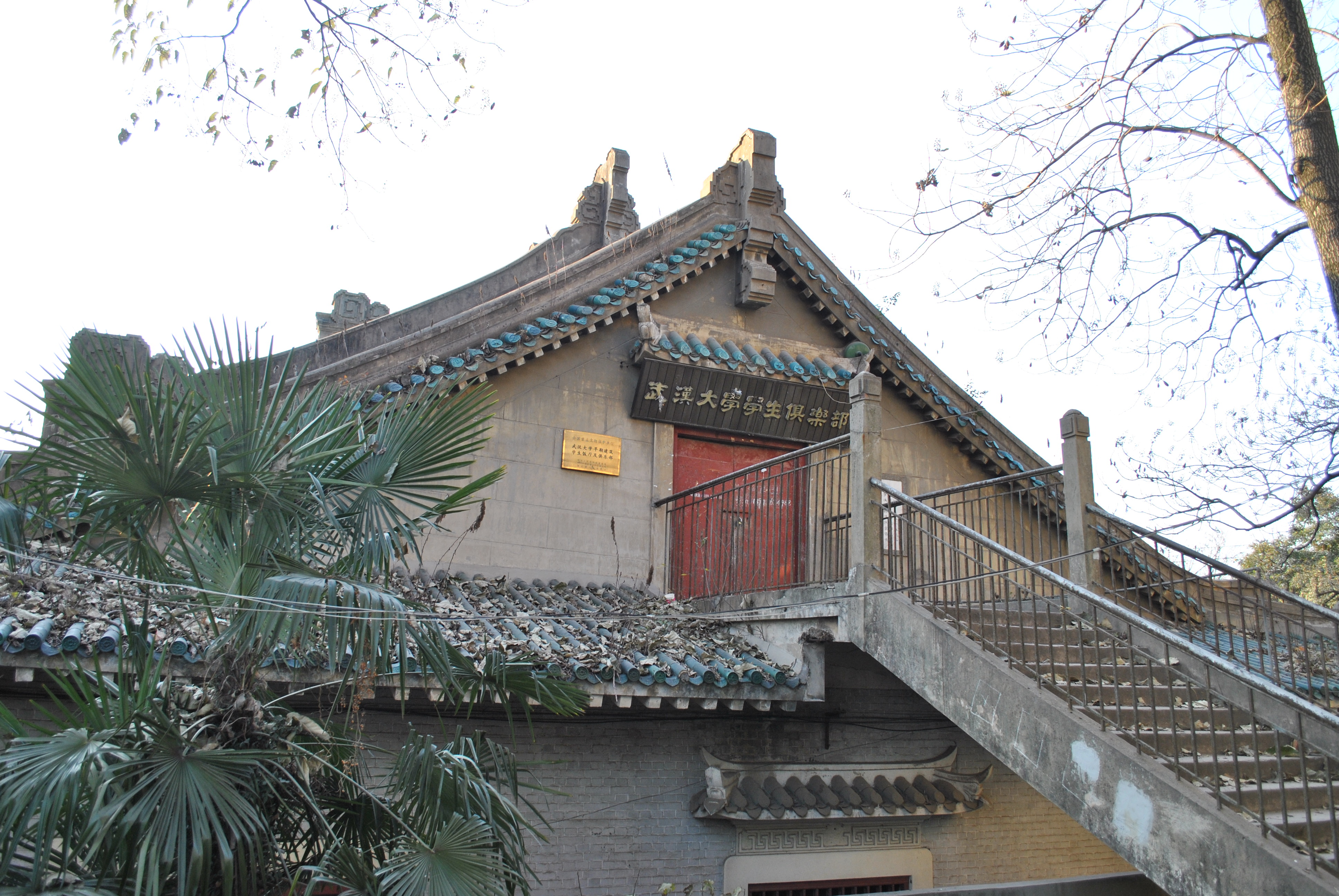

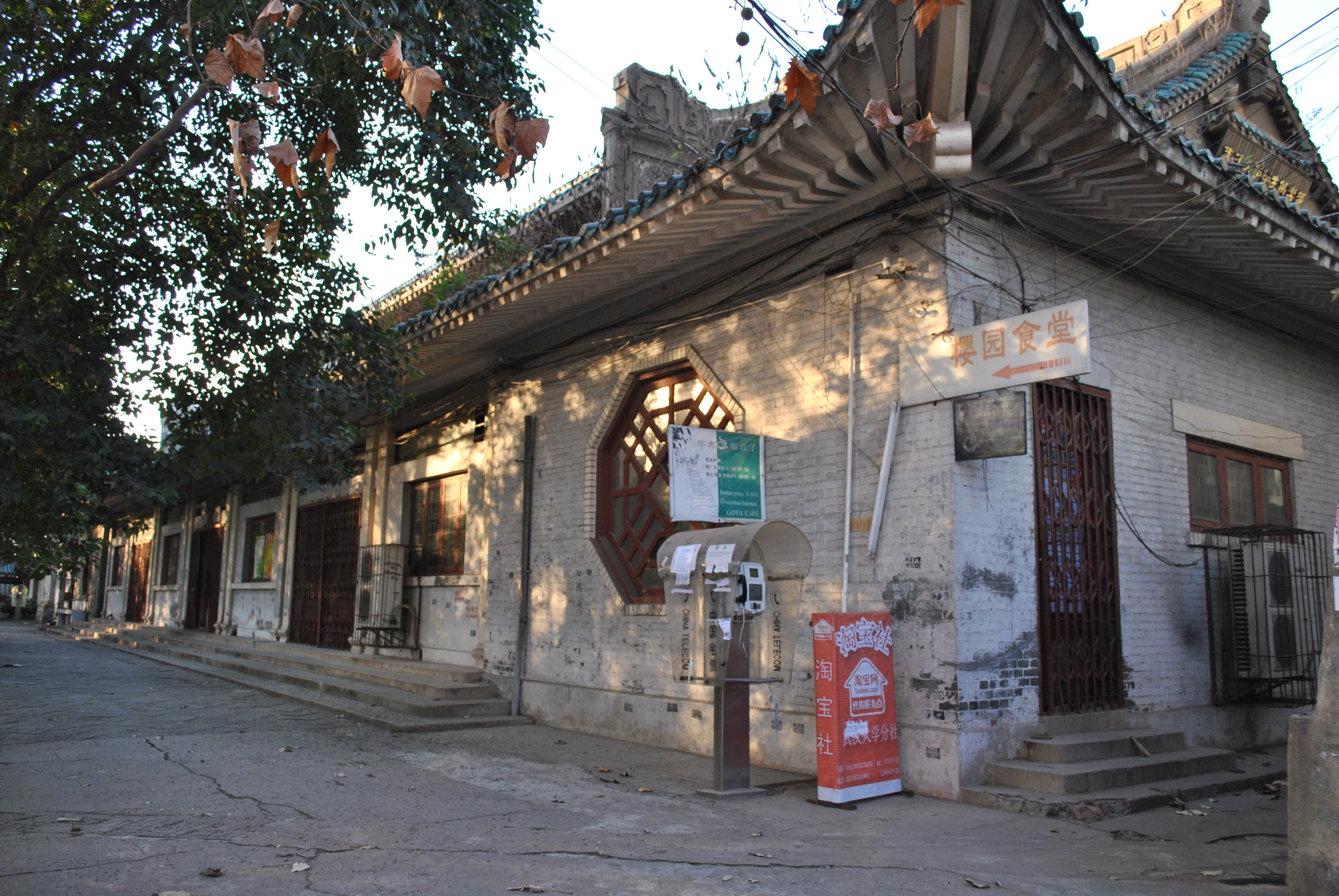

Located to the west of the Law School, it was completed in September 1931. The lower floor is the dining room. Behind the boiler room in the dining room, there is a kitchen god with a special shrine. The upper floor is the club (temporary auditorium), and the interior decoration is very folk. There are three layers of halberd patterns on the beams, which is called "three halberds for consecutive promotions", which means blessing students to be promoted three levels in a row. There is a picture of "bats (blessings) in front of you" on the brackets. The bats open their eyes and look at the copper coins under their chins. Cai Yuanpei, Hu Shi, Zhang Boling, Zhang Junmai, Zhou Enlai, Dong Biwu, Chen Duxiu, Chiang Kai-shek, Wang Jingwei, Chen Lifu, Li Zongren, Oskar Trautmann, John Leighton Stuart and other Chinese and foreign dignitaries have given speeches here.

=== Faculty of Letters and Law ===
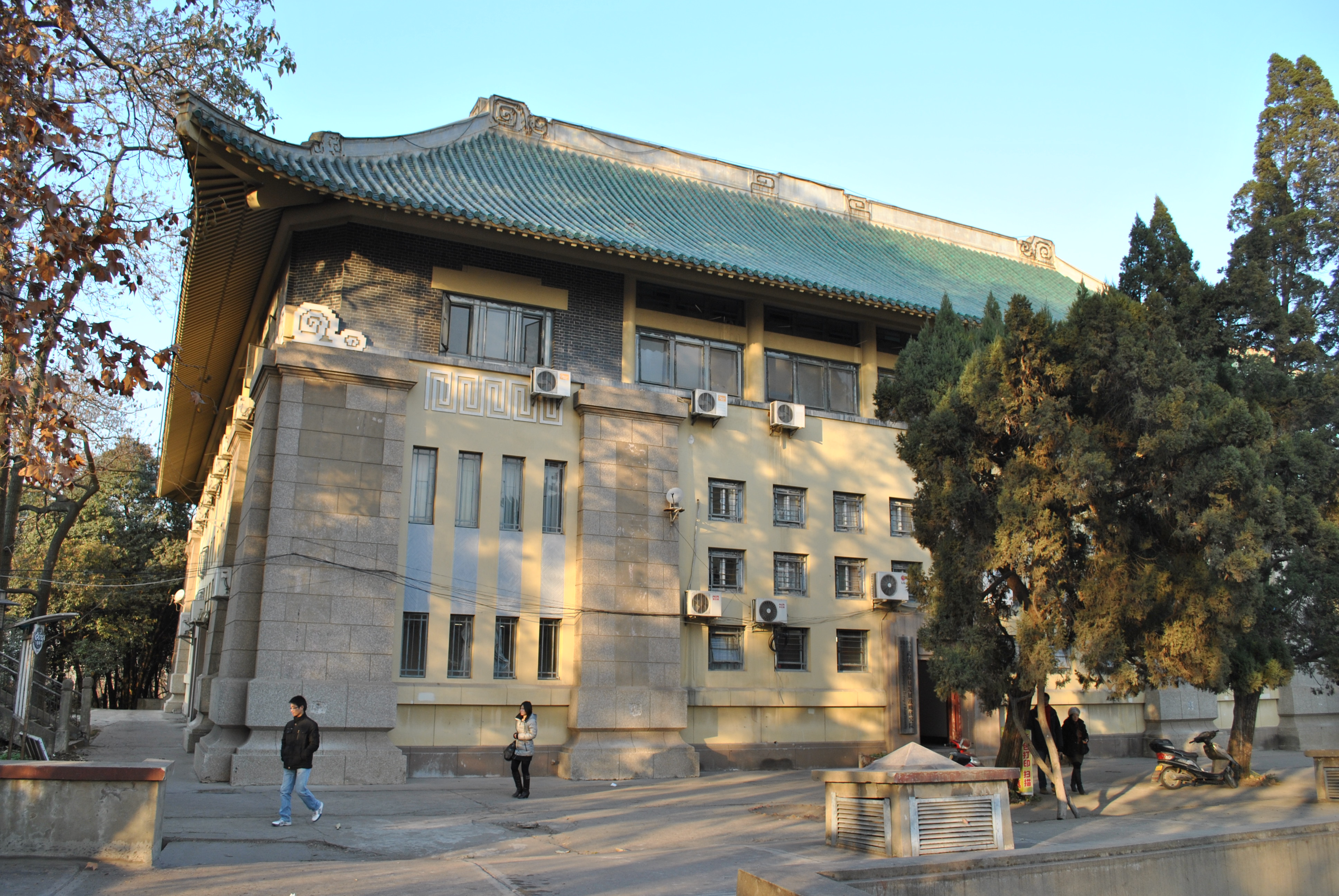
Close-up of the Law School

Located on the left and right wings of the library, it is the embodiment of "wen zuo wu yi" in traditional Chinese culture. It means harmony between literature and martial arts, and literary and martial arts. The two courtyards stand opposite each other, and are a pair of sister buildings. The plane is a square courtyard, the facade has 4 floors, and the palace-style roof. The College of Arts was completed in September 1931. It was the office of the presidents of the National Wuhan University; the Law School was completed in August 1936. The roof of the College of Arts adopts a warped corner, which means literary talent; the roof of the Law School is a flat angle, which means the seriousness of magic power. There is a "fairy riding a chicken" on the eaves, and seven ridge beasts stand behind, which means to suppress fire and eliminate evil people.

However, some people have refuted the above explanation. According to the original design of Caiers, the corners of all Chinese roofs of Wuhan University are relatively flat in the northern style. However, the Hanxiesheng Construction Company, which undertook the construction of the first phase of the new campus at Luojia Mountain, did not strictly follow the drawings. Instead, it made the corners of the three pavilions on top of the College of Arts, the student dining hall, and the student dormitory all pointed in the southern style according to the architectural habits of the southern region. This mistake was not discovered in time during construction. At the insistence of Caiers, the corners of the buildings in the second phase of the Luojia Mountain project were all corrected back to the northern style. Therefore, the fundamental reason for the difference in the roof shape of the College of Arts and the Law School is that the construction company did not strictly implement the construction plan, and it was not a far-fetched conclusion that "literature is on the left and military is on the right."

=== Faculty of Science ===
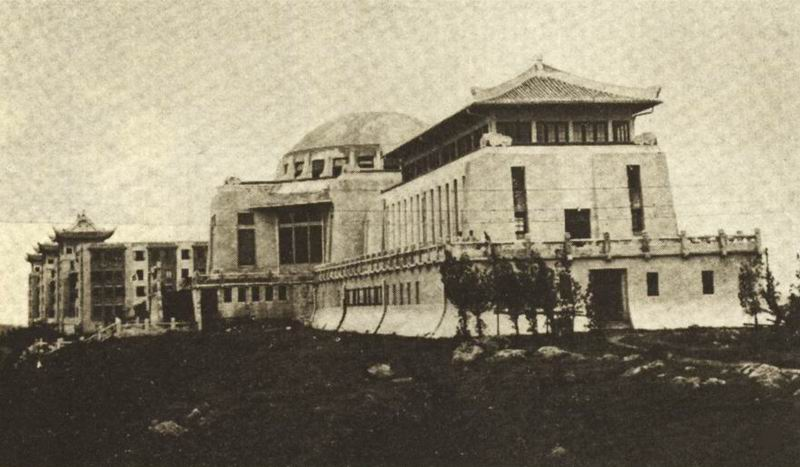

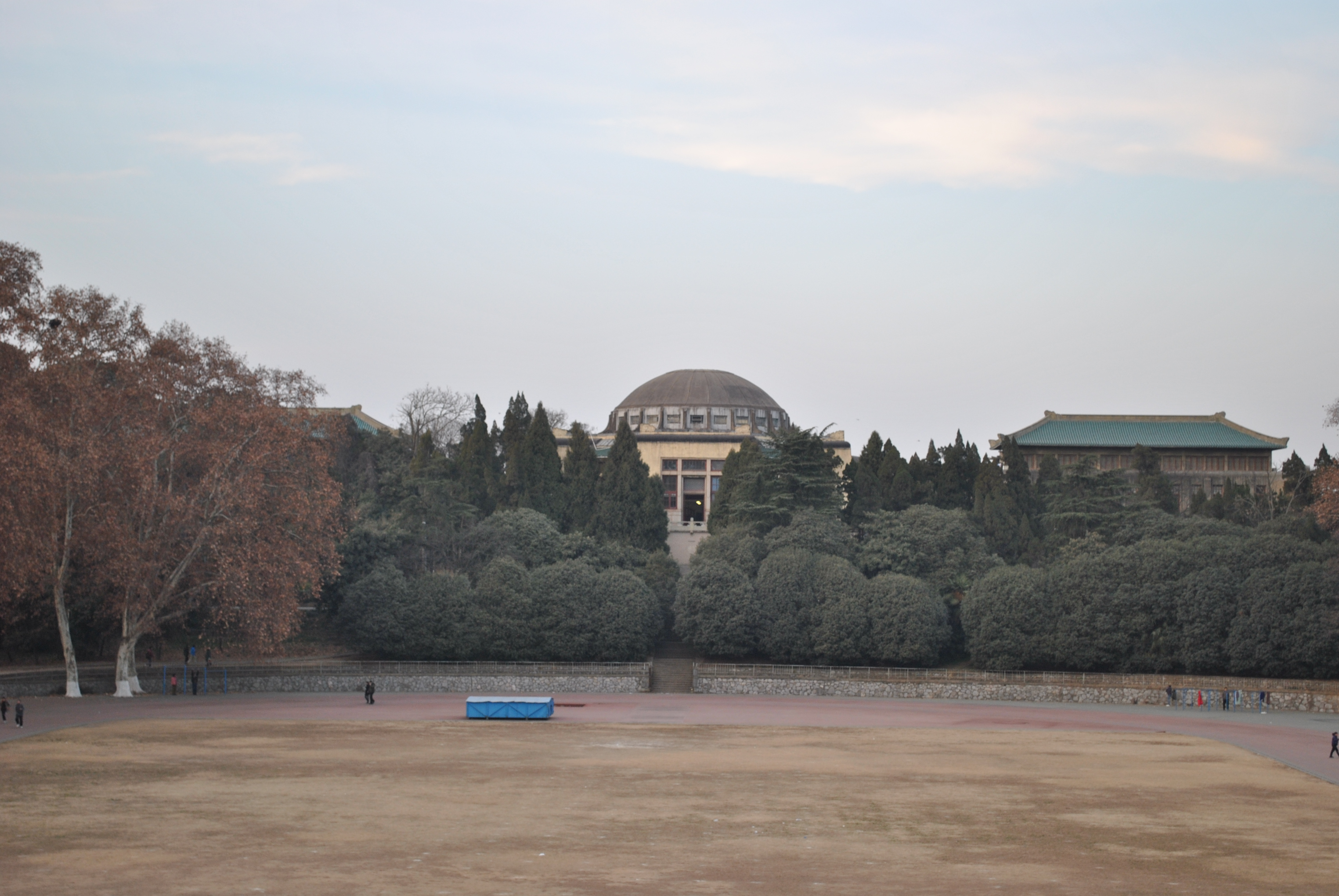

Located on the east side of the male dormitory, the whole building was built in two phases. The main building and the front auxiliary building were the first phase of the project, which was completed in November 1931; the rear auxiliary building was the second phase of the project, which was completed in June 1936. The main building adopts octagonal walls and a Byzantine reinforced concrete dome roof (20 meters in diameter), which echoes the square walls and glass square roof of the Institute of Technology to the south, reflecting the architectural concept of round sky (north) and square earth (south). At the same time, the dome is also to resist the strong wind blowing from the East Lake. The main body in the middle is the Science Hall, with three stepped classrooms on the first floor (also the earliest stepped classrooms in China), classrooms for the School of Science and Engineering on the second floor, and specimen rooms for the Department of Biology and model rooms for the Department of Mathematics on the third floor. The auxiliary buildings on both sides are the Chemistry Building and the Physics Building (Laboratory), which are 4 stories high, single-eaved and hip-and-gable, with green glazed tiles. The hall and the auxiliary buildings are connected by a corridor to form a whole. On October 10, 1948, the Central China Federation of Scientific Societies was held here.

=== College of Science ===
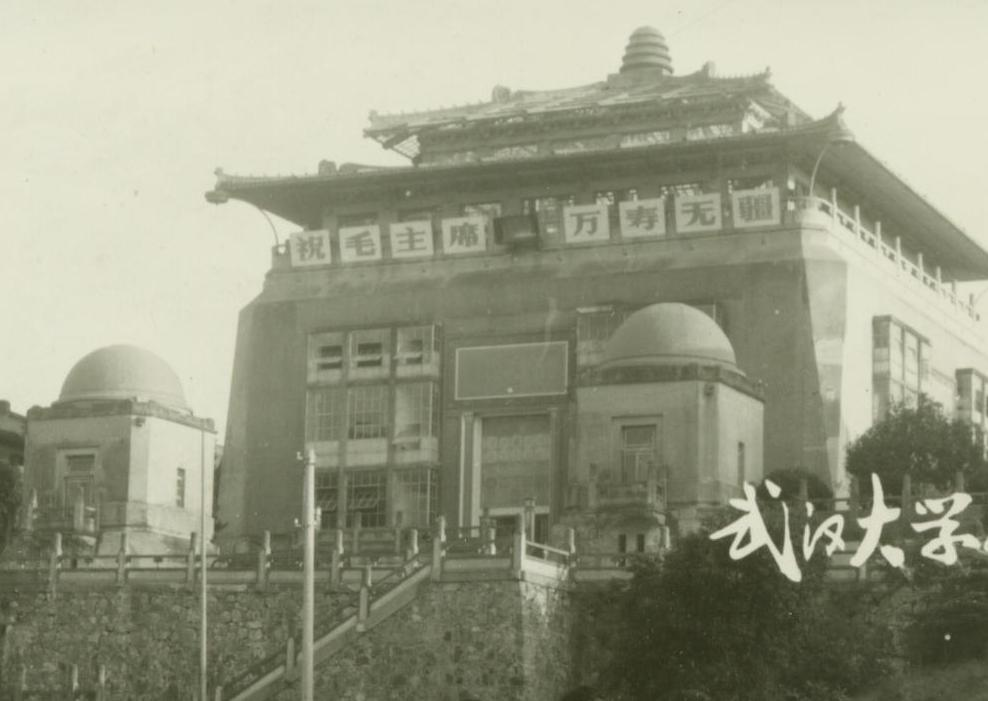

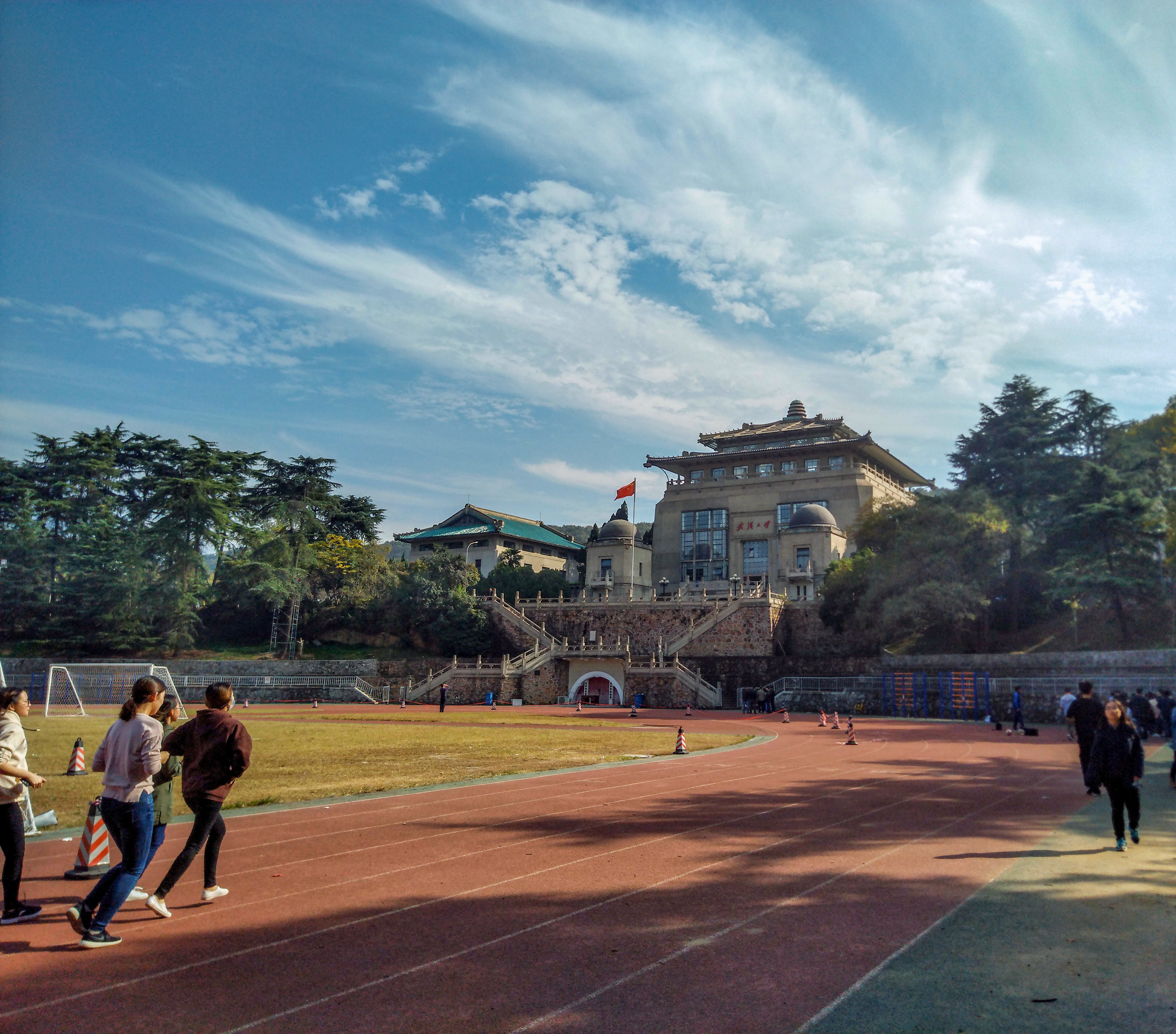

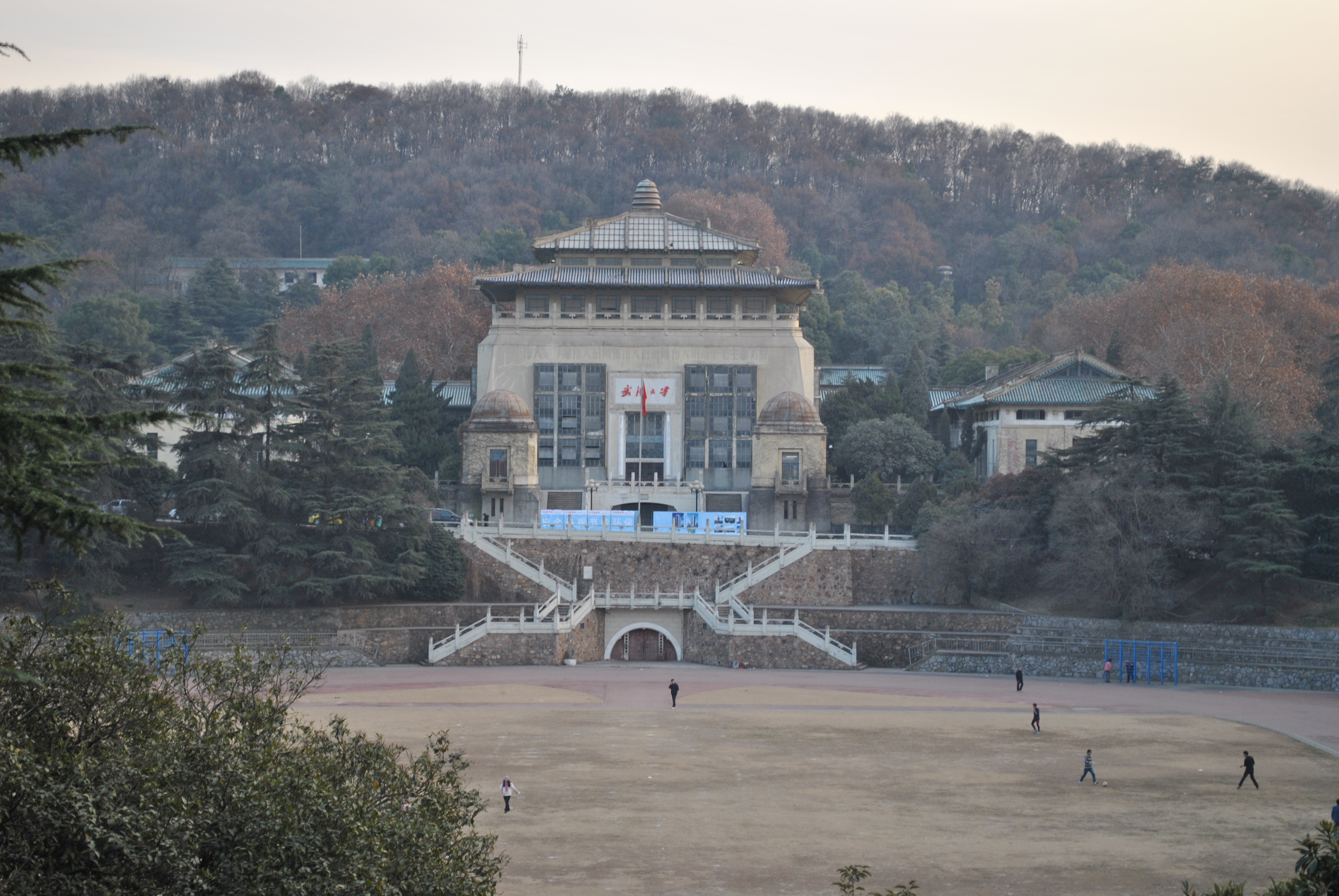

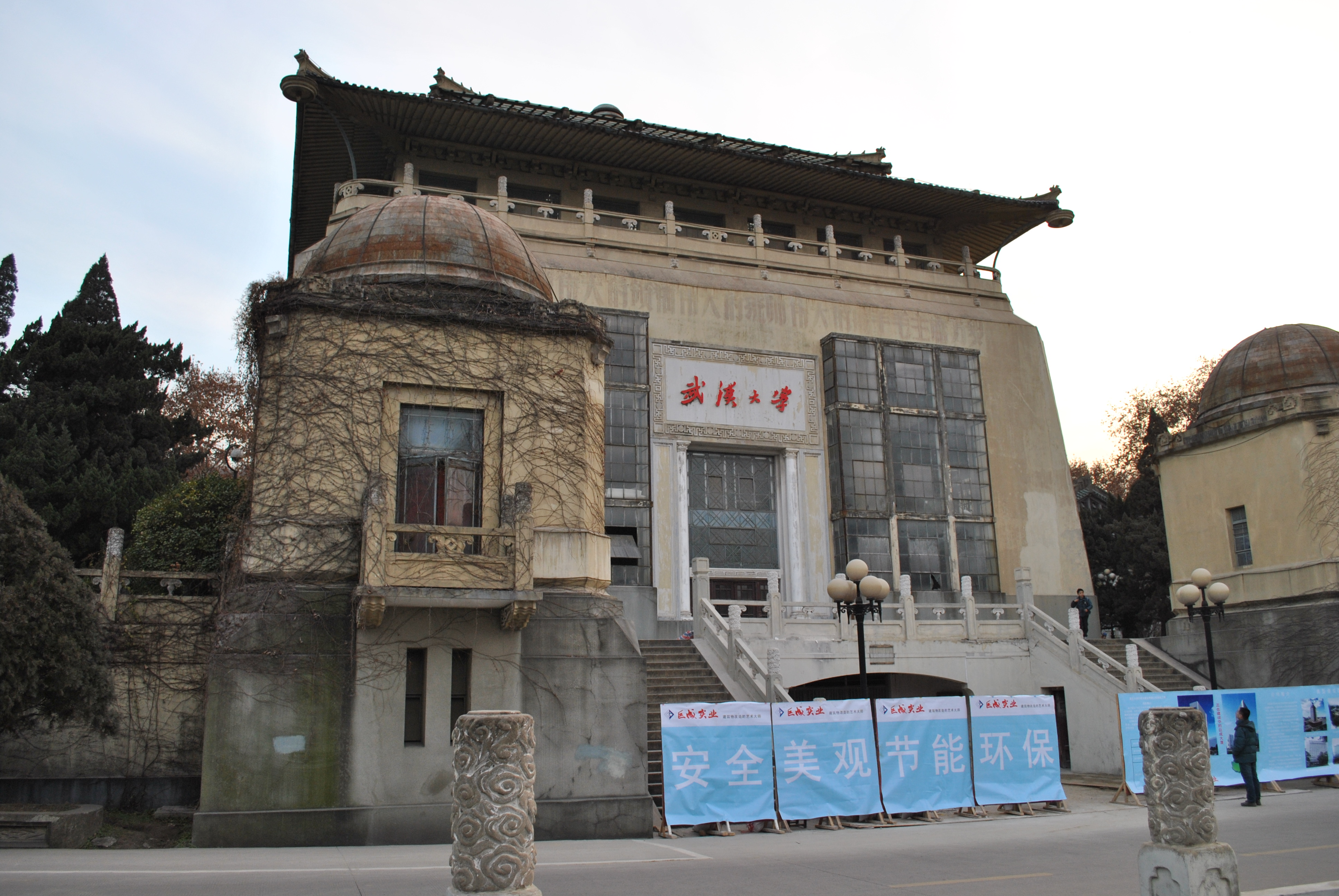

Located just south of the College of Science, it was completed in January 1936. The main building faces south and north, and the four groups of buildings are symmetrically arranged facing the main body. The main building is for teaching purposes, with a square plan. There is a 5-story shared hall in the middle of the building, and four corridors are connected, which is also a public space for students to have activities during class breaks. The basement downstairs is the scientific and technological achievement hall, which can be entered and exited from the passage under the high platform in front of the building, and sunlight can directly shine into the hall from the top. The four buildings are used for the offices of the departments of civil engineering, mechanical engineering, electrical engineering, mining and metallurgy, as well as research institutes and laboratories. They are all rectangular in plan, with inner corridors, single-eaved hip-and-gable style, and green glazed tiles. The square wall of the main building has obvious side angles. This is because the wall surface of the traditional Chinese city wall is inclined. In order to make the architectural style meet the requirements of the traditional form, the method of beveling the four corners of the wall was adopted, using people's visual errors to create the illusion of an inclined wall, so that this modern building also has the charm of traditional Chinese architecture. The pointed four-cornered double-eaved glass roof and the shared-space glass atrium structure are one of the earliest buildings in the world to adopt the architectural trend of space sharing. Together with the four traditional Chinese auxiliary buildings on the periphery and the two Roman-style towers in front, it is a typical Chinese-Western fusion building. The disc-shaped water buckets on the four corners not only solve the drainage problem of the large roof, but also become decorations to beautify the building; the lion-faced beast decorations are rare in traditional Chinese architecture and are unique. It is now the administrative building of Wuhan University.

=== Central China Hydraulic Engineering Laboratory ===
Located just south of the College of Science, it was completed in January 1936. The main building faces south and north, and the four groups of buildings are symmetrically arranged facing the main body. The main building is for teaching purposes, with a square plan. There is a 5-story shared hall in the middle of the building, and four corridors are connected, which is also a public space for students to have activities during class breaks. The basement downstairs is the scientific and technological achievement hall, which can be entered and exited from the passage under the high platform in front of the building, and sunlight can directly shine into the hall from the top. The four buildings are used for the offices of the departments of civil engineering, mechanical engineering, electrical engineering, mining and metallurgy, as well as research institutes and laboratories. They are all rectangular in plan, with inner corridors, single-eaved hip-and-gable style, and green glazed tiles. The square wall of the main building has obvious side angles. This is because the wall surface of the traditional Chinese city wall is inclined. In order to make the architectural style meet the requirements of the traditional form, the method of beveling the four corners of the wall was adopted, using people's visual errors to create the illusion of an inclined wall, so that this modern building also has the charm of traditional Chinese architecture. The pointed four-cornered double-eaved glass roof and the shared-space glass atrium structure are one of the earliest buildings in the world to adopt the architectural trend of space sharing. Together with the four traditional Chinese auxiliary buildings on the periphery and the two Roman-style towers in front, it is a typical Chinese-Western fusion building. The disc-shaped water buckets on the four corners not only solve the drainage problem of the large roof, but also become decorations to beautify the building; the lion-faced beast decorations are rare in traditional Chinese architecture and are unique. It is now the administrative building of Wuhan University.

=== Hillside Residence ===
Located at the northern foot of Luojia Mountain, it was built in 1936 by the Hubei Provincial Government and the National Wuhan University. The building has a glazed roof with a hip roof, curved steel beams as the roof frame, and a circular waterway on the ground. During the Anti-Japanese War, the scientific research base, which had just been completed for two years, turned into a stable for the Japanese army.

=== eighteen buildings ===
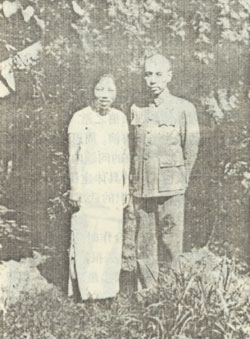
Zhou Enlai and Deng Yingchao at Wuhan University

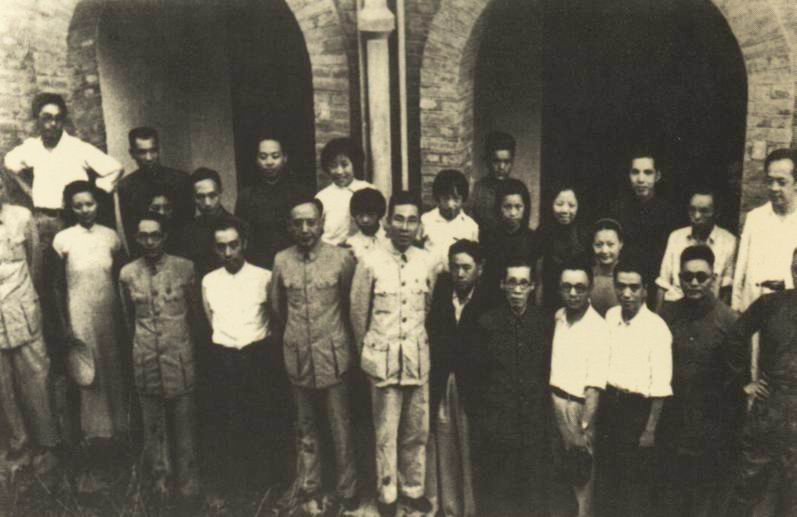
Group photo in front of Guo Moruo's former residence

Located in the southeast of Luojia Mountain, the first faculty and staff residential area was built in September 1931 with 18 buildings in the first phase, and 3 buildings were added in 1933. During the Anti-Japanese War, one building was demolished by the Japanese invaders, and another building was added in 1947. Since then, two buildings have been destroyed one after another. There are actually 19 buildings in total. The overall architectural style adopts the English country villa style, with 2-3-story brick and wood structure. At the same time, each building has its own characteristics. It was mainly designed by Shi Ges and Shen Zhongqing and built by Han Xiesheng Construction Factory. After the Japanese army occupied Wuhan, they changed the internal structure of some villas into Japanese style. The former residences of Zhou Enlai and Guo Moruo, which are national key cultural relics protection units, are among them (No. 27, Building 19 and No. 20, Building 12, Area 1, respectively). The former residence of Zhou Enlai is a standard English pastoral villa with red tiles and blue bricks, a wide foundation, surrounded by towering trees in front and behind the house, and several stone steps leading to the foot of the mountain. The villa is separated by two Gothic-style arched gates. There is an exquisite garden between the buildings, with a large banana tree planted. During the Wuhan Battle, due to the second cooperation between the Kuomintang and the Communist Party, the National Government arranged for Zhou Enlai and Deng Yingchao to stay here. The two often went for a walk by the East Lake. When Deng Yingchao was alive, someone suggested that this place be built into a memorial hall, but she rejected it. Adjacent to Zhou Enlai's former residence is the former residence of Huang Qixiang, who was also the deputy director of the Political Department. Guo Moruo revisited the place in 1961 and took a photo in front of his former residence. He also mentioned this experience in his anti-Japanese war memoir "Hongbo Qu", saying that "the Wuhan University area outside Wuchang City should be regarded as a paradise outside the three towns of Wuhan". In addition, there is Su Xuelin's former residence, hidden between an old vine and the arms of an ancient tree that winds up and hangs in the air. Yang Duanliu, Xiong Guozao, Ge Yanghuan, Liu Boping, Gui Zhiting and others have lived here. After the founding of the People's Republic of China, most professors were forced to move out and were replaced by lecturers and teaching assistants. After the Cultural Revolution began, the old professors were driven back and had to live together in crowded places. Many died unjustly during this period. Zhang Yuntai and Cheng Qianfan even lived in a place called "three households do not make a village" in District 9. After the Cultural Revolution, most old professors moved out on their own initiative. Some buildings are still inhabited, and some are used by the Wuhan University Design and Research Institute or other colleges and departments.

=== Former Residence of Li Da ===
Located in the western part of the southern foot of Luojia Mountain, it is a brick-and-wood structure bungalow surrounded by a courtyard wall and built in 1952. The floor plan is in the shape of the Chinese character "干", which was drawn by Li Da himself and then designed by engineers.

== Other early buildings ==
In addition to the aforementioned early buildings that have been listed as national key cultural relics protection units, there are several old buildings built in the same period on the Wuhan University campus. Some of them have been demolished due to historical reasons or lack of protection. Relevant parties are working hard to include the remaining early buildings of great value and well-preserved into national key cultural relics protection units.

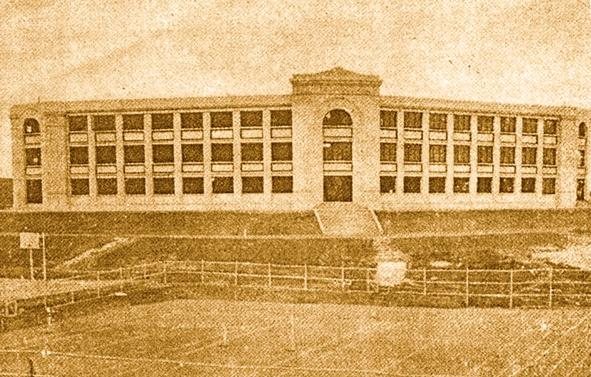
Girls dormitory

=== Girls dormitory ===
Located in Tuanshan, south of Lion Rock, the female dormitory is also called "Butterfly Palace" or "Moon Palace" because of its appearance. Completed in 1932, it is a three-story reinforced concrete frame structure designed by Shi Gesi and built by Yongmaolong Construction Factory. The building's facade is decorated in a simple and elegant manner, and the round arch decoration at the main entrance echoes the male dormitory.

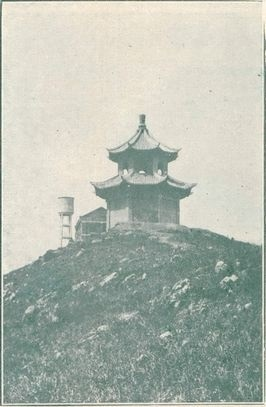
Wuhan University Luojiashan Water Tower

=== Luojiashan Water Tower ===
Also known as the Octagonal Pavilion, it is located northwest of Building 18 on Luojia Mountain and was completed in September 1931. It is a two-story, eight-sided building with a reinforced concrete structure, a green glazed tile spire, and a tower height of 16.5 meters. It was designed by Shi Ges and built by Han Xiesheng Construction Factory. The water tower is one of the earliest tap water supply equipment in Wuchang. It consists of three parts: a pumping tower, a sedimentation tank, and a filtration tower. Only the pumping tower remains. The lower level of the water tower is a pool, which can store 400 tons of domestic water in those days, with an average daily water supply of 700-1000 tons; the upper level is a sightseeing loft. Han Xiesheng originally decided to donate the water tower to Wuhan University, but because it suffered heavy losses in the first phase of the new campus project, the school still paid the construction fee in full.

=== College of Agriculture ===
The main building was started in 1937, but construction was suspended due to the outbreak of the Anti-Japanese War and completed in 1947 after demobilization. It is a three-story building with a four-story middle part and a reinforced concrete frame structure. It was designed by Shen Zhongqing and built by Yuan Ruitai Construction Factory. The annex is a two-story building with a hip roof, located on the southwest side of the main building. During the adjustment of colleges and departments, the building became the administrative building of Wuhan Hydraulic Institute. It is now the office building of the Youth League Committee and the Department of Student Affairs of Wuhan University. There is a famous sign "Jacob Building" at the main entrance. On November 23, 2012, the building was listed in the seventh batch of excellent historical buildings in Wuhan.

=== September 12 Sports Stadium ===
It was built in 1928, covering an area of 20,000 square meters. It was named after Mao Zedong met with teachers and students from Wuhan University and four other universities here on September 12, 1958.

=== Private Wuchang Donghu Middle School Building ===
Also known as the Boxer Rebellion Martyrs Memorial Hall, it is located in the old building of Wuhan University Attached Primary School at the southern foot of Luojia Mountain. It was built in 1935. It is a two-story brick and wood structure with white walls and red tiles. The plane is in the shape of a "丁". It was donated to Wuhan University Attached Middle School(Donghu Middle School) by the Construction Committee of the Boxer Rebellion Martyrs' Tomb with the remaining funds from the tomb repair. This building has "a large auditorium, a large library specimen room, four offices, and six classrooms, which are enough for school offices and 300 students to read books and take classes". In March 1938, the National Government held a wartime officer training class here.

=== Luojia Stone House ===
This is the first house built by Wuhan University on Luojia Mountain (before that, the only buildings on Luojia Mountain were Tongyun Pavilion on the southwest slope and Liu's Manor on the north slope). It was built in 1929 with a construction area of 192 square meters. In order to survey and supervise the construction of the new campus of Wuhan University, Miao Enzhao, Shen Zhongqing and others took stones from the mountain to build the stone house, which became the office space of the Infrastructure Department. After the completion of the first phase of the project, Ren Kainan and Li Jiannong moved in, so the stone house was also nicknamed "Ren Li Ergong Temple". It was demolished in the early 1970s, and a three-story guesthouse was built on its original site. Later, it was converted into an office building for the Graduate School.

=== Tingsonglu ===
Tingsonglu is a two-story Western-style building built by Wuhan University in the pine forest of the manor of Guangdong businessman Liu Yanshi on the north slope of Luojia Mountain after his manor was expropriated. It was named "Tingsonglu" for this reason. It was designed by Miao Enzhao and Shen Zhongqing and completed in September 1930, with a construction area of 360 square meters. It was used as the "Architecture Committee Office", "Architecture Equipment Committee Club" and "Reception Room" and received important figures such as Hu Shi, Chen Cheng, Wang Shijie, Chiang Kai-shek and Song Meiling in the 1930s. However, during the fall of Wuhan, Tingsonglu was demolished by the Japanese army. In the early 1990s, Wuhan University built "Luojia Villa" on the site of Tingsonglu.

=== The Second Faculty and Staff Residential Complex ===
The last four buildings were demolished in May 2006 to expand the main library of Wuhan University.
