= Wang Xi (politician) =

Chinese scientist and politician

- 王曦
- Wang in 2026

Head of the United Front Work Department of the Guangdong Provincial Committee of the Chinese Communist Party
- Incumbent
- Assumed office July 2024
- Party Secretary: Huang Kunming
- Preceded by: Wang Ruijun

Vice Governor of Guangdong
- In office August 2020 – November 2024
- Governor: Ma Xingrui→Wang Weizhong

Personal details
- Born: August 1966 (age 60) Shanghai, China
- Party: Chinese Communist Party
- Education: Tsinghua University
- Scientific career
- Fields: Materials science
- Workplaces: Shanghai Institute of Metallurgy, Chinese Academy of Sciences (1994–2001); Shanghai Institute of Microsystems and Information Technology, Chinese Academy of Sciences (2001–2019)

Wang Xi (Chinese: 王曦; pinyin: Wáng Xī; born August 1966) is a Chinese materials scientist and politician who is an academician of the Chinese Academy of Sciences, and currently standing member and the head of the united front work department of the Guangdong Provincial Committee of the Chinese Communist Party.

He was an alternate of the 19th Central Committee of the Chinese Communist Party and is a member of the 20th Central Committee of the Chinese Communist Party.

== Early life and education ==
Wang was born in Shanghai, in August 1966, while his ancestral home in Nantong, Jiangsu. He attended the Nantong Middle School of Jiangsu Province. In 1987, he graduated from the Department of Engineering Physics, Tsinghua University. He went on to receive his master's degree in 1990 and doctor's degree in 1993 from the Shanghai Institute of Metallurgy, Chinese Academy of Sciences (CAS), all in material physics.

== Academic career ==
After graduating in 1994, he stayed and worked at the Shanghai Institute of Metallurgy, Chinese Academy of Sciences, where he was promoted to deputy director of the Third Research Office in 1996 and director of the Third Research Office in 1998. He then continued working in the newly restructured Shanghai Institute of Microsystems and Information Technology, where he moved up the ranks to become deputy president in 2004 and president in 2010. In December 2009, he was unanimously chosen as an academician of the Chinese Academy of Sciences, becoming the youngest member of the Chinese Academy of Sciences in 2009. He served a short term as vice chairman of the China Association for Science and Technology from June 2016 to May 2017. He also served as president of the CAS's Shanghai Institute of Advanced Research from April 2017 to May 2019. He was a visiting scholar at the Australian Commonwealth Institute of Science and Industry between July 1993 and May 1994 and the Rosendorf Research Center, Germany between May 1996 and June 1998.

== Political career ==
Wang joined the Chinese Communist Party (CCP) in April 2001. He began his political career in May 2019, when he was appointed vice minister of the Science and Technology.

Wang was chosen as vice governor of Guangdong in August 2020 and in May 2022 he was admitted as member of the Standing Committee of the CCP Guangdong Provincial Committee, the province's top authority. In July 2024, Wang was appointed as the head of the united front work department of the CCP Guangdong Provincial Committee.

== Honours and awards ==
- 2006 State Science and Technology Progress Award (First Class) for the research and industrialization of high-end silicon based SOI materials
- 2008 Science and Technology Progress Award of the Ho Leung Ho Lee Foundation
- December 2009 Member of the Chinese Academy of Sciences (CAS)

Academic offices
Preceded by Feng Songlin	President of the Shanghai Institute of Microsystems and Information Technology; 2010–2019	Succeeded by Xie Xiaoming
Preceded by Feng Songlin	President of Shanghai Institute of Advanced Research; 2017–2019	Succeeded by Li Ruxin
Party political offices
Preceded by Wang Ruijun	Head of the United front Work Department of the Guangdong Provincial Committee of the Chinese Communist Party; 2024–	Incumbent
