= Shi Jintong =

Chinese politician (born 1979)

- 施金通

Deputy Townhead of Shuanglong Town
- Incumbent
- Assumed office May 2017
- Townhead: Wang Benjian (王本建)

Personal details
- Born: May 1979 (age 46) Huayuan County, Hunan, China
- Party: Chinese Communist Party

Shi Jintong (Chinese: 施金通; pinyin: Shī Jīntōng; born May 1979) is a Chinese politician of Miao ethnicity, currently serving as deputy townhead of Shuanglong Town and party secretary of Shibadong Village.

He is a representative of the 20th National Congress of the Chinese Communist Party and an alternate of the 20th Central Committee of the Chinese Communist Party.

== Biography ==
A native of the Shibadong Village of Shuanglong Town in Huayuan County, Hunan, Shi joined the Chinese Communist Party (CCP) in June 2001, and was proposed as director of his home-village in August 2005 and rose to become deputy townhead of his home-town in May 2017.

Shi is a supporter of Xi Jinping, general secretary of the CCP Central Committee, who inspected the village to propose the policy of "Targeted Poverty Alleviation" for the first time. Shibadong Village became a testing ground for the new initiative in since Xi's investigation.
