= Soinam Dainzin =

Governor of Yushu Prefecture (born 1971)

- བསོད་ནམས་བསྟན་འཛིན

Governor of Yushu Tibetan Autonomous Prefecture
- Incumbent
- Assumed office 26 April 2021
- Preceded by: Cêringtar

Personal details
- Born: September 1971 (age 55) Guide County, Qinghai, China
- Party: Chinese Communist Party
- Education: Hainan Tibetan Autonomous Prefecture Ethnic Normal School; Central Party School of the Chinese Communist Party

Soinam Dainzin (Tibetan: བསོད་ནམས་བསྟན་འཛིན, Wylie: bsod nams bstan vdzin, Chinese: 索南丹增; born September 1971) is a Chinese politician of Tibetan ethnicity, currently serving as governor of Yushu Tibetan Autonomous Prefecture.

== Early life and education ==
Soinam Dainzin was born in Guide County, Qinghai, in September 1971, and graduated from Hainan Tibetan Autonomous Prefecture Ethnic Normal School in 1989.

== Political career ==
Soinam Dainzin joined the Chinese Communist Party (CCP) in April 1993.

He worked in Hainan Tibetan Autonomous Prefectural Committee of the Communist Youth League of China from 1989 to 1998 and Haibei Tibetan Autonomous Prefectural People's Government from 1998 to 2001. In May 2001, he became deputy magistrate of Qilian County, a post he kept until August 2006. In August 2006, he became deputy head of the Organization Department of the CCP Haibei Tibetan Autonomous Prefectural Committee, rising to executive deputy head the next year. He served as deputy deputy secretary-general of the CCP Haibei Tibetan Autonomous Prefectural Committee in August 2009, and two years later promoted to the secretary-general position. In October 2011, he was admitted to member of the Standing Committee of the CCP Haibei Tibetan Autonomous Prefectural Committee, the prefecture's top authority. He became secretary of the Political and Legal Affairs Commission of the CCP Haibei Tibetan Autonomous Prefectural Committee in October 2016, and served until August 2017. In May 2017, he became a member of the Standing Committee of Qinghai Provincial Commission for Discipline Inspection, and was appointed secretary-general three months later. He was chosen as deputy party secretary of Yushu Tibetan Autonomous Prefecture in January 2021, concurrently serving as governor since April 26.

Government offices
| Preceded by Cêringtar | Governor of Yushu Tibetan Autonomous Prefecture; 2021– | Incumbent |
