= Sun Xiangdong =

- 孙向东

Deputy Commander of the Central Theater Command
- Incumbent
- Assumed office November 2024
- Preceded by: Li Zhizhong

Leader of 95829 Airborne Troop of the People's Liberation Army
- In office 2019 – November 2024
- Preceded by: Liu Faqing
- Succeeded by: Wen Dong

Personal details
- Born: September 1968 (age 57) Anlu County, Hubei, China
- Party: Chinese Communist Party

Military service
- Allegiance: People's Republic of China
- Branch/service: People's Liberation Army Air Force
- Years of service: ?-present
- Rank: Lieutenant general
- Unit: People's Liberation Air Force Airborne Corps Central Theater Command

Chinese name
- Simplified Chinese: 孙向东
- Traditional Chinese: 孫向東
Transcriptions
Standard Mandarin
- Hanyu Pinyin: Sūn Xiàngdōng

Sun Xiangdong (Chinese: 孙向东;born September 1968) is a lieutenant general in the People's Liberation Army of China. He currently serves as a deputy commander of the Central Theater Command.

He is a representative of the 20th National Congress of the Chinese Communist Party and an alternate of the 20th Central Committee of the Chinese Communist Party.

== Biography ==
A native of Anlu County, Hubei, Sun served in the Airborne Troop of the People's Liberation Army for a long time. In 2019, he was appointed leader of 95829 Airborne Troop of the People's Liberation Army. In November 2024 Sun Xiangdong was replaced by Wen Dong as the Leader of the Airborne Corps under the codename (95829). In November 2024 he got promoted to the rank of Lieutenant General and became the deputy commander of the Central Theater Command.
