= Tang Guangfu =

Chinese engineer

- 汤广福
- Born: 9 August 1966 (age 60); Chu County, Anhui, China
- Education: Xi'an Jiaotong University
- Scientific career
- Fields: Power electronic technology
- Workplaces: State Grid Smart Grid Research Institute

Chinese name
- Simplified Chinese: 汤广福
- Traditional Chinese: 湯廣福
Transcriptions
Standard Mandarin
- Hanyu Pinyin: Tāng Guǎngfú

Tang Guangfu (born 9 August 1966) is a Chinese engineer who is vice president of State Grid Smart Grid Research Institute, and an academician of the Chinese Academy of Engineering.

== Biography ==
Tang was born in Chu County, Anhui, on 9 August 1966. He secondary studied at Chuzhou High School. In 1986, he enrolled at Xi'an Jiaotong University, graduating in 1990 with a Bachelor of Engineering degree. He went on to receive his master's and doctor's degrees from the Institute of Plasma Physics, Chinese Academy of Sciences, all in nuclear fusion and plasma physics.

He was appointed an engineer of China Electric Power Research Institute, in 1996, and moved up the ranks to become president in 2006. In 2012, he became director of State Grid Smart Grid Research Institute, and vice president in 2016.

== Honours and awards ==
- 2006 State Science and Technology Progress Award (Second Class)
- 2008 State Science and Technology Progress Award (First Class)
- 2012 Guanghua Engineering Technology Award
- 2016 State Technological Invention Award (Second Class)
- 27 November 2017 Member of the Chinese Academy of Engineering (CAE)
