= Xia Linmao =

Chinese politician

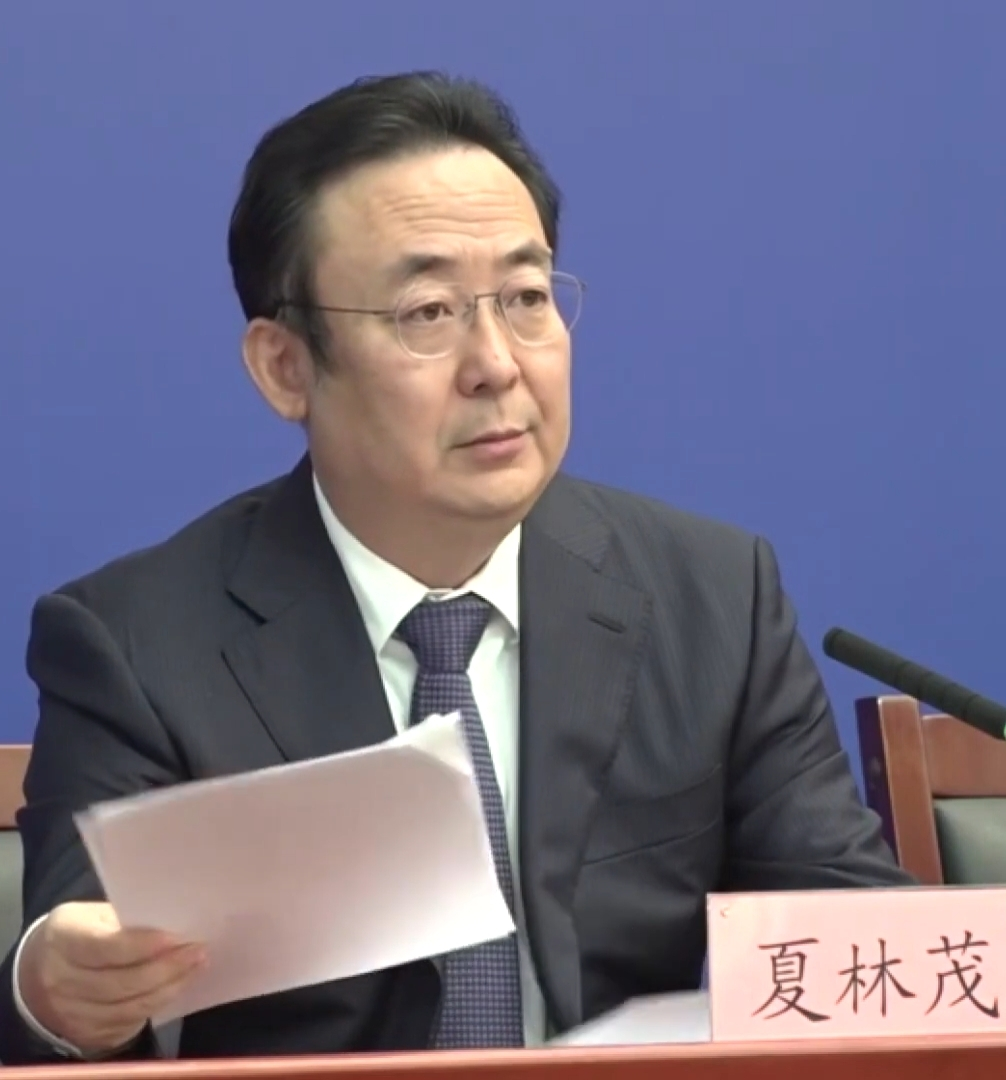
Xia Linmao in 2023

Xia Linmao (born in May 1970, Chinese: 夏林茂), a native of Jianhu, Jiangsu, and is a politician in the People's Republic of China.

== Career ==
Xia Linmao joined in the Chinese Communist Party (CCP) in November 1997. In 2008, he held the position of deputy director at the Beijing Municipal Planning Commission. In 2010, held the position of deputy director of the General Office of the Beijing Municipal Committee of the CCP and director of the Municipal Party Committee's Supervision and Investigation Office. In 2011, held the position of deputy secretary of the Beijing Municipal Committee for the Shijingshan District, as well as serving as deputy mayor and mayor of the District Government. In 2017, held the position of secretary of the Beijing Miyun District Committee of the CCP. In 2019, held the position of secretary of Beijing Dongcheng. In 2021, he assumed the roles of secretary of the Standing Committee of the Beijing Municipal Committee of the CCP, secretary of the Education Work Committee, and secretary of the Dongcheng District Committee. In 2023, he was appointed to the Standing Committee of the CCP Beijing Municipal Committee, and assumed the role of vice mayor of Beijing.

== Investigation ==
On 22 October 2026, Xia was put under investigation for alleged "serious violations of discipline and laws" by the Central Commission for Discipline Inspection (CCDI), the party's internal disciplinary body, and the National Supervisory Commission, the highest anti-corruption agency of China.
