= Liu Zhonghua (agronomist) =

Chinese agronomist

- Born: March 1965 (age 61); Hengyang, Hunan, China
- Education: Hunan Agricultural University; Tsinghua University
- Scientific career
- Fields: Tea science
- Workplaces: Hunan Agricultural University

Chinese name
- Traditional Chinese: 劉仲華
- Simplified Chinese: 刘仲华
Transcriptions
Standard Mandarin
- Hanyu Pinyin: Liú Zhònghuá

Liu Zhonghua (Chinese: 刘仲华; born March 1965) is a Chinese agronomist and professor and doctoral supervisor at Hunan Agricultural University.

== Biography ==
Liu was born in Hengyang, Hunan, in March 1965. He earned his bachelor's degree and master's degree at Hunan Agricultural University under the direction of Shi Zhaopeng (施兆鹏). In July 2014 he received his doctor's degree from Tsinghua University.

After graduating from Hunan Agricultural University, he taught there, where he was promoted to associate professor in 1992 and to full professor in 1999.

== Honours and awards ==
- November 22, 2019 Member of the Chinese Academy of Engineering (CAE)
