= Li Shisong =

Chinese politician

- 李石松

Executive Vice Governor of Yunnan
- In office January 2024 – June 2024
- Governor: Wang Yubo

Personal details
- Born: February 1969 (age 57) Yunlong County, Yunnan, China
- Party: Chinese Communist Party (expelled in 2024)
- Education: Yunnan University; University of Electronic Science and Technology of China

Li Shisong (Chinese: 李石松; pinyin: Lǐ Shísōng; born February 1969) is a former Chinese politician of Bai ethnicity who spent his entire career in southwest China's Yunnan province. He served as executive vice governor of Yunnan in 2024.

Li was also a representative of the 20th National Congress of the Chinese Communist Party and an alternate of the 20th Central Committee of the Chinese Communist Party.

Bai was investigated by China's top anti-graft agency in June 2024, dismissed from public office in December 2024, and arrested in January 2025.

== Early life and education ==
Li was born in Yunlong County, Yunnan, in February 1969. In 1986, he entered Yunnan University, where he majored in ethnology. He did his postgraduate work at the University of Electronic Science and Technology of China between 2005 and 2008.

== Career ==
After graduation in 1990, Li was assigned as an official to Yunnan Provincial Ethnic Affairs Commission.

Li was transferred to the General Office of Yunnan Provincial People's Government in August 1998 and finally became deputy secretary-general in April 2013.

Li was appointed executive vice governor of Honghe Hani and Yi Autonomous Prefecture in May 2016 and was admitted to member of the CCP Honghe Hani and Yi Autonomous Prefectural Committee, the prefecture's top authority.

Li was director of Yunnan Provincial Industry and Information Technology Department in February 2018, concurrently serving as director of Yunnan Provincial Small and Medium Enterprises Bureau.

In January 2019, Li was named acting mayor of Qujing, confirmed in the following month. He was elevated to party secretary, the top political position in the city, in December 2021.

In December 2023, Li was admitted to member of the CCP Yunnan Provincial Committee, the province's top authority, and appointed executive vice governor of Yunnan.

== Downfall ==
On 25 June 2024, Li was put under investigation for alleged "serious violations of discipline and laws" by the Central Commission for Discipline Inspection (CCDI), the party's internal disciplinary body, and the National Supervisory Commission, the highest anti-corruption agency of China.

In December 2024, Li was removed from public office and expelled from the CCP. On January 3, 2025, the Supreme People's Procuratorate announced that Li had been arrested for allegedly taking bribes and that the case had been handed over to prosecutors.

Government offices
Preceded by Yang Fusheng	Director of Yunnan Provincial Industry and Information Technology Department; 2018–2019	Succeeded by Zhao Yongping
Preceded by Dong Baotong	Mayor of Qujing; 2019–2022	Succeeded by Li Xianxiang
Party political offices
Preceded by Li Wenrong	Communist Party Secretary of Qujing; 2021–2023	Succeeded by Yang Bin
