= Zhou Zhixin =

Chinese scientist (born 1965)

- 周志鑫

President of the Space Engineering University
- Incumbent
- Assumed office 2017
- Preceded by: New title

Personal details
- Born: August 1965 (age 61) Taihu County, Anhui, China
- Party: Chinese Communist Party
- Education: Harbin Institute of Technology; PLA Institute of Electronic Engineering
- Scientific career
- Fields: Space remote sensing applications

Zhou Zhixin (Chinese: 周志鑫; pinyin: Zhōu Zhìxīn; born August 1965) is a Chinese scientist and university administrator, an academician of the Chinese Academy of Sciences, and currently president of the Space Engineering University.

He is an alternate of the 20th Central Committee of the Chinese Communist Party.

== Biography ==
Zhou was born in Taihu County, Anhui, in August 1965. He attended Taihu High School. He graduated from the PLA Institute of Electronic Engineering before gaining a master's degree and a doctor's degree from the Harbin Institute of Technology.

Zhou became a researcher at the Beijing Institute of Remote Sensing Information in 1999, and finally becoming its director.

In November 2017, Zhou was appointed president of the newly founded Space Engineering University.

== Honours and awards ==
- 2008 State Technological Invention Award (Second Class)
- 2008 State Science and Technology Progress Award (First Class) for the space information direct support application test system
- 2009 Science and Technology Innovation Award of Ho Leung Ho Lee Foundation
- 2014 State Science and Technology Progress Award (SSpecial)
- 7 December 2015 Member of the Chinese Academy of Sciences (CAS)

Educational offices
New title	President of the Space Engineering University; 2017–	Incumbent
