= Cêringtar =

Chinese politician

- ཚེ་རིང་ཐར།

Vice Governor of Qinghai
- Incumbent
- Assumed office February 2021
- Governor: Wu Xiaojun

Personal details
- Born: August 1968 (age 58) Haidong, Qinghai, China
- Party: Chinese Communist Party
- Education: Ping'an County Normal School; Harbin Institute of Technology; Qinghai Normal University

Chinese name
- Simplified Chinese: 才让太
- Traditional Chinese: 才讓太
Transcriptions
Standard Mandarin
- Hanyu Pinyin: Cáiràngtài

Cêringtar (Tibetan: ཚེ་རིང་ཐར།, Wylie: tshe ring thar, ZWPY: Cêringtar; Chinese: 才让太; born August 1968) is a Chinese politician of Tibetan ethnicity who is the current vice governor of Qinghai, in office since February 2021.

He is a representative of the 20th National Congress of the Chinese Communist Party and an alternate of the 20th Central Committee of the Chinese Communist Party.

== Early life and education ==
A native of Haidong, Qinghai, Cêringtar graduated from Ping'an County Normal School in 1987.

== Political career ==
Cêringtar joined the Chinese Communist Party (CCP) in October 1991. He taught at school before serving in various administrative and political roles in Guinan County. He served as deputy secretary of the Hainan Tibetan Autonomous Prefectural Committee of the Communist Youth League of China in April 2000, and seven months later promoted to the secretary position. He was appointed deputy party secretary of Guinan County in January 2002, concurrently serving as secretary of the Guinan County Commission for Discipline Inspection, the party's agency in charge of anti-corruption efforts. He subsequently had briefly served as deputy secretary-general and office director of Hainan Tibetan Autonomous Prefecture. He was magistrate of Guinan County in September 2006 and subsequently party secretary of Guide County in September 2008. In October 2011, he became vice governor of Yushu Tibetan Autonomous Prefecture, rising to governor in January 2015. He was appointed vice governor of Qinghai in January 2021 and a year later was admitted to member of the Standing Committee of the CCP Qinghai Provincial Committee, the province's top authority.

Government offices
Preceded by Wang Yuhu	Governor of Yushu Tibetan Autonomous Prefecture; 2015–2021	Succeeded by Soinam Dainzin
