= Wei Wenhui =

Chinese military officer (born 1966)

- 魏文徽

Deputy Commander of the Southern Theater Command
- Incumbent
- Assumed office March 2023
- Commander: Wang Xiubin

Personal details
- Born: March 1966 (age 60) Huantai County, Shandong, China
- Party: Chinese Communist Party

Military service
- Allegiance: People's Republic of China
- Branch/service: People's Liberation Army Navy
- Years of service: ?–present
- Rank: Vice admiral (zhongjiang)

Wei Wenhui (Chinese: 魏文徽; pinyin: Wèi Wénhuī; born March 1966) is a pilot and vice admiral in the People's Liberation Army Navy of China.

He was a representative of the 18th National Congress of the Chinese Communist Party and is an alternate of the 20th Central Committee of the Chinese Communist Party.

== Biography ==
Wei was born in China in March 1966. He once served as chief of staff of the Aviation Corps of the East Sea Fleet (now Eastern Theater Command Navy). In March 2023, he rose to become deputy commander of the Southern Theater Command.
