= Li Shucai =

Chinese petrologist

- Born: December 1965 (age 60); Laishui County, Hebei, China
- Education: Shandong University of Science and Technology
- Scientific career
- Fields: Rock mechanics
- Workplaces: Shandong University

Chinese name
- Traditional Chinese: 李術才
- Simplified Chinese: 李术才
Transcriptions
Standard Mandarin
- Hanyu Pinyin: Lǐ Shùcái

Li Shucai (Chinese: 李术才; born December 1965) is a Chinese petrologist who is a professor, doctoral supervisor and vice-president of Shandong University. He is a member of the Chinese Society for Rock Mechanics & Engineering (CSRME). He is one of the Editors-in-Chief for Tunnelling and Underground Space Technology.

== Biography ==
Li was born in Laishui County, Hebei, in December 1965. He enrolled at Shandong Mining Institute (now Shandong University of Science and Technology) where he received his B.Eng. degree in 1987 and his M.Eng. degree in 1990. After receiving his Ph.D. degree from the Institute of Rock and Soil Mechanics, Chinese Academy of Sciences (CAS) in 1996, he stayed for researching. He moved to Shandong University in 2000 as Dean of the School of Civil Engineering and Director of the Geotechnical and Structural Engineering Research Center.

== Honours and awards ==
- 2006 the 9th China Youth Science and Technology Award
- November 22, 2019 Member of the Chinese Academy of Engineering (CAE)
