= Zhang Fengzhong =

- 张凤中

Director of Political Work Department of the Rocket Force
- Incumbent
- Assumed office April 2023
- Preceded by: Cheng Jian

Personal details
- Born: 8 March 1966 (age 60) Xinyi County, Jiangsu, China
- Party: Chinese Communist Party
- Education: Second Artillery Force Engineering Academy; PLA National Defence University

Military service
- Allegiance: People's Republic of China
- Branch/service: People's Liberation Army Ground Force; People's Liberation Army Rocket Force
- Years of service: 1984–present
- Rank: Lieutenant general

Chinese name
- Simplified Chinese: 张凤中
- Traditional Chinese: 張鳳中
Transcriptions
Standard Mandarin
- Hanyu Pinyin: Zhāng Fèngzhōng

Zhang Fengzhong (Chinese: 张凤中; born 8 March 1966) is a major general in the People's Liberation Army of China.

He is a representative of the 20th National Congress of the Chinese Communist Party and an alternate of the 20th Central Committee of the Chinese Communist Party.

== Biography ==
Zhang was born in Xinyi County (now Xinyi), Jiangsu, on 8 March 1966, to Zhang Shilun (张士伦) and Su Yulian (苏玉莲). He is the third of five children. In 1984, he entered the Second Artillery Force Engineering Academy and also graduated from the PLA National Defence University.

He enlisted in the People's Liberation Army (PLA) in September 1984, and joined the Chinese Communist Party (CCP) in June 1989. He was director of the Political Department of the 53 Rocket Force Base before serving as political commissar of Rocket Army Base 51 in July 2016. He was political commissar of the 65th Rocket Army Base in March 2017 and subsequently political commissar of the 66th Rocket Army Base in March 2019.

On 1 October 2019, he led the rocket military team to participate in the military parade of Celebrating the 70th Anniversary of the Founding of the People's Republic of China. In April 2023, he was promoted to the position of Director of the Political Work Department of the Rocket Force.

He was promoted to the rank of major general (shaojiang) in July 2017. In April 2023, he was promoted to the rank of lieutenant general (zhongjiang).

Military offices
Preceded by Cheng Jian	Director of the Political Work Department of the Rocket Force; 2023-present	Incumbent
