= Yao Lin =

Chinese politician (born 1965)

- 姚林
- Born: October 1965 (age 60); Nantong County, Jiangsu, China
- Education: Dalian University of Technology; University of Science and Technology Beijing
- Occupations: Executive, politician
- Years active: 2013–present
- Agent: China Mineral Resources Group Co., Ltd.
- Political party: Chinese Communist Party

Yao Lin (Chinese: 姚林; pinyin: Yáo Lín; born October 1965) is a Chinese executive and politician, currently serving as chairman of the China Mineral Resources Group Co., Ltd.

He is a representative of the 20th National Congress of the Chinese Communist Party and an alternate of the 20th Central Committee of the Chinese Communist Party.

== Biography ==
Yao was born in Nantong County (now Nantong), Jiangsu, in October 1965. He received his master's degree from Dalian University of Technology in 2000 before gaining a doctor's degree from the University of Science and Technology Beijing.

In 1988, he joined the Ansteel Group, where he was promoted to party secretary in May 2015 and chairman in August 2018. He also was chairman of Pangang Group from January 2013 to March 2015 and chairman of Anshan Iron and Steel Group Co., Ltd. from March 2015 to August 2018. In October 2019, he became chairman of the Aluminum Corporation of China, a post he kept until July 2022, when he was appointed chairman of the newly founded China Mineral Resources Group Co., Ltd.

Business positions
Preceded by Yang Hua (杨华)	Chairman of Ansteel Group; 2018–2019	Succeeded by Tan Chengxu
Preceded by Ge Honglin	Chairman of the Aluminum Corporation of China; 2019–2022	Succeeded by TBA
New title	Chairman of the China Mineral Resources Group Co., Ltd. 2022–	Incumbent
