= Zulhayat Ismail =

Chinese academic and politician (born 1977)

- 祖力亚提·司马义

Party Branch Secretary of the Jiangsu Provincial Ecology and Environment Department
- Incumbent
- Assumed office October 2024
- Preceded by: Lu Weidong

Director of the Education Department of Xinjiang Uygur Autonomous Region
- In office March 2023 – October 2024
- Preceded by: Anido Ibrahim

Personal details
- Born: September 1977 (age 48) Ürümqi, Xinjiang, China
- Party: Chinese Communist Party
- Education: Peking University; Xinjiang University

Chinese name
- Simplified Chinese: 祖力亚提·司马义
- Traditional Chinese: 祖力亞提·司馬義
Transcriptions
Standard Mandarin
- Hanyu Pinyin: Zǔlìyàtí Sīmǎyì

Zulhayat Ismail (Chinese: 祖力亚提·司马义; born September 1977) is a Chinese university administrator and politician of Uyghur ethnicity, currently serving as Party Branch Secretary of the Jiangsu Provincial Ecology and Environment Department. She was director of the Education Department of Xinjiang Uygur Autonomous Region from March 2023 to October 2024.

She is a representative of the 20th National Congress of the Chinese Communist Party and an alternate of the 20th Central Committee of the Chinese Communist Party.

== Early life and education ==
Zulhayat Ismail was born in Ürümqi, Xinjiang, in September 1977. In 2008 she graduated from Peking University with a Ph.D. in sociology. From January 2010 to November 2012, she was a postdoctoral fellow at Xinjiang University.

== Career ==
She began her political career in June 2014, when she was appointed deputy director of the Middle School and University Offices of the School Department of the Central Committee of the Communist Youth League of China.

She has served as vice president of Xinjiang University, as well as deputy party secretary and dean of the School of Marxism at Xinjiang University. She was deputy party secretary and vice president of Kashi University in September 2022 and subsequently director of the Education Department of Xinjiang Uygur Autonomous Region in March 2023.

In October 2024, she was appointed Party Branch Secretary of the Jiangsu Provincial Ecology and Environment Department.

Government offices
Preceded by Anido Ibrahim	Director of the Education Department of Xinjiang Uygur Autonomous Region; 2023–2024	Succeeded by TBA
Party political offices
Preceded by Lu Weidong (陆卫东)	Party Branch Secretary of the Jiangsu Provincial Ecology and Environment Department; 2024–present	Incumbent
