= Shuanglong station =

Shuanglong station may refer to:

- Shuanglong station (Chongqing Rail Transit), a station on Line 3 of Chongqing Rail Transit.
- Shuanglong station (Shenzhen Metro), a station on Line 3 of Shenzhen Metro.
- Shuanglong station (Nanjing Metro), a station on Line S3 of Nanjing Metro.
