= Li Wentang =

Chinese university administrator and politician

- 李文堂

Chief Education Officer of the Central Party School of the Chinese Communist Party
- Incumbent
- Assumed office July 2022
- President: Chen Xi

Personal details
- Born: 1965 (age 60–61) Jinhua County, Zhejiang, China
- Party: Chinese Communist Party
- Education: Shandong University; Institute of Philosophy, Chinese Academy of Social Sciences

Li Wentang (Chinese: 李文堂; pinyin: Lǐ Wéntáng; born 1965) is a Chinese university administrator and politician who is the current chief education officer of the Central Party School of the Chinese Communist Party, in office since July 2022.

He is an alternate of the 20th Central Committee of the Chinese Communist Party.

== Biography ==
Li was born in Jinhua County (now Jinhua), Zhejiang, in 1965, and graduated from Shandong University and the Institute of Philosophy, Chinese Academy of Social Sciences. He also studied at the University of Lausanne and the University of Basel. He was a visiting scholar at LMU Munich and the University of Ireland.

Beginning in 1996, he served in several posts in the Central Party School of the Chinese Communist Party, including lecturer, professor, deputy director and director of Teaching and Research Department, and director of Education and Research Department of Culture and History. In July 2022, he was appointed chief education officer, a position at vice-ministerial level.

== Publications ==
- 真理之光 [Light of Truth] (in Chinese). Suzhou, Jiangsu: Jiangsu People's Publishing House. 2008. ISBN 9787214049230.
