= Shuanglong, Hunan =

Shuanglong 双龙镇
- Town
- Location in Hunan
- Coordinates: 28.431786°N 109.575334°E
- Country: People's Republic of China
- Province: Hunan
- Autonomous prefecture: Xiangxi
- County: Huayuan County

Area
  - Total: 155.7 km^{2} (60.1 sq mi)

Population (2015)
  - Total: 29,000
  - Density: 190/km^{2} (480/sq mi)
- Time zone: UTC+08:00 (China Standard)
- Postal code: 416000
- Area code: 0743

Shuanglong Town (simplified Chinese: 双龙镇; traditional Chinese: 雙龍鎮; pinyin: Shuānglóng Zhèn) is a rural town in Huayuan County, Xiangxi Tujia and Miao Autonomous Prefecture, in northwestern Hunan, China. As of the 2015 census it had a population of 29,000 and an area of 155.7 square kilometres (60.1 sq mi).

== History ==
On November 3, 2013, Chinese Communist Party general secretary Xi Jinping explored the Shibadong Village, where he first put forward the scheme of the "targeted poverty alleviation" (精准扶贫). Shibadong Village became a testing ground for the new initiative in since Xi's investigation.

On November 30, 2015, Pailiao Township, Paibi Township and Dongmaku Township merged to form the Shuanglong Town.

== Geography ==
Zixia Lake (紫霞湖) is a lake and the largest body of water in the town.

The Ancient Miao River (古苗河) flows through the town.

== Economy ==
Special local products such as native chicken, mushrooms, Miao embroidery are important to the economy.

Kiwifruit and cattle rearing are also the source of revenue.

== Transportation ==
- Jishou-Chaling Expressway
- National Highway G209
- National Highway G319

== Attractions ==
The Yelang Shiba Cave (夜郎十八洞) is a karst cave in the town and became a tourist attraction in 2016.
