= Li Ruxin =

- 李儒新
- Born: October 1969 (age 56); Jian'ou, Fujian, China
- Education: Tianjin University
- Scientific career
- Fields: Laser physics
- Workplaces: Shanghai Institute of Optics and Fine Mechanics, Chinese Academy of Sciences

Li Ruxin (Chinese: 李儒新; pinyin: Lǐ Rúxīn; born October 1969) is a Chinese physicist and an academician of the Chinese Academy of Sciences (CAS). He is now the dean of the Shanghai Institute of Optics and Fine Mechanics, Chinese Academy of Sciences (CAS). He is also vice president and Party secretary of ShanghaiTech University.

== Biography ==
Li was born in Jian'ou, Fujian in October 1969. In 1990 he graduated from Tianjin University. After graduation, he studied, then taught at the Shanghai Institute of Optics and Fine Mechanics, Chinese Academy of Sciences (CAS). He did post-doctoral research at Uppsala University and the University of Tokyo from 1996 to 1998. In November 2017 he was elected an academician of the Chinese Academy of Sciences (CAS).
