= Li Jianrong =

Chinese engineer

- 李建榕
- Born: 1966 (age 58–59); China
- Scientific career
- Fields: Aircraft engine
- Institutions: Aviation Industry Corporation of China (AVIC)

Li Jianrong (Chinese: 李建榕; pinyin: Lǐ Jiànróng; born 1966) is a Chinese engineer, currently serving as deputy director of Shenyang Engine Design and Research Institute of the Aviation Industry Corporation of China (AVIC) and chief engineer of AVIC Aerospace Research Institute.

Li is an alternate of the 20th Central Committee of the Chinese Communist Party.

== Biography ==
Li was born in 1966. She worked at the AVIC Aerospace Research Institute before being appointed party secretary and vice president of the AVIC Gas Turbine Institute.

== Honours and awards ==
- 2010 State Science and Technology Progress Award (Special) for the main development technologies of "Taihang" engine
