= Members of the 20th Central Committee of the Chinese Communist Party =

The 20th Central Committee of the Chinese Communist Party was elected by the 20th National Congress in 2022, with 219 individuals serving as members during this term. Of those, 205 were elected by the 20th National Congress, and 13 alternates have been advanced to fill vacant spots amongst the membership.

== Members ==
Members of the 20th Central Committee of the Chinese Communist Party
Name		19th CC	Birth	PM	Birthplace	Ethnicity	Gender	Ref.
Bagatur	巴特尔	Member	1955	1981	Liaoning	Mongol	Male	
Cai Jianjiang	蔡剑江	Alternate	1963	—	Jiangsu	Han	Male	
Cai Qi	蔡奇	Member	1955	1975	Fujian	Han	Male	
Chang Dingqiu	常丁求	Alternate	1967	—	Hunan	Han	Male	
Chen Gang	陈刚	Alternate	1965	1986	Jiangsu	Han	Male	
Chen Jining	陈吉宁	Member	1964	1984	Liaoning	Han	Male	
Chen Min'er	陈敏尔	Member	1960	1982	Zhejiang	Han	Male	
Chen Wenqing	陈文清	Member	1960	1983	Sichuan	Han	Male	
Chen Xiaojiang	陈小江	Nonmember	1962	1983	Zhejiang	Han	Male	
Chen Xu	陈旭	Alternate	1963	1984	Hebei	Han	Female	
Chen Yixin	陈一新	Alternate	1959	1982	Zhejiang	Han	Male	
Cheng Lihua	程丽华	Alternate	1965	1987	Henan	Han	Female	
Ding Xuedong	丁学东	Member	1960	1984	Jiangsu	Han	Male	
Ding Xuexiang	丁薛祥	Member	1962	1984	Jiangsu	Han	Male	
Dong Jun	董军	Nonmember	1961	—	Shandong	Han	Male	
Erkin Tuniyaz	艾尔肯·吐尼亚孜	Alternate	1961	1983	Xinjiang	Uyghur	Male	
Feng Fei	冯飞	Nonmember	1962	1985	Jiangxi	Han	Male	
Fu Hua	傅华	Nonmember	1964	1993	Jiangsu	Han	Male	
Gao Xiang	高翔	Nonmember	1963	1994	Sichuan	Han	Male	
Gao Zhidan	高志丹	Nonmember	1963	—	Jilin	Han	Male	
Gong Zheng	龚正	Member	1960	1985	Jiangsu	Han	Male	
Guo Puxiao	郭普校	Nonmember	1964	—	Shaanxi	Han	Male	
Han Jun	韩俊	Nonmember	1963	—	Shandong	Han	Male	
Han Wenxiu	韩文秀	Nonmember	1963	—	Hebei	Han	Male	
Hao Peng	郝鹏	Member	1960	1982	Shaanxi	Han	Male	
He Hongjun	何宏军	Nonmember	1961	—	Shaanxi	Han	Male	
He Junke	贺军科	Alternate	1969	1995	Shaanxi	Han	Male	
He Lifeng	何立峰	Member	1955	1981	Guangdong	Han	Male	
He Rong	贺荣	Nonmember	1962	1984	Shandong	Han	Female	
He Weidong	何卫东	Nonmember	1957	1978	Fujian	Han	Male	
Hou Jianguo	侯建国	Member	1959	1985	Fujian	Han	Male	
Hou Kai	侯凯	Nonmember	1962	1987	Liaoning	Han	Male	
Hu Changsheng	胡昌升	Alternate	1963	1986	Jiangxi	Han	Male	
Hu Chunhua	胡春华	Member	1963	1983	Hubei	Han	Male	
Hu Henghua	胡衡华	Alternate	1963	1985	Hunan	Han	Male	
Hu Heping	胡和平	Member	1962	1982	Shandong	Han	Male	
Hu Yuting	胡玉亭	Nonmember	1964	1986	Shanxi	Han	Male	
Hu Zhongming	胡中明	Nonmember	1964	—	Shandong	Han	Male	
Huai Jinpeng	怀进鹏	Member	1962	1986	Shandong	Han	Male	
Huang Jianfa	黄建发	Nonmember	1965	1987	Fujian	Han	Male	
Huang Kunming	黄坤明	Member	1956	1976	Fujian	Han	Male	
Huang Ming	黄铭	Nonmember	1963	—	Jiangsu	Han	Male	
Huang Qiang	黄强	Nonmember	1963	1985	Zhejiang	Han	Male	
Huang Shouhong	黄守宏	Member	1964	—	Henan	Han	Male	
Huang Xiaowei	黄晓薇	Alternate	1961	1983	Liaoning	Han	Female	
Jin Xiangjun	金湘军	Nonmember	1964	1984	Hunan	Han	Male	
Jin Zhuanglong	金壮龙	Member	1964	1984	Zhejiang	Han	Male	
Jing Junhai	景俊海	Alternate	1960	1982	Shaanxi	Han	Male	
Ju Qiansheng	巨乾生	Nonmember	1962	—	Shaanxi	Han	Male	
Lan Fo'an	蓝佛安	Nonmember	1962	1985	Guangdong	Han	Male	
Lan Tianli	蓝天立	Alternate	1962	1985	Guangxi	Zhuang	Male	
Lei Fanpei	雷凡培	Alternate	1963	1985	Shaanxi	Han	Male	
Li Bingjun	李炳军	Nonmember	1963	1984	Shandong	Han	Male	
Li Fengbiao	李凤彪	Member	1959	—	Hebei	Han	Male	
Li Ganjie	李干杰	Member	1964	1984	Hunan	Han	Male	
Li Guoying	李国英	Member	1963	1988	Henan	Han	Male	
Li Hongzhong	李鸿忠	Member	1956	1976	Shenyang	Han	Male	
Li Lecheng	李乐成	Nonmember	1965	1991	Hubei	Han	Male	
Li Qiang	李强	Member	1959	1983	Zhejiang	Han	Male	
Li Qiaoming	李桥铭	Member	1961	—	Henan	Han	Male	
Li Shangfu	李尚福	Member	1958	1980	Jiangxi	Han	Male	
Li Shulei	李书磊	Nonmember	1964	1986	Henan	Han	Male	
Li Wei	李伟	Nonmember	1960	—	Henan	Han	Male	
Li Xi	李希	Member	1956	1982	Gansu	Han	Male	
Li Xiaohong	李晓红	Member	1959	1982	Chongqing	Han	Male	
Li Xiaoxin	李小新	Nonmember	1962	—	Hunan	Han	Female	
Li Yi	李屹	Member	1960	1983	Sichuan	Han	Male	
Li Yifei	李邑飞	Member	1964	1984	Yunnan	Han	Male	
Li Yuchao	李玉超	Alternate	1962	—	Henan	Han	Male	
Liang Huiling	梁惠玲	Nonmember	1962	1985	Hubei	Han	Female	
Liang Yanshun	梁言顺	Nonmember	1962	1985	Shandong	Han	Male	
Lin Wu	林武	Nonmember	1962	1987	Fujian	Han	Male	
Lin Xiangyang	林向阳	Nonmember	1964	—	Fujian	Han	Male	
Liu Faqing	刘发庆	Alternate	1964	—	Henan	Han	Male	
Liu Guozhong	刘国中	Member	1962	1986	Heilongjiang	Han	Male	
Liu Haixing	刘海星	Nonmember	1963	—	Jiangsu	Han	Male	
Liu Jianchao	刘建超	Nonmember	1964	1986	Jilin	Han	Male	
Liu Jinguo	刘金国	Member	1955	1975	Hebei	Han	Male	
Liu Junchen	刘俊臣	Nonmember	1963	1985	Henan	Han	Male	
Liu Ning	刘宁	Alternate	1962	1990	Jilin	Han	Male	
Liu Qingsong	刘青松	Nonmember	1963	—	Shandong	Han	Male	
Liu Wei	刘伟	Nonmember	1965	1997	Henan	Han	Male	
Liu Xiaoming	刘小明	Nonmember	1964	1991	Jiangsu	Han	Male	
Liu Zhenli	刘振立	Member	1964	1984	Hebei	Han	Male	
Lou Yangsheng	楼阳生	Nonmember	1959	1981	Zhejiang	Han	Male	
Lu Hao	陆昊	Member	1967	1985	Shanghai	Han	Male	
Lu Zhiyuan	陆治原	Nonmember	1964	1987	Shaanxi	Han	Male	
Luo Wen	罗文	Nonmember	1964	—	Hunan	Han	Male	
Ma Xiaowei	马晓伟	Nonmember	1959	1982	Shanxi	Han	Male	
Ma Xingrui	马兴瑞	Member	1959	1988	Heilongjiang	Han	Male	
Mao Weiming	毛伟明	Alternate	1961	1985	Zhejiang	Han	Male	
Meng Fanli	孟凡利	Nonmember	1965	1986	Shandong	Han	Male	
Meng Xiangfeng	孟祥锋	Member	1964	1986	Hebei	Han	Male	
Miao Hua	苗华	Nonmember	1955	1973	Jiangsu	Han	Male	
Ni Hong	倪虹	Nonmember	1962	1983	Liaoning	Han	Male	
Ni Yuefeng	倪岳峰	Member	1964	1983	Anhui	Han	Male	
Nurlan Abelmanjen	努尔兰·阿不都满金	Member	1962	1985	Xinjiang	Kazakh	Male	
Pan Yue	潘岳	Alternate	1963	1987	Jiangsu	Han	Male	
Pei Jinjia	裴金佳	Alternate	1963	1990	Fujian	Han	Male	
Qi Yu	齐玉	Nonmember	1961	1982	Shaanxi	Han	Male	
Qin Gang	秦刚	Nonmember	1966	1986	Hebei	Han	Male	
Qin Shutong	秦树桐	Nonmember	1963	—	Jiangsu	Han	Male	
Qu Qingshan	曲青山	Member	1957	1975	Shandong	Han	Male	
Ren Zhenhe	任振鹤	Nonmember	1964	1984	Hubei	Tujia	Male	
Shen Chunyao	沈春耀	Alternate	1960	—	Shandong	Han	Male	
Shen Haixiong	慎海雄	Alternate	1967	1987	Zhejiang	Han	Male	
Shen Xiaoming	沈晓明	Member	1963	1984	Zhejiang	Han	Male	
Shen Yiqin	谌贻琴	Member	1959	1985	Guizhou	Bai	Female	
Shen Yueyue	沈跃跃	Member	1957	1981	Zhejiang	Han	Female	
Shi Taifeng	石泰峰	Member	1956	1982	Shanxi	Han	Male	
Sun Jinlong	孙金龙	Member	1962	1986	Hubei	Han	Male	
Sun Shaocheng	孙绍骋	Member	1960	1986	Shandong	Han	Male	
Tang Dengjie	唐登杰	Alternate	1964	1991	Jiangsu	Han	Male	
Tang Renjian	唐仁健	Member	1962	1991	Chongqing	Han	Male	
Tie Ning	铁凝	Member	1957	1975	Beijing	Han	Female	
Tong Jianming	童建明	Nonmember	1963	1985	Zhejiang	Han	Male	
Tuo Zhen	庹震	Alternate	1959	1982	Henan	Han	Male	
Wan Lijun	万立骏	Member	1957	—	Liaoning	Han	Male	
Wang Chunning	王春宁	Alternate	1963	1986	Shandong	Han	Male	
Wang Dongming	王东明	Member	1956	1975	Liaoning	Han	Male	
Wang Guanghua	王广华	Nonmember	1963	1987	Henan	Han	Male	
Wang Haijiang	汪海江	Nonmember	1963	—	Sichuan	Han	Male	
Wang Hao	王浩	Nonmember	1963	1984	Shandong	Han	Male	
Wang Huning	王沪宁	Member	1955	1984	Shanghai	Han	Male	
Wang Junzheng	王君正	Alternate	1963	1987	Shandong	Han	Male	
Wang Kai	王凯	Nonmember	1962	1984	Henan	Han	Male	
Wang Kai	王凯	Nonmember	1963	—	Sichuan	Han	Male	
Wang Lixia	王莉霞	Alternate	1964	1992	Liaoning	Mongol	Female	
Wang Menghui	王蒙徽	Member	1960	1981	Jiangsu	Han	Male	
Wang Ning	王宁	Alternate	1961	1983	Hunan	Han	Male	
Wang Peng	王鹏	Nonmember	1964	1986	Hunan	Han	Male	
Wang Qiang	王强	Member	1963	—	Sichuan	Han	Male	
Wang Qingxian	王清宪	Nonmember	1963	1986	Hebei	Han	Male	
Wang Renhua	王仁华	Nonmember	1961	—	Sichuan	Han	Male	
Wang Shouwen	王受文	Nonmember	1966	1986	Anhui	Han	Male	
Wang Weizhong	王伟中	Alternate	1962	1983	Shanxi	Han	Male	
Wang Wenquan	王文全	Nonmember	1962	—	Hubei	Han	Male	
Wang Wentao	王文涛	Alternate	1964	1994	Jiangsu	Han	Male	
Wang Xiangxi	王祥喜	Nonmember	1962	1987	Hubei	Han	Male	
Wang Xiaohong	王小洪	Member	1957	1982	Fujian	Han	Male	
Wang Xiaohui	王晓晖	Member	1962	—	Jilin	Han	Male	
Wang Xiubin	王秀斌	Alternate	1964	—	Jiangsu	Han	Male	
Wang Yi	王毅	Member	1953	1981	Beijing	Han	Male	
Wang Yong	王勇	Member	1955	1978	Liaoning	Han	Male	
Wang Yubo	王予波	Nonmember	1963	1984	Henan	Han	Male	
Wang Zhengpu	王正谱	Nonmember	1963	1987	Shandong	Han	Male	
Wang Zhijun	王志军	Nonmember	1965	—	Inner Mongolia	Han	Male	
Wang Zhonglin	王忠林	Nonmember	1962	1984	Shandong	Han	Male	
Wu Hansheng	吴汉圣	Nonmember	1963	1984	Shandong	Han	Male	
Wu Xiaojun	吴晓军	Nonmember	1966	1986	Jiangxi	Han	Male	
Wu Yanan	吴亚男	Nonmember	1962	1984	Hebei	Han	Male	
Wu Zhenglong	吴政隆	Member	1964	1987	Jiangsu	Han	Male	
Xi Jinping	习近平	Member	1953	1974	Beijing	Han	Male	
Xiao Jie	肖捷	Member	1957	1985	Beijing	Han	Male	
Xiao Pei	肖培	Nonmember	1961	1985	Jiangsu	Han	Male	
Xie Chuntao	谢春涛	Alternate	1963	1985	Shandong	Han	Male	
Xin Changxing	信长星	Alternate	1964	1986	Shandong	Han	Male	
Xu Deqing	徐德清	Nonmember	1963	—	Sichuan	Han	Male	
Xu Kunlin	许昆林	Nonmember	1965	—	Fujian	Han	Male	
Xu Lin	徐麟	Nonmember	1963	1982	Shanghai	Han	Male	
Xu Qiling	徐起零	Nonmember	1962	—	Henan	Han	Male	
Xu Qin	许勤	Member	1961	1982	Jiangsu	Han	Male	
Xu Xisheng	徐西盛	Nonmember	1964	—	Shandong	Han	Male	
Xu Xueqiang	许学强	Nonmember	1962	—	Hunan	Han	Male	
Xu Zhongbo	徐忠波	Alternate	1960	—	Shandong	Han	Male	
Yan Jinhai	严金海	Alternate	1962	1983	Tibet	Tibetan	Male	
Yang Cheng	杨诚	Nonmember	1964	—	Hunan	Han	Male	
Yang Xuejun	杨学军	Member	1963	1984	Shandong	Han	Male	
Yang Zhiliang	杨志亮	Nonmember	1962	—	Henan	Han	Male	
Ye Jianchun	叶建春	Nonmember	1965	1985	Fujian	Han	Male	
Yi Huiman	易会满	Alternate	1964	—	Zhejiang	Han	Male	
Yi Lianhong	易炼红	Alternate	1959	1985	Hunan	Han	Male	
Yin Hejun	阴和俊	Alternate	1963	1983	Shanxi	Han	Male	
Yin Hong	尹弘	Alternate	1963	1984	Zhejiang	Han	Male	
Yin Li	尹力	Member	1962	1980	Shandong	Han	Male	
Yin Yong	殷勇	Nonmember	1969	1994	Hubei	Han	Male	
Ying Yong	应勇	Member	1957	1979	Zhejiang	Han	Male	
Yu Jianhua	俞建华	Nonmember	1961	1991	Jiangsu	Han	Male	
Yu Qingjiang	俞庆江	Nonmember	1963	—	Jiangsu	Han	Male	
Yuan Huazhi	袁华智	Nonmember	1961	—	Hubei	Han	Male	
Yuan Jiajun	袁家军	Member	1962	1992	Jilin	Han	Male	
Zhang Gong	张工	Alternate	1961	1992	Beijing	Han	Male	
Zhang Guoqing	张国清	Member	1964	1984	Henan	Han	Male	
Zhang Hongbing	张红兵	Nonmember	1966	—	Hubei	Han	Male	
Zhang Hongsen	张宏森	Nonmember	1964	1988	Shandong	Han	Male	
Zhang Jun	张军	Member	1956	1974	Shandong	Han	Male	
Zhang Lin	张林	Nonmember	1965	—	—	Han	Male	
Zhang Qingwei	张庆伟	Member	1961	1992	Hebei	Han	Male	
Zhang Shengmin	张升民	Member	1958	1979	Shaanxi	Han	Male	
Zhang Youxia	张又侠	Member	1950	1969	Beijing	Han	Male	
Zhang Yupu	张雨浦	Nonmember	1962	1984	Shandong	Hui	Male	
Zhang Yuzhuo	张玉卓	Alternate	1962	1985	Shandong	Han	Male	
Zhao Gang	赵刚	Nonmember	1968	1987	Liaoning	Han	Male	
Zhao Leji	赵乐际	Member	1957	1975	Shandong	Han	Male	
Zhao Long	赵龙	Nonmember	1967	1988	Liaoning	Han	Male	
Zhao Xiaozhe	赵晓哲	Nonmember	1963	—	Liaoning	Han	Male	
Zhao Yide	赵一德	Alternate	1965	1985	Zhejiang	Han	Male	
Zheng Shanjie	郑栅洁	Nonmember	1961	1985	Fujian	Han	Male	
Zheng Xincong	郑新聪	Nonmember	1963	1986	Fujian	Han	Male	
Zhong Shaojun	钟绍军	Nonmember	1968	—	Zhejiang	Han	Male	
Zhou Naixiang	周乃翔	Alternate	1961	1987	Jiangsu	Han	Male	
Zhou Qiang	周强	Member	1960	1978	Hubei	Han	Male	
Zhou Zuyi	周祖翼	Nonmember	1965	1984	Zhejiang	Han	Male	
Zhuang Rongwen	庄荣文	Nonmember	1961	1982	Fujian	Han	Male	
Zou Jiayi	邹加怡	Nonmember	1963	1984	Jiangsu	Han	Female	
