= Presidium of the 20th National Congress of the Chinese Communist Party =

The Presidium of the 20th National Congress of the Chinese Communist Party was elected by congress delegates in a preparatory meeting before the convening of the congress. The Presidium of the 20th National Congress leads the organisation and the agenda of the aforementioned congress.

The Presidium of the 20th National Congress elected at its 1st Plenary Session the Standing Committee of the Presidium of the 20th National Congress.

The preparatory session of the 20th National Congress elected Wang Huning as secretary-general, while Ding Xuexiang, Chen Xi, Guo Shengkun and Huang Kunming were elected as deputy secretaries-general.

== Standing Committee of the Presidium ==
Members of the Standing Committee of the Presidium of the 20th National Congress
Rank	Name	Hanzi	Birth	Electoral unit	Gender	Status	Ref.
1	Xi Jinping	习近平	1953	Guangxi	Male	Active	
2	Li Keqiang	李克强	1955	Gansu	Male	Active	
3	Li Zhanshu	栗战书	1950	Sichuan	Male	Active	
4	Wang Yang	汪洋	1955	Tibet	Male	Active	
5	Wang Huning	王沪宁	1955	Guizhou	Male	Active	
6	Zhao Leji	赵乐际	1957	Inner Mongolia	Male	Active	
7	Han Zheng	韩正	1954	Hainan	Male	Active	
8	Wang Qishan	王岐山	1948	Jiangsu	Male	Active	
9	Ding Xuexiang	丁薛祥	1962	Central State Organs	Male	Active	
10	Wang Chen	王晨	1950	Hubei	Male	Active	
11	Liu He	刘鹤	1952	Fujian	Male	Active	
12	Xu Qiliang	许其亮	1950	Army and Police	Male	Active	
13	Sun Chunlan	孙春兰	1950	Shaanxi	Female	Active	
14	Li Xi	李希	1956	Guangdong	Male	Active	
15	Li Qiang	李强	1959	Shanghai	Male	Active	
16	Li Hongzhong	李鸿忠	1956	Tianjin	Male	Active	
17	Yang Jiechi	杨洁篪	1950	Liaoning	Male	Active	
18	Yang Xiaodu	杨晓渡	1953	Xinjiang	Male	Active	
19	Zhang Youxia	张又侠	1950	Army and Police	Male	Active	
20	Chen Xi	陈希	1953	Ningxia	Male	Active	
21	Chen Quanguo	陈全国	1955	Anhui	Male	Active	
22	Chen Min'er	陈敏尔	1960	Chongqing	Male	Active	
23	Hu Chunhua	胡春华	1963	Heilongjiang	Male	Active	
24	Guo Shengkun	郭声琨	1954	Yunnan	Male	Active	
25	Huang Kunming	黄坤明	1956	Jiangxi	Male	Active	
26	Cai Qi	蔡奇	1955	Beijing	Male	Active	
27	Jiang Zemin	江泽民	1926	Invited	Male	Retired	
28	Hu Jintao	胡锦涛	1942	Invited	Male	Retired	
29	Zhu Rongji	朱镕基	1928	Invited	Male	Retired	
30	Li Ruihuan	李瑞环	1934	Invited	Male	Retired	
31	Wu Bangguo	吴邦国	1941	Invited	Male	Retired	
32	Wen Jiabao	温家宝	1942	Invited	Male	Retired	
33	Jia Qinglin	贾庆林	1940	Invited	Male	Retired	
34	Zhang Dejiang	张德江	1946	Invited	Male	Retired	
35	Yu Zhengsheng	俞正声	1945	Invited	Male	Retired	
36	Song Ping	宋平	1917	Invited	Male	Retired	
37	Li Lanqing	李岚清	1932	Invited	Male	Retired	
38	Zeng Qinghong	曾庆红	1939	Invited	Male	Retired	
39	Wu Guanzheng	吴官正	1938	Invited	Male	Retired	
40	Li Changchun	李长春	1944	Invited	Male	Retired	
41	Luo Gan	罗干	1935	Invited	Male	Retired	
42	He Guoqiang	贺国强	1943	Invited	Male	Retired	
43	Liu Yunshan	刘云山	1947	Invited	Male	Retired	
44	Zhang Gaoli	张高丽	1946	Invited	Male	Retired	
45	You Quan	尤权	1954	Shaanxi	Male	Active	
46	Zhang Qingli	张庆黎	1951	Sichuan	Male	Active	

== Members ==
Members of the Presidium of the 20th National Congress
Name	Hanzi	Birth	Electoral unit	Ethnicity	Gender	Status	Ref.
Ding Xuedong	丁学东	1960	Central State Organs	Han	Male	Active	
Ding Xuexiang	丁薛祥	1962	Central State Organs	Han	Male	Active	
Wan Lijun	万立骏	1957	Central State Organs	Han	Male	Active	
Xi Jinping	习近平	1953	Guangxi	Han	Male	Active	
Ma Biao	马飚	1954	Guangxi	Zhuang	Male	Active	
Ma Xingrui	马兴瑞	1959	Xinjiang	Han	Male	Active	
Ma Xiaowei	马晓伟	1959	Central State Organs	Han	Male	Active	
Wang Ning	王宁	1955	Yunnan	Han	Male	Active	
Wang Jun	王军	1958	Central State Organs	Han	Male	Active	
Wang Yong	王勇	1955	Army and Police	Han	Male	Active	
Wang Chen	王晨	1950	Hubei	Han	Male	Active	
Wang Peng	王鹏	1964	Army and Police	Han	Male	Active	
Wang Yi	王毅	1953	Central State Organs	Han	Male	Active	
Wang Xiaohong	王小洪	1957	Central State Organs	Han	Male	Active	
Wang Guanghua	王广华	1963	Central State Organs	Han	Male	Active	
Wang Renhua	王仁华	1962	Army and Police	Han	Male	Active	
Wang Wenquan	王文全	1962	Army and Police	Han	Male	Active	
Wang Wentao	王文涛	1964	Central State Organs	Han	Male	Active	
Wang Zhengwei	王正伟	1957	Henan	Hui	Male	Active	
Wang Dongming	王东明	1956	Henan	Han	Male	Active	
Wang Weizhong	王伟中	1962	Guangdong	Han	Male	Active	
Wang Zhigang	王志刚	1957	Central State Organs	Han	Male	Active	
Wang Qishan	王岐山	1948	Jiangsu	Han	Male	Active	
Wang Huning	王沪宁	1955	Guizhou	Han	Male	Active	
Wang Junzheng	王君正	1963	Tibet	Han	Male	Active	
Wang Jianwu	王建武	1958	Army and Police	Han	Male	Active	
Wang Lixia	王莉霞	1964	Inner Mongolia	Mongolian	Male	Active	
Wang Xiaohui	王晓晖	1962	Sichuan	Han	Male	Active	
Wang Xiangxi	王祥喜	1962	Central Enterprise System	Han	Male	Active	
Wang Menghui	王蒙徽	1960	Hubei	Han	Male	Active	
You Quan	尤权	1954	Shaanxi	Han	Male	Active	
Yin Li	尹力	1962	Fujian	Han	Male	Active	
Yin Hong	尹弘	1963	Gansu	Han	Male	Active	
Bagatur	巴特尔	1955	Inner Mongolia	Mongolian	Male	Active	
Arken Imirbaki	艾力更·依明巴海	1953	Xinjiang	Uyghur	Male	Active	
Erkin Tuniyaz	艾尔肯·吐尼亚孜	1961	Xinjiang	Uyghur	Male	Active	
Shi Taifeng	石泰峰	1956	Central State Organs	Han	Male	Active	
Lu Zhangong	卢展工	1952	Hanan	Han	Male	Active	
Tian Guoli	田国立	1960	Central Financial System	Han	Male	Active	
Padma Choling	白玛赤林	1951	Tibet	Tibetan	Male	Active	
Ji Bingxuan	吉炳轩	1951	Zhejiang	Han	Male	Active	
Gong Lijiao	巩立姣	—	Hebei	Han	Female	Active	
Qu Qingshan	曲青山	1957	Central State Organs	Han	Male	Active	
Zhu Rongji	朱镕基	1928	Invited	Han	Male	Retired	
Ting Bater	廷·巴特尔	1955	Inner Mongolia	Mongolian	Male	Active	
Zhuang Rongwen	庄荣文	1961	Central State Organs	Han	Male	Active	
Liu Ning	刘宁	1962	Guangxi	Han	Male	Active	
Liu Kun	刘昆	1956	Central State Organs	Han	Male	Active	
Liu He	刘鹤	1952	Fujian	Han	Male	Active	
Liu Yunshan	刘云山	1947	Invited	Han	Male	Retired	
Liu Shiquan	刘石泉	1963	Central Enterprise System	Han	Male	Active	
Liu Faqing	刘发庆	1964	Army and Police	Han	Male	Active	
Liu Liange	刘连舸	1961	Central Financial System	Han	Male	Active	
Liu Qingsong	刘青松	1963	Army and Police	Han	Male	Active	
Liu Qibao	刘奇葆	1953	Jiangsu	Han	Male	Active	
Liu Guozhong	刘国中	1962	Shaanxi	Han	Male	Active	
Liu Jinguo	刘金国	1955	Central State Organs	Han	Male	Active	
Liu Jianchao	刘建超	1964	Central State Organs	Han	Male	Active	
Liu Jieyi	刘结一	1957	Central State Organs	Han	Male	Active	
Liu Zhenli	刘振立	1964	Army and Police	Han	Male	Active	
Liu Zhenfang	刘振芳	1961	Central State Organs	Han	Male	Active	
Liu Haixing	刘海星	1963	Central State Organs	Han	Male	Active	
Qi Yu	齐玉	1961	Central State Organs	Han	Male	Active	
Jiang Jinquan	江金权	1959	Central State Organs	Han	Male	Active	
Jiang Zemin	江泽民	1926	Invited	Han	Male	Retired	
Xu Qin	许勤	1961	Heilongjiang	Han	Male	Active	
Xu Qiliang	许其亮	1950	Army and Police	Han	Male	Active	
Xu Xueqiang	许学强	1962	Army and Police	Han	Male	Active	
Sun Jinlong	孙金龙	1962	Central State Organs	Han	Male	Active	
Sun Shaocheng	孙绍骋	1960	Inner Mongolia	Han	Male	Active	
Sun Chunlan	孙春兰	1950	Shaanxi	Han	Female	Active	
Yan Jinhai	严金海	1962	Tibet	Tibetan	Male	Active	
Li Yi	李屹	1960	Central State Organs	Han	Male	Active	
Li Wei	李伟	1958	Army and Police	Han	Male	Active	
Li Chuang	李闯	—	Army and Police	Han	Male	Active	
Li Xi	李希	1956	Guangdong	Han	Male	Active	
Li Bin	李斌	1954	Army and Police	Han	Female	Active	
Li Qiang	李强	1959	Shanghai	Han	Male	Active	
Li Ganjie	李干杰	1964	Shandong	Han	Male	Active	
Li Xiaopeng	李小鹏	1959	Central State Organs	Han	Male	Active	
Li Xiaoxin	李小新	1962	Central State Organs	Han	Female	Active	
Li Changchun	李长春	1944	Invited	Han	Male	Retired	
Li Fengbiao	李凤彪	1959	Army and Police	Han	Male	Active	
Li Shulei	李书磊	1964	Central State Organs	Han	Male	Active	
Li Keqiang	李克强	1955	Gansu	Han	Male	Active	
Li Yifei	李邑飞	1964	Xinjiang	Han	Male	Active	
Li Lanqing	李岚清	1932	Invited	Han	Male	Retired	
Li Zuocheng	李作成	1953	Army and Police	Han	Male	Active	
Li Guoying	李国英	1963	Central State Organs	Han	Male	Active	
Li Xiaohong	李晓红	1959	Central State Organs	Han	Male	Active	
Li Hongzhong	李鸿忠	1956	Tianjin	Han	Male	Active	
Li Ruihuan	李瑞环	1934	Invited	Han	Male	Retired	
Li Ruxin	李儒新	1969	Shanghai	Han	Male	Active	
Yang Hong	杨宏	1963	Fujian	Han	Male	Active	
Yang Chuantang	杨传堂	1954	Central Enterprise System	Han	Male	Active	
Yang Xuejun	杨学军	1963	Army and Police	Han	Male	Active	
Yang Jiechi	杨洁篪	1950	Liaoning	Han	Male	Active	
Yang Zhenwu	杨振武	1955	Central State Organs	Han	Male	Active	
Yang Xiaodu	杨晓渡	1953	Xinjiang	Han	Male	Active	
Xiao Jie	肖捷	1957	Central State Organs	Han	Male	Active	
Wu Hansheng	吴汉圣	1963	Central State Organs	Han	Male	Active	
Wu Bangguo	吴邦国	1941	Invited	Han	Male	Retired	
Wu Guanzheng	吴官正	1938	Invited	Han	Male	Retired	
Wu Zhenglong	吴政隆	1964	Jiangsu	Han	Male	Active	
Wu Yansheng	吴燕生	1984	Central Enterprise System	Han	Male	Active	
Qiu Yong	邱勇	1964	Beijing	Han	Male	Active	
He Ping	何平	1957	Army and Police	Han	Male	Active	
He Lifeng	何立峰	1955	Central Financial System	Han	Male	Active	
Yu Jianfeng	余剑锋	1965	Central Enterprise System	Han	Male	Active	
Yu Liufen	余留芬	1969	Guizhou	Han	Female	Active	
Gu Shu	谷澍	1967	Central Financial System	Han	Male	Active	
Zou Jiayi	邹加怡	1963	Central State Organs	Han	Female	Active	
Xin Baoan	辛保安	1960	Central Enterprise System	Han	Male	Active	
Wang Yang	汪洋	1955	Tibet	Han	Male	Active	
Wang Dongjin	汪东进	1962	Central Enterprise System	Han	Male	Active	
Wang Yongqing	汪永清	1959	Liaoning	Han	Male	Active	
Shen Xiaoming	沈晓明	1963	Hainan	Han	Male	Active	
Shen Yueyue	沈跃跃	1957	Shandong	Han	Female	Active	
Huai Jinpeng	怀进鹏	1962	Central State Organs	Han	Male	Active	
Song Ping	宋平	1917	Invited	Han	Male	Retired	
Song Yushui	宋鱼水	1966	Beijing	Han	Female	Active	
Zhang Gong	张工	1961	Tianjin	Han	Male	Active	
Zhang Wei	张伟	1968	Central Enterprise System	Han	Male	Active	
Zhang Jun	张军	1960	Shanghai	Han	Male	Active	
Zhang Lin	张林	1965	Army and Police	Han	Male	Active	
Zhang Youxia	张又侠	1950	Army and Police	Han	Male	Active	
Zhang Shengmin	张升民	1958	Army and Police	Han	Male	Active	
Zhang Yuzhuo	张玉卓	1962	Central State Organs	Han	Male	Active	
Zhang Qingwei	张庆伟	1961	Hanan	Han	Male	Active	
Zhang Qingli	张庆黎	1951	Sichuan	Han	Male	Active	
Zhang Hongbing	张红兵	1966	Army and Police	Han	Male	Active	
Zhang Hongsen	张宏森	1964	Central State Organs	Han	Male	Active	
Zhang Yupu	张雨浦	1962	Ningxia	Hui	Male	Active	
Zhang Guoqing	张国清	1959	Liaoning	Han	Male	Active	
Zhang Dingyu	张定宇	1963	Hubei	Han	Male	Active	
Zhang Chunxian	张春贤	1953	Jilin	Han	Male	Active	
Zhang Xiaolun	张晓仑	1964	Central Enterprise System	Han	Male	Active	
Zhang Gaoli	张高丽	1946	Invited	Han	Male	Retired	
Zhang Dejiang	张德江	1946	Invited	Han	Male	Retired	
Lu Hao	陆昊	1967	Central State Organs	Han	Male	Active	
Chen Gang	陈刚	1965	Central State Organs	Han	Male	Active	
Chen Xu	陈旭	1962	Central State Organs	Han	Female	Active	
Chen Xi	陈希	1953	Ningxia	Han	Male	Active	
Chen Yixin	陈一新	1959	Central State Organs	Han	Male	Active	
Chen Xiaojiang	陈小江	1962	Central State Organs	Han	Male	Active	
Chen Wenqing	陈文清	1960	Central State Organs	Han	Male	Active	
Chen Siqing	陈四清	1960	Central Financial System	Han	Male	Active	
Chen Jining	陈吉宁	1964	Beijing	Han	Male	Active	
Chen Quanguo	陈全国	1955	Anhui	Han	Male	Active	
Chen Min'er	陈敏尔	1960	Chongqing	Han	Male	Active	
Miao Hua	苗华	1955	Army and Police	Han	Male	Active	
Lin Wu	林武	1962	Shaanxi	Han	Male	Active	
Yi Gang	易纲	1958	Central Financial System	Han	Male	Active	
Yi Huiman	易会满	1964	Central Financial System	Han	Male	Active	
Yi Lianhong	易炼红	1959	Jiangxi	Han	Male	Active	
Luo Gan	罗干	1935	Invited	Han	Male	Retired	
Luo Wen	罗文	—	Sichuan	Han	Male	Active	
Jin Zhuanglong	金壮龙	1964	Central State Organs	Han	Male	Active	
Zhou Qiang	周强	1960	Shandong	Han	Male	Active	
Zhou Changkui	周长奎	1969	Central State Organs	Han	Male	Active	
Zhou Zuyi	周祖翼	1965	Central State Organs	Han	Male	Active	
Zuyi Zheng	郑和	1958	Army and Police	Han	Male	Active	
Zheng Shijie	郑栅洁	1961	Anhui	Han	Male	Active	
Zheng Xincong	郑新聪	1963	Macao	Han	Male	Active	
Meng Xiangfeng	孟祥锋	1964	Central State Organs	Han	Male	Active	
Zhao Leji	赵乐际	1957	Inner Mongolia	Han	Male	Active	
Zhao Zhihao	赵志浩	1931	Shandong	Han	Male	Retired	
Zhao Kezhi	赵克志	1953	Qinghai	Han	Male	Active	
Zhao Xiaozhe	赵晓哲	1963	Army and Police	Han	Male	Active	
Hao Peng	郝鹏	1960	Central Enterprise System	Han	Male	Active	
Hu Cungang	胡存刚	1978	Army and Police	Han	Male	Active	
Hu Heping	胡和平	1962	Central State Organs	Han	Male	Active	
Hu Chunhua	胡春华	1963	Heilongjiang	Han	Male	Active	
Hu Jintao	胡锦涛	1942	Invited	Han	Male	Retired	
Hu Henghua	胡衡华	1963	Chongqing	Han	Male	Active	
Zhong Shaojun	钟绍军	1968	Army and Police	Han	Male	Active	
Xin Changxing	信长星	1963	Qinghai	Han	Male	Active	
Hou Kai	侯凯	1962	Central State Organs	Han	Male	Active	
Hou Jianguo	侯建国	1959	Central State Organs	Han	Male	Active	
Yu Zhengsheng	俞正声	1945	Invited	Han	Male	Retired	
Yu Jianhua	俞建华	1961	Central State Organs	Han	Male	Active	
Jiang Wensheng	姜文盛	1968	Sichuan	Han	Male	Active	
Jiang Zhiguang	姜志光	1961	Central Enterprise System	Han	Male	Active	
Jiang Xinzhi	姜信治	1958	Central State Organs	Han	Male	Active	
He Rong	贺荣	1962	Central State Organs	Han	Female	Active	
He Junke	贺军科	1969	Central State Organs	Han	Male	Active	
He Guoqiang	贺国强	1943	Invited	Han	Male	Retired	
Luo Huining	骆惠宁	1954	Hong Kong	Han	Male	Active	
Qin Shutong	秦树桐	1963	Army and Police	Han	Male	Active	
Yuan Jie	袁洁	1965	Central Enterprise System	Han	Male	Active	
Yuan Huazhi	袁华智	1961	Army and Police	Han	Male	Active	
Yuan Jiajun	袁家军	1962	Zhejiang	Han	Male	Active	
Li Zhanshu	栗战书	1950	Sichuan	Han	Male	Active	
Jia Qinglin	贾庆林	1940	Invited	Han	Male	Retired	
Xia Baolong	夏宝龙	1952	Guangdong	Han	Male	Active	
Tie Ning	铁凝	1957	Central State Organs	Han	Female	Active	
Ni Hong	倪虹	1962	Central State Organs	Han	Male	Active	
Ni Yuefeng	倪岳峰	1964	Hebei	Han	Male	Active	
Xu Lin	徐麟	1963	Central State Organs	Han	Male	Active	
Xu Lejiang	徐乐江	1959	Central State Organs	Han	Male	Active	
Xu Zhongbo	徐忠波	1960	Army and Police	Han	Male	Active	
Xu Deqing	徐德清	1963	Army and Police	Han	Male	Active	
Guo Shengkun	郭声琨	1954	Yunnan	Han	Male	Active	
Guo Shuqing	郭树清	1956	Central Financial System	Han	Male	Active	
Guo Puxiao	郭普校	1964	Army and Police	Han	Male	Active	
Tang Yijun	唐一军	1961	Central State Organs	Han	Male	Active	
Tang Renjian	唐仁健	1962	Central State Organs	Han	Male	Active	
Tang Dengjie	唐登杰	1964	Central State Organs	Han	Male	Active	
Huang Shouhong	黄守宏	1964	Central State Organs	Han	Male	Active	
Huang Zhixian	黄志贤	1956	Taiwan	Han	Male	Active	
Huang Kunming	黄坤明	1956	Jiangxi	Han	Male	Active	
Huang Xiaowei	黄晓薇	1961	Central State Organs	Han	Female	Active	
Cao Jianguo	曹建国	1963	Central Enterprise System	Han	Male	Active	
Cao Jianming	曹建明	1955	Hebei	Han	Male	Active	
Gong Zheng	龚正	1960	Shanghai	Han	Male	Active	
Gong Qihuang	龚旗煌	1964	Beijing	Han	Male	Active	
Zhang Yuzhuo	庹震	1962	Central State Organs	Han	Male	Active	
Liang Yanshun	梁言顺	1962	Ningxia	Han	Male	Active	
Liang Huiling	梁惠玲	1962	Central State Organs	Han	Female	Active	
Shen Yiqin	谌贻琴	1959	Guizhou	Bai	Female	Active	
Han Zheng	韩正	1954	Hainan	Han	Male	Active	
Han Wenxiu	韩文秀	1963	Central State Organs	Han	Male	Active	
Jing Junhai	景俊海	1960	Jilin	Han	Male	Active	
Fu Hua	傅华	1964	Central State Organs	Han	Male	Active	
Fu Guangming	傅光明	1953	Fujian	Han	Male	Active	
Fu Aiguo	傅爱国	—	Army and Police	Han	Male	Active	
Tong Jianming	童建明	1963	Central State Organs	Han	Male	Active	
Zeng Qinghong	曾庆红	1939	Invited	Han	Male	Retired	
Wen Gang	温刚	1966	Central Enterprise System	Han	Male	Active	
Wen Jiabao	温家宝	1942	Invited	Han	Male	Retired	
Xie Chuntao	谢春涛	1963	Central State Organs	Han	Male	Active	
Lan Tianli	蓝天立	1962	Guangxi	Zhuang	Male	Active	
Lou Yangsheng	楼阳生	1959	Henan	Han	Male	Active	
Lei Fanpei	雷凡培	1963	Shanghai	Han	Male	Active	
Shen Haixiong	慎海雄	1967	Central State Organs	Han	Male	Active	
Cai Qi	蔡奇	1955	Beijing	Han	Male	Active	
Cai Jianjiang	蔡剑江	1963	Central State Organs	Han	Male	Active	
Pei Jinjia	裴金佳	1963	Central State Organs	Han	Male	Active	
Tan Chengxu	谭成旭	1963	Liaoning	Han	Male	Active	
Pan Yue	潘岳	1960	Central State Organs	Han	Male	Active	
Mu Hong	穆虹	1956	Central State Organs	Han	Male	Active	
Dai Houliang	戴厚良	1963	Central Enterprise System	Han	Male	Active	
Wei Fenghe	魏凤和	1954	Army and Police	Han	Male	Active	

== See also ==
- 20th National Congress of the Chinese Communist Party
- 20th Central Committee of the Chinese Communist Party
