= Central Leading Group for the Development of the Low-Altitude Economy =

Chinese Communist Party body

- 中央低空经济发展工作领导小组; Zhōngyāng Dīkōng Jīngjì Fāzhǎn Gōngzuò Lǐngdǎo Xiǎozǔ
- Emblem of the Chinese Communist Party

Agency overview
- Formed: January 2025; 1 year ago
- Type: Leading small group
- Jurisdiction: Chinese Communist Party
- Headquarters: Beijing
- Agency executive: Leader
- Parent agency: Central Committee of the Chinese Communist Party

Central Leading Group for the Development of the Low-Altitude Economy
- Simplified Chinese: 中央低空经济发展工作领导小组
Transcriptions
Standard Mandarin
- Hanyu Pinyin: Zhōngyāng Dīkōng Jīngjì Fāzhǎn Gōngzuò Lǐngdǎo Xiǎozǔ

The Central Leading Group for the Development of the Low-Altitude Economy is a coordination body set up under the Central Committee of the Chinese Communist Party for the purpose of the development of the low-altitude economy.

== History ==
In December 2023, the Central Economic Work Conference proposed to "build a number of strategic emerging industries such as bio-manufacturing, commercial aerospace, and low-altitude economy." In March 2024, the second session of the 14th National People’s Congress was held, and "low-altitude economy" was included in the government work report for the first time. In July 2024, the third plenary session of the 20th Central Committee of the Chinese Communist Party was held, and the Resolution on Further Deepening Reform Comprehensively to Advance Chinese Modernization was adopted, proposing to "develop general aviation and low-altitude economy." On 27 December 2024, the Department of Low-Altitude Economic Development of the National Development and Reform Commission was established, which is responsible for drafting and organizing the implementation of the low-altitude economic development strategy and medium- and long-term development plan, proposing relevant policy recommendations, and coordinating relevant major issues.

In January 2025, the Central Leading Group for the Development of Low-Altitude Economy was established. On 26 March 2025, the Office of the Central Leading Group for the Development of Low-Altitude Economy held a meeting. In July 2025, the Civil Aviation Administration of China established a Leading Group for General Aviation and Low-Altitude Economy, stating that it would "establish a coordination relationship with the Central Low-Altitude Office, improve the working mechanism, and coordinate and resolve cross-departmental and cross-central-local issues."
