= He Hongjun =

General in the People's Liberation Army of China

- 何宏军

Deputy Head of the Political Work Department of the Central Military Commission
- In office April 2019 – October 2025
- Head: Miao Hua

Personal details
- Born: August 1961 (age 64) Yang County, Shaanxi, China
- Party: Chinese Communist Party (expelled in 2025)

Military service
- Allegiance: People's Republic of China
- Branch/service: People's Liberation Army Ground Force
- Rank: General

Chinese name
- Simplified Chinese: 何宏军
- Traditional Chinese: 何宏軍
Transcriptions
Standard Mandarin
- Hanyu Pinyin: Hé Hóngjūn

He Hongjun (Chinese: 何宏军; born August 1961) is a general in the People's Liberation Army of China.

He is a delegate to the 13th National People's Congress. He is a member of the 20th Central Committee of the Chinese Communist Party.

== Biography ==
He was born in Yang County, Shaanxi, in August 1961. He served in Xinjiang Military District before being appointed director of the Political Department of the Qinghai Military District in December 2012. He was deputy head of the Cadre Bureau of the People's Liberation Army General Political Department in 2014, in addition to serving as director of the Bureau of Veteran Cadres. He was appointed assistant head of the Political Work Department of the Central Military Commission in 2017, concurrently serving as deputy leader of the Demobilized Army Cadre Emplacement Leading Group of the State Council. He rose to become deputy head of the Political Work Department of the Central Military Commission in April 2019.

He was promoted to the rank of major general (shaojiang) in July 2013, lieutenant general (zhongjiang) in December 2019, and general (shangjiang) in July 2024.

On October 17, 2025, the Ministry of National Defense announced that He was expelled from the CCP and the PLA for "serious violations of discipline and law".

On December 27, 2025, his qualification from being a deputy to the National People's Congress was terminated along with four other military officers including: He Weidong, Wang Peng, Wang Renhua and Zhang Hongbing.
