= 20th Central Committee of the Chinese Communist Party =

2022–present Central Committee

20th Central Committee 中国共产党第二十届中央委员会
- Emblem of the Chinese Communist Party

22 October 2022 – present Overview
- Type: Central Committee of the Chinese Communist Party
- Election: 20th Congress

Leadership
- General Secretary: Xi Jinping
- Politburo Standing Committee: 7 members
- Politburo: 24 members
- Secretariat: 7 members

Members
- Total: 205 members

Alternates
- Total: 171 alternates

Apparatus
- Head of General Office: Cai Qi
- No. of departments: 4 departments

Charter
- Constitution of the Chinese Communist Party

The 20th Central Committee of the Chinese Communist Party (20th CC), officially the Central Committee of the 20th National Congress of the Communist Party of China, comprises 205 members and 171 alternates. It was elected at the Chinese Communist Party (CCP)'s 20th National Congress on 22 October 2022, and its term lasts until the election of the 21st Central Committee at the 21st National Congress, which is planned for 2027. The Central Committee is the party's highest decision-making body in a given period, is not a permanent body, and convenes for an unspecified number of times.

In between sessions of the 20th CC, its powers and responsibilities are delegated to the Politburo, the Politburo Standing Committee and the Central Military Commission (CMC). At its 1st Plenary Session on 22 October, the CC elected the Politburo, Politburo Standing Committee and the CMC. It also endorsed the Politburo Standing Committee's nominees for members of the 20th Secretariat, approved of the composition 20th Central Commission for Discipline Inspection (CCDI) and its Standing Committee and approved the elections of the CCDI secretary and CCDI deputy secretaries.

== Background and composition ==
An analysis by the South China Morning Post found the members of the Politburo Standing Committee collectively had direct links through either career or education, with 226 out of 376 members and alternate member of the Central Committee, up from 131 in the 19th Central Committee. Of the PSC members, Xi Jinping had the most connections with links to 49 members, or around 22 percent of the Politburo Standing Committee links in total, although this was down from the previous Central Committee, where Xi had links with 42 links, which equaled to 32 percent of the PSC total. PSC members Li Qiang, Cai Qi and Li Xi each had wide networks with 39, 42 and 46 connections respectively. Vice Premier and PSC member Ding Xuexiang had connections to 15 officials, while Zhao Leji and Wang Huning, who were members of the previous Politburo Standing Committee, respectively increased their links from 12 to 21 and seven to 15. The Post commented this meant Xi would be "relying more on his deputies to build rapport with those in power at the lower level".

According to The Economist, the 20th Central Committee contains a historically low number of princelings, with 10 of them as members, compared to 41 during the 18th Central Committee. The number further declined to 9 with the expelling of Li Shangfu from the Central Committee in 2023. The number of princelings in the PSC has similarly declined; four out of seven members of the 18th Politburo Standing Committee were princelings, compared to only one, Xi Jinping, in the 20th Politburo Standing Committee. The number of princelings in the leadership further declined with the investigation on Zhang Youxia in 2026, leaving Xi as the only princeling in the Politburo.

== Convocations ==
=== 1st Plenary Session (23 October 2022) ===
The first plenum was convened on October 23, 2022, immediately after the closing of the 20th National Congress of the Chinese Communist Party. The following were elected during the session: the General Secretary, the Politburo Standing Committee, and the Politburo. Members of the Secretariat were authorized on the basis of nominations from the Standing Committee of the Politburo, and the Central Military Commission's composition was determined. The election of the Secretary, Deputy Secretaries, and members of the Politburo Standing Committee, as selected in the first plenary session of the 20th Central Commission for Discipline Inspection, was also ratified during the session.

The CCP general secretary, Xi Jinping, was re-elected at the session.

Election Results:

- General Secretary of the Central Committee: Xi Jinping
- Members of the Standing Committee of the Politburo: Xi Jinping, Li Qiang, Zhao Leji, Wang Huning, Cai Qi, Ding Xuexiang, Li Xi
- Members of the Politburo (listed in stroke order of surnames): Ding Xuexiang, Xi Jinping, Ma Xingrui, Wang Yi, Wang Huning, Yin Li, Shi Taifeng, Liu Guozhong, Li Xi, Li Qiang, Li Ganjie, Li Shulei, Li Hongzhong, He Weidong, He Lifeng, Zhang Youxia, Zhang Guoqing, Chen Wenqing, Chen Jining, Chen Min'er, Zhao Leji, Yuan Jiajun, Huang Kunming, Cai Qi

Approved:

- Secretaries of the Secretariat: Cai Qi, Shi Taifeng, Li Ganjie, Li Shulei, Chen Wenqing, Liu Jinguo, Wang Xiaohong

Decided:

- Central Military Commission
- Chairman: Xi Jinping
- Vice Chairmen: Zhang Youxia, He Weidong
- Members: Li Shangfu (expelled from the CCP in June 2024, naturally removed from the commission), Liu Zhenli, Miao Hua, Zhang Shengmin

Approved:

- 20th Central Commission for Discipline Inspection
- Secretary: Li Xi
- Deputy Secretaries: Liu Jinguo, Zhang Shengmin, Xiao Pei, Yu Hongqiu, Fu Kui, Sun Xinyang, Liu Xuexin, Zhang Fuhai
- Standing Committee Members (listed in stroke order of surnames): Wang Xiaoping, Wang Aiwen, Wang Hongjin, Liu Jinguo, Liu Xuexin, Xu Luode, Sun Xinyang, Li Xi, Li Xinran, Xiao Pei, Zhang Shengmin, Zhang Fuhai, Chen Guoqiang, Zhao Shiyong, Hou Kai, Yin Bai, Yu Hongqiu, Fu Kui, Mu Hongyu

=== 2nd Plenary Session (26–28 February 2023) ===
The second plenary was held in Beijing from 26 to 28 February 2023.

The Politburo of the Chinese Communist Party entrusted CCP general secretary Xi Jinping with the responsibility of delivering the work report, which was presented and deliberated during the session.

The plenum reviewed and approved the proposed list of candidates for state leadership positions to be recommended to the 1st Session of the 14th National People's Congress (NPC), as well as the list of candidates for the leadership of the Chinese People's Political Consultative Conference (CPPCC) to be recommended to the First Session of the 14th CPPCC National Committee. These two lists were determined to be transmitted to the praesidium of the First Session of the 14th NPC and the praesidium of the First Session of the 14th CPPCC National Committee, respectively.

The plenum also examined and approved the "Plan for Reforming Party and State Institutions" and agreed to submit portions of the plan for deliberation at the 1st Session of the 14th NPC in accordance with legal procedures. The plenum was presented with an explication of the "Draft Plan for Reforming Party and State Institutions" by Xi Jinping during the meeting.

=== 3rd Plenary Session (15–18 July 2024) ===
The third plenary was conducted in Beijing from 15 to 18 July 2024. During the meeting, CCP General Secretary Xi Jinping presented a work report of the 20th Central Committee on behalf of the Politburo. The session reviewed an approved the Resolution on Further Deepening Reform Comprehensively to Advance Chinese Modernization, which outlined China's economic reform goals from 2024 to 2029. The plenum also approved several personnel decisions, including expelling several military members of the Central Committee due to disciplinary violations.

The third plenary session of the Central Committee of the Chinese Communist Party is typically convened between September and December of the year following the Party Congress, as per previous practice. Nevertheless, this session was held in July 2024. According to certain analysts, the postponement may be attributable to the necessity for additional time to coordinate and develop significant reform strategies. However, this meeting continued to emphasize economic and reform concerns, as has been the case in previous third plenary sessions.

On 20 May 2024, the CCP Central Committee convened a symposium at Zhongnanhai to gather input and recommendations from non-CCP members regarding the Central Committee's decision to intensify reforms and promote Chinese modernization. Xi Jinping, the General Secretary of the Chinese Communist Party, presided over the symposium and delivered a significant address. The meeting was attended by Wang Huning, Cai Qi, and Ding Xuexiang, members of the Politburo Standing Committee. Speeches were given by Chairman Zheng Jianbang of the Revolutionary Committee of the Chinese Kuomintang (RCCK), Chairman Ding Zhongli of the China Democratic League (CDL), Chairman Hao Mingjin of the China National Democratic Construction Association (CNDCA), Chairman Cai Dafeng of the China Association for Promoting Democracy (CAPD), Chairman He Wei of the Chinese Peasants' and Workers' Democratic Party (CPWDP), Chairman Jiang Zuojun of the China Zhi Gong Party (CZGP), Chairman Wu Weihua of the Jiusan Society, Chairwoman Su Hui of the Taiwan Democratic Self-Government League (TDSL), Chairman Gao Yunlong of the All-China Federation of Industry and Commerce (ACFIC), and non-CCP representative Piao Shilong.

The plenum was conducted in Beijing from 15 to 18 July 2024. During the plenum, Xi Jinping presented a work report to the 20th Central Committee on behalf of the Politburo, focusing on further deepening reforms and advancing Chinese-style modernization. The plenum heard and debated the work report presented by Xi on behalf of the Politburo. The plenum also reviewed and approving the Resolution of the CCP Central Committee on Further Deepening Reform Comprehensively to Advance Chinese Modernization, with Xi explaining the Resolution to the plenary session.

Regarding economics, the resolution said they must "better leverage the role of the market" and "make resource allocation as efficient and productive as possible", calling on to "lift restrictions on the market" while ensuring effective regulation" and "strive to better maintain order in the market and remedy market failures". The resolution also highlighted efforts in "building a unified national market". The resolution also focused heavily on "deepening the reform of the fiscal system, deepening financial system reform, and improving the mechanism for implementing the regional coordinated development strategy," referring to the financial and fiscal sectors as "key areas." The communique of the plenum stated all the reform tasks laid out in the resolution would be completed by the 80th anniversary of the People's Republic of China in 2029.

Following the CCP Constitution, the plenary session agreed to replace alternate members of the Central Committee Ding Xiangqun, Yu Lijun, and Yu Jihong to members. The plenary session also agreed to remove Qin Gang from the Central Committee by accepting his appeal for resignation. The plenary session reviewed and approved the CCP Central Military Commission on the investigation of the issues of significant disciplinary violations by Li Shangfu, Li Yuchao, and Sun Jinming and confirmed the disciplinary actions previously taken by the Politburo in dismissing Li Shangfu, Li Yuchao, and Sun Jinming from the Party.

Following the conferences, early on July 19 at 10 a.m., the CCP Central Committee convened a news conference to present and explain the decisions of the third plenary session. Li Qiang, Zhao Leji, Wang Huning, and Li Xi respectively oversaw the State Council Executive Meeting and Party Leadership Group Meeting, the Party Leadership Group Meeting of the Standing Committee of the National People's Congress, the Party Leadership Group Meeting of the Chinese People's Political Consultative Conference, and the Standing Committee Meeting of the Central Commission for Discipline Inspection, in order to transmit and analyze the of third plenary session.

Along with the complete text of Xi Jinping's justifications of the decisions presented to the assembly, the "Decision of the CCP Central Committee on Further Deepening Reform and Advancing Chinese-Style Modernizing" was published on July 21, 2024. Emphasizing voluntariness and flexibility, it discussed the slow and orderly advancement of the reform to progressively postpone the statutory retirement age.

=== 4th Plenary Session (20–23 October 2025) ===
The fourth plenum took place in Beijing 20 to 23 October 2025. The main agenda of the meeting included the Politburo reporting to the Central Committee on its work and the study of proposals on formulating the 15th Five-Year Plan. Personnel changes were also made. The CCP Central Committee's fourth plenary session has generally been used to launch China's 15th Five-Year Plan. It was attended by approximately 200 voting members and 170 alternate members of the Central Committee of the Chinese Communist Party.

On the morning of October 20, 2025, the fourth plenary session was held in Beijing. CCP General Secretary Xi Jinping delivered a work report to the plenary session on behalf of the Politburo and explained to the plenary session the "Proposal of the CCP Central Committee on Formulating the 15th Five-Year Plan for National Economic and Social Development (Draft for Discussion)". Details were not released. It was anticipated then that some (such as personnel changes) would not be announced for days, weeks, or months, the rubber stamp National People's Congress session of March 2026 being the formal occasion of its public promulgation.

In the event, numerous personnel changes were confirmed in a 5,000-word communiqué issued at the conclusion of the plenum. Zhang Shengmin was added as a vice chairman of the CCP Central Military Commission (CMC), the second highest position in the military hierarchy, replacing He Weidong, who had been purged only the week before. Empty seats of the Central Committee of the CCP were filled by the alternate members Deng Xiuming, Deng Yiwu, Lu Hong, Ma Hancheng, Wang Jian, Wang Tingkai, Wang Xi, Wang Xinwei, Wang Yonghong, Wei Tao, and Yu Huiwen. Hence 11 members of that body were replaced in the aftermath of the anti-corruption campaign, the highest turnover since 2017.

Notably, national defense capability was included for the first time in a Five Year Plan. Furthermore, some investigations had not heretofore been announced, and only 82% of Central Committee members were in attendance. Out of 205 members, 168 attended the meeting, the communique said, along with 147 out of 171 alternates, itself the lowest attendance since the Cultural Revolution. Institutionally, the seven-seat Central Military Commission (CMC) now has only four serving members.

=== 5th Plenary Session (26–29 October 2026) ===
The fifth plenum took place in Beijing 26 to 29 October 2026. 162 members and 117 alternate members of the Central Committee were attended the session. It was the lowest attendance on record in the post-Mao Zedong period. At the session, the Central Committee deliberated and adopted the Resolution of the Central Committee of the Communist Party of China on Certain Major Issues concerning Persevering with Full and Rigorous Party Self-Governance. The session also decided that the 21st National Congress of the Chinese Communist Party would be held in the second half of 2027. The Resolution was written by a drafting group led by Xi, with Wang Huning, Cai Qi and Li Xi being members of the group. It began work in February 2026.

Zhang Shengmin was promoted to the member of the 20th Politburo of the Chinese Communist Party. 10 alternates of the Central Committee were promoted to members: Lu Dongliang, Bao Gang, Xing Shanping, Qu Yingpu, Lü Jun, Zhu Tianshu, Zhu Guoxian, Liu Jun, Liu Jie, and Liu Qiang. 33 members (including alternates) of the Central Committee were expelled, including 16 military officials, setting another record. The plenary session reviewed and approved the reports by the Central Commission on Discipline Inspection on Ma Xingrui, Lan Tianli, Liu Jianchao, Wang Lixia, Jin Zhuanglong, Lei Fanpei, Yi Huiman, Wang Xiangxi, Sun Shaocheng, Fei Dongbin, Wu Shenghua, Yu Jianfeng, Yuan Jie, Zhang Zhongyang, Wen Gang, Jin Donghan and Fang Hongwei, and the reports by the CCP Central Military Commission on Zhang Youxia, Liu Zhenli, Wang Renhua, Liu Qingsong, Huang Ming, Li Qiaoming, Li Wei, Zhang Hongbing, Wang Haijiang, Zhang Lin, Wang Peng, Liu Faqing, Yang Cheng, Zhong Shaojun, Zhao Xiaozhe and Fang Yongxiang regarding their investigations on the issues of significant disciplinary violations, and expelled them from the CCP. In addition, Li Yunze was stripped of his posts in the CCP. The majority of the expulsions were tied to the national defense apparatus and affected the People's Liberation Army Ground Force more than other branches of the military.

== See also ==
- Presidium of the 20th National Congress of the Chinese Communist Party
