= Zhao Shi =

Zhao Shi may refer to:

- Emperor Duanzong of Song, also known as Zhao Shi (趙昰)
- Trọng Thủy, also known as Zhao Shi (赵始)
- Zhao Shi (footballer), Chinese footballer
- Zhao Shi (politician), a Central Committee member
