= Wei Yiyin =

Chinese space scientist (born 1962)

- 魏毅寅
- Born: September 1962 (age 63–64); Tai'an County, Liaoning, China
- Education: Harbin Institute of Technology
- Scientific career
- Fields: Aerospace
- Workplaces: China Aerospace Science and Industry Corporation

Wei Yiyin (Chinese: 魏毅寅; pinyin: Wèi Yìyǐn; born September 1962) is a Chinese space scientist currently serving as deputy general manager of the China Aerospace Science and Industry Corporation. He is a member of the Chinese Society of Astronautics (CSA).

== Biography ==
Wei was born in Tai'an County, Liaoning, in September 1962. He obtained his Doctor of Engineering degree from Harbin Institute of Technology.

He entered the workforce in August 1984, and joined the Chinese Communist Party in December 1995. He a member of the 12th National Committee of the Chinese People's Political Consultative Conference.

== Honors and awards ==
- 2013 Fellow of the International Academy of Astronautics (IAA)
- June 2018 Guanghua Engineering Science and Technology Award
- November 2018 Engineering Construction Technology Award of the Ho Leung Ho Lee Foundation
- November 22, 2019 Member of the Chinese Academy of Engineering (CAE)
