= Li Yunze =

Chinese politician

- 李云泽
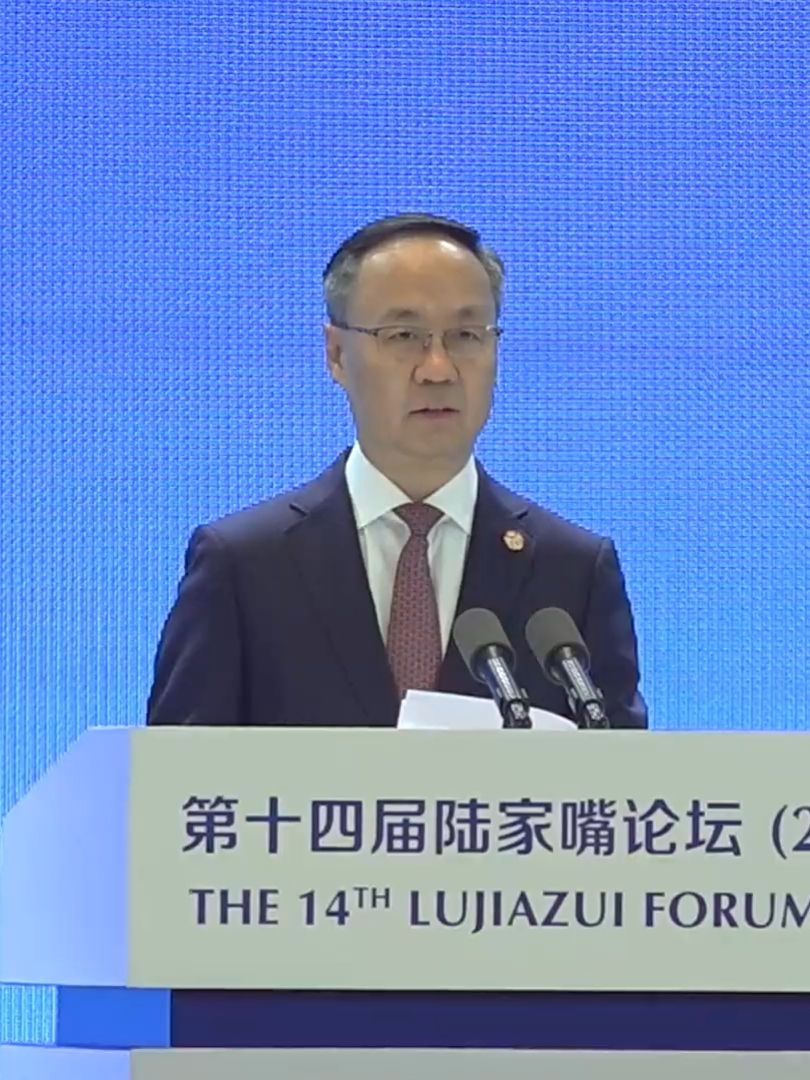
- Li Yunze in 2023

Director of the National Financial Regulatory Administration
- In office 19 May 2023 – 29 April 2026
- Premier: Li Qiang
- Preceded by: Office established (Guo Shuqing as Chairman of CBIRC)
- Succeeded by: Ding Xiangqun

Executive Vice Governor of Sichuan
- In office May 2022 – 25 May 2023
- Governor: Huang Qiang
- Preceded by: Luo Wen
- Succeeded by: Dong Weimin

Personal details
- Born: September 1970 (age 56) Yantai, Shandong, China
- Party: Chinese Communist Party
- Education: Tianjin University; Peking University; Graduate School of Chinese Academy of Social Sciences

Chinese name
- Simplified Chinese: 李云泽
- Traditional Chinese: 李雲澤
Transcriptions
Standard Mandarin
- Hanyu Pinyin: Lǐ Yúnzé

Li Yunze (Chinese: 李云泽; born September 1970) is a Chinese state banker and politician. He served as a vice governor of Sichuan from 2018 to 2023, and the director of the National Administration of Financial Regulation from 2023 to 2026. In 2026, Li was stripped of his posts in the Chinese Communist Party.

== Biography ==
Li was born in Yantai, Shandong, in September 1970. In 1989, he entered Tianjin University, where he majored in infrastructure management and Marxism. He also received his MBA from Peking University in 2010 and a Ph.D. in economics from the Graduate School of the Chinese Academy of Social Sciences in August 2016.

After attending university in 1993, Li was assigned to the Tianjin Heping Branch of the People's Construction Bank of China (now China Construction Bank). He joined the Chinese Communist Party in May 2001. He was named an assistant governor of the Tianjin Branch in September 2003. He moved up the ranks to become vice governor in June 2005 — and governor in March 2015 — of the Chongqing Branch of China Construction Bank. In June 2017, he was moved to the Industrial and Commercial Bank of China and was appointed as a vice governor of the bank.

He was appointed vice governor of Sichuan in September 2018. In May 2021, he was admitted to the Standing Committee of the CCP Sichuan Provincial Committee, the province's top authority. In May 2022, he was appointed executive vice governor of Sichuan.

He was a representative of the 20th National Congress of the Chinese Communist Party and an is an alternate of the 20th Central Committee of the Chinese Communist Party.

On 10 May 2023, Li was appointed as the Communist Party Secretary of the National Administration of Financial Regulation (NAFR), China's new top financial regulator. On 19 May, he was appointed as its director. He is the first ministerial-level leader born in the 1970s.

=== Downfall ===
On 29 April 2026, Li was demoted for alleged "serious violations of discipline", and will be given a mid-level position at the financial regulator reportedly. On 26 June 2026, the Standing Committee of the National People's Congress removed Li as a delegate to the 14th National People's Congress. On 29 October 2026, the fifth plenary session of the 20th CCP Central Committee confirmed that Li was stripped of his posts in the CCP.

Government offices
Preceded by Office established (Guo Shuqing as Chairman of China Banking and Insurance Regulatory Commission)	Director of the National Administration of Financial Regulation; 2023–2026	Succeeded by Ding Xiangqun
Preceded by Luo Wen	Executive Vice Governor of Sichuan; 2022–2023	Succeeded by Dong Weimin
