= Qu Yingpu =

Chinese editor, executive and politician (born 1965)

- 曲莹璞
- Born: 1965 (age 60–61); Tanghe County, Henan, China
- Education: Shanghai International Studies University; Harvard University
- Occupations: Editor, executive, politician
- Years active: 1987–present
- Agent: China Daily
- Political party: Chinese Communist Party

Chinese name
- Simplified Chinese: 曲莹璞
- Traditional Chinese: 曲瑩璞
Transcriptions
Standard Mandarin
- Hanyu Pinyin: Qǔ Yíngpú

Qu Yingpu (Chinese: 曲莹璞; born 1965) is a Chinese editor, executive and politician, currently serving as chief editor and president of China Daily.

He is a representative of the 20th National Congress of the Chinese Communist Party and a member of the 20th Central Committee of the Chinese Communist Party.

== Biography ==
Qu was born in Tanghe County, Henan, in 1965. He successively obtained a bachelor's degree in English language and literature and a bachelor's degree in international journalism from Shanghai International Studies University, and received a master's degree in public administration from Harvard University.

Beginning in 1987, he served in several posts in China Daily, including deputy director of the Economic News Department, director of the Chief Editor's Office, assistant chief editor, chief editor of the Hong Kong Edition of China Daily, and deputy chief editor of China Daily. He rose to become chief editor and president of China Daily in April 2022.

On 29 October 2026, at the fifth plenary session of the 20th CCP Central Committee, he was elected as a member of the Central Committee.

Media offices
Preceded by Zhou Shuchun	Chief Editor and President of China Daily; 2022–	Incumbent
