= Liu Junchen =

Chinese politician

- 刘俊臣

Executive Deputy Secretary-General of the National People's Congress
- Incumbent
- Assumed office July 2022
- Preceded by: Xin Chunying

Personal details
- Born: May 1963 (age 63) Shangcai County, Henan, China
- Party: Chinese Communist Party
- Education: Zhengzhou University; Jilin University; Renmin University of China

Chinese name
- Simplified Chinese: 刘俊臣
- Traditional Chinese: 劉俊臣
Transcriptions
Standard Mandarin
- Hanyu Pinyin: Liú Jùnchén

Liu Junchen (Chinese: 刘俊臣; born May 1963) is a Chinese politician who is the current executive deputy secretary-general of the National People's Congress, in office since July 2022.

He was a representative of the 19th National Congress of the Chinese Communist Party. He is a representative of the 20th National Congress of the Chinese Communist Party and a member of the 20th Central Committee of the Chinese Communist Party.

== Biography ==
Liu was born in Shangcai County, Henan, in May 1963. After taking the college entrance examination in 1979, he attended Zhengzhou University where he received his bachelor's degree in law in 1983. He went on to receive his master's degree in law from Jilin University in 1986 and obtained his doctor's degree in law from Renmin University of China in 2002. He joined the Chinese Communist Party (CCP) in May 1985, nearing graduation.

After university in 1986, Liu was despatched to the State Administration for Industry and Commerce, where he assumed various posts.

In November 2010, Liu was transferred to north China's Inner Mongolia and appointed governor and deputy party secretary of Xilingol League.

In May 2013, Liu was recalled to the State Administration for Industry and Commerce and appointed deputy director.

In March 2018, Liu became a member of the State Administration for Market Regulation, concurrently serving as party branch secretary and deputy director of the State Intellectual Property Office.

Liu was chosen as vice chairperson of the National People's Congress Legislative Affairs Committee in October 2018, and was made deputy secretary-general of the National People's Congress two years later.

Government offices
Preceded by Zhang Guohua	Governor of Xilingol League. 2010–2013	Succeeded by Zhang Yuanzhong
Assembly seats
Preceded by Xin Chunying	Executive Deputy Secretary-General of the National People's Congress; 2022–	Incumbent
