= Zhang Zhongyang =

Chinese entrepreneur and politician

- 张忠阳
- Born: October 1970 (age 56); Liuyang County, Hunan, China
- Education: National University of Defense Technology
- Occupations: Executive, politician
- Years active: 1995–2026
- Agent: China Aerospace Science and Technology Corporation
- Political party: Chinese Communist Party (expelled in 2026)

Chinese name
- Simplified Chinese: 张忠阳
- Traditional Chinese: 張忠陽
Transcriptions
Standard Mandarin
- Hanyu Pinyin: Zhāng Zhōngyáng

Zhang Zhongyang (Chinese: 张忠阳; born October 1970) is a Chinese executive and politician, who served as general manager of the China Aerospace Science and Technology Corporation.

He was an alternate of the 20th Central Committee of the Chinese Communist Party. He was a member of the 13th National Committee of the Chinese People's Political Consultative Conference. In October 2026, Zhang was expelled from the Chinese Communist Party.

== Biography ==
Zhang was born in Liuyang County (now Liuyang), Hunan, in October 1970. In 1988, he was accepted to the National University of Defense Technology, where he majored in aerodynamics. He joined the Chinese Communist Party (CCP) in December 1999.

After university in 1992, Zhang was assigned to the China National Aerospace Corporation, which was reshuffled as the China Aerospace Science and Industry Corporation in March 2005. In September 2018, he became deputy general manager, rising to general manager in February 2022.

On 29 October 2026, the fifth plenary session of the 20th CCP Central Committee reviewed and approved the report of the Central Commission for Discipline Inspection on the "serious violations of discipline and law" by Zhang and confirmed the Politburo decision to expel him from the CCP.

Business positions
Preceded by Xu Qiang (徐强)	General Manager the China Aerospace Science and Industry Corporation; 2022–	Incumbent
