= Yu Jihong =

Chinese chemist

- 于吉红

President of Beijing Normal University
- Incumbent
- Assumed office 30 April 2024
- Preceded by: Ma Jun

Personal details
- Born: January 1967 (age 58) Anshan, Liaoning, China
- Party: Chinese Communist Party
- Education: Jilin University (BS, MS, PhD)
- Scientific career
- Fields: Inorganic materials
- Institutions: Jilin University

Chinese name
- Simplified Chinese: 于吉红
- Traditional Chinese: 于吉紅
Transcriptions
Standard Mandarin
- Hanyu Pinyin: Yú Jíhóng

Yu Jihong (Chinese: 于吉红; born January 1967) is a Chinese chemist and politician who is a professor at Jilin University, and an academician of the Chinese Academy of Sciences.

Yu was a delegate to the 20th National Congress of the Chinese Communist Party and serves as a member of the 20th Central Committee of the Chinese Communist Party.

== Biography ==
Yu was born in Anshan, Liaoning, in January 1967, while her ancestral home in Feicheng, Shandong. She earned a bachelor's degree in 1989, a master's degree in 1992, and a doctor's degree in 1995, all in chemistry and all from Jilin University. She was a postdoctoral fellow at the Hong Kong University of Science and Technology from 1996 to 1997 and Tohoku University from 1997 to 1998.

Starting 1995, she worked at Jilin University, where she was promoted to associate professor in 1997 and to full professor in 1999.

On 30 April 2024, she rose to become president of Beijing Normal University, a position at vice-ministerial level. In October 2022, she was elected as an alternate of the 20th Central Committee of the Chinese Communist Party. In July 2024, the 3rd plenary session of the 20th Central Committee promoted her as a member of the Central Committee.

== Honors and awards ==
- November 2016 Fellow of The World Academy of Sciences (TWAS)
- July 2019 Foreign Member of the Acadamia Europaea
- 2021 Foreign Member of the Royal Swedish Academy of Sciences

Educational offices
Preceded by Ma Jun	President of Beijing Normal University; 2024–present	Incumbent
