= Wang Jian (politician, born 1965) =

Chinese politician (born 1965)

- 王健

Executive Vice Governor of Liaoning
- Incumbent
- Assumed office January 2022
- Governor: Li Lecheng
- Preceded by: Chen Xiangqun

Personal details
- Born: September 1965 (age 61) China
- Party: Chinese Communist Party
- Education: Shenyang University of Technology

Wang Jian (Chinese: 王健; pinyin: Wáng Jiàn; born September 1965) is a Chinese politician, currently serving as executive vice governor of Liaoning.

He is a delegate to the 14th National People's Congress and an alternate of the 20th Central Committee of the Chinese Communist Party.

== Early life and education ==
Born in September 1965, Wang graduated from the Shenyang University of Technology in 1988.

== Career in Liaoning ==
Wang joined the Chinese Communist Party (CCP) in November 1985, and entered the workforce in August 1988. He joined the Shenyang Institute of Science and Technology after university, and was elevated to Shenyang Bearing Material Research Institute in May 1993.

He got involved in politics in May 1995, when he was appointed an official in the Shenyang Municipal Science and Technology Bureau. In Shenyang, he was in turn deputy party secretary of Shenbei New Area in July 2004, deputy party secretary and governor of Sujiatun District in November 2006, deputy party secretary and governor of Dadong District in December 2010, party secretary of Dadong District in February 2013, and party secretary of Hunnan District in July 2016. In October 2016, he was admitted to member of the CCP Shenyang Municipal Committee, the city's top authority, and was made secretary of the Political and Legal Affairs Commission the next month.

He was appointed party secretary of Huludao in August 2018, concurrently serving as chairman of the People's Congress.

In September 2020, he was admitted to member of the CCP Liaoning Provincial Committee, the province's top authority, and became secretary-general in March 2021. In January 2022, he was chosen as executive vice governor of Liaoning, succeeding Chen Xiangqun.

Party political offices
Preceded by Sun Yi	Communist Party Secretary of Huludao; 2018–2021	Succeeded by Wang Danan
Preceded by Liu Huanxin	Secretary-General of the Liaoning Provincial Committee of the Chinese Communist Party; 2020–2021	Succeeded by Zhang Chengzhong
Government offices
Preceded by Chen Xiangqun	Executive Vice Governor of Liaoning; 2022–present	Incumbent
