= Ding Xiangqun =

Chinese economist and politician

- 丁向群

Director of the National Financial Regulatory Administration
- Incumbent
- Assumed office 5 June 2026
- Premier: Li Qiang
- Preceded by: Li Yunze

Communist Party Secretary of the People's Insurance Company of China
- In office 22 October 2024 – 29 May 2026
- Preceded by: Wang Tingke
- Succeeded by: Vacant

Head of the Organization Department of the Anhui Provincial Committee of the Chinese Communist Party
- In office September 2018 – 22 October 2024
- Preceded by: Huang Shiyong
- Succeeded by: Sun Hongmei

Personal details
- Born: June 1965 (age 61) Huaiyin Special District, Jiangsu, China
- Party: Chinese Communist Party
- Education: Renmin University of China

Ding Xiangqun (Chinese: 丁向群; pinyin: Dīng Xiàngqún; born June 1965) is a Chinese economist and politician, currently serving as the director of the National Financial Regulatory Administration. She previously served as the party secretary of People's Insurance Company of China, the head of the Organization Department of the CCP Anhui Provincial Committee, vice chairwoman of Guangxi and before that, and vice governor of the China Development Bank.

Ding is a representative of the 20th National Congress of the Chinese Communist Party and a member of the 20th Central Committee of the Chinese Communist Party.

== Biography ==
Ding was born in Huaiyin Special District (now Huai'an), Jiangsu, in June 1965. In 1983, she entered the Renmin University of China, where she majored in economic management.

After graduating in 1987, she was assigned to the Agricultural Bank of China. In August 1993, she was transferred to the Bank of China, where she stayed for almost 20 years. She joined the Chinese Communist Party (CCP) in May 1999. In January 2013, she became deputy general manager of China Taiping Insurance Group, but having held the position for only two and a half years. In July 2015, she was promoted to vice governor of the China Development Bank.

Ding began her political career in June 2017, when she was appointed vice chairwoman of Guangxi.

Ding was appointed head of the Organization Department of the CCP Anhui Provincial Committee in September 2018 and was admitted to member of the Standing Committee of the CCP Anhui Provincial Committee, the province's top authority.

In October 2022, she was elected as an alternate of the 20th Central Committee of the Chinese Communist Party. In July 2024, the 3rd plenary session of the 20th CCP Central Committee confirmed the promoted her as a member of the Central Committee.

On 18 July 2024, she became a member of the 20th Central Committee of the Chinese Communist Party. In October 2024, she was appointed party secretary of the People's Insurance Company of China, succeeding Wang Tingke.

On 29 May 2026, Ding was appointed as the party secretary of the National Financial Regulatory Administration, succeeding Li Yunze. On 5 June, she was appointed as the director.

Party political offices
Preceded by Yan Zhichan	Head of the Organization Department of the Anhui Provincial Committee of the Chinese Communist Party; 2018–2024	Succeeded by Sun Hongmei
Preceded by Wang Tingke	Communist Party Secretary of the People's Insurance Company of China; 2024–2026	Vacant
Government offices
Preceded by Li Yunze	Director of the National Financial Regulatory Administration; 2026–	Incumbent
