= Deng Yiwu =

Chinese executive and politician

- 邓亦武

Chairman of the China Grain Reserves Corporation
- Incumbent
- Assumed office January 2019

Personal details
- Born: October 1965 (age 60–61) You County, Hunan, China
- Party: Chinese Communist Party
- Education: Hunan Grain School; Central University of Finance and Economics

Chinese name
- Simplified Chinese: 邓亦武
- Traditional Chinese: 鄧亦武
Transcriptions
Standard Mandarin
- Hanyu Pinyin: Dèng Yìwǔ

Deng Yiwu (Chinese: 邓亦武; born October 1965) is a Chinese executive and politician, currently serving as chairman and party branch secretary of China Grain Reserves Corporation.

He is an alternate of the 20th Central Committee of the Chinese Communist Party.

== Biography ==
Deng was born in You County, Hunan, in October 1965. In 1981, he entered Hunan Grain School, where he majored in accounting. After graduating in 1983, he became an accountant in Xiangtan Grain and Oil Machinery Factory. He joined the Chinese Communist Party (CCP) in March 1986. He did his postgraduate work at the Central Institute of Finance and Banking (now Central University of Finance and Economics) from 1988 to 1991.

Deng got involved in politics in February 1991, when he was appointed an official in the Department of Finance and Price, Ministry of Commerce. In October 1993, he was assigned to the State Grain Reserve Administration, where he eventually becoming director of the Department of Finance in November 2005.

In July 2011, Deng was transferred to northeast China's Jilin province and appointed party secretary of Shuangliao, in addition to serving as vice mayor of Siping. In January 2014, he was made party secretary of Jilin Radio and television University, a post he kept until September 2015.

After three months as director of the China Grain Research and Training Center, in November 2015, he was chosen as deputy director of the State Administration of Grain. In September 2016, he became general manager of the China Grain Reserves Corporation, rising to chairman and party branch secretary in January 2019.
