= An Zhaoqing =

Chinese general

- 安兆庆

Political Commissar of the People's Armed Police
- In office April 2019 – January 2022
- Preceded by: Zhu Shengling
- Succeeded by: Zhang Hongbing

Personal details
- Born: May 1957 (age 68) Lanxi County, Heilongjiang, China
- Party: Chinese Communist Party

Military service
- Allegiance: People's Republic of China
- Branch/service: People's Liberation Army Air Force; People's Armed Police
- Years of service: ?–2022
- Rank: General

Chinese name
- Simplified Chinese: 安兆庆
- Traditional Chinese: 安兆慶
Transcriptions
Standard Mandarin
- Hanyu Pinyin: ān Zhàoqìng

An Zhaoqing (Chinese: 安兆庆; born May 1957) is a retired general in the People's Liberation Army (PLA) of China who served as political commissar of the People's Armed Police from 2019 to 2022. He is a representative of the 19th National Congress of the Chinese Communist Party. He is a member of the 19th Central Committee of the Chinese Communist Party. He is a delegate to the 13th National People's Congress.

== Biography ==
An was born into a Sibe family in Lanxi County, Heilongjiang, in May 1957. He served in the Air Force of Shenyang Military Region for a long time before being appointed deputy director of its Political Department in 2009. He rose to become director of the Political Department of the Air Force of Nanjing Military Region in 2013 and one year later become deputy political commissar of Guangzhou Military Region and political commissar of the Air Force of Guangzhou Military Region (later reshuffled as Southern Theater Command Air Force). In December 2016, he was appointed political commissar of the Equipment Development Department of the Central Military Commission, he remained in that position until April 2019, when he was commissioned as political commissar of the People's Armed Police.

He was promoted to the rank of major general (shaojiang) in July 2009, lieutenant general (zhongjiang) in July 2016, and general (shangjiang) in July 2019.

Military offices
| Preceded by Hu Xiutang | Political Commissar of the Air Force of Guangzhou Military Region; 2014–2015 | Succeeded by Position revoked |
| New title | Political Commissar of the Southern Theater Command Air Force; 2016–2017 | Succeeded by Xu Xisheng |
| Preceded by Wang Hongyao | Political Commissar of the Equipment Development Department of the Central Military Commission; 2017–2019 | Succeeded by TBA |
| Preceded by Zhu Shengling | Political Commissar of the People's Armed Police; 2019–2022 | Succeeded by Zhang Hongbing |
