= National Financial Regulatory Administration =

Chinese financial regulatory body

- 国家金融监督管理总局
- National Emblem of China

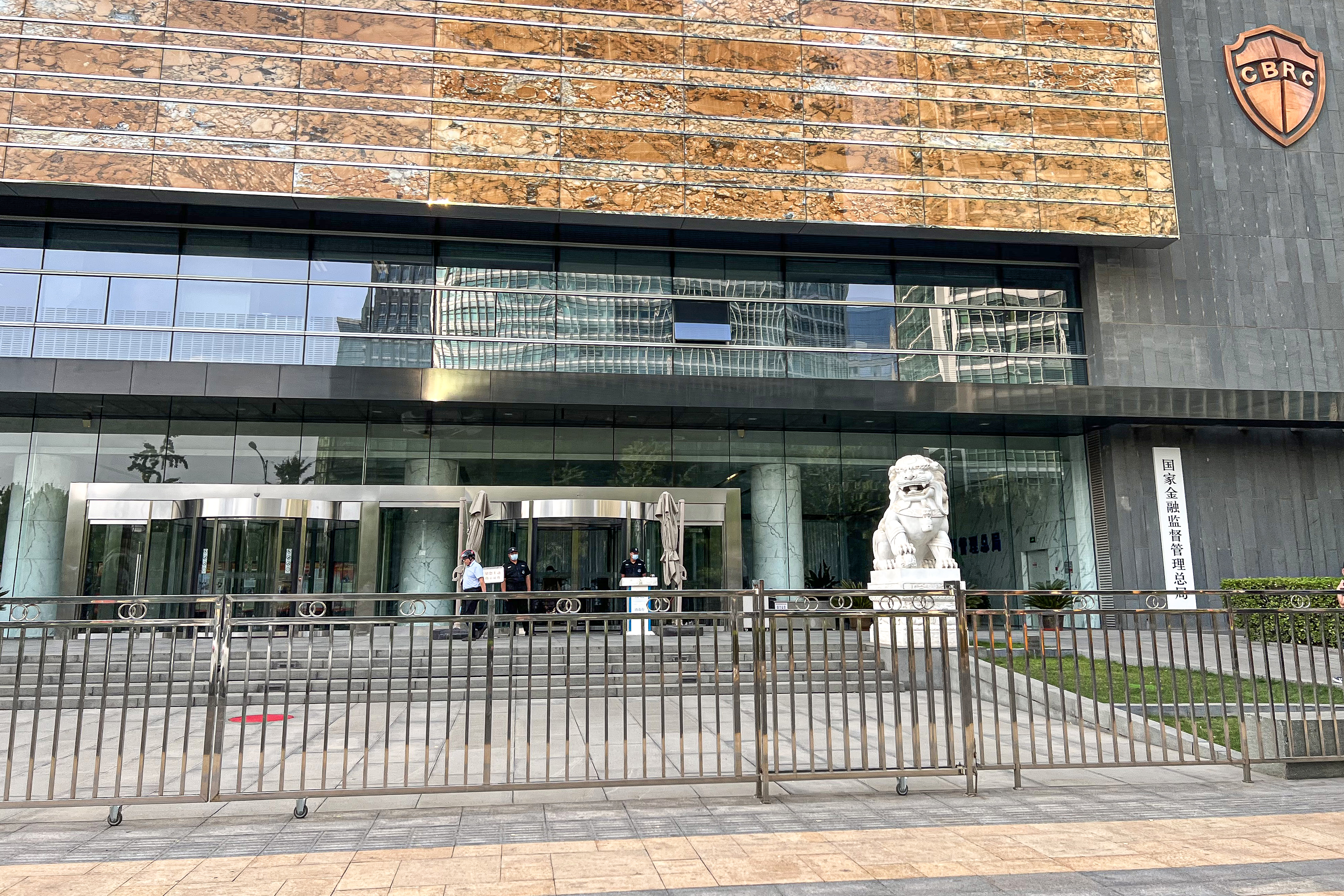
- Headquarters

Agency overview
- Formed: March 10, 2023
- Preceding agency: China Banking and Insurance Regulatory Commission
- Jurisdiction: China
- Headquarters: Beijing
- Agency executive: Ding Xiangqun, Director
- Parent agency: State Council
- Website: www.nfra.gov.cn

The National Financial Regulatory Administration (NFRA; Chinese: 国家金融监督管理总局) is a regulatory agency, under the State Council of the People's Republic of China. It is responsible for overseeing the financial sector (including banking and insurance) in China, except securities. It is also known as National Administration of Financial Regulation (NAFR).

== History ==
The NFRA was established on 10 March 2023 to replace the China Banking and Insurance Regulatory Commission (CBIRC) as part of the plan on reforming Party and state institutions, also taking over some roles from the People's Bank of China (PBC) and the China Securities Regulatory Commission (CSRC). On May 10, 2023, Li Yunze was appointed as the Chinese Communist Party committee secretary of the NFRA. On May 19, 2023, Li was appointed as the director of the NFRA.

== Responsibilities ==
The NFRA oversees regulatory supervision, including the enforcement of financial laws and regulations, of nearly all parts of the financial industry except securities, which are instead managed by the CSRC.

== Structure ==
The NFRA has 27 departments, one more than the former CBIRC. It is planned to absorb around 1,600 county-level branches of the People's Bank of China; the PBC had 1,761 such branches at the end of 2021. The NFRA has an International Advisory Council, which is made up of current and former leaders of foreign financial companies and institutions.

== Leadership ==
=== Directors ===
Name	Chinese name	Took office	Left office	Ref.
Li Yunze	李云泽	19 May 2023	29 April 2026	

== See also ==
- Central Financial Commission
- List of financial supervisory authorities by country
