= Liu Qiang (politician, born 1971) =

Chinese politician

- 刘强

Communist Party Secretary of Jinan
- Incumbent
- Assumed office March 2022
- Deputy: Yu Haitian (mayor)
- Preceded by: Sun Licheng

Personal details
- Born: March 1971 (age 55) Haiyuan County, Ningxia, China
- Party: Chinese Communist Party
- Education: University of the Chinese Academy of Sciences

Chinese name
- Simplified Chinese: 刘强
- Traditional Chinese: 劉強
Transcriptions
Standard Mandarin
- Hanyu Pinyin: Liú Qiáng

Liu Qiang (Chinese: 刘强; born March 1971) is a Chinese banker and politician, currently serving as party secretary of Jinan since March 2022.

He is a representative of the 20th National Congress of the Chinese Communist Party and a member of the 20th Central Committee of the Chinese Communist Party.

== Early life and education ==
Liu was born in Haiyuan County, Ningxia, in March 1971. He graduated from the University of the Chinese Academy of Sciences.

== Career ==
He entered the workforce in July 1993, and joined the Chinese Communist Party (CCP) in December 1996. He worked at the Agricultural Bank of China for a long time, where he eventually became its governor of the Shanghai Branch in July 2015. In July 2016, he was appointed vice governor of the Bank of China.

He got involved in politics in September 2018, when he was made vice governor of Shandong. He concurrently served as secretary-general and member of the CCP Shandong Provincial Committee since May 2020. In March 2022, he was chosen as party secretary of the capital city Jinan, succeeding Sun Licheng. On 29 October 2026, at the fifth plenary session of the 20th CCP Central Committee, he was elected as a member of the Central Committee.

Party political offices
Preceded by Sun Licheng	Secretary-General of the Shandong Provincial Committee of the Chinese Communist Party; 2020–2022	Succeeded by Zhang Haibo
Preceded by Sun Licheng	Communist Party Secretary of Jinan; 2022–present	Incumbent
