= Chinese Society of Astronautics =

Chinese professional association

- Abbreviation: CSA
- Founded: 23 October 1979
- Founder: Qian Xuesen; Ren Xinmin; Zhang Zhenhuan
- Type: Professional organization
- Purpose: Space
- Location: Haidian District, Beijing, China
- Region served: China
- Members: 30,000
- Key people: Lei Fanpei
- Parent organization: China Association for Science and Technology
- Website: www.csaspace.org.cn

The Chinese Society of Astronautics (simplified Chinese: 中国宇航学会; traditional Chinese: 中國宇航學會; pinyin: Zhōngguó Yǔháng Xuéhuì; abbreviated CSA) is a professional association of individuals with an interest in space. As of 2019, the society has 38 specialized committees and 179 working committees with more than 30,000 individual members.

== History ==
The initial concept of the Chinese Society of Astronautics was proposed in 1977 and accepted by the China Association for Science and Technology (CAST). The Chinese Society of Astronautics was founded by Qian Xuesen, Ren Xinmin and Zhang Zhenhuan on October 23, 1979. In September 1980 it became a member of the International Astronautical Federation (IAF).

== Scientific publishing ==
- Journal of Astronautics
- Advances in Aerospace Science and Technology
- Space Exploration

== List of presidents ==
No.	Name	Chinese name	Notes
1	Ren Xinmin	任新民	
2	Ren Xinmin	任新民	
3	Liu Jiyuan	刘纪原	
4	Liu Jiyuan	刘纪原	
5	Ma Xingrui	马兴瑞	
6	Lei Fanpei	雷凡培	
7	Lei Fanpei	雷凡培	
