= 21st National Congress of the Chinese Communist Party =

2027 Chinese Communist Party conference

- The flag of the Chinese Communist Party
- Begins: 2027
- Locations: Great Hall of the People, Beijing, China
- Previous event: 20th National Congress of the Chinese Communist Party (2022)
- Major events: Election of the 21st Central Committee and 21st Central Commission for Discipline Inspection
- Leader: Xi Jinping (General Secretary of the Chinese Communist Party)

21st National Congress of the Chinese Communist Party
- Simplified Chinese: 中国共产党第二十一次全国代表大会
- Traditional Chinese: 中國共產黨第二十一次全國代表大會
Transcriptions
Standard Mandarin
- Hanyu Pinyin: Zhōngguó Gòngchǎndǎng Dìèrshíyīcì Quánguó Dàibiǎo Dàhuì

Abbreviation
- Chinese: 二十一大
Transcriptions
Standard Mandarin
- Hanyu Pinyin: èrshíyī dà

The 21st National Congress of the Chinese Communist Party is scheduled to be held in the Great Hall of the People, Beijing in the second half of 2027. The National Congress is formally the supreme body of the Chinese Communist Party, and is stipulated to be held every five years.

== Background and preparation ==
On 29 October 2026, the fifth session of the 20th Central Committee of the Chinese Communist Party decided that the 21th CCP National Congress would be held in the second half of 2027. On 7 November 2026, the CCP Central Committee issued the "Notice on the Election of Delegates to the 21st CCP National Congress", making arrangements for the election of delegates to the 21st Party National Congress. The CCP Central Committee determined that there would be a total of 2,360 delegates to the 21st National Congress, who would be elected by 38 electoral units across the country. The election work began immediately and was scheduled to end before the end of June 2027.
