= Wang Xi =

Wang Xi may refer to:

- Wang Xi (Eastern Jin) (王熙), Eastern Jin Dynasty Consort Kin and General
- Wang Xi (emperor) (王延羲, later 王曦, ?-944), emperor of the Chinese Five Dynasties and Ten Kingdoms Period state Min
- Sukjong of Goryeo (王熙, later 王顒, 1054-1105), 15th king of the Goryeo dynasty
- Wang Xi (Yuan Dynasty) (王熙), painter during the reign of Toghon Temür
- Wang Xi (Ming Dynasty) (王熙), Fujian Shaowu painter during the Ming Dynasty
- Wang Xi (Qing Dynasty) (王熙, 1628-1703), high ranking official in the court of the Shunzhi Emperor
- Wang Xi (Shanxi vice governor) (王西, 1920-2005), former vice governor of Shanxi.
- Wang Xi (jurist) (王曦, 1952-), Chinese jurist and politician, standing committee member of the China National Democratic Construction Association
- Wang Xi (politician) (王曦, 1966-), Chinese materials scientist and politician, currently vice governor of Guangdong.
- Wong He (1967-), or Wang Xi (王喜), Hong Kong actor, singer, and presenter
- Wang Xi (economist) (王曦, 1971-), Chinese economist and politician, currently CCP Municipal Committee Secretary of Qinhuangdao
- Wang Xi (Go player) (王檄, 1984-), Chinese Go player
- Elvis Wang (1985-), or Wang Xi (王晰), Chinese pop bass singer
