= Resolution on Further Deepening Reform Comprehensively to Advance Chinese Modernization =

2024 Chinese Communist Party document

The Resolution of the Central Committee of the Communist Party of China on Further Deepening Reform Comprehensively to Advance Chinese Modernization is a document adopted by the 20th Central Committee of the Chinese Communist Party (CCP) on its third plenary session held between 15 and 18 July 2024. It outlines China's economic reform goals from 2024 to 2029.

== Drafting ==
In November 2023, the Politburo of the Chinese Communist Party decided to establish a draft group for the documents of the third plenary session of the 20th Central Committee, with Xi Jinping as the group leader and Wang Huning, Cai Qi, and Ding Xuexiang as deputy group leaders. The group held its first meeting on 8 December 2023. During the drafting process, the Politburo Standing Committee held three meetings while the Politburo held two meetings.

== Content ==
Regarding economics, the resolution said they must "better leverage the role of the market" and "make resource allocation as efficient and productive as possible", calling on to "lift restrictions on the market" while ensuring effective regulation" and "strive to better maintain order in the market and remedy market failures". The resolution also highlighted efforts in "building a unified national market". The resolution also focused heavily on "deepening the reform of the fiscal system, deepening financial system reform, and improving the mechanism for implementing the regional coordinated development strategy," referring to the financial and fiscal sectors as "key areas."

The document calls for strengthening the system of people's congress, including refining the Law on Oversight by the Standing Committees of People's Congresses. It also mentions the socialist legal system with Chinese characteristics, and calls for "establishing a system for reporting on constitutional enforcement". The communique of the plenum stated all the reform tasks laid out in the resolution would be completed by the 80th anniversary of the People's Republic of China in 2029.
