= Central Committee of the Chinese Communist Party =

Political body comprising top CCP leaders

Central Committee of the Chinese Communist Party 中国共产党中央委员会
- 20th Central Committee of the Chinese Communist Party

Overview
- Type: Political-executive organ
- Elected by: National Congress
- Length of term: Five years
- Term limits: None

History
- Established: by 2nd National Congress on 23 July 1922; 104 years ago
- First convocation: 23 July 1922

Leadership
- General Secretary: Xi Jinping, General Secretary of the Party Central Committee
- Executive organ: Politburo
- Military organ: Central Military Commission

Members
- Total: 191

Alternates
- Total: 132

Elections
- Last election: 20th National Congress (2022)

Meeting place
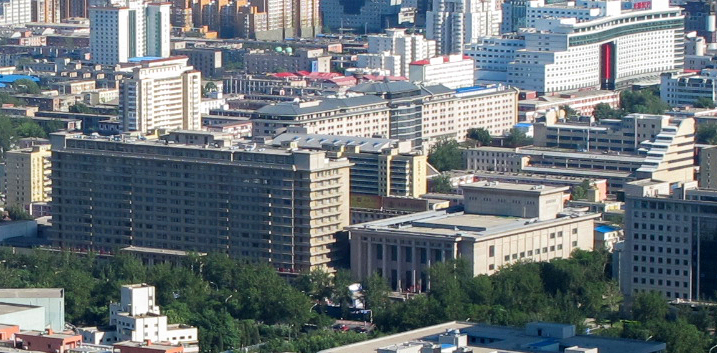
- Jingxi Hotel, Beijing (Working sessions); Great Hall of the People, Beijing

Constitution
- Constitution of the Chinese Communist Party

Regulation
- Regulations on Work of the Central Committee of the Chinese Communist Party

Central Committee of the Chinese Communist Party
- Simplified Chinese: 中国共产党中央委员会
- Traditional Chinese: 中國共產黨中央委員會
Transcriptions
Standard Mandarin
- Hanyu Pinyin: Zhōngguó Gòngchǎndǎng Zhōngyāng Wěiyuánhuì

Abbreviation
- Chinese: 中共中央
- Literal meaning: Chinese Communist Central
Transcriptions
Standard Mandarin
- Hanyu Pinyin: Zhōnggòng Zhōngyāng

Alternative abbreviation
- Simplified Chinese: 党中央
- Traditional Chinese: 黨中央
- Literal meaning: Party Central
Transcriptions
Standard Mandarin
- Hanyu Pinyin: Dǎng Zhōngyāng

Shortest abbreviation
- Simplified Chinese: 中央
- Traditional Chinese: 中央
- Literal meaning: Central
Transcriptions
Standard Mandarin
- Hanyu Pinyin: Zhōngyāng

The Central Committee of the Chinese Communist Party, officially the Central Committee of the Communist Party of China, is the highest organ when the national party congress is not in session and is tasked with carrying out congress resolutions, directing all party work, and representing the Chinese Communist Party (CCP) externally. The current electoral term (20th) is composed of 205 members and 150 alternates. The composition is elected once every five years by the National Congress of the Chinese Communist Party. In practice, the selection process is done privately, usually through consultation of the CCP's Politburo and its corresponding Standing Committee.

The Central Committee is, formally, the "party's highest organ of authority" when the National Congress is not in a plenary session. According to the CCP's constitution, the Central Committee is vested with the power to elect the General Secretary and the members of the Politburo and its Standing Committee, as well as the Central Military Commission. It endorses the composition of the Secretariat and the Central Commission for Discipline Inspection. It also oversees the work of various executive national organs of the CCP. The administrative activities of the Central Committee are carried out by the Central Committee's General Office. The General Office forms the support staff of the central organs that work on the Central Committee's behalf in between plenary sessions (plenums).

The Committee usually convenes at least once a year at a plenum, and functions as a top forum for discussion about relevant policy issues. The committee operates, however, on the principle of democratic centralism; i.e., once a decision is made, the entire body speaks with one voice. The role of the Central Committee has varied throughout history. While it generally exercises power through formal procedures defined in the party constitution, the ability for it to affect outcomes of national-level personnel decisions is limited, as that function has generally been, in practice, carried out by the Politburo and retired party elders who retain influence. Nonetheless, Central Committee plenums function as venues whereby policy is discussed, fine-tuned, and publicly released in the form of "resolutions" or "decisions".

== History ==
=== Early history ===
The Central Committee's role has varied throughout history. It was founded in 1927 as a successor organization to the "Central Executive Committee" (中央执行委员会), a group of party leaders charged with executing party work during the pre-revolutionary days of the CCP. Over the next several decades it served to confirm the party leadership lineup and legitimize military, strategic, and foreign relations decisions of the party. In practice, power was concentrated in a small group of military and political leaders (the Secretariat or the Politburo), and, beginning at the Zunyi Conference in 1935, Mao held great power personally. Moreover, during the Second Sino-Japanese War and the Chinese Civil War between 1937 and 1949, the Central Committee rarely convened, partly because of the logistical difficulties of bringing together leading cadres involved in different theatres of war and agitation.

Beginning in 1949 at the founding of the People's Republic of China, the Central Committee gradually transformed from a revolutionary organ to a governing one, though again the day-to-day work and most political power resided with a few leaders, most notably the Politburo, then de facto chaired by Liu Shaoqi, and the Secretariat, then under Deng Xiaoping. Although the Central Committee was required to convene at least once a year, it did not convene at all in 1951–1953, 1960, 1963–1965, and 1967. Informal and 'extraordinary' mechanisms were sometimes used for the purposes of discussing party policy, for example, the Seven Thousand Cadres Conference in 1962, meant to be a summation of the lessons of the Great Leap Forward. Mao did not hold absolute power over the Central Committee, as evidenced by the debates surrounding the policies of the Great Leap Forward, as well as the economic policies of the early 1960s. However, Mao used Central Committee meetings as a platform to project authority or legitimize decisions which have been made in advance, such as at the Lushan Conference of 1959, when the Central Committee ratified the decision to denounce Peng Dehuai, who had spoken out in opposition of the Great Leap Forward.

During the early stages of the Cultural Revolution, the Central Committee essentially ceased to function; it was convened in August 1966 (11th Plenum of the 8th CC) to cement decisions already made by Mao on launching the Cultural Revolution. Mao faced some opposition at the 11th Plenum but ultimately most delegates were goaded into ratifying Mao's decisions. Many members were politically disgraced or purged thereafter. The committee was then convened again in October 1968 (12th Plenum) to ratify the decision to expel then head of state Liu Shaoqi from the Party. At the 12th plenum, less than half the members actually attended, as many had fallen victim to the Cultural Revolution. In a letter to Mao "evaluating" the members of the Central Committee at the time, Kang Sheng wrote that some 70% of CC members were considered "traitors, spies, or otherwise politically unreliable". The Central Committee membership at the 9th National Congress in April 1969 was largely handpicked by Mao and a small group of radical allies. The decisions at the Congress were later deemed to be "wholly and absolutely wrong" by official party historians.

=== Since the reform and opening up ===
Since economic reforms began in 1978, the Central Committee has usually been composed of the leading figures of the party, government, the provinces, and the military. In contrast to National Congresses of the CCP, which have always been essentially ceremonial exercises, full meetings of the Central Committee have occasionally emerged as arenas in which there were substantive debates and decisions on party policy. An example of this was the Third Plenary Session of the 11th CCP Central Committee in 1978, at which China formally embarked on the reform and opening up. Deng Xiaoping also attempted to increase the level of "intra party democracy" in the 1980s by introducing so-called "more candidates than seats" election method (差额选举), which meant that not everyone who was nominated would be elected to the Central Committee.

Despite experimenting with power separation on a broad scale in the 1980s, including the separation of party and state leadership positions, real decision-making power continued to reside in the hands of a dozen or so party elites, including party elders that formed the Central Advisory Commission (later abolished). For instance, the decision to crack down on the 1989 Tiananmen Square protests, and on top leadership changes in its aftermath, such as the purge of then General Secretary Zhao Ziyang, were made by "party elders" and a small group of top leaders, without first convening the Central Committee. Zhao questioned the legality of his removal in his memoirs released in 2006.

While Central Committee meetings do not usually serve as forums for substantive debate, they have sometimes 'fine-tuned' the policies agreed upon at the Politburo level. But the Central Committee does not, by convention, overturn policies decided at higher levels. The Central Committee is larger and has a somewhat more diverse ideological spectrum than the Politburo. Since its plenary sessions is a rare event that concentrates almost all of China's top leaders in one location, it could also be seen as a convenient venue for informal deal-making.

=== 21st century ===
Hu Jintao's administration (2002–2012) attempted to embrace collective leadership, as well as more "intra-party democracy"; Hu was not a strong "core" figure in the same sense as Mao or Deng Xiaoping. The Central Committee thus gained more prominence as a bona fide consultation body. In 2003, Hu also cancelled the traditional August leadership retreat at the coastal town of Beidaihe, while giving more media coverage to the Central Committee plenums held in the fall. This was seen as an indication that Hu wanted to eschew informal decision-making by the handful of elites in favour of "inner-party democracy" involving bodies such as the Central Committee. However, the Beidaihe meetings resumed in July 2007, when political deliberation took place in anticipation of the 17th National Congress; the same Bedaihe retreat also took place in 2011 in anticipation of the 18th National Congress. This indicated that important personnel and policy decisions continued to be the domain of a small group of elites at the very top of the party hierarchy.

Since the 17th National Congress, the Central Committee has seen an increase in the number of regional leadership figures. The 17th Central Committee formed with every province-level Party Secretary and Governor gaining a full seat on the Central Committee. The rise of regional party representation came at the expense of that of government ministries. Since Xi Jinping's rise to power at the 18th National Congress, the Central Committee plenums in 2013 and 2014 were given significant media coverage, as they marked the beginning of another round of comprehensive economic and social reforms (2013) and legal reforms (2014), respectively.

== Function ==
According to the party constitution, the Central Committee is tasked with "carrying out the decisions of the National Congress, leading the work of the party, and representing the party internationally." The Central Committee is therefore technically the "party's highest organ of authority" when the National Congress is not in session. The National Congress is convened only once every five years, so the Central Committee can be called upon in the interim to make extremely far-reaching decisions, or at least legitimize a change in direction mandated by the Politburo or other party leaders. The Central Committee must also be theoretically convened to prepare for a National Congress; for example, to determine its dates, delegate selection, agenda, and so on.

The Central Committee has the power to elect the General Secretary and the members of the Politburo, its Standing Committee, and the Central Military Commission. These elections take place in the form of confirmation votes; i.e., there is only one candidate, a delegate can choose to vote for or against or abstain for that candidate. In some instances write-in candidates may also be allowed. In practice, for important posts such as the General Secretary or the Politburo Standing Committee, there is no known occasion since 1949 where the Central Committee voted against a candidate already vetted by the top party leadership in advance.

The Central Committee also confirms membership of the Secretariat, the organ in charge of executing party policy, whose membership is determined through nomination by the Politburo Standing Committee. The directors of China's 50 largest state-owned enterprises are appointed directly by the Central Committee and are equivalent in rank to ministers or vice ministers.

=== Plenary sessions ===
The Committee usually convenes at least once a year at a plenary session. The plenums typically open and close in the state banquet hall of the Great Hall of the People, with the working meetings of the plenum being held at the military run Jingxi Hotel in Beijing. The plenums of the Central Committee are the most important annually occurring event in Chinese politics. Normally, seven plenums are held over a five-year term of the Central Committee; two plenums are held at the year of the Party National Congress, another two held in the following year, and one held in each of the other three years. The first, second and seventh plenums generally deal with procedures around the five-yearly power transition process, containing no major policy announcements.

The first plenum, held a day after the conclusion of a Party National Congress, elects the top leadership, including the Politburo, the Politburo Standing Committee, and the General Secretary. The second plenum, held in February or March of the following year, typically approves a list of candidates for state positions, as well as a plan to overhaul Party and State organizations, which are then approved during a National People's Congress (NPC) session held immediately afterwards. The third plenum, generally held in the autumn of the year after the CCP National Congress, focuses on economic issues, and is generally the session when major economic and reform decisions are made and announced. The fifth plenum focuses on finalizing the upcoming five-year plan, which is then approved by the NPC in the following spring. The fourth and sixth plenums do not have a fixed theme, and usually focus on CCP ideology or Party building. The seventh plenum, the last held before the end of a Central Committee's term, focuses on preparations for the upcoming National Congress.

== Structure and membership selection ==
The Central Committee houses three important party departments: (1) the Organization Department, (2) the Publicity Department, and (3) the United Front Work Department. It has a secretariat which performs routine tasks including arranging leadership's schedules and document flows.

Central Committee members are elected every five years during the National Congress, and they in turn vote for the new Politburo, standing committee, and general secretary. The Central Committee has full members (weiyuan) and alternate or candidate members (houbuweiyuan). The practice of having "full" and "alternate" members is consistent with other Leninist parties in history, such as the Communist Party of the Soviet Union or the Communist Party of Vietnam. Members are elected by National Congresses through a confirmation vote (i.e., vote "yes", "no", or abstain) on a candidate list, where the number of candidates exceed the number of available seats. Unlike the Politburo, whose membership has historically been determined by informal deliberations that include incumbent Politburo members and retired Politburo Standing Committee members, the method of candidate selection for the Central Committee membership receives less coverage, though it appears to be managed by the incumbent Politburo and its Standing Committee. Since the 1980s membership patterns in the Central Committee have gradually stabilized. For example, provincial governors and party secretaries are almost guaranteed a seat on the Central Committee.

The primary difference between full members and alternate members is that full members have voting rights. Alternate members attend Central Committee plenary sessions, and can presumably voice their views on issues, but do not have the right to vote. At party plenary sessions, members of the Politburo seats at the front of the auditorium or meeting hall, facing the rest of the Central Committee. Full members are ordered by protocol, and seated, according to "surname stroke order" (xingshi bihua paiming), an impartial ordering system that is roughly equivalent of alphabetizing the names. Alternate members follow a different protocol sequence: they are arranged by the number of votes received when they were elected at the previous National Congress.

Alternate members may be elevated to full members if a full member dies in office, resigns, or is removed from the body. Priority of ascension to full member status is given to the alternate member who received the highest number of votes in favor at the previous National Congress.

Membership changes, such as the expulsion of a full member or an elevation of an alternate member, are confirmed through passing a formally adopted resolution at Central Committee plenary sessions.

=== Contemporary composition ===
==== Full members ====
Most members of the Central Committee are provincial governors or government ministers. For example, officials holding, or expected to hold the following positions at the time of a new national party congress can be generally expected to hold a seat on the Central Committee:

- The party chiefs and governors of provinces (mayors of direct-controlled municipalities and chairpersons of autonomous regions)
- The ministers and minister-level commissioners of the State Council of the People's Republic of China
- The heads of the military-region level organizations of the People's Liberation Army, including the heads of the PLA departments under the Central Military Commission
- Ministerial-level heads of the party organizations which report directly to the Central Committee, including the chiefs of the General Offices serving major party leading groups
- The national-level heads of state-sponsored civic institutions

Occasionally officials of vice-ministerial rank could also hold membership on the Central Committee, though only in rare and exceptional circumstances. For example, Ma Xingrui, the party chief of Shenzhen (as of 2015), was a member of the 18th Central Committee.

While institutional rules has, since the 1980s, played a major role in the selection of Central Committee members, it does not guarantee that holders of a specific office will gain a seat on the CC. If a CC member is transferred to a different post, they maintain their CC membership. For example, a Governor of Shandong who is transferred to a position of less significance does not lose his seat on the CC, neither will his successor gain a seat on the CC. This has created situations in which individuals who do not sit on the Central Committee assume provincial leadership positions. An individual already provisionally named to a provincial leadership post may also be rejected by the "more candidates than seats" voting method – as appeared to be the case with Li Yuanchao (then Jiangsu party chief) in 2002, and Yang Xiong (mayor of Shanghai) in 2012.

==== Alternate members ====
In contrast to full membership, alternate membership of the Central Committee is more varied in its composition, and there are fewer institutional rules governing its membership list. Generally speaking, since the 1980s, alternate membership in the Central Committee is composed of officials of provincial-ministerial rank or sub-provincial (vice-minister) rank. They are selected based on a combination of experience and the institutions that they represent. Many are heads of provincial party departments or party chiefs of big cities. Prominent academics with no political experience and state-owned enterprise chief executives often hold alternate seats on the Central Committee. Some alternate members therefore hold no other political positions. Younger alternate members are also generally seen to be "up-and-coming" national leaders.

=== Election of members ===
Though all nominations for the Central Committee are decided beforehand, since the 13th National Congress in 1987, in the spirit of promoting "inner-party democracy", the number of candidates up for election for both full members and alternate members have been greater than the number of available seats. Nominees for the Central Committee who receive the lowest number of votes from National Congress delegates are thus unable to enter the Central Committee. Usually, around 8% to 12% of candidates are not elected to the Central Committee. At the 18th National Congress, a total of 224 candidates stood for election for full membership for a total of 205 seats. A total of 190 candidates stood for election for a total of 171 alternate seats. This meant that 9.3% of full member candidates and 11.1% alternate member candidates were not elected. In the 19th and 20th National Congresses, elections for the Central Committee with "more candidates than available seats" were done during separate delegation meetings in a preliminary manner instead of the previous method of the elections being held by all delegates in their entirety at the same time, meaning that these elections were held under the "guidance" of higher party authorities.

Candidates to the Central Committee go through strict vetting. 19 months before the National Congress, a Leading Group for Cadre Selection is formed, led by the CCP general secretary. Afterwards, the Politburo approves guiding principles related to official selection work, specifying requirements, candidate qualifications and composition. Subsequently, the Leading Group approves the plan, including allocation of nominee quotas and selection methods. Then, a 14-month long vetting process starts. Around 50 inspection teams are sent to all regions, ministries and the military to conduct in-depth investigations and interviews. The Leading Group holds multiple meetings with the inspection groups to hear their reports. The Politburo Standing Committee also conducts six meetings to hear the reports. Additionally, the Central Commission for Discipline Inspection conducts its own separate interview of candidates. Two months before the National Congress, the Politburo Standing Committee proposes a preliminary list of nomination of candidates to the Central Committee. A month later, the list is approved by the Politburo and submitted to the National Congress. During the National Congress, the Director of the Organization Department explains the proposed list to the Congress Presidium, and preliminary elections are held for the final list of candidates, leading the Presidium to approve the list for a final vote. At the closing day of the National Congress, the delegates then elect the new Central Committee.

=== Turnover, age, and gender of membership ===
Since the 1980s, the membership of the Central Committee has experienced rapid turnover, mostly due to the institutionalization of the system of promotions for party officials as well as an informally mandated retirement age, currently set at 65 for minister-level officials (which comprise the majority of the members of the Central Committee). The minimum age of members has steadily increased, with the youngest about 56 in 2026. The median age has stayed constant in the high 50s since the 13th National Congress in 1987. From the 1980s onwards, an average of 62% of the membership of the outgoing Central Committee has been replaced at each national congress. Since most members are at least 50 years old when they enter the body, the mandatory retirement age essentially serves as a 'term limit' on the entire membership of the Central Committee, whereby no member or group of members could conceivably serve longer than three terms on the Central Committee. It also makes forming enduring political factions difficult. Chinese politics analyst Cheng Li noted that this makes the body much more fluid than most national legislatures, for which term limits do not generally apply. Women have consistently remained under 10 percent of the Central Committee's members.

== See also ==
- Chinese Communist Party Provincial Standing Committee
