= Zhao Shi (politician) =

Chinese politician

- 赵实

Party Branch Secretary of the China Federation of Literary and Art Circles
- In office February 2011 – April 2017
- Preceded by: Hu Zhenmin
- Succeeded by: Li Yi

Personal details
- Born: August 1953 (age 73) Changchun, Jilin, China
- Party: Chinese Communist Party
- Education: Jilin Education College; Jilin University

Chinese name
- Simplified Chinese: 赵实
- Traditional Chinese: 趙實
Transcriptions
Standard Mandarin
- Hanyu Pinyin: Zhào Shí

Zhao Shi (Chinese: 赵实; born August 1953) is a Chinese politician. She was a member of the 18th Central Committee of the Chinese Communist Party. She was a representative of the 13th, 14th, 16th and 17th National Congress of the Chinese Communist Party.

== Biography ==
Zhao was born in Changchun, Jilin, in August 1953, while her ancestral home in Beijing. During the Cultural Revolution, she was a sent-down youth in Qianguo County, Liuhe County, and Dehui County between November 1968 and September 1975. She joined the Chinese Communist Party (CCP) in May 1979. Beginning in September 1975, she served in several posts in Changchun Film Studio, including deputy director, director, deputy manager, deputy party secretary, and party secretary. In September 1992, she was appointed deputy party secretary of Changchun, capital of Jilin province.

Zhao was transferred to Beijing in May 1993, where she was appointed secretary of the Secretariat of the Central Committee of the Communist Youth League of China and vice chairwoman of the All China Youth Federation. In January 1996, she was made deputy director of the State Administration of Radio, Film and Television, concurrently holding the deputy party branch secretary position since February 2003. In February 2011, she took office as party branch secretary of the China Federation of Literary and Art Circles. She also served as vice chairwoman and secretary of the Secretariat from June 2011 to September 2018.

Party political offices
Preceded by Hu Zhenmin	Party Branch Secretary of the China Federation of Literary and Art Circles; 2011–2017	Succeeded by Li Yi
