= Fu Hua =

Chinese politician

- 傅华

President and Party Secretary of Xinhua News Agency
- Incumbent
- Assumed office June 2022
- Preceded by: He Ping

Personal details
- Born: August 1964 (age 62) Rudong County, Jiangsu, China
- Party: Chinese Communist Party
- Education: Yangzhou Teachers College (BA); Renmin University (LLD)

Chinese name
- Simplified Chinese: 傅华
- Traditional Chinese: 傅華
Transcriptions
Standard Mandarin
- Hanyu Pinyin: Fù Huá

Fu Hua (Chinese: 傅华; born August 1964) is a Chinese politician who is the current president and Chinese Communist Party Committee Secretary of Xinhua News Agency, in office since June 2022.

He is a representative of the 20th National Congress of the Chinese Communist Party and a member of the 20th Central Committee of the Chinese Communist Party.

== Early life and education ==
Fu was born in Rudong, Jiangsu, in August 1964. Fu received a Bachelor of Arts with a major in Chinese language and literature from Yangzhou Teachers College in 1985.

== Political career ==
Fu entered the workforce in July 1985, and joined the Chinese Communist Party (CCP) in December 1993.

Fu worked in China Business Daily before being assigned to the State Council. He then successively served as assistant governor and deputy governor of Fangshan District and head of the Publicity Department of the CCP Xicheng District Committee in Beijing. He was deputy head of the Publicity Department of the Beijing Municipal Committee of the CCP in February 2010 and subsequently deputy secretary-general of the same committee in July 2011.

Fu became president and party branch secretary of Beijing Daily in April 2014, and served until November 2016, when he was appointed vice president of the All-China Journalists Association. He had also briefly served as executive deputy head of the Publicity Department of the CCP Beijing Municipal Committee. In April 2017, he was chosen as editor-in-chief of Economic Daily, a state-owned newspaper focusing on economic reports. Fu was appointed head of the Publicity Department of the Guangdong Provincial Committee of the CCP in March 2018 and was admitted to member of its Standing Committee, the province's top authority.

In February 2020, Fu was recalled to the central government and appointed deputy head of the Publicity Department of the Chinese Communist Party. Fu was appointed editor-in-chief of Xinhua News Agency in June 2021, and was promoted to its president and CCP Committee Secretary in June 2022. In September 2022, Fu stated, "Xinhua will never depart from the party line, not even for a minute, nor stray from the path laid down by General Secretary Xi Jinping".

Party political offices
Preceded by Mei Ninghua	President of Beijing Daily; 2014–2017	Succeeded by Zhao Jingyun (赵靖云)
Preceded by Shen Haixiong	Head of the Publicity Department of Guangdong Provincial Committee of the Chinese Communist Party; 2018–2020	Succeeded by Zhang Fuhai
Government offices
Preceded by Zhang Xiaoying (张小影)	Editor-in-Chief of Economic Daily; 2017–2018	Succeeded by Zhang Xiaoying (张小影)
Preceded by He Ping	Editor-in-Chief of Xinhua News Agency; 2021–2022	Succeeded by Lǖ Yansong
Preceded by He Ping	President of Xinhua News Agency; 2022–	Incumbent
