= Xiao Pei =

Chinese politician

- 肖培
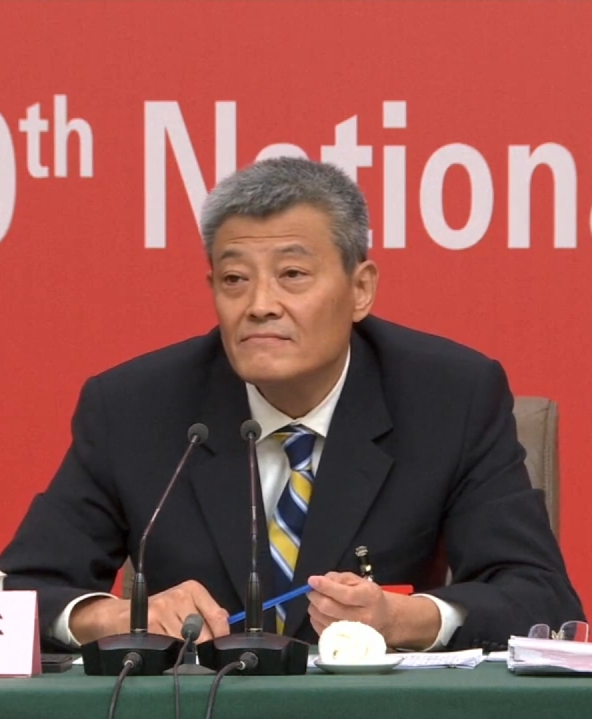
- Xiao in 2022

Deputy Secretary of the Central Commission for Discipline Inspection
- Incumbent
- Assumed office October 2017
- Secretary: Zhao Leji; Li Xi

Deputy director, National Supervisory Commission
- In office March 2018 – August 2026
- Director: Yang Xiaodu; Liu Jinguo

Personal details
- Born: January 1961 (age 65) Zhenjiang, Jiangsu, China
- Party: Chinese Communist Party
- Education: Beijing Normal University; University of Science and Technology of China

Xiao Pei (Chinese: 肖培; pinyin: Xiāo Péi; born January 1961) is a Chinese editor and politician who is the current deputy director of the National Supervisory Commission and deputy secretary of the Central Commission for Discipline Inspection. He is a representative of the 20th National Congress of the Chinese Communist Party.

== Early life and education ==
Xiao was born in Zhenjiang, Jiangsu, in January 1961. After resuming the college entrance examination, in 1980, he was accepted to Beijing Normal University, majoring in political education. After University in 1984, he worked at the university. He received his Master in Management degree from the University of Science and Technology of China in June 1999.

== Beijing municipal government ==
Xiao joined the Chinese Communist Party (CCP) in February 1985. In May 1989, he became deputy head of Publicity Department of Beijing Municipal Committee of the Communist Youth League of China, rising to head two months later. In June 1998, he was appointed executive deputy editor-in-chief of Beijing Evening News, and was promoted to the editor-in-chief position in April 1999. He also served as deputy editor-in-chief of Beijing Daily from April 1999 from March 2002. He was deputy head of Publicity Department of the CCP Beijing Municipal Committee in March 2002, in addition to serving as head of Press and Publicity Department of the Beijing Organizing Committee for the Olympic Games and director of Beijing Network Management Office. He was deputy secretary-general of the CCP Beijing Municipal Committee in February 2009 and subsequently director of Beijing Municipal Cultural Bureau in July 2011.

== CCP Central Committee ==
In January 2003, Xiao was assigned to the General Office of the CCP Central Committee, and eventually becoming leader of the 5th Group of the Investigate and Survey Office in July 2013. He concurrently served as head of Publicity Department of the CCP Central Commission for Discipline Inspection from March 2014 to July 2015 and vice minister of supervision from June 2015 to September 2017. After a short term as an inspector of the Anti-Graft Inspection Team, he was chosen as deputy secretary of the Central Commission for Discipline Inspection in October 2017, concurrently serving as deputy director of the National Supervisory Commission since March 2018.

Xiao stated that the CCP General Secretary Xi Jinping's crackdown on graft and corruption has been successful. In 2022, he stated that 207,000 CCP officials had been punished under Xi's tenure as party leader in the past 10 years. He further added that the "spread of graft has been resolutely contained."

In August 2026, he ceased to serve as Deputy Director of the National Commission of Supervision.

Government offices
Preceded by Jiang Gongmin (降巩民)	Director of Beijing Municipal Cultural Bureau; 2011–2013	Succeeded by Chen Dong (陈冬)
Party political offices
New title	Head of the Publicity Department of the Central Commission for Discipline Inspection; 2014–2015	Succeeded by Chen Xiaojiang
