= Li Yi (politician) =

Chinese politician (born 1960)

- 李屹

Party Branch Secretary of China Federation of Literary and Art Circles
- Incumbent
- Assumed office March 2017
- Chairman: Tie Ning
- Preceded by: Zhao Shi

Personal details
- Born: February 1960 (age 66) Qu County, Sichuan, China
- Party: Chinese Communist Party
- Education: Xinjiang University; Central Party School of the Chinese Communist Party

Li Yi (Chinese: 李屹; pinyin: Lǐ Yì; born February 1960) is a Chinese politician who is the current party branch secretary and vice president of China Federation of Literary and Art Circles, in office since March 2017.

He is a representative of the 19th National Congress of the Chinese Communist Party and a member of the 19th Central Committee of the Chinese Communist Party. He was a delegate to the 12th National People's Congress.

== Biography ==
Li was born in Qu County, Sichuan, in February 1960. He was a sent-down youth at the Xinjiang Production and Construction Corps in September 1977 and an electrician of Shengli II Hydropower Station in Aksu Area in April 1978. After resuming the college entrance examination, in September 1979, he was accepted to Xinjiang University, majoring in history. After graduating in 1983, he worked at the university for a year.

He joined the Chinese Communist Party in May 1983. In June 1984, he was assigned to the General Office of the CCP Xinjiang Uygur Autonomous Regional Committee, where he was promoted to deputy director in September 1995 and to director in January 2000. He also served as deputy secretary-general of the CCP Xinjiang Uygur Autonomous Regional Committee from February 1999 to December 2004. He was appointed head of the Propaganda Department of the CCP Xinjiang Uygur Autonomous Regional Committee in December 2004 and was admitted to member of the Standing Committee of the CCP Xinjiang Uygur Autonomous Regional Committee, the region's top authority.

In December 2010, he was made party branch secretary and vice president of China Federation of Literary and Art Circles, concurrently serving as secretary of its Secretariat.

Party political offices
Preceded by Fu Qiang	Director of the General Office of the CCP Xinjiang Uygur Autonomous Regional Committee; 2000–2004	Succeeded by Bai Zhijie
Preceded by Qian Zhi	Head of the Propaganda Department of the CCP Xinjiang Uygur Autonomous Regional Committee; 2004–2010	Succeeded by Hu Wei
Preceded by Zhao Shi	Party Branch Secretary of China Federation of Literary and Art Circles; 2017–present	Incumbent
