= Wen Gang =

Chinese executive and politician

- 温刚
- Born: August 1966 (age 60); Taiyuan, Shanxi, China
- Education: Beijing University of Technology
- Occupations: Executive, politician
- Years active: 2003–2026
- Agent: China Rongtong Asset Management Group Corporation Limited
- Political party: Chinese Communist Party (expelled in 2026)

Chinese name
- Simplified Chinese: 温刚
- Traditional Chinese: 溫剛
Transcriptions
Standard Mandarin
- Hanyu Pinyin: Wēn Gāng

Wen Gang (Chinese: 温刚; born August 1966) is a Chinese executive and politician, who served as the chairman of China Rongtong Asset Management Group Corporation Limited.

He was a representative of the 19th National Congress of the Chinese Communist Party and a representative of the 20th National Congress of the Chinese Communist Party and an alternate of the 20th Central Committee of the Chinese Communist Party. In October 2026, Wen was expelled from the Chinese Communist Party.

== Biography ==
Wen was born in Taiyuan, Shanxi, in August 1966, and graduated from Beijing University of Technology.

He worked in China Northern Chemical Industry Corporation before being assigned to the China North Industries Corporation. In 2003, he became deputy general manager, rising to general manager in 2013. In August 2018, he was promoted again to become chairman, but having held the position for only five months.

In 2020, he was appointed chairman of the newly founded China Rongtong Asset Management Group Corporation Limited.

On 29 October 2026, the fifth plenary session of the 20th CCP Central Committee reviewed and approved the report of the Central Commission for Discipline Inspection on the "serious violations of discipline and law" by Wen and confirmed the Politburo decision to expel him from the CCP.

Business positions
Preceded by Yin Jiaxu	Chairman of China North Industries Corporation; 2018–2019	Succeeded by Jiao Kaihe
New title	Chairman of China Rongtong Asset Management Group Corporation Limited; 2019–	Incumbent
