= Lei Fanpei =

Chinese politician

- 雷凡培
- Born: May 1963 (age 63); Heyang County, Shaanxi, China
- Education: Northwestern Polytechnical University
- Occupations: Executive, politician
- Years active: 1987–2026
- Agents: China Aerospace Science and Technology Corporation; China State Shipbuilding Corporation
- Political party: Chinese Communist Party (1985-2026, expelled)

Lei Fanpei (Chinese: 雷凡培; pinyin: Léi Fánpéi; born May 1963) is a Chinese executive and politician who served as chairman of the board of China State Shipbuilding Corporation from 2018 to 2022. Previously he served as chairman of the board of China Aerospace Science and Technology Corporation.

He was a representative of the 19th National Congress of the Chinese Communist Party. He was also a representative of the 20th National Congress of the Chinese Communist Party and a member of the 20th Central Committee of the Chinese Communist Party. In 2026, Lei was expelled from the Chinese Communist Party.

== Biography ==
Lei was born in Heyang County, Shaanxi, in May 1963. In 1980, he enrolled at Northwestern Polytechnical University where he received his bachelor's degree in 1984 and his master's degree in 1987 both in rocket engine. He joined the Chinese Communist Party (CCP) in January 1985.

After University in April 1987, he was assigned to the 067 Base of Ministry of Aerospace Industry (now China Academy of Aerospace Propulsion Technology, also known as the 6th Research Institute of China Aerospace Science and Technology Corporation), where he eventually becoming deputy director and then director in 1997. In February 2005, he became deputy general manager of the China Aerospace Science and Technology Corporation, rising to general manager in April 2013. He rose to become chairman of the board in May 2014.

He was appointed chairman of the board of China State Shipbuilding Corporation in March 2018, concurrently serving as party branch secretary.

On 29 October 2026, the fifth plenary session of the 20th CCP Central Committee reviewed and approved the report of the Central Commission for Discipline Inspection on the "serious violations of discipline and law" by Lei and confirmed the Politburo decision to expel him from the CCP.

Business positions
| Preceded by Ma Xingrui | General Manager of the China Aerospace Science and Technology Corporation; 2013–2014 | Succeeded by Wu Yansheng |
| Preceded by Xu Dazhe | Chairman of the Board of China Aerospace Science and Technology Corporation; 2014–2018 | Succeeded by Wu Yansheng |
| Preceded by Dong Qiang | Chairman of the Board of China Shipbuilding Industry Group; 2018–2019 | Succeeded by Position revoked |
| New title | Chairman of the Board of China State Shipbuilding Corporation; 2019–2022 | Succeeded by Wen Gang |
Party political offices
| Preceded by Jin Zhuanglong | Executive Deputy Director of the Office of the Central Military-Civil Fusion Development Committee; 2022–present | Incumbent |
