= Qi Yu =

Chinese politician

- 齐玉
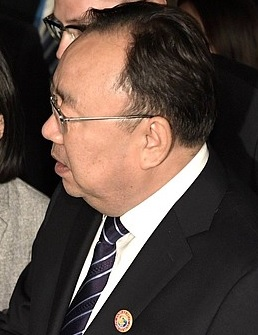

Party Secretary of the Ministry of Foreign Affairs

Personal details
- Born: April 1961 (age 65) Wuqi County, Shaanxi, China
- Party: Chinese Communist Party
- Education: Central Party School

Qi Yu
- Simplified Chinese: 齐玉
- Traditional Chinese: 齊玉
Transcriptions
Standard Mandarin
- Hanyu Pinyin: Qí Yù

Qi Yu (Chinese: 齐玉; pinyin: Qí Yù; born April 1961) is a Chinese politician serving since 2015 as the deputy head of the Organization Department of the Chinese Communist Party. Qi was formerly a provincial official in Jilin and Qinghai provinces.

== Biography ==
Qi was born in Wuqi County, Shaanxi province. He joined the Chinese Communist Party (CCP) in December 1982. He graduated from Northwest University of Politics and Law with a degree in philosophy, and later obtained a graduate degree from the Central Party School. He began his work in the Organization Department of the Shaanxi Provincial Committee of the CCP, then was named editor at Party Building Research, a publication of the Organization Department of the CCP. He was elevated to editor-in-chief of the publication in 2001. He also briefly served as the deputy party chief of Taiyuan. In November 2007, he was named Organization Department head of Qinghai province and a member of the provincial CCP Standing Committee.

In May 2013, Qi was named head of the provincial CCP Organization Department of Jilin.

He was named deputy head of the Organization Department of the CCP in December 2015. In January 2019, he was named Party Secretary of the Ministry of Foreign Affairs.

Party political offices
Preceded by Zhang Yasui	Party Secretary of the Ministry of Foreign Affairs; January 2019－	Incumbent
Preceded by Huang Yanming	Minister of the Organization Department of the Jilin Provincial Committee of the Chinese Communist Party; May 2013 – November 2015	Succeeded by Lin Wu
Preceded by Wang Qinfeng	Minister of the Organization Department of the Qinghai Provincial Committee of the Chinese Communist Party; November 2007－May 2013	Succeeded by Wang Lingjun
