= Wang Renhua =

Chinese general

- 王仁华

Secretary of the Political and Legal Affairs Commission of the Central Military Commission
- In office December 2019 – December 2025
- Preceded by: Song Dan

Personal details
- Born: 1962 (age 63–64) Santai County, Sichuan, China
- Party: Chinese Communist Party (expelled in 2026)

Military service
- Allegiance: People's Republic of China
- Branch/service: People's Liberation Army Navy
- Years of service: ?–2025
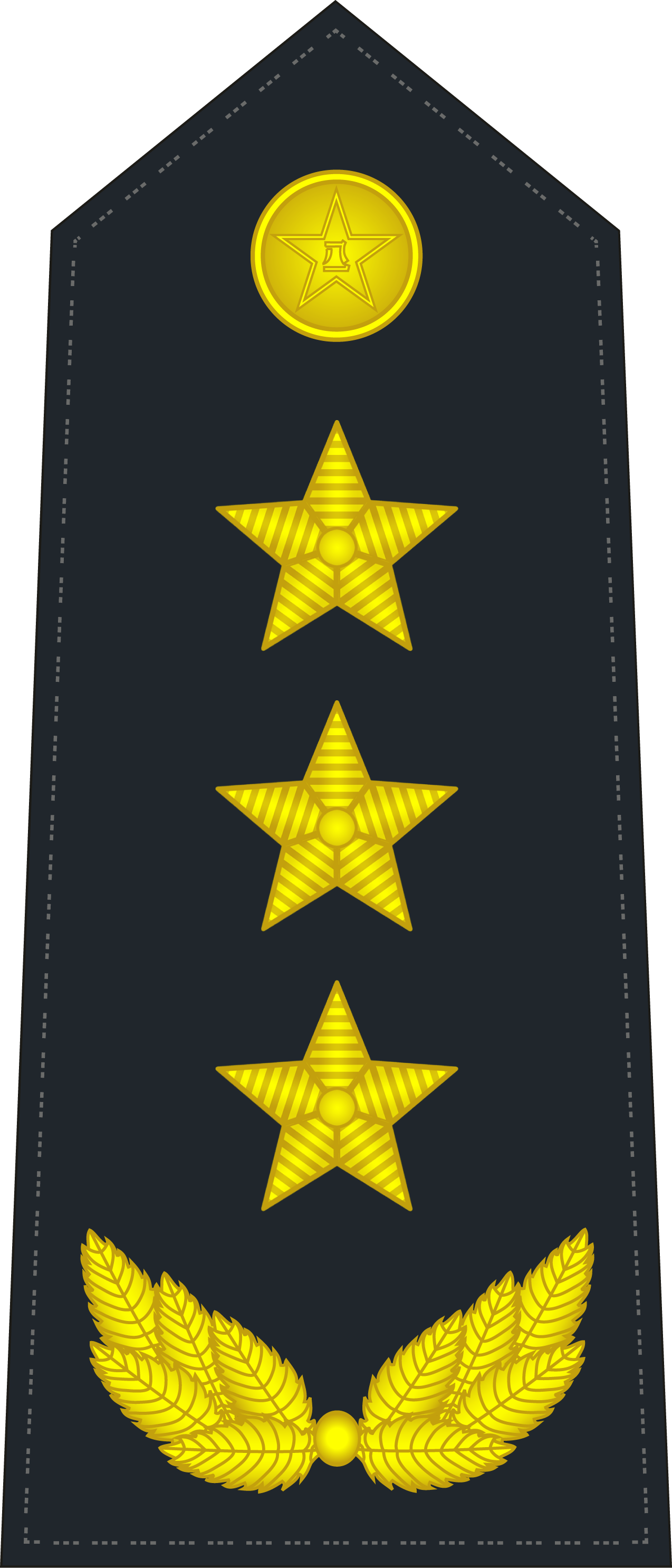
- Rank: Admiral

Chinese name
- Simplified Chinese: 王仁华
- Traditional Chinese: 王仁華
Transcriptions
Standard Mandarin
- Hanyu Pinyin: Wáng Rénhuá

Wang Renhua (Chinese: 王仁华; born 1962) was an admiral (Shangjiang) of the People's Liberation Army (PLA) who served as the secretary of the Political and Legal Affairs Commission of the Central Military Commission.

In October 2022, Wang was elected as a full member of the 20th Central Committee of the Chinese Communist Party. In October 2026, Wang was expelled from the Chinese Communist Party.

== Biography ==
Born in Santai County, Sichuan, in 1962, Wang served in the Political Work Bureau of the Equipment Development Department of the Central Military Commission before being appointed director of Political Department of Jiuquan Satellite Launch Center in 2012. In January 2015, he became director of the Political Department of the Army Equipment Research and Ordering Division of the Equipment Development Department of the Central Military Commission, but having held the position for only one year, then he was made deputy director of the PLA Army Political Work Department. In January 2017, he was secretary of Commission for Discipline Inspection of the East Sea Fleet, the party's agency in charge of anti-corruption efforts. In 2018, he became deputy secretary of the Political and Legal Affairs Commission of the Central Military Commission, rising to secretary in December 2019. In October 2022, Wang was elected as a full member of the 20th Central Committee of the Chinese Communist Party.

He was promoted to the rank of rear admiral (Shaojiang) in 2013, vice admiral (zhongjiang) in December 2019, and admiral (shangjiang) in March 2024.

== Downfall ==
On December 27, 2025, the Military Congress of the Political and Legal Committee of the Central Military Commission decided to remove Wang Renhua from his post as a deputy to the 14th National People's Congress. On 29 October 2026, the fifth plenary session of the 20th CCP Central Committee reviewed and approved the report of the Discipline Inspection Commission of the Central Military Commission on the "serious violations of discipline and law" by Wang and confirmed the Politburo decision to expel him from the CCP.

Military offices
Preceded by Song Dan	Secretary of the Political and Legal Affairs Commission of the Central Military Commission; 2019–2025	Succeeded by TBA
