= Zhao Xiaozhe =

Chinese general

- 赵晓哲

Personal details
- Born: 7 July 1963 (age 63) Dalian, Liaoning, China
- Party: Chinese Communist Party (expelled in 2026)
- Education: Dalian University of Technology

Military service
- Allegiance: People's Republic of China
- Branch/service: People's Liberation Army Navy
- Years of service: 2005–2026
- Rank: Vice admiral
- Scientific career
- Fields: Systems engineering
- Workplaces: Science and Technology Committee of the Central Military Commission

Chinese name
- Simplified Chinese: 赵晓哲
- Traditional Chinese: 趙曉哲
Transcriptions
Standard Mandarin
- Hanyu Pinyin: Zhào Xiǎozhé

Zhao Xiaozhe (Chinese: 赵晓哲; born 7 July 1963) is a vice admiral (zhongjiang) of the People's Liberation Army (PLA) who served as director of the Science and Technology Committee of the Central Military Commission. In October 2026, he was expelled from the Chinese Communist Party.

== Biography ==
Zhao was born in Dalian, Liaoning, on 7 July 1963. He earned a bachelor's degree in 1984, a master's degree in 1987, and a doctor's degree in 1992, all in systems engineering and all from Dalian University of Technology. Beginning in December 1992, he served in several posts in Dalian Naval Academy, including assistant, lecturer, associate professor, professor.

Zhao joined the People's Liberation Army Navy in February 2005. In June 2018, he became deputy director of the Science and Technology Committee of the Central Military Commission.

He was promoted to the rank of rear admiral (shaojiang) in August 2009.

On August 17, 2026, he was expelled from the Chinese Academy of Engineering.

On 29 October 2026, the fifth plenary session of the 20th CCP Central Committee reviewed and approved the report of the Discipline Inspection Commission of the Central Military Commission on the "serious violations of discipline and law" by Zhao and confirmed the Politburo decision to expel him from the CCP.

== Honours and awards ==
- 1996 State Science and Technology Progress Award (Third Class)
- 2004 State Science and Technology Progress Award (Second Class)
- 2006 State Science and Technology Progress Award (Second Class)
- 2009 State Science and Technology Progress Award (Second Class)
- 2011 Member of the Chinese Academy of Engineering (CAE)
