= Zhang Hongbing =

Chinese general

- 张红兵

Political Commissar of the People's Armed Police
- In office January 2022 – December 2025
- Preceded by: An Zhaoqing
- Succeeded by: TBA

Political Commissar of the Eastern Theater Command Ground Force
- In office December 2019 – January 2022
- Preceded by: Liao Keduo
- Succeeded by: Tang Xinghua

Political Commissar of the 76th Group Army
- In office March 2017 – December 2019
- Preceded by: New title
- Succeeded by: Vacant

Director of Political Department of the 20th Group Army
- In office 2014–2017
- Preceded by: Xue Jun
- Succeeded by: Position abolished

Personal details
- Born: January 1966 (age 60) Xianning, Hubei, China
- Party: Chinese Communist Party (expelled in 2026)

Military service
- Allegiance: People's Republic of China
- Branch/service: People's Liberation Army Ground Force
- Rank: General

Chinese name
- Traditional Chinese: 張紅兵
- Simplified Chinese: 张红兵
Transcriptions
Standard Mandarin
- Hanyu Pinyin: Zhāng Hóngbīng

Zhang Hongbing (Chinese: 张红兵; born January 1966) is a general (shangjiang) of the People's Liberation Army (PLA). He served as Political Commissar of the 76th Group Army from March 2017 to December 2019. Previously he served as Director of Political Department of the 20th Group Army from 2014 to 2017. In 2026, Zhang was expelled from the Chinese Communist Party.

== Biography ==
Zhang was born in Xianning, Hubei. He was Director of Political Department of the 20th Group Army in 2014, and held that office until 2017. In March 2017 he was promoted to become the Political Commissar of the 76th Group Army, a position he held until December 2019.

On December 10, 2019, he was awarded the military rank of lieutenant general (zhongjiang) by Central Military Commission chairman Xi Jinping. In December 2019, he was appointed political commissar of the Eastern Theater Command Ground Force, replacing Liao Keduo. In January 2022, he was appointed Political Commissar of the People's Armed Police and was promoted to the rank of general (shangjiang).

== Downfall ==
On December 27, 2025, the Armed Police Force Military Congress decided to remove Zhang Hongbing from his post as a deputy to the 14th National People's Congress. On 29 October 2026, the fifth plenary session of the 20th CCP Central Committee reviewed and approved the report of the Discipline Inspection Commission of the Central Military Commission on the "serious violations of discipline and law" by Zhang and confirmed the Politburo decision to expel him from the CCP.

Military offices
Preceded by Xue Jun (薛君)	Director of Political Department of the 20th Group Army; 2014–2017	Succeeded by Position abolished
New title	Political Commissar of the 76th Group Army; 2017–2019	Succeeded by Vacant
Preceded by Liao Keduo	Political Commissar of the Eastern Theater Command Ground Force; 2019–2022	Succeeded by TBA
Preceded by An Zhaoqing	Political Commissar of the People's Armed Police; 2022–2025	Succeeded by TBA
