= Zhang Youxia =

Chinese general (born 1950)

~~General~~ Zhang Youxia
- 张又侠
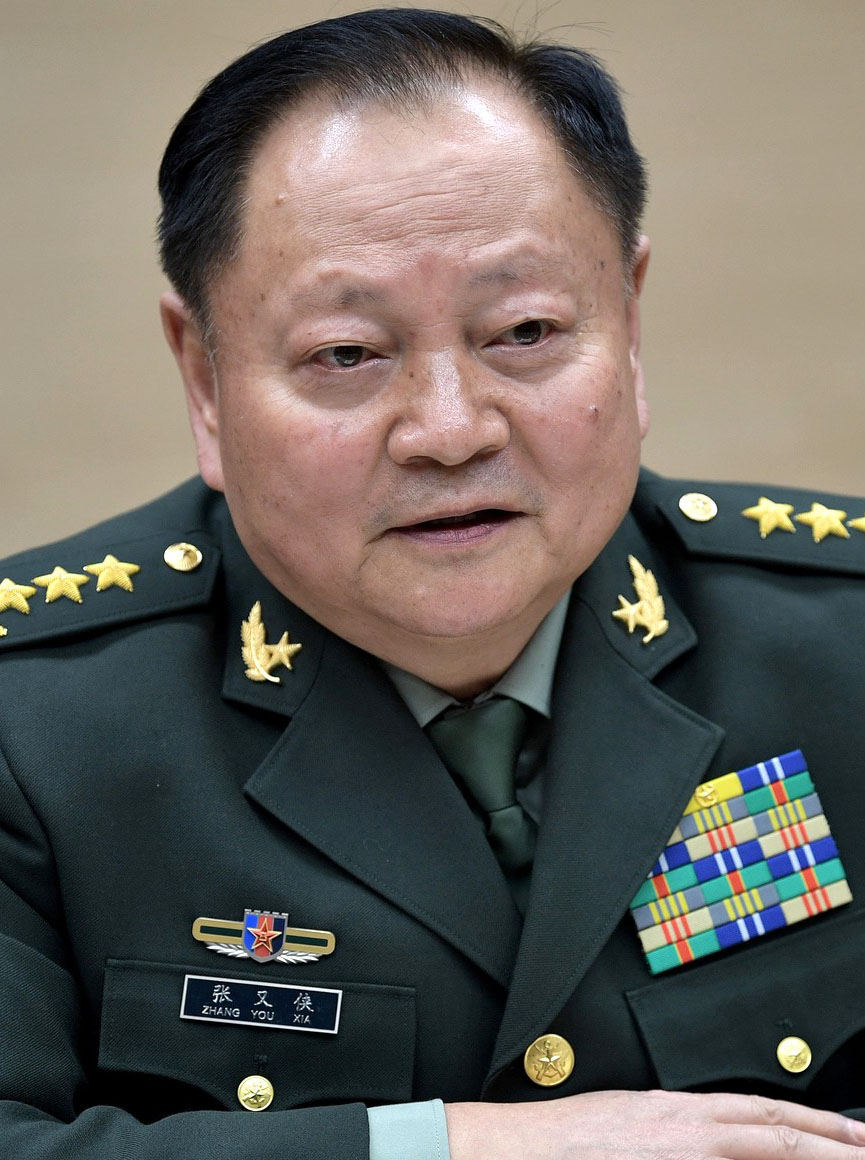
- Zhang in 2017

Vice Chairman of the Central Military Commission
- In office Party Commission: 25 October 2017 – 21 September 2026; State Commission: 19 March 2018 – 28 August 2026 Serving with Xu Qiliang, He Weidong and Zhang Shengmin
- Chairman: Xi Jinping

Head of the Equipment Development Department of the Central Military Commission
- In office January 2016 – August 2017
- Succeeded by: Li Shangfu

Head of the People's Liberation Army General Armaments Department
- In office October 2012 – January 2016
- Preceded by: Chang Wanquan

Personal details
- Born: July 1950 (age 76) Beijing, China
- Party: Chinese Communist Party (1969-2026, expelled)
- Parent: Zhang Zongxun
- Education: PLA Military Academy

Military service
- Allegiance: People's Republic of China
- Branch/service: People's Liberation Army Ground Force
- Years of service: 1968–2026
- Rank: General (Stripped in 2026)
- Unit: Central Military Commission; Central Leading Group for Military Reform
- Commands: CMC Equipment Development Department (2015–2017); PLA General Armaments Department (2012–2015); Shenyang Military Region (2007–2012); 13th Group Army (2000–2005)
- Battles/wars: Sino-Vietnamese War (1979); Battle of Lào Cai; Sino-Vietnamese border conflict (1979–1991); Laoshan Border War (1984–1993); Battle of Laoshan (1984)

Chinese name
- Simplified Chinese: 张又侠
- Traditional Chinese: 張又俠
Transcriptions
Standard Mandarin
- Hanyu Pinyin: Zhāng Yòuxiá

Zhang Youxia (Chinese: 张又侠; born July 1950) is a former Chinese general in the People's Liberation Army (PLA), who served as vice chairman of the Central Military Commission (CMC) and a member of the Politburo of the Chinese Communist Party (CCP) from 2017 until his downfall in 2026.

Born in Beijing, Zhang is the son of General Zhang Zongxun. Joining the army in 1968, Zhang fought in the Sino-Vietnamese War of 1979, and the Battle of Laoshan in 1984, making him one of the few serving generals in China with war experience. In 2000, he became commander of the 13th Group Army. In 2005, he became the vice commander of the Beijing Military Region. He was promoted to commander of the Shenyang Military Region in 2007, and became a member of the Central Committee of the Chinese Communist Party. In 2011, Zhang was promoted to General. In 2012, he was appointed as head of the PLA General Armaments Department. In 2016, he became the head of its successor, the CMC Equipment Development Department. In 2017, as member of the CCP Politburo, he became the second-ranked CMC vice chairman. In 2022, he became the first-ranked CMC vice chairman.

In January 2026, Zhang was detained and became one of the highest-ranking military officers to fall from power since the Lin Biao incident in 1971. In September 2026, he was expelled from the CCP by the Politburo, a decision confirmed by the Central Committee in October 2026.

== Early life and education ==
Zhang was born and raised in Beijing, but traces his ancestry to Yantou Village, Weinan, Shaanxi Province. He is the son of Zhang Zongxun, a Communist general in the Chinese Civil War, giving him princeling status. Zhang Youxia's father and CCP General Secretary Xi Jinping's father Xi Zhongxun both come from the Weinan region of Shaanxi and served in the First Field Army. His father participated with Mao Zedong in the Autumn Harvest Uprising (1927) and was a veteran of the Long March (1934–1936). During the Chinese Civil War, his father was a commander of the First Field Army, where Xi Jinping's father was political commissar. Zhang attended Beijing Jingshan School.

== Career ==
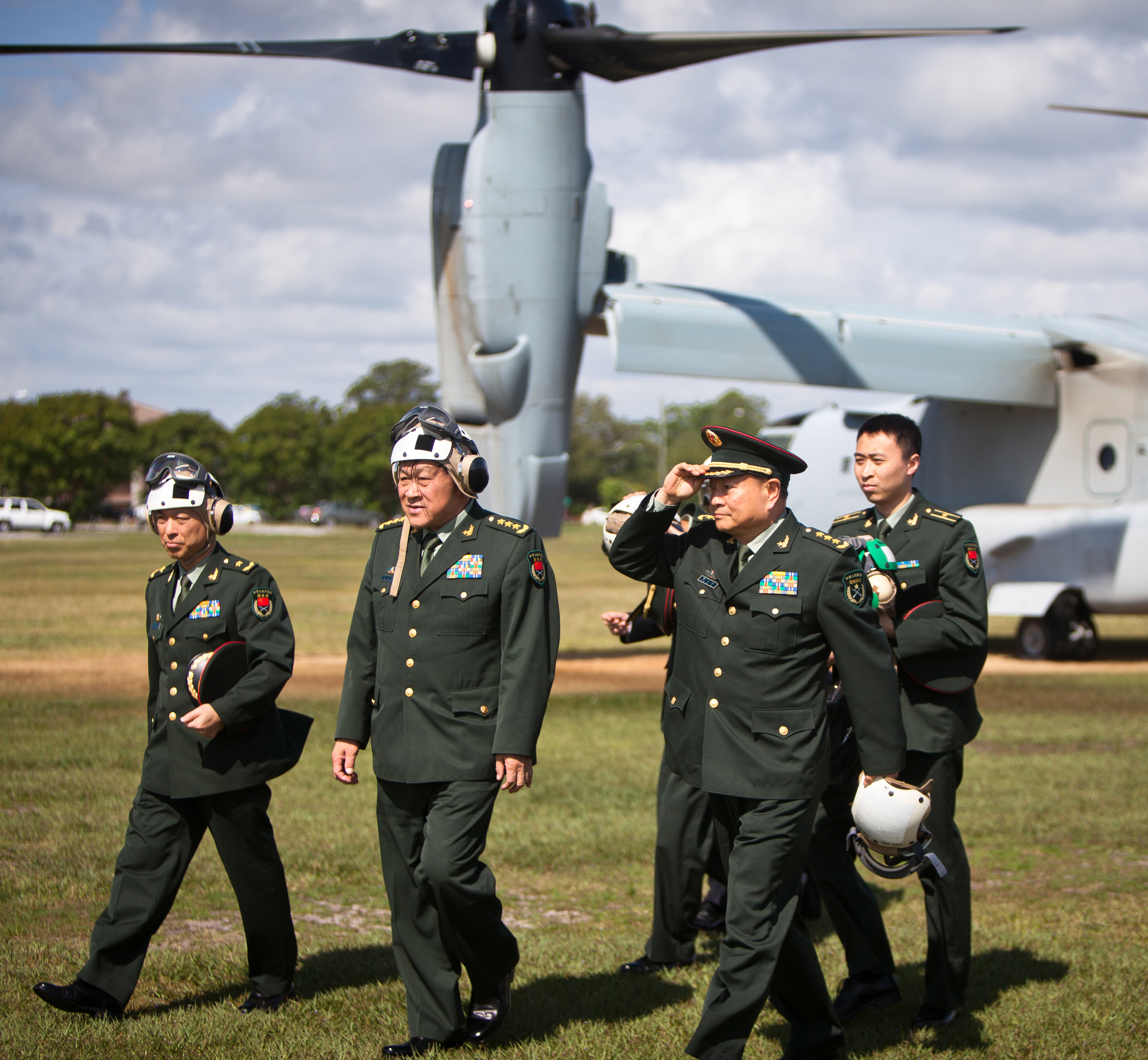
Gen. Liang Guanglie (second from left). and Gen. Zhang Youxia (right) visit USMC Base Camp Lejeune, NC, 9 May 2012

Zhang joined the army in December 1968 at 18 years of age. In 1976, he was serving in the 6th Company of the 119th Regiment of the 40th Division of the 14th Group Army, stationed in Yunnan province; and was rapidly promoted. In 1971, he was transferred to the headquarters of the 119th Regiment and served in the training section. After being promoted to officer in 1976, he returned to the grassroots unit and served as the company commander of the 8th Company of the 119th Regiment of the 40th Division of the 14th Army.

Zhang took part in the Sino-Vietnamese War of 1979. Because of his performance, he was promoted to the head of the training section of the 118th Regiment (at the battalion level) and later became the chief of staff of the 118th Regiment (at the deputy regimental level). In 1981, he was transferred to the 118th Regiment as deputy regimental commander. In 1983, he was transferred to the 119th Regiment as regimental commander. In 1984, he led his troops to participate in the Battle of Laoshan.

After the Battle of Laoshan, Zhang was immediately promoted to deputy commander of the 40th Division of the Army. However, due to the requirements of military reforms at the time, all officers at the regimental level and above needed to have military academy training before being promoted. He was assigned to study at the Basic Department of the Chinese People's Liberation Army Military Academy (now the People's Liberation Army National Defense University) and three years later, in 1987, obtained his associate degree. Only then did he officially return to the headquarters of the 40th Division to assume his new post. After the restoration of the military rank system in 1988, he was awarded the rank of colonel.

In 1990, Zhang was promoted to commander of the 40th Motorized Infantry Division and awarded the rank of senior colonel. In 1994, he was promoted to deputy commander of the 13th Group Army. In August 2000, he was named commander of the 13th Group Army. In December 2005, he became the vice commander of the Beijing Military Region. He was promoted to commander of the Shenyang Military Region in September 2007. He has been associated with National University of Defense Technology as an Adjunct Professor since 2010.

Zhang attained the rank of major general in 1997, and lieutenant general in 2007. He became a member of the Central Committee of the Chinese Communist Party in 2007. In July 2011, he was promoted to General. Prior to the 18th Party Congress held in 2012 (where he was a delegate), a wholesale re-shuffle of the PLA leadership took place. At the panel discussions of the party congress on the report of the General Secretary Hu Jintao, Zhang promised to accelerate the research and development of high-tech weapons and military equipment. He was tapped to replace Chang Wanquan as the director of the PLA General Armaments Department (later replaced by the Equipment Development Department also headed by Zhang). In November 2012, as was customary for the directors of the "four big departments" of the PLA, Zhang was named a member of the Central Military Commission. As director of the Equipment Development Department, he also headed China's human spaceflight program and was chief flight officer of the Shenzhou 10 spacecraft.

=== Vice Chairman of the Central Military Commission ===
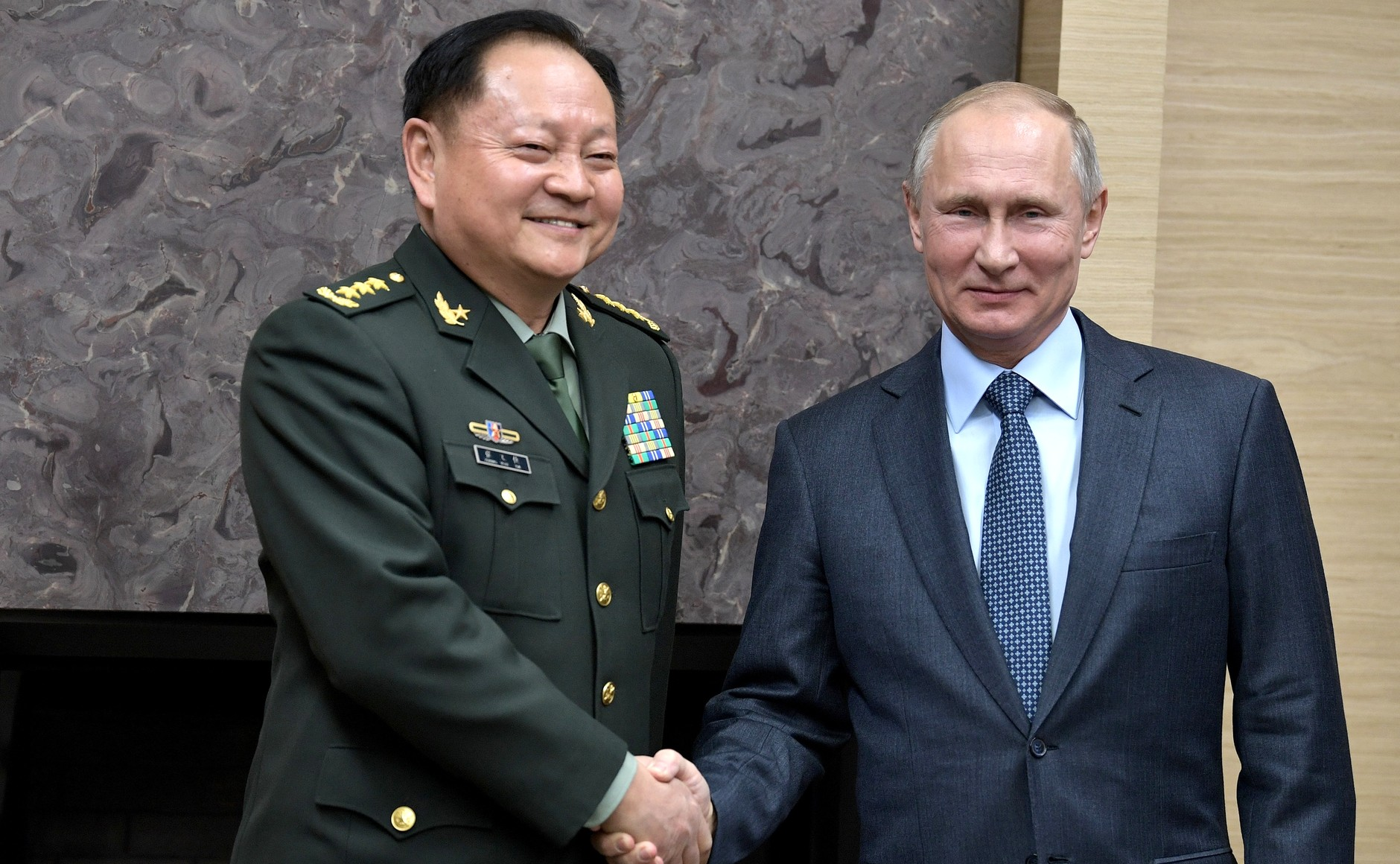
Vladimir Putin and Zhang Youxia (2017-12-07)

In October 2017, Zhang was named as a member of the Politburo of the Chinese Communist Party and the second-ranking vice chairman of the CCP Central Military Commission. He also became the vice chairman of the state CMC in March 2018. Zhang met with director of the General Political Bureau of the Korean People's Army Kim Su Gil in August 2019, where he told Kim that the delegation's visit as was of "crucial significance in bilateral exchange." According to South China Morning Post in November 2021, Zhang headed the anti-ship missile testing programme including a weapons-testing range with a mock-up US aircraft carrier. In January 2022, during a meeting of PLA's disciplinary officials, Zhang said the PLA should come up with innovative measures to eliminate corruption problems. He met with Pakistani Chief of Army Staff Qamar Javed Bajwa, where both sides pledged to increase military ties.

Although expected to retire under the CCP's informal retirement age of 68, Zhang remained on the Politburo following the 20th CCP National Congress in October 2022, and was re-appointed as the first-ranking CMC vice chairman. He was also re-appointed as PRC CMC vice-chairman in March 2023. In August 2023, Zhang told top military officials ensuring the quality of weaponry should be a top goal. In October 2023, Zhang addressed the Beijing Xiangshan Forum by saying the PLA would "show no mercy" against any moves towards Taiwan independence. He visited Russia in November 2023, meeting with Defense Minister Sergei Shoigu and President Vladimir Putin. At the 19th Western Pacific Naval Symposium in Qingdao in April 2024, Zhang called for abandoning "cold war mentality" and promised "firm countermeasures against unreasonable provocations" in the South China Sea.

In August 2024, Zhang met with US National Security Advisor Jake Sullivan, where he called on the US to "correct its strategic understanding of China, return to a rational and pragmatic policy toward China, [and] earnestly respect China's core interests". He visited Vietnam in October, where he met with Communist Party General Secretary Tô Lâm, President Lương Cường, Prime Minister Phạm Minh Chính and Defense Minister Phan Văn Giang, saying the two countries were "making new progress" in defense relations. The same month, he oversaw military readiness drills in Hebei. He also visited Pakistan in November, meeting with Chief of Army Staff Asim Munir. In November 2025, Zhang visited Russia, where he met with Russian Defense Minister Andrey Belousov.

== Downfall ==
Zhang disappeared from public view after November 2025. On 24 January 2026, the Ministry of National Defense announced that Zhang and Chief of Staff of the Joint Staff Department of the Central Military Commission Liu Zhenli were placed under investigation due to a decision by the CCP Central Committee over suspected "serious violations of discipline." The South China Morning Post reported Zhang was arrested on 19 January. It also reported that top CCP officials were briefed about Zhang's case on 23 January, and that Zhang was suspected of corruption, failing to rein in his close associates, family members and relatives and for not flagging problems to the party leadership at the first instance. The People's Liberation Army Daily published an editorial stating that Zhang and Liu had "severely trampled on and undermined the CMC Chairman responsibility system". These were more severe charges than the ones brought against He Weidong, former vice chairman of the CMC.

It is speculated that Zhang's downfall may be related to the 2023 Rocket Force corruption case, relating to his tenure as head of the Equipment Development Department (which succeeded the General Armaments Department) from 2016–2017. Zhang was one of the six military generals appointed by Xi Jinping to the CMC at the first plenary session of the 20th CPC Central Committee; all, except Zhang Shengmin, have since been removed under Xi's anti-corruption campaign including Zhang, Liu Zhenli, He Weidong, Miao Hua and Li Shangfu. Zhang's fall from power marked the most significant incident to hit the Chinese military leadership since the 1971 Lin Biao incident, with the move seen as consequential in Xi's centralization of power in the country.

The Wall Street Journal reported on 25 January that there was a briefing to the top military officials regarding Zhang on 24 January, in which it was said Zhang was put under investigation for allegedly forming political cliques, promoting Li Shangfu as defense minister in exchange for large bribes, and leaking core technical data on China's nuclear weapons to the United States. The Journal added that some evidence against Zhang had come from Gu Jun, the former general manager of the China National Nuclear Corporation who was also put under investigation. It also added authorities were investigating Zhang's previous leadership over the PLA General Armaments Department, and that Xi had dispatched a task force to Shenyang to investigate Zhang's tenure at the Shenyang Military Region, where the team was staying at local hotels rather than military bases, where Zhang might have a local network of support. On the other hand, The New York Times reported that Zhang was neither a spy for the U.S. government nor leaked China's nuclear secrets to the U.S., citing unnamed current and former U.S. officials.

K. Tristan Tang, an Associate Fellow at Secure Taiwan Associate Corporation and the Center for China Studies at National Taiwan University, published an analysis for Jamestown Foundation's China Brief. Analyzing publications and reports from the Ministry of National Defense, People's Daily, and PLA Daily, which had Zhang's version of force building priorities and Party's version respectively, and then especially the public readouts of their removal from office, Tang said that the corruption charges against Zhang and Liu were unlikely and stemmed from political accusations related to their disagreement or defiance with the CMC chairman responsibility system. According to Tang, they likely resisted Xi's demands that the PLA be capable of invading Taiwan by 2027, and instead took on a more steady approach in implementing reforms in military trainings that would achieve capacity to launch invasion of Taiwan by 2035. Tang commented that Zhang and Liu's professional military experience likely caused their difference in approach and strong difference in opinion from Xi. Tang said that the discord became visible as materials for the next training cycles made apparent the gap between realities on the ground and party directives. Tang thus conjectured that Zhang and Liu's resistance to Xi's 2027 timeline was the reason of their downfall.

On 28 August 2026, the Standing Committee of the National People's Congress removed Zhang from his position as a member of the state Central Military Commission. The NPCSC also removed Zhang as a delegate to the 14th National People's Congress. Zhang was expelled from the party and military service on 21 September 2026 by the Politburo. The investigation found that Zhang "formed self-serving cliques, were disloyal and dishonest to the Party, took advantage of their positions to assist others in promotions and accepted a huge sum of bribes in return". On 29 October 2026, the fifth plenary session of the 20th CCP Central Committee reviewed and approved the report of the Discipline Inspection Commission of the Central Military Commission on the "serious violations of discipline and law" by Zhang and confirmed the Politburo decision to expel him from the CCP.

== See also ==
- Officials implicated by the anti-corruption campaign in China (2022–)
- Xi Jinping faction

Military offices
Preceded by Gui Quanzhi	Commander of the 13th Group Army; 2000–2005	Succeeded by Wang Xixin
Preceded by Chang Wanquan	Commander of the Shenyang Military Region; 2007–2012	Succeeded by Wang Jiaocheng
Preceded by Chang Wanquan	Head of the People's Liberation Army General Armaments Department; 2012–2015	Succeeded by Position abolished
New title	Head of the Equipment Development Department of the Central Military Commission; 2015–2017	Succeeded by Li Shangfu
Party political offices
Preceded by Fan Changlong	Vice Chairman of the Central Military Commission of the Chinese Communist Party; 2017–2026	Succeeded by TBD
Government offices
Preceded by Fan Changlong	Vice Chairman of the Central Military Commission; 2018–2026	Succeeded by TBD
