= Liu Yazhou =

Chinese People's Liberation Army general (born 1952)

Air Force General Liu Yazhou
- 刘亚洲

Political Commissar of the PLA National Defence University
- In office December 2009 – 26 February 2017
- Preceded by: Tong Shiping
- Succeeded by: Wu Jieming

Political Commissar of the Chengdu Military Region Air Force
- In office January 2002 – December 2003
- Preceded by: Feng Yongsheng
- Succeeded by: Wang Yufa

Personal details
- Born: 19 October 1952 (age 74) Fenghua County, Zhejiang, China
- Party: Chinese Communist Party
- Spouse: Li Xiaolin
- Children: 1
- Education: Wuhan University

Military service
- Allegiance: People's Republic of China
- Branch/service: People's Liberation Army Ground Force
- Years of service: 1968–2017
- Rank: Air Force General

Chinese name
- Simplified Chinese: 刘亚洲
- Traditional Chinese: 劉亞洲
Transcriptions
Standard Mandarin
- Hanyu Pinyin: Liú Yǎzhōu

Liu Yazhou (Chinese: 刘亚洲; born 19 October 1952) is a former general of the Chinese People's Liberation Army Air Force (PLAAF), and the political commissar of the PLA National Defence University from 2009 to 2017. Liu is the son-in-law of former Chinese president Li Xiannian. He is known for his hawkish views on the defense and strategic posture he believes China should adopt. In 2023 he was given a suspended death sentence for corruption.

== Background and career ==
Liu was born in 1952 in Fenghua, Ningbo, Zhejiang. Liu Yazhou has been described as a "princeling": his father was a senior military officer and his father-in-law was Li Xiannian, one of the Chinese Communist Party's Eight Immortals and president of China in the era of Deng Xiaoping. This privileged political pedigree has given him a greater platform for his views and opinions. His writings "have dazzled as well as upset his readers; supporters praise his boldness and insight, and detractors condemn his alleged militarism and demagoguery."

Liu has written novels and essays to both acclaim and controversy. As a prominent military figure in China, he is unusual for his outspoken views and apparent violation of a number of taboos on political discourse.

At the same time, his prolific writing may have partly contributed to his rise through the ranks. He leans on the sayings of former Chinese leaders to make indirect criticisms of Chinese Communist Party policies. Unlike many PLA officials, Liu has traveled much overseas, including serving as a visiting professor at Stanford University.

In 2010 Liu was promoted by deputy political commissar of the PLA Air Force, to political commissar of NDU, the premier academic and defense research institute in China. Prior to that Liu was the director of the political division of the Beijing Military Region, the political commissar of the Chengdu Military Region's Air Force, and the deputy political commissar of the PLA Air Force.

News of Liu's sudden disappearance in 2021 until March 24, 2023, when the Hong Kong media Ming Pao reported that Liu might be given a heavier sentence of "death penalty with a two-year reprieve" (death sentence with reprieve) by the authorities due to his involvement in a serious corruption case. According to Ming Pao Daily News, Liu Yazhou is suspected of amassing huge wealth on behalf of foundations and associations and committing a serious corruption case, and may be given a heavy sentence of "death penalty with a two-year reprieve" by the authorities, and it is reported that Liu Yazhou is likely to spend the rest of his life in prison. Ming Pao also quoted a source as saying that Liu's wife, Li Xiaolin, daughter of former President Li Xiannian, was "safe and unaffected". China's "Red Culture Website" 红色文化 published a series of articles signed with the pseudonym "He Lanfeng", criticizing Liu Yazhou for advocating Western civilization's concepts of universal values such as "humanity, human rights, human nature, democracy, and freedom", and for being "a typical ambitious and conspiratorial person." On 13 April 2023, Sing Tao Daily reported that the Discipline Inspection Commission of the Central Military Commission (CMCDI) had completed its investigation into Liu Yazhou around the Spring Festival of 2023, and that Liu Yazhou had been double-expelled and also transferred to the military's judicial system for processing. At the same time, the Chinese military issued a notice in late February 2023 requiring the removal of "Liu Yazhou's harmful information" in March, and requesting all units to remove books, newspapers, periodicals, articles, inscriptions, speeches, etc. involving Liu Yazhou by way of self-checking against the "Statistical Table of Liu-Related Information".[9] The Chinese military also issued a notice in late February 2023 requiring the removal of "Liu Yazhou's harmful information" in March.

== Comments on democracy and reform ==
Liu Yazhou made headlines in the West in 2010 when he made a series of public remarks about democracy in China. "Democracy is the most urgent; without it there is no sustainable rise. Ideals of democracy are not restricted by national borders, or by historical ones," he said in August 2010, in an article in the Hong Kong magazine Phoenix Weekly.

Remarks like this led to Liu gaining a reputation as an "outspoken" and "reformist" general.

"If a system fails to let its citizens breathe freely and release their creativity to the maximum extent, and fails to place those who best represent the system and its people into leadership positions, it is certain to perish," he wrote.

In an alleged internal speech in August 2013, Liu argues that reforms in China are now in "deep water" and that the country can no longer "cross the river by feeling for stones," as Party patriarch Deng Xiaoping put it in the early period of growth of the 1990s. Liu suggests that further reforms require political change, and ultimately even competitive elections.

== Hawkish stance ==
Liu's hawkishness can also differ from the more explicitly militarized claims of propaganda figures like Dai Xu and Zhang Zhaozhong. In an essay titled "The Grand National Strategy" written in the wake of the September 11 terrorist attacks, Liu argued against taking advantage of the fallout of the attack to attempt to conquer Taiwan. He advocated "diplomacy over fighting," and suggested the exploitation of Taiwan's political system over strongarm tactics.

For this, analyst Alfred L. Chan calls him a "nationalist and a realist."

== Personal life ==
Liu's wife is Li Xiaolin, daughter of Li Xiannian, the President of China under Deng Xiaoping's leadership.

== Selected works ==
- Win in Air Supremacy (赢在制空权), 2014.
- Considerations on the War Dead in the First Sino-Japanese War (甲午殇思), 2014.
- ' 'Foreword to Liu Mingfu, China Dream ISBN 978-1627741408, 2015

Military offices
Preceded by Feng Yongsheng	Political Commissar of the Chengdu Military Region Air Force; 2002–2003	Succeeded by Wang Yufa
Preceded by Tong Shiping	Political Commissar of the PLA National Defence University; 2009–2017	Succeeded by Wu Jieming
