= Li Huohui =

- 黎火辉

Deputy Commander of the People's Liberation Army Ground Force
- Incumbent
- Assumed office December 2021
- Commander: Liu Zhenli

Personal details
- Born: October 1963 (age 62–63) Fengcheng County, Jiangxi, China
- Party: Chinese Communist Party
- Education: PLA National Defence University

Military service
- Allegiance: People's Republic of China
- Branch/service: People's Liberation Army Ground Force
- Years of service: ?–present
- Rank: Lieutenant general

Chinese name
- Simplified Chinese: 黎火辉
- Traditional Chinese: 黎火輝
Transcriptions
Standard Mandarin
- Hanyu Pinyin: Lí Huǒhuī

Li Huohui (Chinese: 黎火辉; born October 1963) is a lieutenant general in the People's Liberation Army of China.

He is a representative of the 19th National Congress of the Chinese Communist Party and a member of the 19th Central Committee of the Chinese Communist Party. He is a delegate to the 13th National People's Congress.

== Biography ==
Li was born in the town of Tuochuan in Fengcheng County (now Fengcheng), Jiangxi, in October 1963. He served in the Nanjing Military Region and Fujian Military District for a long time. In January 2011, he rose to become chief of staff of the 12th Group Army, a position he held until 2015, when he was commissioned as commander of the 31st Group Army. He became head of the Training and Administration Department of the Central Military Commission in January 2017, and served until December 2021, while he was made deputy commander of the People's Liberation Army Ground Force.

He was promoted to the rank of major general (shaojiang) in 2012 and lieutenant general (zhongjiang) in 2018.

Military offices
Preceded by Ma Chengxiao	Commander of the 31st Group Army; 2015–2017	Succeeded by Hu Zhongqiang
Preceded by Zheng He	head of the Training and Administration Department of the Central Military Commission; 2017–2021	Succeeded by Wang Peng (lieutenant general)
