= Xu Xueqiang =

General of the People's Liberation Army

- 许学强
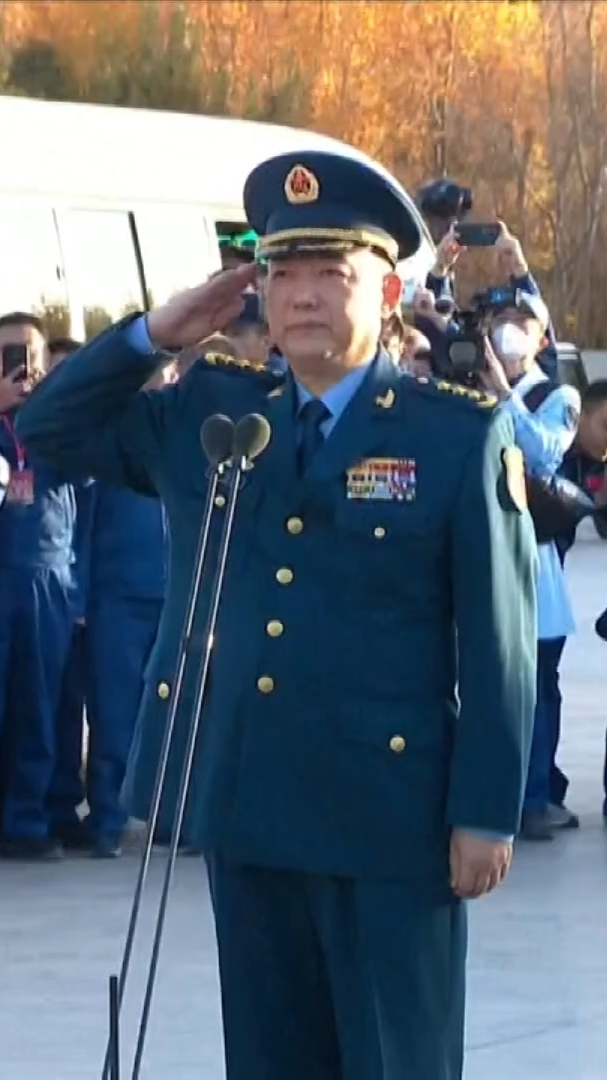
- Xu at the see-off ceremony for Chinese astronauts of Shenzhou 17 mission

Director of the Equipment Development Department
- In office October 2022 – June 2026
- Preceded by: Li Shangfu

President of PLA National Defence University
- In office August 2021 – October 2022
- Preceded by: Zheng He
- Succeeded by: Xiao Tianliang

Commander of Northern Theater Command Air Force
- In office November 2017 – August 2021
- Preceded by: Ding Laihang
- Succeeded by: Liu Wenqi

Chief of Staff of Eastern Theater Command Air Force
- In office 2016 – August 2017

Chief of Staff of Nanjing Military Region Air Force
- In office December 2013 – 2016
- Preceded by: Huang Guoxian
- Succeeded by: Position revoked

Personal details
- Born: November 1962 (age 63) Yiyang, Hunan, China
- Party: Chinese Communist Party

Military service
- Allegiance: People's Republic of China
- Branch/service: People's Liberation Army Air Force
- Years of service: ?–present
- Rank: General

Chinese name
- Simplified Chinese: 许学强
- Traditional Chinese: 許學強
Transcriptions
Standard Mandarin
- Hanyu Pinyin: Xǔ Xuéqiáng

Xu Xueqiang (Chinese: 许学强; born November 1962) is a general (shangjiang) of the People's Liberation Army (PLA), serving as head of the Equipment Development Department of the Central Military Commission since October 2022. He was the president of PLA National Defence University from 2021 to 2022 and previously served as commander of Northern Theater Command Air Force and before that, chief of staff of Nanjing Military Region Air Force.

== Biography ==
Xu was born in Yiyang, Hunan province in November 1962. He served in PLA Air Force Shanghai Base before being appointed as chief of staff of Nanjing Military Region Air Force in December 2013. In 2016, he was appointed chief of staff of the newly founded Eastern Theater Command Air Force, a position he held until August 2017, when he was transferred to Northern Theater Command Air Force and appointed commander. In August 2021, he was appointed president of PLA National Defence University, succeeding Zheng He.

He was promoted to the rank of major general (shaojiang) in 2013, lieutenant general (zhongjiang) in June 2019 and general (shangjiang) in September 2021.

On 26 June 2026, the Standing Committee of the National People's Congress removed Xu as a delegate to the 14th National People's Congress.

Military offices
Preceded by Huang Guoxian	Chief of Staff of Nanjing Military Region Air Force; 2013–2016	Succeeded by Position revoked
New title	Chief of Staff of Eastern Theater Command Air Force; 2016–2017	Succeeded by Unpublished
Preceded by Ding Laihang	Commander of Northern Theater Command Air Force; 2017–2021	Succeeded by Liu Wenqi
Preceded by Zheng He	President of PLA National Defence University; 2021–2022	Succeeded by Xiao Tianliang
Preceded by Li Shangfu	Commander of the China Manned Space Program; 2022–present	Incumbent
Preceded by Li Shangfu	Head of the Equipment Development Department of the Central Military Commission; 2022–present	Incumbent
