= Zheng He (general) =

Chinese army general (born 1958)

- 郑和

Political Commissar of the PLA National Defense University
- Incumbent
- Assumed office August 2021
- Preceded by: Wu Jieming

President of PLA National Defense University
- In office June 2017 – August 2021
- Preceded by: Zhang Shibo
- Succeeded by: Xu Xueqiang

President of PLA Academy of Military Science
- In office January 2017 – July 2017
- Preceded by: Cai Yingting
- Succeeded by: Yang Xuejun

Personal details
- Born: November 1958 (age 67) Shanghai, China
- Party: Chinese Communist Party
- Education: Combined Arms Academy of the Armed Forces of the Russian Federation

Military service
- Allegiance: People's Republic of China
- Branch/service: People's Liberation Army Ground Force
- Years of service: ?–present
- Rank: General

Chinese name
- Simplified Chinese: 郑和
- Traditional Chinese: 鄭和
Transcriptions
Standard Mandarin
- Hanyu Pinyin: Zhèng Hé
Wu
- Wugniu: Zen^{6} Wu^{6}

Zheng He (Chinese: 郑和; born November 1958) is a general (shangjiang) of the People's Liberation Army who served as president of PLA National Defense University from 2017 to 2021. He is a member of the 19th Central Committee of the Chinese Communist Party and was a delegate to the 12th National People's Congress.

== Biography ==
Born in Shanghai, in November 1958, he graduated from the Combined Arms Academy of the Armed Forces of the Russian Federation. He served in the Nanjing Military Region for a long time. His first assignment was as chief of staff of the 31st Group Army followed by service at Nanjing Military Region as deputy chief of staff. He then received an assignment as director of Military Training Division of the People's Liberation Army General Staff Department in 2013. In July 2015 he transferred to the Chengdu Military Region as deputy commander. He was then assigned to the newly founded Training and Administration Department of the Central Military Commission as director in January 2016. One year later, he was appointed president of PLA Academy of Military Science, replacing Cai Yingting. He became president of PLA National Defense University in June 2017, serving in the post until his retirement in 2021.

He was promoted to the rank of major general (shaojiang) in 2009 and lieutenant general (zhongjiang) in July 2016. On 31 July 2019, he was awarded the military rank of general (shangjiang) by Chairman Xi Jinping.

Military offices
Preceded by Chen Zhaohai	Director of Military Training Division of the People's Liberation Army General Staff Department; 2013–2016	Succeeded by Position revoked
New title	Director of Training and Administration Department of the Central Military Commission; 2016–2017	Succeeded by Li Huohui
Preceded by Cai Yingting	President of PLA Academy of Military Science; 2017–2017	Succeeded by Yang Xuejun
Preceded by Zhang Shibo	President of PLA National Defense University; 2017–2021	Succeeded by Xu Xueqiang
