= Li Shangfu =

Chinese military administrator (born 1958)

- 李尚福
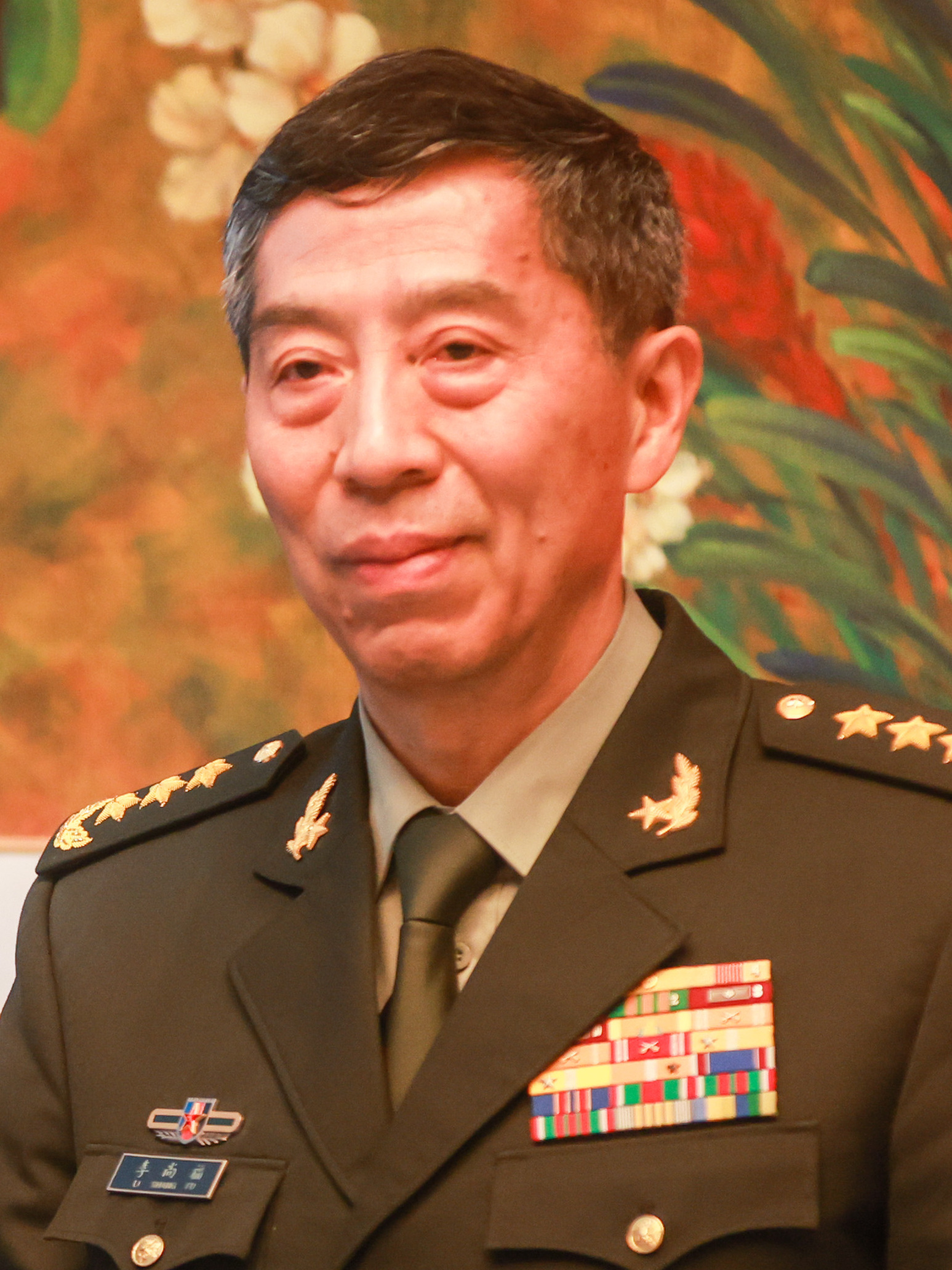
- Li in 2023

State Councilor of China
- In office 12 March 2023 – 24 October 2023 Serving with Wang Xiaohong, Wu Zhenglong, Shen Yiqin, and Qin Gang
- Premier: Li Qiang

13th Minister of National Defense
- In office 12 March 2023 – 24 October 2023
- Premier: Li Qiang
- CMC Chairman: Xi Jinping
- Preceded by: Wei Fenghe
- Succeeded by: Dong Jun

Head of the Equipment Development Department
- In office September 2017 – October 2022
- Preceded by: Zhang Youxia
- Succeeded by: Xu Xueqiang

Commander of the China Manned Space Program
- In office September 2017 – October 2022
- Preceded by: Zhang Youxia
- Succeeded by: Xu Xueqiang

Personal details
- Born: February 1958 (age 68) Chengdu, Sichuan, China
- Party: Chinese Communist Party (1980–2024; expelled)
- Education: National University of Defense Technology; Chongqing University (EngD)

Military service
- Allegiance: China
- Branch/service: People's Liberation Army Ground Force; People's Liberation Army Strategic Support Force
- Years of service: 1982–2024
- Rank: General (stripped in 2024)

Li Shangfu (Chinese: 李尚福; pinyin: Lǐ Shàngfú; born February 1958) is a Chinese aerospace engineer and former military administrator. He served as the 13th Minister of National Defense and as State Councillor of China from March to October 2023.

Li joined the People's Liberation Army (PLA) as a technician at the Xichang Satellite Launch Center in 1982. He spent 31 years working at the Xichang Satellite Launch Center, including 10 years as the center director. Li Shangfu served as deputy director of the PLA General Armaments Department from 2014 to 2016 and director of the Equipment Development Department of the Central Military Commission (CMC) from 2017 to 2022. He was conferred the rank of General in July 2019 and was appointed as a member of the CMC in October 2022. He was appointed as the 13th Minister of National Defense and as State Councillor in March 2023.

In August 2023, Li disappeared from public view and was then removed from office on October 24, 2023. He is both the shortest-serving Minister of National Defense and the first from the PLA Strategic Support Force. In June 2024, he was expelled from the Chinese Communist Party (CCP) following corruption charges and his case transferred to the military's judiciary for criminal prosecution, and his rank of General revoked. In May 2026, Li was sentenced to death with a two-year reprieve, which will be commuted to life imprisonment without the possibility of parole upon the expiration of the two-year reprieve period.

== Early life ==
Li Shangfu was born in February 1958 in Chengdu, Sichuan Province, with his ancestral home in Xingguo County, Jiangxi Province. He is the son of Li Shaozhu, a Red Army veteran and former high-ranking officer of the PLA Railway Force. Li Shangfu joined the PLA when he entered the National University of Defense Technology in 1978, and joined the CCP in June 1980. After graduating in 1982, he began working at the Xichang Satellite Launch Center as a technician.

Li attained a Doctor of Engineering in control theory and control engineering from Chongqing University.

== Career ==
In December 2003, he was promoted to Director (Commander) of the center at the age of 45. In 2006, he attained the rank of major general. In his ten years as director of the Xichang center, Li oversaw several rocket launches, including the launch of the Chang'e 2 lunar probe in October 2010.

After 31 years working in Xichang, Li was appointed Chief of Staff of the PLA General Armaments Department (GAD) in 2013, replacing Major General Shang Hong. A year later, he was made deputy director of the GAD.

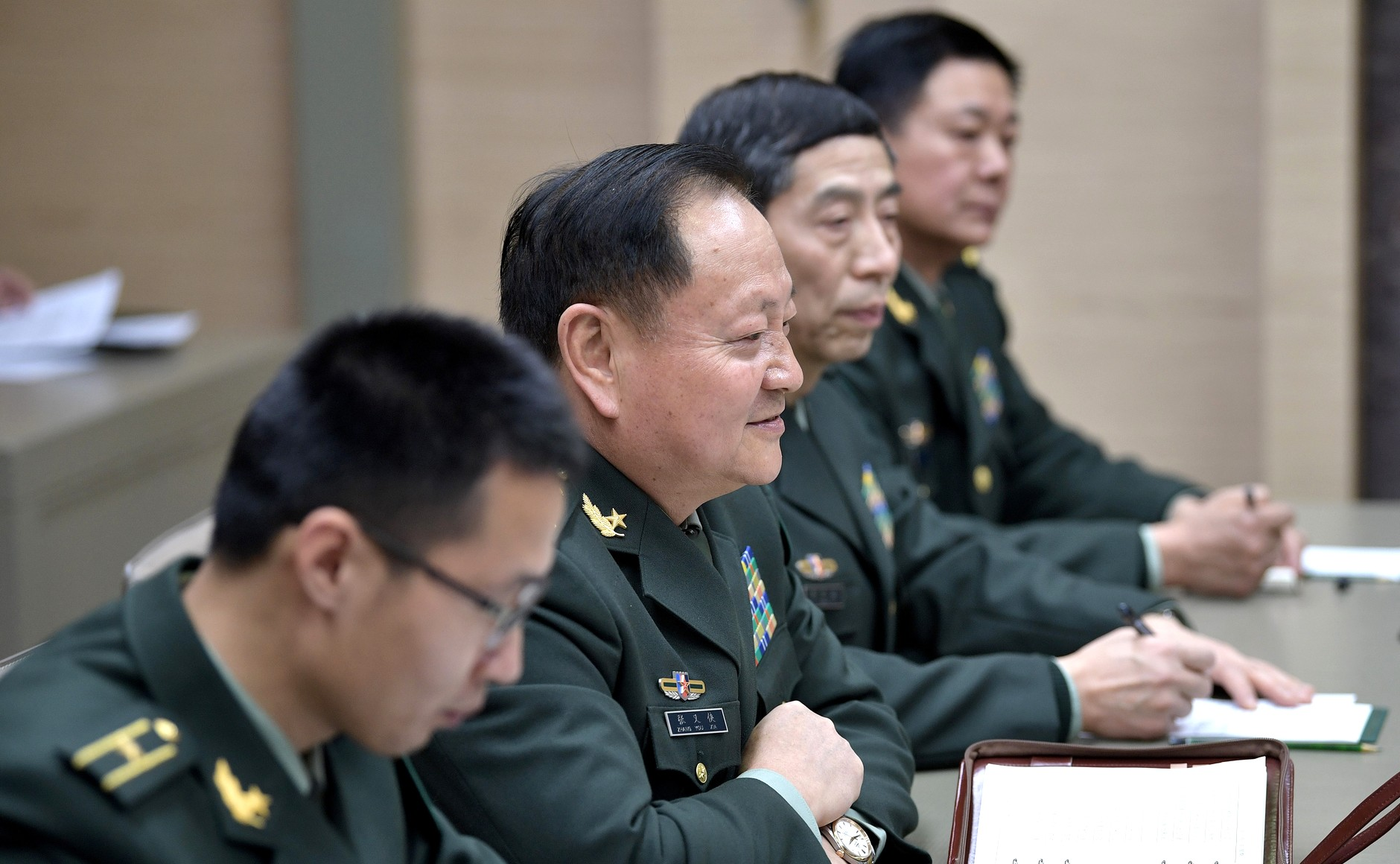
Zhang Youxia, Li and the Chinese delegation in Moscow, Russia in 2017

In 2016, Li was appointed Deputy Commander of the newly established PLA Strategic Support Force, which is responsible for cyberspace, space, and other high-tech warfare. He was promoted to the rank of lieutenant general in the same year. In September 2017, Li was appointed Director of the Equipment Development Department of the CMC, the successor department of the GAD, replacing General Zhang Youxia.

In October 2017, Li was elected a member of the 19th CCP Central Committee.

Li Shangfu was conferred the rank of major general in July 2006. In August 2016, he was conferred the rank of lieutenant general. In July 2019, he was conferred the rank of general.

=== Central Military Commission ===
In October 2022, he was nominated as a member of the 20th CMC of the CCP by Party general secretary Xi Jinping. He ranked first among the members of the CMC.

On January 18, 2023, Li Shangfu attended the CMC promotion ceremony, and was appointed State Councilor and Minister of National Defense on March 12 of the same year, succeeding Wei Fenghe. According to The Diplomat, Li's promotion reflects Chinese attempts to prioritize aerospace in its defense modernization program, against a backdrop of increasing technological competition between China and the United States.

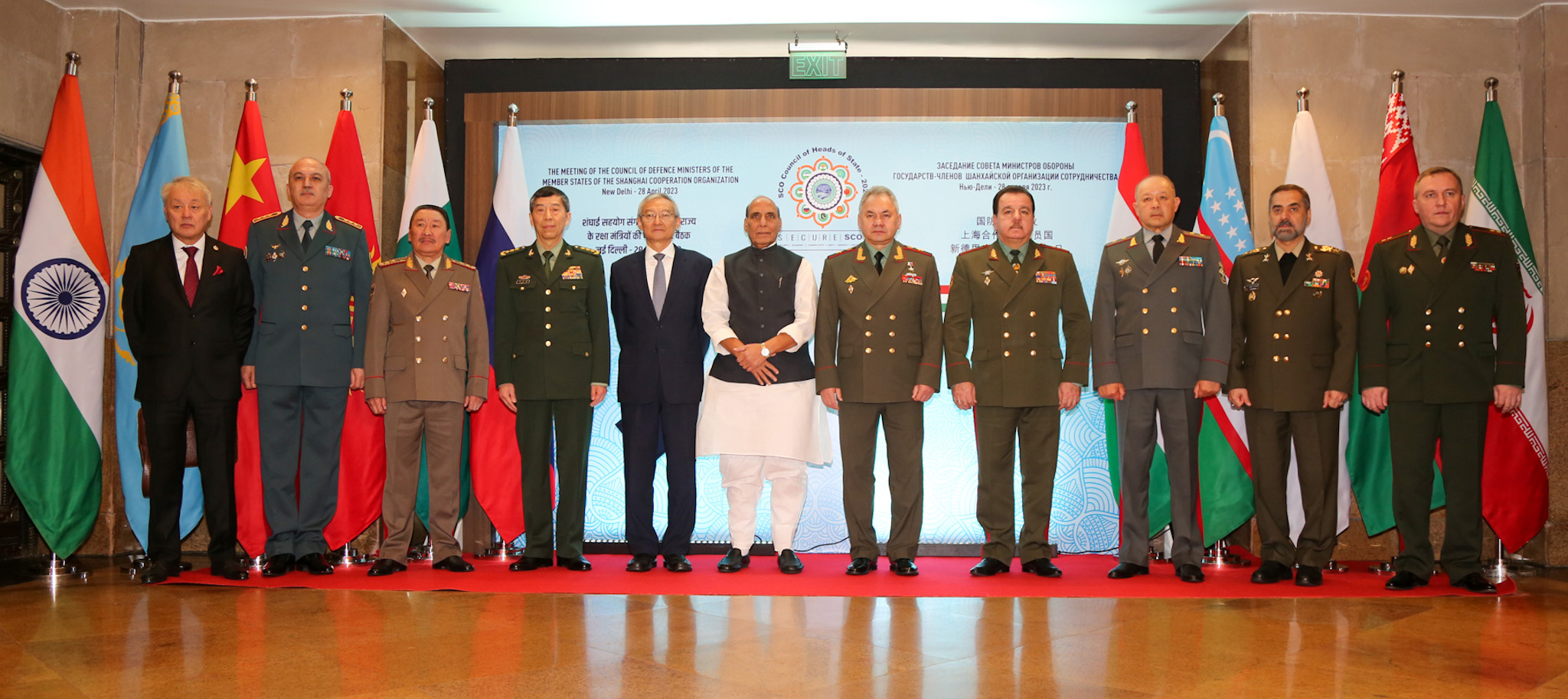
Li at the SCO defense ministers' meeting in New Delhi, India, 28 April 2023

On April 17, 2023, Li made his first overseas visit to Russia. As part of his four-day visit, he met with Russian president Vladimir Putin and Defense Minister Sergei Shoigu in Moscow. During his meeting, he stated the ties between China and Russia 'surpass military-political alliances of the Cold War era'. On April 28, he met with Indian Minister of Defense Rajnath Singh as part of the Shanghai Cooperation Organisation defense ministers' meeting in New Delhi, India, making it the first visit to India by a Chinese Defense Minister since the 2020 border skirmishes between Indian and Chinese troops.

In June 2023, at the 2023 IISS Shangri-La Dialogue in Singapore, Li made public comments stating that war with the United States would be an unbearable disaster and that both the United States and China needed to seek more common ground in the wake of recent escalations between the two countries.

=== Downfall ===
In September 2023, Reuters reported that Li was under anti-corruption investigations by the Commission for Discipline Inspection of the CMC (CMCCDI). His absence had been observed and speculated on by U.S. government officials, who told the Financial Times they believed that Li was under investigation.

On 24 October 2023, the sixth meeting of the Standing Committee of the 14th National People's Congress (NPC) decided to remove Li Shangfu from the posts of State Councilor and Minister of National Defense and remove Qin Gang from the post of State Councilor. He was also removed from the CMC. With a tenure of seven months, Li is the shortest-serving minister of national defense of the People's Republic of China. His last public appearance was on 29 August 2023, when he delivered a speech at a security forum with African nations held in Beijing. On 4 March 2024, NPC spokesperson Lou Qinjian announced Li was no longer a delegate to the NPC, though there had been no official announcements on Li's dismissal or resignation until 13 September 2024, when the Standing Committee of the 14th NPC announced Li's dismissal.

On 27 June 2024, the CCP Politburo announced that Li, along with former defense minister Wei Fenghe, have been expelled from the party for "disciplinary and law violations", and the case has been referred to the PLA's procuratorial organs for criminal prosecution, with Li being accused of accepting financial bribes as well as bribing others. Both the men were also stripped of their rank of general. In July 2024, the 3rd Plenary Session of the 20th CCP Central Committee confirmed the decision to expel Li. In January 2026, The Wall Street Journal reported that an internal briefing regarding CMC Vice Chairman Zhang Youxia linked the investigation on him to Li, with Zhang allegedly helping elevate Li in exchange of large bribes.

On 7 May 2026, Li was sentenced to death with a two-year reprieve over accepting and offering bribes, and no further commutation or parole will be allowed after their penalties are commuted to life imprisonment upon the expiration of the two-year reprieve period. On 8 May 2026, the People's Liberation Army Daily posted an editorial which stated "The military wields the gun and there must be no one who harbours disloyalty to the party" and added "As senior party and military leaders, Wei and Li showed a collapse of faith and a loss of loyalty, betraying their original aspirations and missions and abandoning party principles". It added that Wei and Li had betrayed the trust and expectations of the CCP Central Committee and the Central Military Commission, "severely polluted the political environment of the military, and caused immense damage to the party's cause, national defence, military construction and the image of senior leaders".

== Controversies ==
=== U.S. sanctions ===
On 20 September 2018, Li Shangfu, along with the Equipment Development Department, were sanctioned by the U.S. government for "engaging in significant transactions with persons" sanctioned under United States federal law CAATSA, namely for transactions that involved "Russia's transfer to China of Su-35 combat aircraft and S-400 surface-to-air missile system-related equipment." As a result, he is included in the Specially Designated Nationals and Blocked Persons List. Despite the sanctions imposed on him by the United States, he would be allowed to conduct official meetings with his American counterparts although an exemption would not be issued to waive his sanction designation.

On 21 May 2023, U.S. President Joe Biden stated that his administration was considering lifting sanctions on Li, though later in a press briefing on 22 May, U.S. State Department spokesperson Matthew Miller stated that the United States is not considering lifting sanctions.

== See also ==
- Officials implicated by the anti-corruption campaign in China (2022–)

Military offices
Preceded by Xu Hongliang	Director of the Xichang Satellite Launch Center; 2003–2013	Succeeded by Zhang Zhenzhong
Preceded by Shang Hong	Chief of Staff of the Headquarters of the General Armament Department of the People's Liberation Army; 2013–2014	Succeeded by Fei Jiabing
New title	Chief of Staff of the People's Liberation Army Strategic Support Force; 2016–2017	Succeeded by Rao Kaixun
Preceded by Zhang Youxia	Commander of the China Manned Space Program; 2017–2022	Succeeded by Xu Xueqiang
Preceded by Zhang Youxia	Head of the Equipment Development Department of the Central Military Commission; 2017–2022	Succeeded by Xu Xueqiang
Government offices
Preceded by General Wei Fenghe	Minister of National Defense; 2023	Succeeded by Admiral Dong Jun
