= Qian Weiping =

Chinese military scientist and former major general

- 钱卫平
- Born: 1963 (age 62–63); Yixing, Jiangsu, China
- Military career
- Allegiance: People's Republic of China
- Branch: People's Liberation Army Ground Force
- Rank: Major general
- Commands: Deputy director of Equipment Development Department of the Central Military Commission

Qian Weiping (simplified Chinese: 钱卫平; traditional Chinese: 錢衛平; pinyin: Qián Wèipíng; born 1963) is a Chinese military scientist and a former major general in the People's Liberation Army (PLA). An expert in space tracking, telemetry and command, he served as President of Beijing Institute of Tracking and Telecommunications Technology and Deputy Director of the Equipment Development Department of the Central Military Commission. In July 2019, he was placed under investigation by the PLA's anti-corruption agency.

== Education ==
Qian was born in the town of Yicheng, Yixing, Jiangsu in 1963. He graduated from National University of Defense Technology.

== Career ==
In March 2016, he became the head of Information System Bureau of Equipment Development Department of the Central Military Commission. In April 2019, he was appointed deputy director of Equipment Development Department of the Central Military Commission, which oversaw the design of the space programme's telemetry, tracking and command systems for China's manned space program and the Chang'e 1 and Chang'e 2 lunar exploration programs.

== Investigation ==
In July 2019, he was placed under investigation by the PLA's anti-corruption agency.
