= Wu Jieming =

- 吴杰明

Political Commissar of the PLA National Defence University
- In office June 2017 – August 2021
- Preceded by: Liu Yazhou
- Succeeded by: Zheng He

Personal details
- Born: June 1958 (age 68) Huangchuan County, Henan, China
- Party: Chinese Communist Party
- Education: Second Artillery Force Academy; PLA National Defence University

Military service
- Allegiance: People's Republic of China
- Branch/service: People's Liberation Army Ground Force
- Years of service: 1976–2021
- Rank: Lieutenant general

Chinese name
- Simplified Chinese: 吴杰明
- Traditional Chinese: 吳傑明
Transcriptions
Standard Mandarin
- Hanyu Pinyin: Wú Jiémíng

Wu Jieming (Chinese: 吴杰明; born June 1958) is a lieutenant general in the People's Liberation Army of China who was political commissar of the PLA National Defence University from 2017 to 2021.

He was a member of the 18th Central Commission for Discipline Inspection. He was a representative of the 19th National Congress of the Chinese Communist Party and an alternate of the 19th Central Committee of the Chinese Communist Party. He is a delegate to the 13th National People's Congress.

== Biography ==
Wu was born in Huangchuan County, Henan, in June 1958. After high school in 1975, he became a sent-down youth during the late Cultural Revolution. He enlisted in the People's Liberation Army (PLA) in December 1976, and joined the Chinese Communist Party (CCP) in August 1978. He graduated from the Second Artillery Force Academy in 1982 and later the PLA National Defence University with a bachelor's degree in 1994. After university, he taught there.

In April 2000, he was transferred to Xinjiang Military District and appointed deputy political commissar of the 6th Infantry Division. He was recalled to the PLA National Defence University in January 2002, where he successively served as associate professor, professor, deputy director, and director. In December 2013, he became deputy political commissar of the university, rising to political commissar in June 2017. He also served as secretary of its Commission for Discipline Inspection from August 2016 to July 2017.

Military offices
Preceded by Liu Yazhou	Political Commissar of the PLA National Defence University; 2017–2021	Succeeded by Zheng He
