= Li Shaozhu =

Chinese military officer (1911–1995)

- Native name: 李绍珠
- Born: December 1911; Xingguo County, Jiangxi, Qing China
- Died: 24 April 1995 (aged 83) Chengdu, Sichuan, China
- Allegiance: People's Republic of China
- Branch: People's Liberation Army Railway Force
- Service years: 1932–1970s
- Conflicts: Chinese Civil War; Second Sino-Japanese War; Korean War

Li Shaozhu (Chinese: 李绍珠; pinyin: Lǐ Shàozhū; December 1911 – 24 April 1995) was a Chinese military officer who served as a high-ranking officer in the People's Liberation Army Railway Force.

== Early life ==
Li Shaozhu was born in December 1911 in Yangyuan Village, Jiangbei Town in Xingguo County, Jiangxi, into a poor peasant family. His father died when he was six, and he was raised by an uncle. Due to poverty, he did not attend school and worked as a farm laborer. As a youth, he joined local revolutionary armed groups and supported Communist governance in the area.

== Military career ==
In February 1932, Li joined the 1st Army Corps of the First Red Army Front. He took part in operations in Fujian and Jiangxi, including the Shuikou, Le’an–Yihuang, Jian–Leiyang–Taining and Jinxi–Zixi battles. In 1933, he served as a squad leader in the 7th Division and later the 2nd Division, taking part in the counterattacks against the fourth and fifth encirclement campaigns against the Jiangxi Soviet by the Kuomintang. Li participated in the Long March, crossing major rivers including the Wu and Jinsha, fighting in the capture of Zunyi, the battles of Luding Bridge and Loushanguan in Guizhou. In December 1934, he joined the Chinese Communist Party. During the latter stages of the march, he became an artillery company commander and continued serving in the First Red Army Front.

In March 1936, Li became company commander in the 264th Regiment of the 30th Army, protecting the Central Committee and safeguarding the Red Army's rear in northern Shaanxi.

=== World War II and second-half of the Chinese Civil War ===
Following the outbreak of the Marco Polo Bridge incident in July 1937, Li served as an artillery officer in the 129th Division of the Eighth Route Army. In December, he was appointed battalion commander in the 3rd Regiment of the Garrison Corps, tasked with protecting the CCP Central Committee, Mao Zedong and the Shaan-Gan-Ning Border Region. From 1938 to 1945, he led troops in river defense operations on the Yellow River, border defense in central Shaanxi, confrontations with Kuomintang troops entering the border region and anti-Japanese actions in the Shaanxi–Gansu–Ningxia and Jin-Sui border areas.

From 1945 to 1949, Li served successively as deputy regimental commander and regimental commander in units of the Jin-Sui Field Army and the Northwest Field Army. He fought in the Linfen Campaign, the key battles around Taiyuan, and the advance into the northwest. In February 1949, he became commander of the 57th Regiment, 19th Division, 7th Army of the First Field Army. His regiment served as a main assault force during the final offensive of the Taiyuan Campaign, breaching the eastern gate and entering the city.

After the founding of the People's Republic of China in October 1949, he led operations in Sichuan such as capturing major cities, suppressing Kuomintang remnants and banditry.

=== PLA Railway Force ===
In 1952, the 19th Division was reorganized into the PLA Railway Engineering 5th Division and Li was appointed Chief of Staff. In 1953, during the Korean War, he entered North Korea with the division, responsible for rapid railway reconstruction and anti-airborne defenses in Taechon County, North Korea. His unit completed major railway restoration projects ahead of schedule. From 1954 to the late 1960s, Li oversaw construction or repair of several major national railway and military projects, including Yingtan–Xiamen Railway (Yingxia Line), Guiyang–Kunming Railway (Gui-Kun Line), Chengdu–Kunming Railway (Cheng-Kun Line) and Xichang Satellite Launch Center.

In 1965, he was promoted to Commander of the Railway Corps 5th Division within the PLA Railway Force. In 1969, he helped establish the Railway Corps Southwest Command and became its Deputy Commander.

Li was known for his lifelong commitment to simplicity. Because he routinely in his military life wore straw sandals, officers and soldiers under his command commonly called him the "straw-sandal commander".

== Personal and later life ==
Li was married to Gao Yinmei. The couple had two daughters and a son. His son, Li Shangfu, became a general in the People's Liberation Army Strategic Support Force, and served as the head of the Equipment Development Department of the Central Military Commission and later as China's Minister of National Defense from March to October 2023. In October 2023, Li Shangfu, along with former Defense Minister Wei Fenghe, were expelled from the Chinese Communist Party for "disciplinary and law violations", and was accused of accepting financial bribes as well as bribing others. Both men were also stripped of their rank of general.

Li died on 24 April 1995 in Chengdu, at the age of 83.

== Awards and decorations ==
His decorations include:

- August 1 Medal (Third class)
- Order of Independence and Freedom (Third class)
- Order of Liberation (Third class)
- Red Star Meritorious Medal (Second class)
