= Rao Kaixun =

Chinese politician

- 饶开勋

Chief of Staff of the People's Liberation Army Strategic Support Force
- In office August 2017 – March 2019
- Preceded by: Li Shangfu
- Succeeded by: Hao Weizhong

Head of Civil Defense Bureau of the Ministry of National Defense Mobilization of the Central Military Commission
- In office July 2013 – 2016
- Preceded by: Bai Jianjun
- Succeeded by: Position revoked

Army Commander of the 14th Group Army
- In office November 2012 – September 2013
- Preceded by: Zhou Xiaozhou
- Succeeded by: Wang Bing

Personal details
- Born: April 1964 (age 61–62) Yuexi County, Sichuan, China
- Party: Chinese Communist Party

Military service
- Allegiance: People's Republic of China
- Branch/service: People's Liberation Army Ground Force; People's Liberation Army Strategic Support Force
- Years of service: 1980–present
- Rank: Lieutenant general
- Commands: Deputy commander of the People's Liberation Army Strategic Support Force

Rao Kaixun (simplified Chinese: 饶开勋; traditional Chinese: 饒開勛; pinyin: Rao Kaixun; born April 1964) is a lieutenant general in the People's Liberation Army of China. In July 2019 he has been placed under investigation by the PLA's anti-corruption agency. Previously he served as deputy commander of the People's Liberation Army Strategic Support Force. He was promoted to the rank of major general (shao jiang) in 2010 and lieutenant general (zhong jiang) in 2017.

== Education ==
Rao was born in Yuexi County, Sichuan, in April 1964. He is of Hui ethnicity. He graduated from PLA National Defence University.

== Career ==
He enlisted in the People's Liberation Army in 1980. In 2010 he was promoted to become chief of staff of the 77th Group Army, after 30 years of grass-roots unit training. Two years later, he was appointed army commander of the 14th Group Army. In 2013, he was named head of the Operational Division of People's Liberation Army General Staff Department, replacing Bai Jianjun. That same year, he became head of Civil Defense Bureau of the Ministry of National Defense Mobilization of the Central Military Commission. In March 2016 he was appointed deputy commander of the People's Liberation Army Strategic Support Force. He concurrently served as its chief of staff in August 2017.

He was a delegate to the 12th and 13th National People's Congress.

== Investigation ==
In July 2019 he was placed under investigation by the PLA's anti-corruption agency. Rao was ordered to resign as representative of the 13th National People's Congress. He was downgraded to deputy corps leader grade position.

Military offices
Preceded by Zhou Xiaozhou (周小周)	Army Commander of the 14th Group Army; 2012–2013	Succeeded by Wang Bing (王兵)
Preceded by Bai Jianjun (白建军)	Head of Civil Defense Bureau of the Ministry of National Defense Mobilization of the Central Military Commission; 2013–2016	Succeeded by Position revoked
Preceded by Li Shangfu	Chief of Staff of the People's Liberation Army Strategic Support Force; 2017–2019	Succeeded by Vacant
