= Wang Peng (lieutenant general) =

Chinese general

- 王鹏

Head of the Training and Administration Department of the Central Military Commission
- In office December 2021 – September 2025
- Preceded by: Li Huohui

Personal details
- Born: February 1964 (age 62) Xiangxiang County, Hunan, China
- Party: Chinese Communist Party (expelled in 2026)
- Education: Nanjing University; PLA National Defence University

Military service
- Allegiance: People's Republic of China
- Branch/service: People's Liberation Army Ground Force
- Years of service: 1985–2025
- Rank: Lieutenant general
- Battles/wars: Sino-Vietnamese War

Chinese name
- Simplified Chinese: 王鹏
- Traditional Chinese: 王鵬
Transcriptions
Standard Mandarin
- Hanyu Pinyin: Wáng Péng

Wang Peng (Chinese: 王鹏; born February 1964) is a former lieutenant general in the People's Liberation Army of China, who served as head of the Training and Administration Department of the Central Military Commission.

He was a representative of the 20th National Congress of the Chinese Communist Party and a member of the 20th Central Committee of the Chinese Communist Party. In 2026, Wang was expelled from the Chinese Communist Party.

== Biography ==
Wang was born in Xiangxiang County (now Xiangxiang), Hunan, in February 1964.

After graduating from the Department of Economics, Nanjing University in 1985, he was assigned to researcher of the Strategic Theory Department of the PLA Academy of Military Sciences. He repeatedly asked for reassignment and came to Army Command College of the Chinese People's Liberation Army to receive a two-year professional training for synthetic staff officers. He joined the Chinese Communist Party (CCP) in November 1986. He participated in the Battle of Lao Mountain during the Sino-Vietnamese War. In March 2001, he graduated from the PLA National Defence University. In July 2006, he was appointed commander of the 34 Motor-Driven Infantry Brigade of the 12 Group Army (now 71st Group Army), and eventually becoming deputy chief of staff of the group army. In 2016, he was promoted to become deputy chief of staff of the Eastern Theater Command Ground Force, a position he held until June 2019, when he was made president of the Army Command College of the Chinese People's Liberation Army. He was vice president of the PLA National Defence University in June 2021, in addition to serving as chief education officer. In December 2021, he was chosen as head of the Training and Administration Department of the Central Military Commission, succeeding Li Huohui.

He was promoted to the rank of major general (shaojiang) in July 2017 and lieutenant general (zhongjiang) in December 2021.

Wang was a full member of the 20th Central Committee of the Chinese Communist Party.

== Downfall ==
On December 27, 2025, the Military Congress of the Training Management Department of the Central Military Commission decided to remove Wang Peng from his post as a deputy to the 14th National People's Congress. On 29 October 2026, the fifth plenary session of the 20th CCP Central Committee reviewed and approved the report of the Discipline Inspection Commission of the Central Military Commission on the "serious violations of discipline and law" by Wang and confirmed the Politburo decision to expel him from the CCP.

Military offices
Preceded by Li Huohui	Head of the Training and Administration Department of the Central Military Commission; 2021–2025	Succeeded by Liu Di
