= PLA Vocational Training Bureau =

Chinese military training agency

Vocational Education Bureau of the Training Administration Department of the Central Military Commission
- 中央军委训练管理部职业教育局

Agency overview
- Formed: 2016
- Type: Second-level functional department of the Central Military Commission
- Jurisdiction: People's Liberation Army
- Headquarters: Beijing
- Agency executives: PLAGF Lt Gen Shen Yuejin (沈跃进), Bureau chief; PLAAF Sr Col Li Qi (李麒), Deputy bureau chief
- Parent department: Training Administration Department

The Vocational Education Bureau of the Training Administration Department of the Central Military Commission, normally referred to as the PLA Vocational Education Bureau is a subordinate bureau under the Training Administration Department, of division grade, responsible for managing and coordinating vocational education (职业教育) in all the Armed Forces of China. It is based in Beijing.

== History ==
In January 2016, during the Military Reforms, Training Management Department of the CMC was established, and as one of its subordinate units, the Vocational Education Bureau. The Bureau was made responsible for the top-level design and overall management of military vocational education for the whole armed forces. Shen Yuejin was the first bureau head.

In August 2017, the Central Military Commission issued the "Implementation Plan for the Reform of Military Vocational Education", which officially launched the reform of military vocational education.

The main point of the plan was to reemphasize non-degree continuing education, and combine non-degree continuing education and academic continuing education into a lifelong education system for military personnel. As the main mechanism for this system, the plan envisaged the introduction of more online resources, training apps, and online courses, providing both resources and incentives for independent learning. Connected with this, the last measure is to establish an "educational banking system" that could test and track the progress of trainees. The plan was first implemented as a pilot project in 24 units in 2018.

== Functions ==
The need for better talent development has been emphasized often during Xi Jinping's military reform era. The main purpose of the VTB is to create a "ubiquitous learning environment where everyone can learn, learn everywhere, and learn at any time." This has been specifically executed by creating a military vocational education service platform (服务平台) in a triple system that spanned the Comprehensive Military Network (军事职业教育军综网), the internet, and mobile apps. As of 2021 the platform had 2,500 MOOCs, more than 13,000 micro-courses, and more than 248,000 test questions. At that time, the military (and PAP) comprehensive network had 2.7 million registered members, the general Internet service platform had reached 5.4 million, and the military mobile apps (including the WeChat applet) had reached nearly 110,000. Each officer and soldier is provided with a life-long account that provides access to courses, seminars, and examinations, as well as access to information and solution databases, including classified material. The internet platform also includes access to MOOCs from many Chinese universities, and online courses by XuetangX, amounting to around 20,000 courses on civilian and military subjects, running the gamut from military history to combat operations in complex electromagnetic environments.

The next issue was assessing and providing credentials for those courses. The first two full certifiable courses, in 2021, were "information technology and applications", and "information security and control". 36,000 people took the online course, of whom more than 4,200 signed up for the exam. Exams were run online with a pass rate of 87.6%. The course assessment was by the Ministry of Industry and Information Technology Education and Examination Center, which issued a special technical certificate, and were included the ministry's industrial and information and communication industry skilled talent database. As of 2022, 30,000 officers and soldiers had obtained the MIIT certificate, and a total of 160,000 officers and soldiers had obtained formal qualifications through the military vocational education system.

In 2022, rumors of special preference for elite university acceptance for military personnel in vocational education created a stir and had to be quashed directly by the VTB.

== Leadership ==
Bureau Head

- Shen Yuejin (沈跃进)(2016—)

Bureau Deputy Head

- Li Qi (李麒)(2016—)

== See also ==
- Vocational education
