= Training and Administration Department of the Central Military Commission =

Department of the Chinese Central Military Commission

- 中华人民共和国中央军事委员会训练管理部

Agency overview
- Formed: 11 January 2016
- Type: Functional department of the Central Military Commission
- Jurisdiction: People's Liberation Army
- Headquarters: Ministry of National Defense compound ("August 1st Building"), Beijing
- Agency executive: Liu Di, Director
- Parent agency: Central Military Commission
- Website: chinamil.com.cn

The Training and Administration Department of the Central Military Commission (Chinese: 中央军委训练管理部) is a first-level functional department under the Central Military Commission of the People's Republic of China, with a Theater Deputy grade, responsible for the management of all military training activities of the People's Liberation Army (PLA). It was founded on 11 January 2016, under Xi Jinping's military reforms, and it is based in Beijing.

== History ==
In April 1950, Xiao Ke was ordered to establish the Military Training Department of the Military Commission, which was done in September 1950. The first step of the new unit was to translate the Soviet Army's doctrines and regulations, and to collect military materials from various countries. This work resulted in the first draft of the three major doctrine documents of the People's Liberation Army, piloted in early 1951.

On 20 September 1950, the Military Training Department of the Central People's Government People's Revolutionary Military Commission established the Military Academic Administration Bureau. On 29 December 1952, the Military Academic Administration was expanded to become the Military School Management Department of the People's Revolutionary Military Commission. On 21 April 1955, the Military Academy Department was placed under the PLA Training Directorate. On 11 December 1958, the Training Directorate was abolished, and the affiliated military academies and school departments were placed under the jurisdiction of the General Staff Department, as the Military Academy Department.

=== Publishing ===
In January 1950, the Military Publishing Bureau of the Military Training Department of the People's Revolutionary Military Commission of the Central People's Government was established. In July 1952, it was placed under the General Staff Department of the People's Revolutionary Military Commission. On 21 April 1955, the Military Publishing Bureau of the Central Military Commission was changed to the Military Publishing Department of the Training Directorate of the Chinese People's Liberation Army. In April 1955, the Military Training Department was restructured into the Training Directorate Department of the Chinese People's Liberation Army. On 11 December 1958, the Training Directorate Department was abolished, and the Military Publishing Department was placed under the General Staff Department of the Chinese People's Liberation Army, and was renamed the Military Publishing Department of the General Staff Department. On 18 January 1963, the Military Publishing Department was changed into a bureau, called the Publishing Bureau of the General Staff Headquarters, and was affiliated to the Military Training Department of the General Staff Headquarters. In July 1965, the General Political Department reported to the Central Committee of the Chinese Communist Party and Central Military Commission for approval to establish the PLA's "Warrior Publishing House" based on the Publishing Bureau of the General Staff Headquarters. In December 1966, the Warrior Publishing House was merged with the Publishing Bureau of the General Staff Headquarters, the "A Spark sets the Plains Ablaze" editorial house of the General Political Department, and the editorial department of the People's Liberation Army Literature and Art Society. In December 1983, with the approval of the Central Military Commission, it was renamed Chinese People's Liberation Army Press. In September 1992, the China People's Liberation Army Publishing House and the People's Liberation Army Literature and Art Publishing House merged to form the People's Liberation Army Publishing House. In February 1994, the two publishing houses were restored. In October 2003, the two merged again to form the Chinese People's Liberation Army Publishing House.

=== Consolidation of training organizations ===
In 2011, with the approval of then Chairman of the Central Military Commission Hu Jintao, the Military Training and Services Department of the General Staff Department was restructured and established as the Military Training Department of the General Staff Headquarters of the PLA. The new unit had four new basic functions:"further strengthening the strategic management of military training, strengthening the macro management of joint training, strengthening the overall guidance of service and service training, and integrating joint army training." plus a new mission providing guidance on military unit construction. In November 2015, in the military reforms, the Military Training Department of the General Staff Department was abolished and reorganized and upgraded into the Training Administration Department of the Central Military Commission.

== Organization ==
Following the 2015 reforms, the TAD has the following internal organization:

=== Functional Departments ===
- General Office (办公厅)
- Political Work Bureau (政治工作局) -Deputy corps grade
- Training Bureau (训练局) -Deputy corps grade
- Academic Bureau (院校局) -Division grade
- Vocational Training Bureau (职业教育局) -Division grade
- Training Supervision Bureau (训练监察局) -Deputy corps grade
- Units Management Bureau (部队管理局)
- Military Education Bureau (军事教育局) -Deputy corps grade

=== Directly Subordinate Units ===
- CMC TAD Military Sports Training Center (中央军委训练管理部军事体育训练中心)

== Leadership ==
=== CMC TAD Director ===
1. PLAGF Lt Gen Zheng He (郑和) (2015-11—2017-1)
2. PLAGF Lt Gen Li Huohui (黎火辉) (2017-1—2021-12)
3. PLAGF Lt Gen Wang Peng (王鹏) (2021-12—2025-12)
4. PLAAF Lt Gen Liu Di (刘镝) (2025-9—present)

=== CMC TAD Political Commissar ===
1. PLAGF Maj Gen Zhang Shengmin (张升民) (2015-11月－2016-7)
2. PLAAF Lt Gen Ma Zhewen (马哲文)（2020-9—2023）

=== CMC TAD Deputy Directors ===
1. PLAGF Maj Gen Fang Beiqun (方北群) (2016年－)
2. PLAGF Maj Gen Yang Jian (杨剑) (2016年－)
3. Maj Gen Bi Yi (畢毅)

== See also ==
- Central Military Commission (China)
