= Xiao Tianliang =

Chinese general (born 1962)

- 肖天亮

President of the People's Liberation Army National Defense University
- Incumbent
- Assumed office February 2023
- Preceded by: Xu Xueqiang

Personal details
- Born: November 1962 (age 63) Zaoyang, Hubei, China
- Party: Chinese Communist Party
- Education: People's Liberation Army National Defense University

Military service
- Allegiance: People's Republic of China
- Branch/service: People's Liberation Army Navy
- Years of service: 1979–present
- Rank: General

Xiao Tianliang (Chinese: 肖天亮; pinyin: Xiāo Tiānliàng; born November 1962) is a general in the People's Liberation Army, currently serving as president of the People's Liberation Army National Defense University, in office since February 2023.

== Biography ==
Xiao was born in Zaoyang, Hubei, in November 1962. He enlisted in the People's Liberation Army (PLA) in 1979. He earned his doctor's degree from People's Liberation Army National Defense University in 2000. After graduation, he stayed for teaching. In 2007, he became deputy director of the Political Department of the South Sea Fleet. He was transferred back to the People's Liberation Army National Defense University and appointed deputy director of the Strategic Teaching and Research Department in 2011. In December 2014, he was named vice president of the university, rising to president in 2023.

He was promoted to the rank of major general (shaojiang) in July 2008, lieutenant general (zhongjiang) in August 2016, and general (shangjiang) in March 2024.

== Views ==
In a 2006 lecture to the PLA Academy of Military Science, Xiao stated that China would not consider using nuclear weapons in a dispute over Taiwan. According to Xiao, "If we are forced to enter war to prevent Taiwan independence in the future ... nuclear weapons cannot be used, and Taiwan's nuclear facilities cannot be attacked, otherwise how can we face international society and explain to our grandchildren"?

Military offices
Preceded by Xu Xueqiang	President of the People's Liberation Army National Defense University; 2023–present	Incumbent
