= Wang Yufa =

Chinese lieutenant general

- 王玉发
- Born: August 1948 (age 78); Nanzhao County, Henan, China
- Military career
- Allegiance: People's Republic of China
- Branch: People's Liberation Army Air Force
- Service years: 1968–2015
- Rank: Lieutenant general
- Units: 43rd Group Army; 54th Group Army; PLA Hong Kong Garrison
- Conflicts: Sino-Vietnamese War

Chinese name
- Traditional Chinese: 王玉發
- Simplified Chinese: 王玉发
Transcriptions
Standard Mandarin
- Hanyu Pinyin: Wāng Yùfā

Wang Yufa (Chinese: 王玉发; born August 1948) is a lieutenant general in the People's Liberation Army Air Force of China. He served as deputy political commissar of the Guangzhou Military Region and political commissar of its Air Force. On September 30, 2015, it was announced that he was being investigated for corruption and his case was handed over to military prosecutors.

He was a member of the 10th National People's Congress and a member of the 12th National Committee of the Chinese People's Political Consultative Conference.

== Biography ==
Born in August 1948 in Nanzhao County, Henan, Wang Yufa joined the People's Liberation Army in March 1968. He participated in the Sino-Vietnamese War. He was political commissar of 127 Division of 54th Group Army in 1985, and held that office until 1994. In November 1994 he became the deputy political commissar of the People's Liberation Army Hong Kong Garrison, rising to political commissar in May 1999. In December 2003, he was appointed the political commissar of Chengdu Military Region Air Force, he remained in that position until August 2006, when he was transferred to Guangzhou Military Region and appointed deputy political commissar of Guangzhou Military Region and political commissar of its Air Force. Wang attained the rank of major general in 1998 and lieutenant general in July 2005.

On August 28, 2015, Wang Yufa was removed from membership of China's top political advisory body, the Chinese People's Political Consultative Conference. On September 30, he was transferred to the military procuratorates.

Military offices
Preceded by Xiong Ziren	Political Commissar of the People's Liberation Army Hong Kong Garrison; 1999–2003	Succeeded by Liu Liangkai
Preceded by Liu Yazhou	Political Commissar of the Chengdu Military Region Air Force; 2003–2006	Succeeded by Jia Yanming
Preceded by Zhu Yongqing	Political Commissar of the Guangzhou Military Region Air Force; 2006–2012	Succeeded by Hu Xiutang
