= Alfred L. Chan =

Professor of political science

Alfred L. Chan is professor emeritus of political science at Huron University College.

== Books ==
- Xi Jinping: Political Career, Governance, and Leadership, 1953-2018 (Oxford University Press, 2022)
- Mao's Crusade: Politics and Policy Implementation in China's Great Leap Forward (Oxford University Press, 2001)
