= Gu Jun (born 1963) =

Chinese executive and politician (born 1963)

- 顾军

General Manager of the China National Nuclear Corporation
- In office 2018–2024

Personal details
- Born: June 1963 (age 63) Qidong, Jiangsu, China
- Party: Chinese Communist Party (1989-2026, expelled)
- Education: Shanghai Jiaotong University

Gu Jun (Chinese: 顾军; born June 1963) is a former Chinese executive and politician, who served as the general manager of the China National Nuclear Corporation (CNNC) from 2018 to 2024.

== Career ==
Gu was born in Qidong, Jiangsu in June 1963. He graduated from Shanghai Jiaotong University in 1983, where he majored in nuclear power and engineering. He joined the Chinese Communist Party (CCP) in April 1989.

Gu previously served as the general manager of Sanmen Nuclear Power Co., Ltd., and the general manager of the State Nuclear Power Technology Corporation. In 2015, he served as the deputy party secretary of the China Nuclear Engineering Corporation. He also served as the general manager and the president of the company.

In 2018, Gu was appointed as the general manager of the CNNC. He resigned in 2024.

== Investigation ==
On 19 January 2026, Gu was suspected of "serious violations of laws and regulations" by the Central Commission for Discipline Inspection (CCDI), the party's internal disciplinary body, and the National Supervisory Commission, the highest anti-corruption agency of China. Gu was expelled from the CCP on 25 July 2026.
