= Beijing Xiangshan Forum =

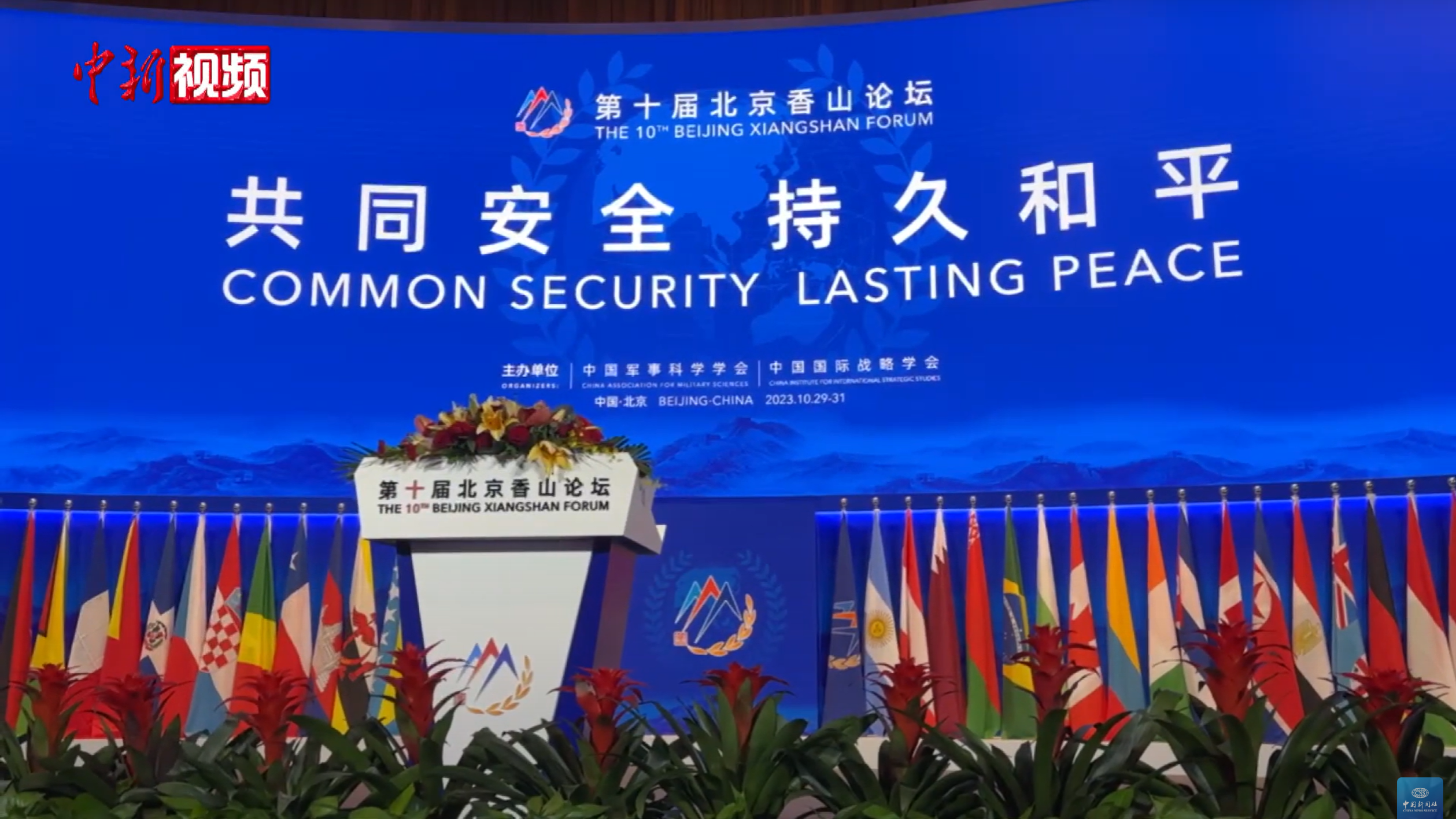
10th Beijing Xiangshan Forum, 30 October 2023

The Beijing Xiangshan Forum is a "Track One" inter-governmental security conference held annually in Beijing, China, hosted by the China Military Science Society.

== History ==
The 1st Beijing Xiangshan Forum was held in Beijing on 23 October 2006. It was called the International Forum of the Chinese Society for Military Science at that time, and was initially held every two years. Starting from the 5th Xiangshan Forum in 2014, the Xiangshan Forum was changed to be held every year. From 2015, the Xiangshan Forum was jointly organized by the Chinese Society for Military Science and the Chinese Institute for International Strategic Studies. From 2018, the Xiangshan Forum was renamed the Beijing Xiangshan Forum.

== Format ==
The Beijing Xiangshan Forum has been described as China's most important annual defense conference. Reuters describes it as a "tightly scripted Chinese rival" to the Shangri-La Dialogue held in Singapore. Regional countries tend to send ministerial-level officials to the forum, while Western countries generally send relatively low-level delegations.
