= Shangri-La Hotel, Singapore =

Hotel skyscraper in Singapore

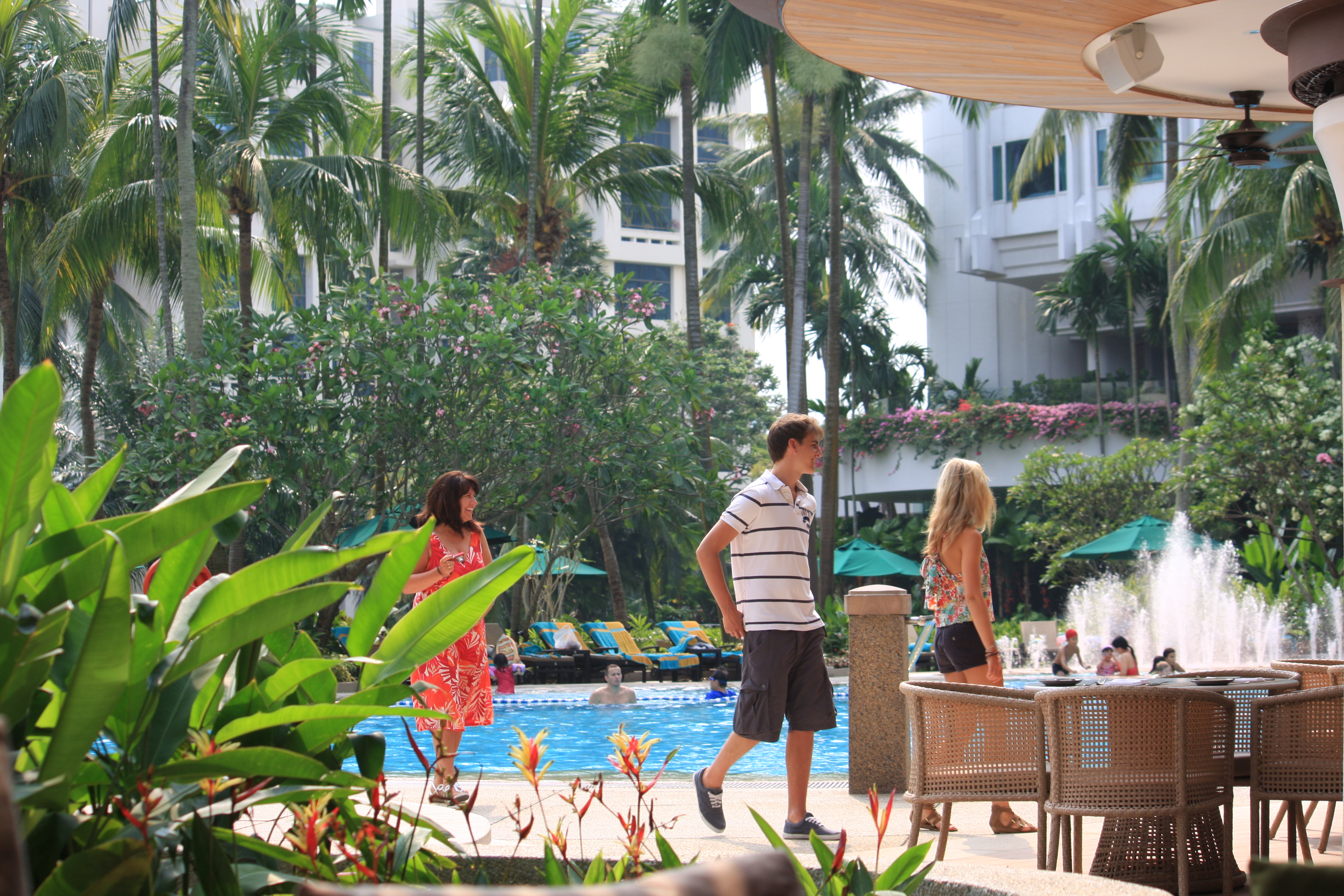
- Breakfast time by the poolside
- Interactive map of the Shangri-La Hotel, Singapore area

General information
- Architectural style: High-rise
- Location: 22 Orange Grove Road, Singapore 258350
- Coordinates: 1°18′41″N 103°49′36″E
- Construction started: 1965; 61 years ago
- Completed: 1971; 55 years ago (Tower Wing); 1978; 48 years ago (Garden Wing); 1985; 41 years ago (Valley Wing)
- Renovated: 2011-2012 (Garden Wing)
- Owner: Shangri-La Hotels and Resorts
- Operator: Shangri-La Hotels and Resorts

Technical details
- Floor count: 38, with 3 basement levels
- Lifts/elevators: 80

Design and construction
- Developer: Shangri-La Hotels and Resorts
- Main contractor: Shangri-La Hotels and Resorts

Other information
- Number of rooms: 792 (hotel) 127 (serviced apartments) 55 (condominium)
- Number of restaurants: 6

Website
- Shangri-La Hotel, Singapore

Shangri-La Hotel, Singapore is a five-star deluxe hotel located on Orange Grove Road, off Orchard Road, in Singapore.

Opened on 23 April 1971, the hotel is Shangri-La Hotels and Resorts' first hotel property. The hotel has 792 guestrooms and suites, as well as 127 serviced apartments, which require a minimum stay of six nights to be booked, along with 55 condominium units which necessitate longer stays of at least three months.

The hotel hosts the annual meeting of the Shangri-La Dialogue, described by the International Institute of Strategic Studies as "Asia's premier defence summit". In 2015, the hotel was the venue for a historic meeting between the People's Republic of China's paramount leader Xi Jinping and the Republic of China's President Ma Ying-jeou; this was the first meeting between the leaders of mainland China and Taiwan since the 1949 Chinese Communist Revolution.

== Tower Wing ==
The Tower Wing, which opened in 1971, is the hotel's main wing; it houses the deluxe rooms, executive rooms, Horizon Club rooms, and Horizon Premier Suite. Additionally, the majority of the dining outlets in the hotel are located in the Tower Wing.

== Garden Wing ==
The Garden Wing, located within the hotel's 15 acres of landscaped gardens, opened in 1978. It houses 158 guestrooms and suites, all of which are fitted with balconies.

In 2011, the Garden Wing closed for renovation and reopened on 31 May 2012 after eight months of renovation which cost S$68 million.

== Valley Wing ==
The Valley Wing was the last of the hotel's three wings to be completed, opening in 1985. Shangri-La Singapore describes it as "the accommodation of choice" for heads of states, business executives, and luxury travellers.

== The Shangri-La Dialogue ==
The IISS Asia Security Summit, also simply known as the "Shangri-La Dialogue", is an annual inter-governmental summit held by the International Institute for Strategic Studies. It is attended by defence officials from primarily Asia–Pacific states, including the members of ASEAN, the United States or China. The summit has been held at the Shangri-La Hotel since 2002.

== Trump-Kim Summit special event area ==
On 3 June 2018, in preparation for the Trump–Kim summit, a "special event area" was declared around the hotel and Capella Singapore. Extra security measures were in force from 10 to 14 June 2018.
