= Shangri-La Dialogue =

Inter-governmental security conference

Shangri-La Dialogue

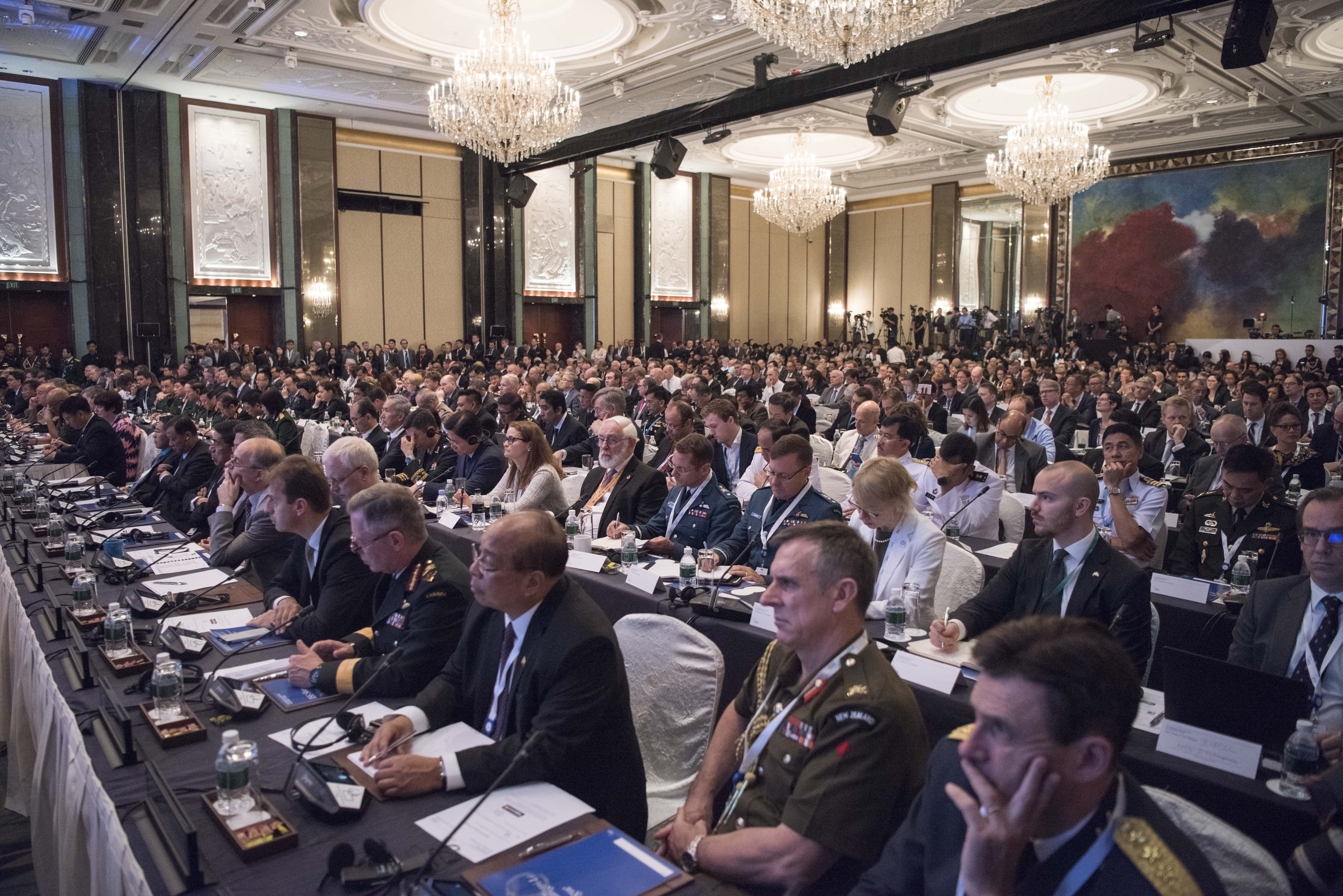
Delegates at the dialogue

The IISS Asia Security Summit: The Shangri-La Dialogue (SLD) is a "Track One" inter-governmental security conference held annually in Singapore by the International Institute for Strategic Studies (IISS). The dialogue is commonly attended by defence ministers, permanent heads of ministries and military chiefs of mostly Asia-Pacific states. The forum's name is derived from the Shangri-La Hotel in Singapore, where it has been held since 2002.

The summit serves to cultivate a sense of community among the most important policymakers in the defence and security community in the region. Government delegations often use the dialogue as an opportunity to hold bilateral meetings with other delegations on the sidelines. While primarily an inter-governmental meeting, the summit is also attended by legislators, academic experts, distinguished journalists and business delegates.

Over the years, the Shangri-La Dialogue has become one of the most important independent forums for the exchange of views by international security policy decision-makers. Besides the host nation, countries that have participated in the dialogue have included Australia, Brunei, Cambodia, Canada, Chile, China, France, Germany, India, Indonesia, Japan, South Korea, Laos, Malaysia, Mongolia, Myanmar, New Zealand, Pakistan, Philippines, Russia, Sri Lanka, Sweden, Switzerland, Thailand, Timor-Leste, Ukraine, United Kingdom, United States and Vietnam.

== History ==
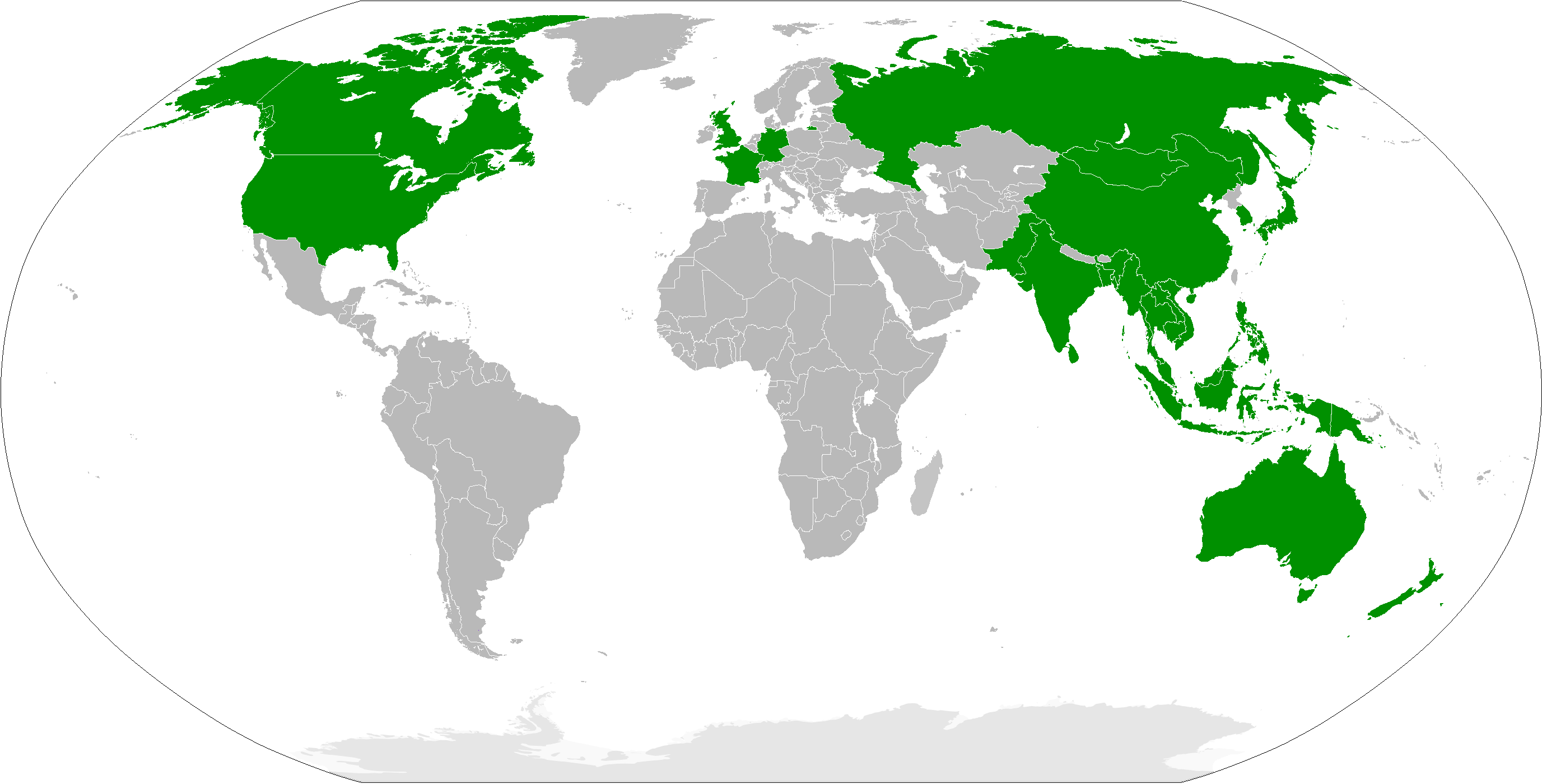
Countries participating in Shangri-La Dialogue

=== Background ===
Prior to the first summit, Asia lacked a regional security framework like Europe. Earlier in 1996, US Defence Secretary William Perry and Thai Defence Minister Chavalit Yongchaiyudh each proposed separate initiatives to gather their counterparts in Asia but these came to nothing. The only Track One multilateral Asian security forum was the ASEAN Regional Forum (ARF), which was found to be unwieldy since it focused on confidence-building and at worst, little more than a talkshop. In addition, the ARF was led by foreign ministers, leaving defence diplomacy and security cooperation in the region somewhat in want for a mechanism for defence ministers to interact.

The SLD was conceived by the current IISS Director-General and Chief Executive Sir John Chipman in 2001 in response to the clear need for a forum where the Asia Pacific defence ministers could engage in dialogue aimed at building confidence and fostering practical security cooperation. During the 36th Munich Conference on Security Policy, Chipman 'noticed Asian officials receiving short shrift' and realised that 'Asia needed its own defence institution at which defence ministers met and spoke'.

Initially the SLD was modelled after the Munich Conference on Security Policy, but with greater ambition - to create a Track One organization that "defence ministers needed if they were to have any chance at all of meeting multilaterally in a transregional format". Invitations were essentially focused on the members of the ASEAN Regional Forum in order to serve as a true regional security institution. Singapore was chosen as the location for the initial conference and with the Shangri-La Hotel as the venue. Chipman approached Singapore President SR Nathan in February 2001 to propose the idea, and Nathan offered to provide IDSS support until the IISS could run the conference independently. The idea was brought forward to the Cabinet of Singapore and was approved to be supported by the Ministry of Defence.

In 2004, the IISS Asia office was opened to allow IISS to organize the summit independently.

=== 2000s ===
Timothy J. Keating and Jerry Mateparae discussing mutual defense issues at the Shangri-La Dialogue in 2009

Initiated in 2002, it was an "unofficial defence summit'" which allowed defence officials to meet "privately and in confidence, bilaterally and multilaterally, without the obligation to produce a formal statement or communique". About a dozen deputy ministers and ministerial representatives attended the inaugural summit (then known as the Asia Security Conference), including a US delegation led by US Deputy Defence Secretary Paul Wolfowitz. The first summit was organized in six plenary sessions lasting for one and a half days.

In 2003, the second summit expanded its invitation list to include chiefs of defence staff, and permanent or under secretaries of defence ministries. The agenda this year was organized around five plenary sessions supplemented by two simultaneous off-the-record 'break-out groups'.

In 2004, the invitation list was again further expanded to include participating countries' most senior intelligence and the police and national security officials of some countries. The number of break-out groups was increased to three.

In 2005, Pakistan was represented for the first time.

In 2006, the number of delegations had risen to 23 countries, with 17 being led by their respective defence ministers, and another 3 by deputy defence ministers or equivalent.

The 2007 iteration of the SLD was a landmark meeting as it attracted top-level participation from China. The Deputy Chief of the General Staff of the People's Liberation Army (with the status of Vice-Minister) Lieutenant-General Zhang Qinsheng, led Beijing's delegation that year. Subsequently, in 2008, Vietnam and Myanmar elevated their representation to deputy minister level. Then in 2009, Vietnam was represented at full ministerial status with General Phung Quang Thanh leading its delegation.

In 2008, Laos was represented for the first time. Notably despite the natural disasters in their respective countries, Myanmar and China were led by high-level officers, Deputy Minister of Defence, Major-General Aye Myint for Myanmar and Deputy Chief of the General Staff, Lieutenant-General Ma Xiaotian for China. The number of plenary sessions increased from five to six, while the number of break-out groups increased from three to six.

In 2009, Australian Prime Minister Kevin Rudd was the first head of government other than Singapore to address the summit's opening dinner. It is also known that Singapore and Australia signed a memorandum of agreement on the sidelines of the 2009 summit allowing Singapore's armed forces access to Australian training facilities for a further decade.

=== 2010s ===
In the 2010 summit, President of the Republic of Korea, Lee Myung-Bak, was the first head of state to make the keynote speech at the summit. Other notable delegations include the Russian delegation, led by Deputy Prime Minister (and former defence minister) Sergei Ivanov, and the Chilean delegation, led by Minister of Defence Jaime Ravinet de la Fuente. Despite Japanese Prime Minister Yukio Hatoyama's resignation the day before the SLD, his successor, Prime Minister Naoto Kan, ensured that Minister of Defense Toshimi Kitazawa could attend and speak in a plenary session at the SLD. US Defence Secretary Robert Gates made his fourth SLD appearance and China's Lieutenant-General Ma Xiaotian, Deputy Chief of the General Staff led a strong delegation from China's People's Liberation Army.

In June 2011, there was a marked shift in the debate towards non-traditional security issues as well as on the South China Sea. Malaysian Prime Minister Najib in his keynote address mentioned new multilaterism to deal with security challenges to the region includes people smuggling, drug trafficking, terrorism and nuclear proliferation. China was represented at the summit for the first time at full ministerial level. Chinese Defence Minister General Liang Guanglie indicated China's peaceful rise in the region and willingness to work with neighbouring countries to resolve competing claims to disputed territorial claims in the South China Sea.

The United States reiterated its commitment to the Asia Pacific region despite having budgetary constraints, wars and a waning domestic economy. Outgoing US defence secretary Robert Gates said he will bet anyone $100 that in the next five years US influence will be strong if not stronger than today. The United States has always been seen as the preeminent power in the Pacific Rim and now has to accommodate an emerging China to help maintain stability and security in the region.

In 2017, the 16th SLD was held from 2–4 June 2017.

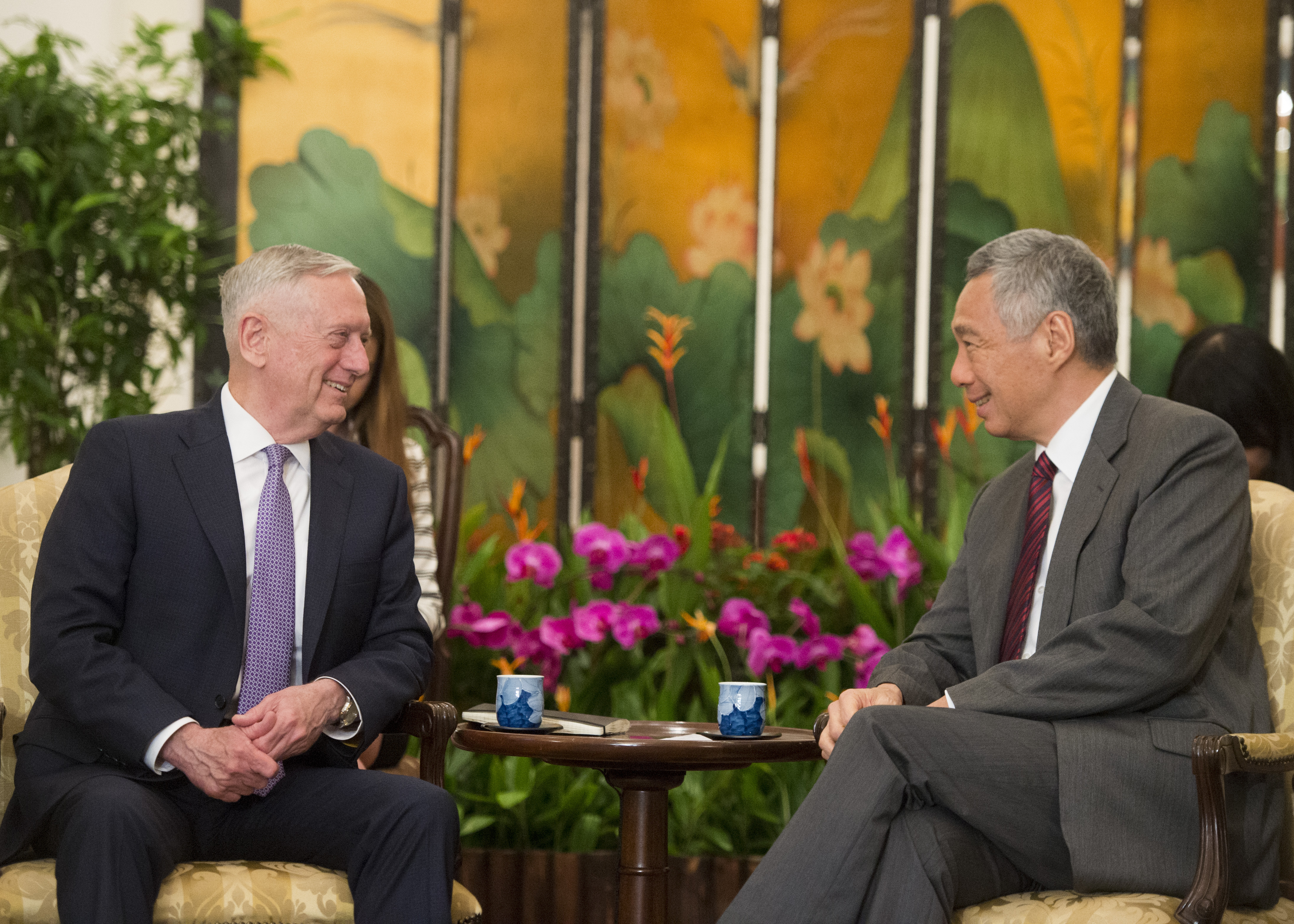
Jim Mattis and Lee Hsien Loong discussing military relations between their two countries at the Shangri-La Dialogue in 2017

In 2018, the 17th SLD was held from 1–3 June 2018.

The 18th SLD was held in June 2018 and has the most participants to date from nearly 50 countries and territories. The dialogue was opened by Singapore Prime Minister, Lee Hsien Loong. Six plenary sessions were held and other special sessions on maritime security, defence, industrial development and defence co-operation.

=== 2020s ===
The 19th SLD, which was originally scheduled for 5–7 June 2020, was postponed to 2021 due to the COVID-19 pandemic in Singapore. It was further postponed to 2022 as the pandemic was still ongoing in Singapore.

The 19th SLD was held on 10–12 June 2022 after a two-year hiatus. Japan's Prime Minister, Fumio Kishida, was a keynote speaker, while State Councillor and Minister of National Defense for China, General Wei Fenghe, addressed and was questioned by an audience over China's vision for regional order. Representatives from 42 countries which included 37 ministerial-level delegates and more than 30 senior defence officials attended the summit. Ukraine President Volodymyr Zelenskyy made a virtual address to the Summit on 11 June.

The 21st SLD was held in Singapore from 31 May–2 June 2024. The 23rd SLD was held in Singapore in May 2026 and was noted for lacking high-level participants from China for the second year in a row.

== Format ==
=== Plenary sessions ===
Each summit typically is opened by a keynote address, historically given by a prominent Singaporean figure. Beginning in 2009, a head of state or head of government has delivered the keynote address. Australian Prime Minister Kevin Rudd in 2009, the President of the Republic of Korea Lee Myung-Bak in 2010, and Malaysian Prime Minister Dato' Sri Najib Tun Razak in 2011 respectively delivered the opening speech. Five plenary sessions are held across the remaining two days of the summit where all participants are expected to be present. These on-record sessions are usually led by a minister only and the press are invited to report on them. By 2006, plenary speaking slots are allocated only to ministers from a delegation.

=== Break-out groups ===
Introduced by the second summit in 2003, break-out groups are held concurrently with each other and allow more open discussion between participants on specific issues. These sessions also ensure that sufficient time is available during the summit for ministers to hold bilateral meetings. The break-out groups are strictly off-the-record so that officials could advance policy goals more freely. The break-out groups are usually chaired by a senior IISS staff member. By 2006, break-out group speaking slots are allocated only to ministers or senior officials from a delegation.

=== Bilateral meetings ===
While largely unpublicised, the Shangri-La Dialogues provide an annual venue for ministers, CHODs, and top defence officials to network and expand their defence diplomacy in private, bilaterally and multilaterally. Rooms are reserved for the meetings to take place during breaks. A government delegation might typically arrange 15-20 such encounters, lasting half an hour each, over the course of the summit. Singapore's defence minister usually also hosts multilateral private lunches.

=== Non-Government delegates ===
The summit has been consistently attended by a mix of 200-plus non-government delegates, which include politicians, academics, businessmen, think tank analysts, media and other NGO personnel. This has given the SLD an aspect of a Track Two process, even though it is primarily a Track One event. Taylor notes that there are limited opportunities for interaction between non-government and government representatives. The inclusion of non-government delegates is the result of dynamic efforts being made so that the SLD does not become an "exclusive club".

== Impact ==
Shangri-La has contributed to the enhancement of defence diplomacy by participating countries, in part by inspiring similar forums in other regions (e.g. the Halifax International Security Forum).

The 2010 Chinese Defence White paper explicitly mentioned senior Chinese participation in Shangri-La Dialogue since 2007 as one of their forums of participation in regional security cooperation. The IISS thinks that increased representation from China indicate an increased level of engagement on a multilateral level and that the PLA wished to improve its image after recent measures, which were seen as too aggressive, impacted relations with affected countries.

== See also ==
- Defence Diplomacy
- Munich Security Conference
- ASEAN Regional Forum
- Council for Security Cooperation in the Asia Pacific
- Beijing Xiangshan Forum
- Shangri-La Shooting, 2015
- Raisina Dialogue
