= Equipment Development Department of the Central Military Commission =

Department of the Chinese Central Military Commission

- 中央军委装备发展部

Agency overview
- Formed: 11 January 2016; 10 years ago
- Type: Functional department of the Central Military Commission
- Jurisdiction: People's Liberation Army
- Headquarters: Ministry of National Defense compound ("August 1st Building"), Beijing
- Agency executive: Xu Xueqiang, Director
- Parent agency: Central Military Commission
- Child agency: China Manned Space Agency
- Website: www.weain.mil.cn

The Equipment Development Department of the Central Military Commission (Chinese: 中央军委装备发展部) is a first-level unit of deputy theater grade under the Central Military Commission of the People's Republic of China. It was founded on January 11, 2016, under Xi Jinping's military reforms. The department mission is to coordinate, oversee, and foster the development and acquisition of military equipment. General Zhang Youxia served as the first director. The current director is Xu Xueqiang. It also registers the patents related to military technology. The China Manned Space Agency is also hosted there and the department plays a critical role in the Chinese space program.

== Procurement ==
The Equipment Development Department has responsibility for the procurement of a very wide range of military equipment: from 10 mm Beanbag rounds for riot control to mobile laser communication systems, up to Su-35 fighter aircraft and S-400 Anti-aircraft missiles.

The latter systems were acquired from Russia in the late 2010s, after which the United States Department of State imposed sanctions on the Equipment Development Department and its head Li Shangfu (then a lieutenant general) in September 2018 under the Countering America's Adversaries Through Sanctions Act.

The establishment of the Department for Weapons Development as part of the 2015 reforms did bring a significant change in the procurement process. Tenders became then open to the public through a website operated by the department, the "All-PLA Arms and Equipment Purchase Information Network" (全军武器装备采购信息). Formally, not only state-owned companies, but also private companies can submit bids. This opening to market competition has the dual goal of improving quality and reducing prices on the one hand, and on the other, to further the goal of "military-civilian integration" (军民融合). This entails that as much dual-use technology as possible should be developed, such as carbon fiber materials, information security in cloud computing, hybrid drives and renewable energies.

In order to facilitate this integration, efforts are being made to unify the standards for software and information sharing in the military and civilian sectors. A reduction of the extreme opaqueness of the old procurement process was also started. As a first practical step, the National Defense Intellectual Property Bureau lifted the secrecy of 2,346 patents relevant to defense technology in March 2017 and published them on the procurement portal of the Weapons Development Department. In April 2018, the office published 4,038 additional patents covering the areas of material science and engineering, measurement technology, radar reconnaissance, satellite navigation and communication technology.

== Organization ==
As of 2018, the EDD has the following structure:

=== Bureaus ===
- General Office (办公厅)
- Political Work Bureau (政治工作局)
- Comprehensive Planning Bureau (综合计划局)
- Contract Supervision Bureau (合同监管局)http://www.staroceans.org/weain/download.65
- Research Commissioning Bureau (科研订购局)
- Information Systems Bureau (信息系统局)
- Experiments Evaluation Bureau (试验鉴定局)
- National Defense Intellectual Property Bureau (国防知识产权局)
- Equipment Technology Cooperation Bureau (装备技术合作局)
- Military Representatives Bureau (军事代表局)
- China Manned Space Agency (Office)

=== Directly subordinate unit ===
- National Defense Patents Examination Center (国防专利审查中心)

== Directors ==
- Zhang Youxia (January 2016 - August 2017)
- Li Shangfu (September 2017 - October 2022)
- Xu Xueqiang (October 2022 - Incumbent)

== See also ==
- Central Military Commission (China)
- People's Liberation Army General Armaments Department (abolished)
