= People's Liberation Army National Defense University =

Public collegiate military university headquartered in Beijing, China

PLA National Defense University
- 中国人民解放军国防大学
- Former name: Counter-Japanese Military and Political University
- Motto: 团结、紧张、严肃、活泼
- Motto in English: Togetherness, Alertness, Seriousness, Liveliness
- Type: Public military university
- Established: 1927; 99 years ago (predecessor); 1985; 41 years ago (current entity)
- Founder: Deng Xiaoping
- Affiliations: People's Liberation Army
- President: Xiao Tianliang
- Vice-president: Xia Zhihe (political commissar)
- Location: Beijing, China
- Website: www.cdsndu.org

Chinese name
- Simplified Chinese: 中国人民解放军国防大学
- Traditional Chinese: 中國人民解放軍國防大學
Transcriptions
Standard Mandarin
- Hanyu Pinyin: Zhōngguó Rénmín Jiěfàngjūn Guófáng Dàxué

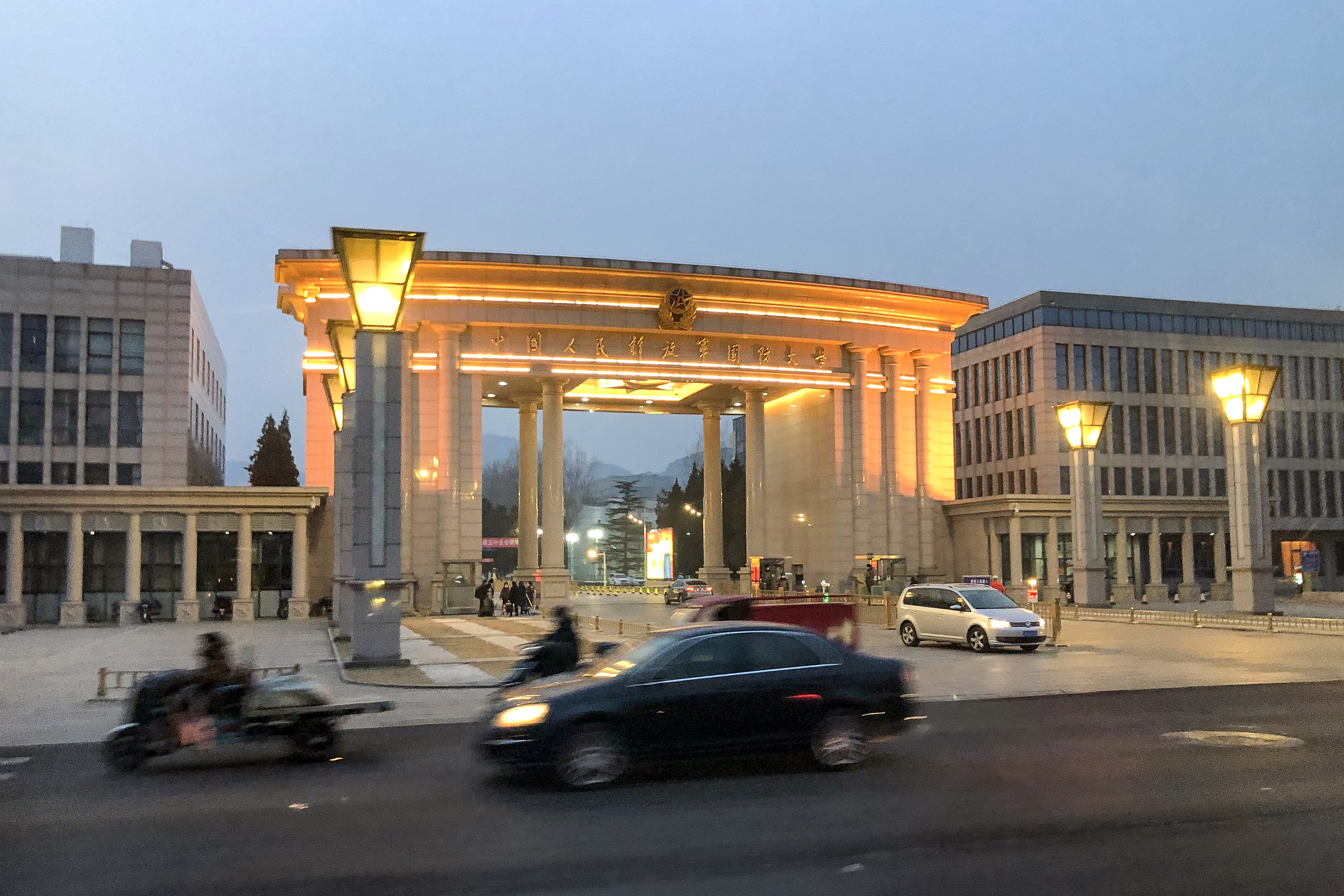
Main Gate of PLA National Defense University

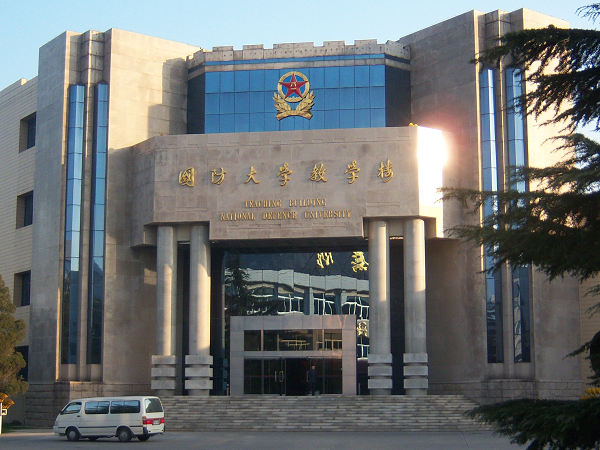
Teaching Building of PLA National Defense University

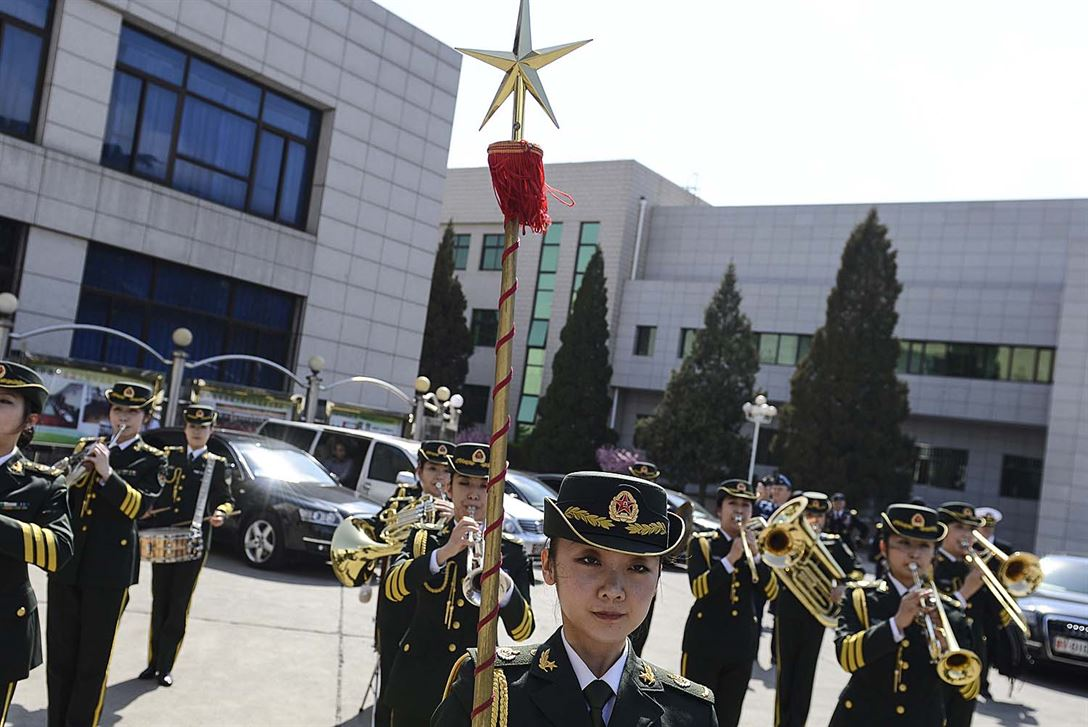
The Women's Military Band of the PLA National Defense University during the arrival of General Martin E. Dempsey at the NDU, April 2013.

The PLA National Defense University (Chinese: 中国人民解放军国防大学; pinyin: Zhōngguó Rénmín Jiěfàngjūn Guófáng Dàxué) is a national military university headquartered in Haidian, Beijing, China, with constituent and affiliated military academies nationwide. Established in 1985 by a military order of Deng Xiaoping, the university is under the "institutional leadership" of the Central Military Commission. The university is the highest military education institution of China.

The current president of the university is People's Liberation Army (PLA) general Xiao Tianliang. Its current political commissar is vice admiral Xia Zhihe.

== History ==
The National Defense University originated from the Chinese Red Army teaching team founded by Mao Zedong in Jinggang Mountains in 1927.

In December 1985, by a military order signed by Deng Xiaoping, then chairman of the Central Military Commission, the National Defense University was established by merging the People's Liberation Army's Military Academy, the Political Academy, and the Logistics Academy.

In 2017, a textbook published by the PLA National Defense University called the Science of Military Strategy debuted the potential for biological warfare to include "specific ethnic genetic attacks."

In July 2017, under the chairmanship of Xi Jinping, according to the order of the Central Military Commission, the former National Defense University, the Nanjing Institute of Political Science, the Xi'an Institute of Political Science, the PLA Academy of Art, the PLA Logistics Academy, the Shijiazhuang Ground Force Command Academy, the Armed Police Academy of Political Science, and some departments of the Equipment Academy merged to form the new National Defense University.

== Events ==
The university hosted visitors from Singapore and Australia as well as partnered with foreign firms such as Synopsys for technology transfer arrangements.

In 2015, the People's Liberation Army National Defense University formed a think tank called the China National Security Studies Centre.

== Planning ==
Planners at National Defense University project China's space military actions in space as retaliatory or preventative, following conditions like an attack on a Chinese satellite, an attack on China, or the interruption of a PLA amphibious landing. According to this approach, PLA planners assume that the country must have the capacity for retaliation and second-strike capability against a powerful opponent. PLA planners envision a limited space war and therefore seek to identify weak but critical nodes in other space systems.

== See also ==
- List of government-run higher-level national military academies
- Academic institutions of the armed forces of China
- PLA Nanjing Political College
