= People's Liberation Army =

Combined military forces of the People's Republic of China

- 中国人民解放军
- Emblem of the People's Liberation Army

- Flag of the People's Liberation Army; The characters are "八一", referencing August 1.
- Motto: 为人民服务 ("Serve the People")
- Founded: 1 August 1927; 99 years ago Nanchang uprising
- Current form: 10 October 1947; 79 years ago
- Service branches: Services: Ground Force; Navy; Air Force; Rocket Force; Arms: Aerospace Force; Cyberspace Force; Information Support Force; Joint Logistics Support Force
- Headquarters: August First Building, Fuxing Road, Haidian, Beijing
- Website: eng.chinamil.com.cn

Leadership
- Governing body: Central Military Commission
- CMC leadership: Chairman: Xi Jinping; Vice Chairman: General Zhang Shengmin
- Minister of National Defense: Admiral Dong Jun
- Director of the Political Work Department: Lieutenant General Chen Demin (Acting)
- Chief of the Joint Staff Department: Vacant
- Secretary of Discipline Inspection Commission: General Zhang Shuguang

Personnel
- Military age: 18
- Conscription: Inactive since 1949 (Law dictates a hybrid system of conscripts and volunteers)
- Active personnel: 2,035,000 (2025) (ranked 1st)
- Reserve personnel: 510,000 (2025)

Expenditure
- Budget: US$336 billion (2025) (ranked 2nd)
- Percent of GDP: 1.7% (2024)

Industry
- Domestic suppliers: China National Aero-Technology Import & Export Corporation; China Electronics Technology Group; Norinco; China Precision Machinery Import-Export Corporation; Aviation Industry Corporation of China; China State Shipbuilding Corporation; China Shipbuilding Industry Corporation; China Aerospace Science and Technology Corporation; China Aerospace Science and Industry Corporation; China South Industries Group Corporation; China Electronics Technology Group; China National Nuclear Corporation
- Foreign suppliers: Russia; Historical: Soviet Union
- Annual imports: $14.858 billion (2010–2021)
- Annual exports: $18.121 billion (2010–2021)

Related articles
- History: History of the PLA; Modernization of the PLA; Historical Chinese wars and battles; Military engagements
- Ranks: Army ranks; Navy ranks; Air force ranks

Chinese People's Liberation Army
- Simplified Chinese: 中国人民解放军
- Traditional Chinese: 中國人民解放軍
- Literal meaning: "China People Liberation Army"
Transcriptions
Standard Mandarin
- Hanyu Pinyin: Zhōngguó Rénmín Jiěfàngjūn
- Bopomofo: ㄓㄨㄥ ㄍㄨㄛˊ ㄖㄣˊ ㄇㄧㄣˊ ㄐㄧㄝˇ ㄈㄤˋ ㄐㄩㄣ
- Wade–Giles: Chung^{1}-kuo^{2} Jen^{2}-min^{2} Chieh^{3}-fang^{4}-chün^{1}
- Tongyong Pinyin: Jhong-guó Rén-mín Jiě-fàng-jyun
- IPA: [ʈʂʊ́ŋ.kwǒ ɻə̌n.mǐn tɕjè.fǎŋ.tɕýn]
Yue: Cantonese
- Yale Romanization: Jūng-gwok Yàhn-màhn Gáai-fong-gwān
- Jyutping: zung1 gwok3 jan4 man4 gaai2 fong3 gwan1
- IPA: [tsʊŋ˥ kʷɔk̚˧ jɐn˩ mɐn˩ kaj˧˥ fɔŋ˧ kʷɐn˥]

The People's Liberation Army (PLA) is the military wing of the Chinese Communist Party (CCP) and the primary armed forces of the People's Republic of China (PRC). It consists of four services—Ground Force, Navy, Air Force, and Rocket Force—and four arms—Aerospace Force, Cyberspace Force, Information Support Force, and Joint Logistics Support Force. It operates under the CCP's absolute control and is led by the Central Military Commission (CMC) with its chairman as commander-in-chief. Alongside the paramilitary People's Armed Police (PAP) and the Militia, the PLA forms the bulk of the country's armed forces.

The PLA can trace its origins during the Republican era to the left-wing units of the National Revolutionary Army (NRA) of the Kuomintang (KMT), when they broke away in 1927 in an uprising against the nationalist government as the Chinese Red Army before being reintegrated into the NRA as units of New Fourth Army and Eighth Route Army during the Second Sino-Japanese War. The two NRA communist units were reconstituted as the PLA in 1947. Since 1949, the PLA has used nine different military strategies, which it calls "strategic guidelines". The most important came in 1956, 1980, and 1993. Politically, the PLA and the PAP have the largest delegation in the National People's Congress (NPC); the joint delegation currently has 281 deputies—over 9% of the total—all of whom are CCP members.

The PLA is the armed wing of the CCP and controlled by the party, not by the state. The PLA's primary mission is the defense of the party and its interests. The PLA is the guarantor of the party's survival and rule, and the party prioritizes maintaining control and the loyalty of the PLA. According to Chinese law, the party has absolute control over the armed forces and the CMC exercises supreme military command; the party and state CMCs are practically a single body by membership. Since 1989, the CCP general secretary has also been the CMC Chairman; this grants significant political power as the only member of the Politburo Standing Committee with direct responsibilities for the armed forces. The Ministry of National Defense has no command authority; it is the PLA's interface with state and foreign entities and insulates the PLA from external influence.

Today, the majority of military units around the country are assigned to one of five theatre commands by geographical location. In addition to wartime arrangements, the PLA is also involved in the peacetime operations of other components of the armed forces. This is particularly visible in maritime territorial disputes where the navy is heavily involved in the planning, coordination and execution of operations by the PAP's China Coast Guard. The PLA is the world's largest military force (not including paramilitary or reserve forces) and has the second largest defence budget in the world. China's military expenditure was US$336 billion in 2024, accounting for 12 percent of the world's defence expenditures. It is also one of the fastest modernizing militaries in the world, and has been termed as a potential military superpower, with significant regional defence and rising global power projection capabilities.

== Mission ==
The PLA's primary mission is the defense of the CCP and its interests. It is the guarantor of the party's survival and rule, and the party prioritizes maintaining control and the loyalty of the PLA.

In 2004, paramount leader Hu Jintao stated the mission of the PLA as:

- Consolidate the rule of the CCP
- Ensure sovereignty, territorial integrity, internal security and national development of the People's Republic of China
- Safeguard the country's interests
- Help maintain world peace

China describes its military posture as active defense, defined in a 2015 state white paper as "We will not attack unless we are attacked, but we will surely counterattack if attacked."

== History ==
=== Early history ===
In 1925, the CCP's Central Military Department, was renamed the Central Military Commission. It was first led by Zhang Guotao who was replaced by Zhou Enlai in 1926 as head of the CMC. At the time of the First United Front, the CMC was not a unified military command structure but was more of an administrative liaison with other armed communist groups.

The CCP founded its military wing on 1 August 1927 during the Nanchang uprising, beginning the Chinese Civil War. Communist elements of the National Revolutionary Army rebelled under the leadership of Zhu De, He Long, Ye Jianying, Zhou Enlai, and other leftist elements of the Kuomintang (KMT) after the Shanghai massacre in 1927. They were then known as the Chinese Workers' and Peasants' Red Army, or simply the Red Army. In 1934 and 1935, the Red Army survived several campaigns led against it by Chiang Kai-Shek's Kuomintang and engaged in the Long March.

During the Second Sino-Japanese War from 1937 to 1945, the CCP's military forces were nominally integrated into the National Revolutionary Army of the Republic of China, forming two main units, the Eighth Route Army and the New Fourth Army. During this time, these two military groups primarily employed guerrilla tactics, generally avoiding large-scale battles with the Japanese, and at the same time consolidating by recruiting KMT troops and paramilitary forces behind Japanese lines into their forces.

After the Japanese surrender in 1945, the CCP continued to use the National Revolutionary Army unit structures, until the decision was made in February 1947 to merge the Eighth Route Army and New Fourth Army. On October 10, 1947, the "Manifesto of the Chinese People's Liberation Army" was published, renaming the new million-strong force the People's Liberation Army (PLA). The reorganization was completed by late 1948. The PLA eventually won the Chinese Civil War, establishing the People's Republic of China in 1949.

=== Establishment of the People's Republic of China ===
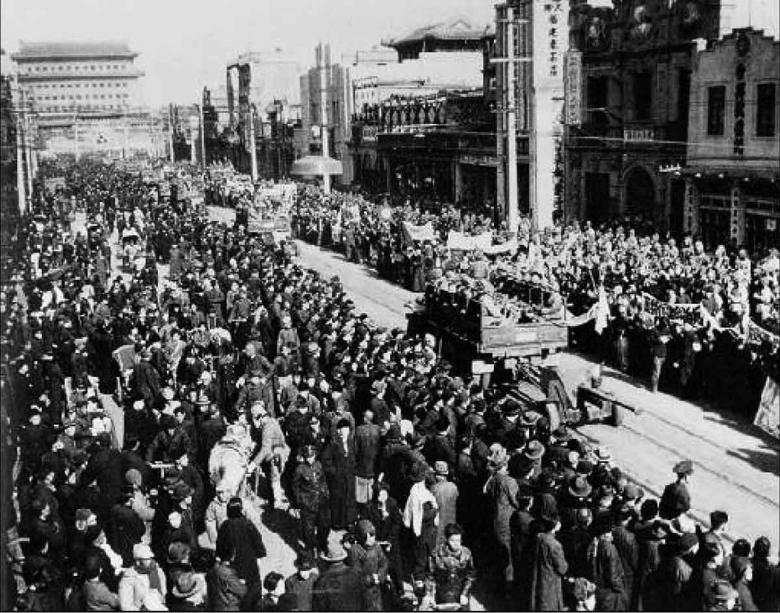
PLA troops entering Beijing in 1949 during the Chinese Civil War

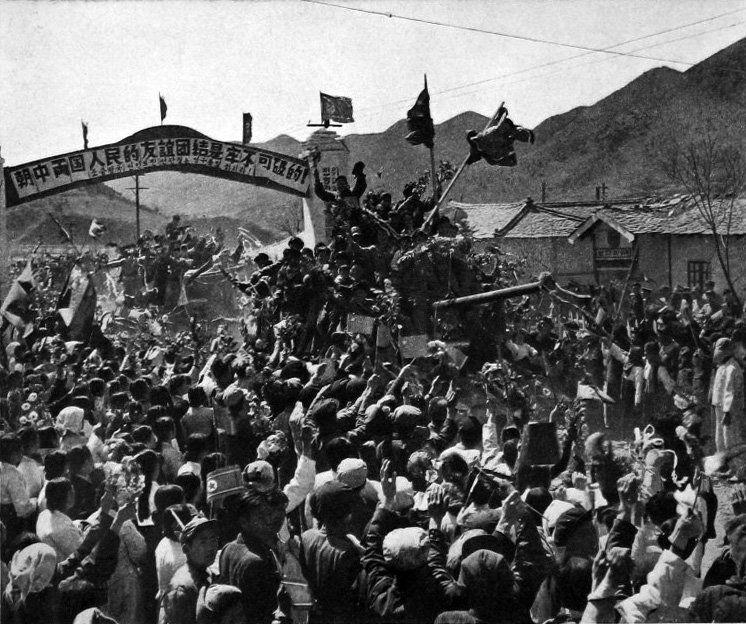
Chinese troops gathered on a T-34/85 or a Type 58 medium tank leaving North Korea in 1958, 5 years after the Korean War ended with an armistice (a ceasefire) in 1953. The banner in the background of the picture bears a slogan (in Chinese) which declares "The Friendship And Unity of the North Korean And Chinese Peoples Are Always Steadfast And Strong!"

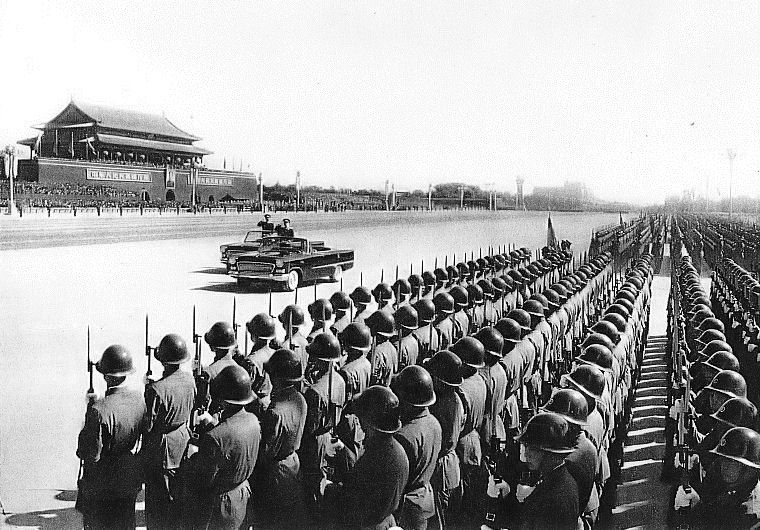
Marshal Lin Biao surveying the soldiers during the 10th-anniversary military parade in 1959

After the establishment of the PRC, the PLA underwent a drastic reorganization, with the establishment of the Air Force leadership structure in November 1949, followed by the Navy leadership structure the following April.

In this early period, the People's Liberation Army overwhelmingly consisted of peasants. Its treatment of soldiers and officers was egalitarian and formal ranks were not adopted until 1955. As a result of its egalitarian organization, the early PLA overturned strict traditional hierarchies that governed the lives of peasants. As sociologist Alessandro Russo summarizes, the peasant composition of the PLA hierarchy was a radical break with Chinese societal norms and "overturned the strict traditional hierarchies in unprecedented forms of egalitarianism[.]"

During the 1950s, the PLA with Soviet assistance began to transform itself from a peasant army into a modern one. In 1952 the PLA issued its initial blueprint for military modernization, which ultimately led to new strategic guidelines in 1956.

In the PRC's early years, the PLA was a dominant foreign policy institution in the country. Since 1949, China has used nine different military strategies, which the PLA calls "strategic guidelines". The most important came in 1956, 1980, and 1993.

In November 1950, some units of the PLA under the name of the People's Volunteer Army intervened in the Korean War as United Nations forces under General Douglas MacArthur approached the Yalu River. Under the weight of this offensive, Chinese forces drove MacArthur's forces out of North Korea and captured Seoul, but were subsequently pushed back south of Pyongyang north of the 38th Parallel. The war also catalyzed the rapid modernization of the People's Liberation Army Air Force (PLAAF).

In 1962, the PLA Ground Force also fought India in the Sino-Indian War. In a series of border clashes in 1967 with Indian troops, the PLA suffered heavy numerical and tactical losses.

Before the Cultural Revolution, military region commanders tended to remain in their posts for long periods. The longest-serving military region commanders were Xu Shiyou in the Nanjing Military Region (1954–74), Yang Dezhi in the Jinan Military Region (1958–74), Chen Xilian in the Shenyang Military Region (1959–73), and Han Xianchu in the Fuzhou Military Region (1960–74). In May 1965 during the Cultural Revolution, PLA abandoned the use of the military ranks that it had adopted in 1955. The Central Military Commission had deemed that ranks were an expression of bourgeois right and hierarchy which led to individualist attitudes, inequality, and a sense of disunity. This was reversed in September 1988.

The establishment of a professional military force equipped with modern weapons and doctrine was the last of the Four Modernizations announced by Zhou Enlai and supported by Deng Xiaoping. In keeping with Deng's mandate to reform, the PLA has demobilized millions of men and women since 1978 and has introduced modern methods in such areas as recruitment and manpower, strategy, and education and training. In 1979, the PLA fought Vietnam over a border skirmish in the Sino-Vietnamese War where both sides claimed victory. However, western analysts generally agree that Vietnam handily outperformed the PLA.

During the Sino-Soviet split, strained relations between China and the Soviet Union resulted in bloody border clashes and mutual backing of each other's adversaries. China and Afghanistan had neutral relations with each other during the King's rule. When the pro-Soviet Afghan Communists seized power in Afghanistan in 1978, relations between China and the Afghan communists quickly turned hostile. The Afghan pro-Soviet communists supported China's enemies in Vietnam and blamed China for supporting Afghan anticommunist militants. China responded to the Soviet invasion of Afghanistan by supporting the Afghan mujahidin and ramping up their military presence near Afghanistan in Xinjiang. China acquired military equipment from the United States to defend itself from Soviet attacks.

The PLA Ground Force trained and supported the Afghan Mujahideen during the Soviet-Afghan War, moving its training camps for the mujahideen from Pakistan into China itself. Hundreds of millions of dollars' worth of anti-aircraft missiles, rocket launchers, and machine guns were given to the Mujahideen by the Chinese. Chinese military advisors and army troops were also present with the Mujahideen during training.

=== Since 1980 ===
In 1981, the PLA conducted its largest military exercise in North China since the founding of the People's Republic.

In the late 1980s, the central government had increasing expenditures and limited revenue. The central government encouraged its agencies and encouraged local governments to expand their services and pursue revenues. The PLA established businesses including hotels and restaurants. The PLA gained more autonomy and permission to engage in commercial activities in exchange for a reduced role in political affairs and limited budgets; the military was downsized to free resources for economic development. The lack of oversight, ineffective self-regulation, and Jiang Zemin's and Hu Jintao's lack of close personal ties to the PLA led to systemic corruption that persisted through the late-2010s. Jiang's attempt to divest the PLA of its commercial interests was only partially successful, as many were still run by close associates of PLA officers. Corruption lowered readiness and proficiency, was a barrier to modernization and professionalization, and eroded party control. The 2010s anti-corruption campaigns and military reforms under Xi Jinping from the early-2010s were in part executed to address these problems.

Following the PLA's suppression of the 1989 Tiananmen Square protests and massacre, ideological correctness was temporarily revived as the dominant theme in Chinese military affairs. Reform and modernization have today resumed their position as the PLA's primary objectives, although the armed forces' political loyalty to the CCP has remained a leading concern.

Beginning in the 1980s, the PLA tried to transform itself from a land-based power centered on a vast ground force to a smaller, more mobile, high-tech one capable of mounting operations beyond its borders. The motivation for this was that a massive land invasion by Russia was no longer seen as a major threat, and the new threats to China are seen to be a declaration of independence by Taiwan, possibly with assistance from the United States, or a confrontation over the Spratly Islands.

In 1985, the PLA changed from being constantly prepared to "hit early, strike hard, and to fight a nuclear war" to developing the military in an era of peace. The PLA reoriented itself to modernization, improving its fighting ability, and becoming a world-class force. Deng Xiaoping stressed that the PLA needed to focus more on quality rather than on quantity.

The decision of the Chinese government in 1985 to reduce the size of the military by one million was completed by 1987. Staffing in military leadership was cut by about 50 percent. During the Ninth Five Year Plan (1996–2000) the PLA was reduced by a further 500,000. The PLA had also been expected to be reduced by another 200,000 by 2005. The PLA has focused on increasing mechanization and informatization to be able to fight a high-intensity war.

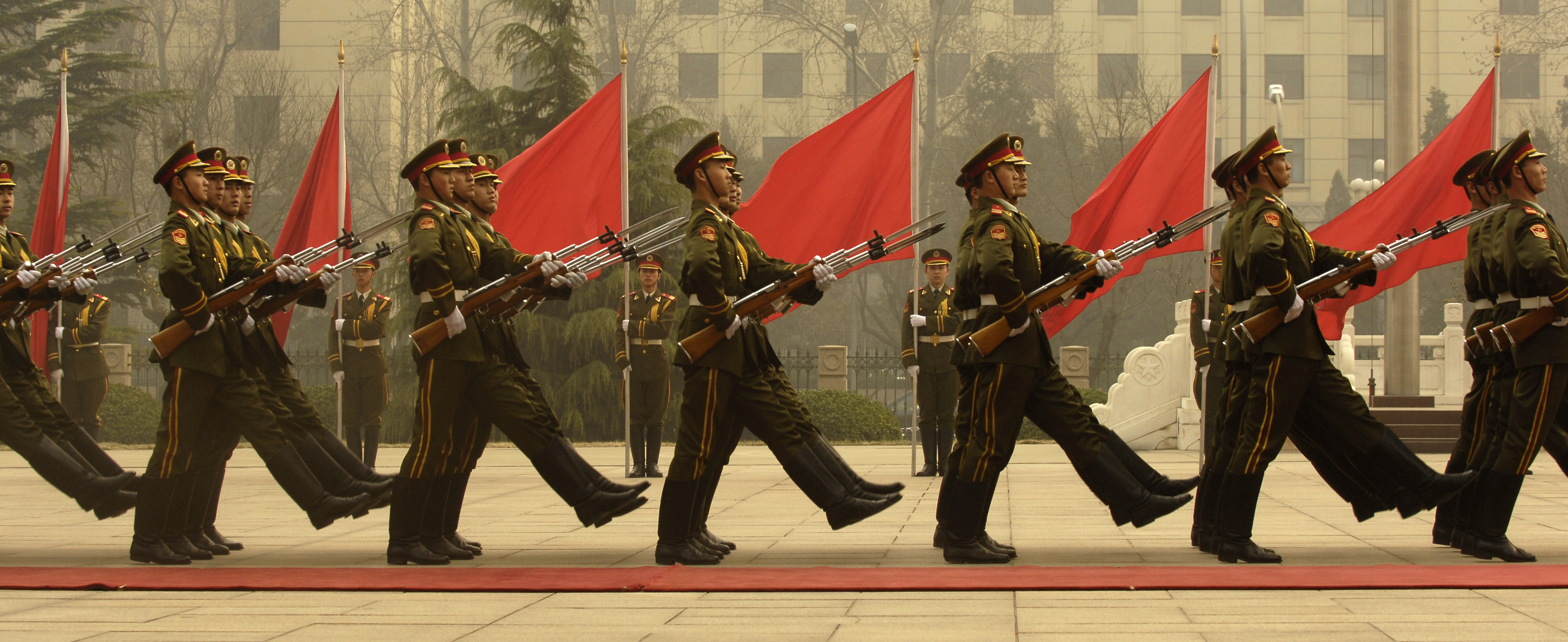
The PLA Honor Guard in Beijing, 2007

Former CMC chairman Jiang in 1990 called on the military to "meet political standards, be militarily competent, have a good working style, adhere strictly to discipline, and provide vigorous logistic support" (Chinese: 政治合格、军事过硬、作风优良、纪律严明、保障有力; pinyin: zhèngzhì hégé, jūnshì guòyìng, zuòfēng yōuliáng, jìlǜ yánmíng, bǎozhàng yǒulì). The 1991 Gulf War provided the Chinese leadership with a stark realization that the PLA was an oversized, almost-obsolete force. The USA's sending of two aircraft carrier groups to the vicinity of Taiwan during the Third Taiwan Strait Crisis prompted Jiang to order a ten-year PLA modernization program.

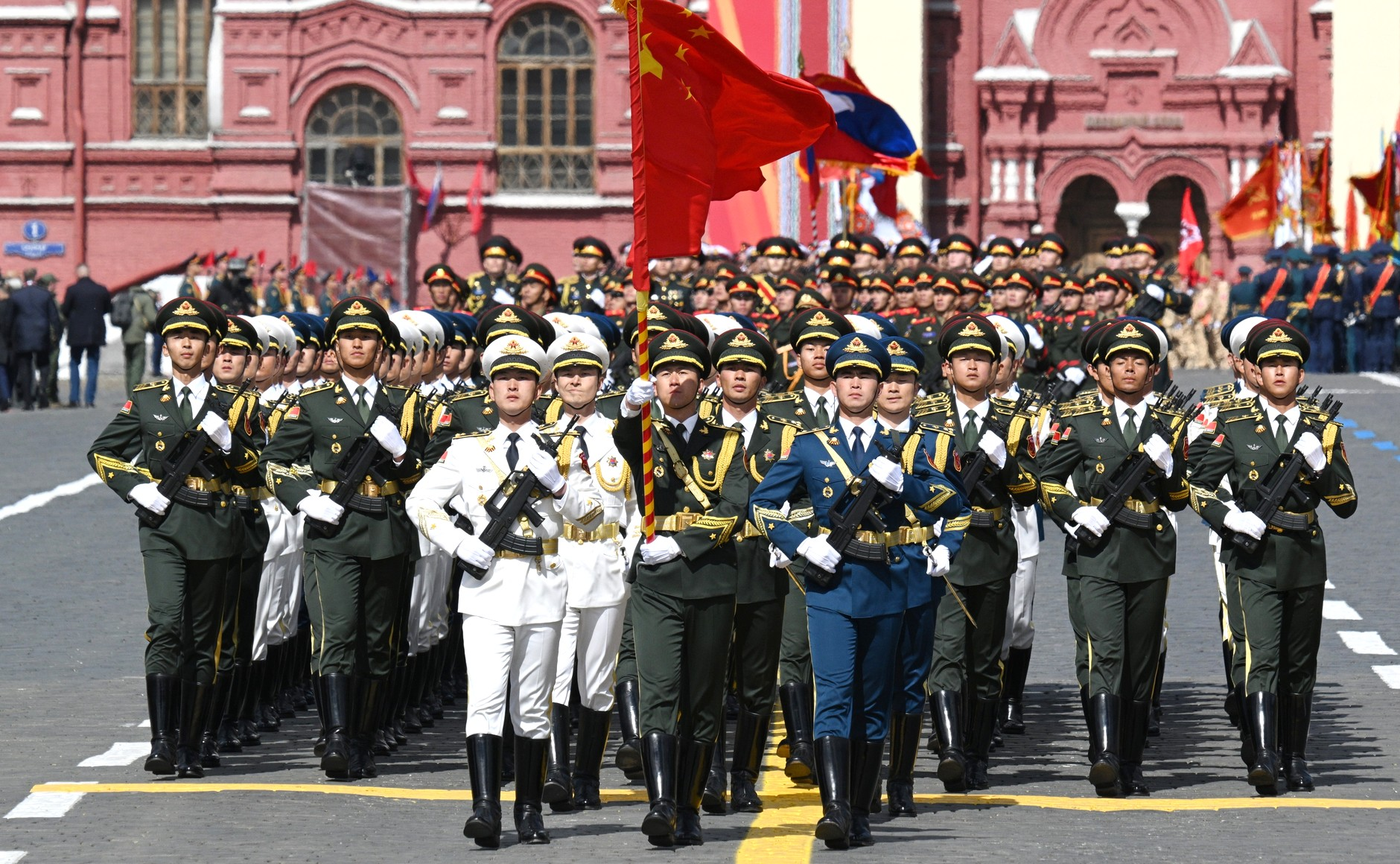
People's Liberation Army on Red Square in Moscow during the Victory Day parade on 9 May 2025

The possibility of a militarized Japan has also been a continuous concern to the Chinese leadership since the late 1990s. In addition, China's military leadership has been reacting to and learning from the successes and failures of the United States Armed Forces during the Kosovo War, the 2001 invasion of Afghanistan, the 2003 invasion of Iraq, and the Iraqi insurgency. All these lessons inspired China to transform the PLA from a military based on quantity to one based on quality. Chairman Jiang Zemin officially made a "revolution in military affairs" (RMA) part of the official national military strategy in 1993 to modernize the Chinese armed forces.

A goal of the RMA is to transform the PLA into a force capable of winning what it calls "local wars under high-tech conditions" rather than a massive, numbers-dominated ground-type war. Chinese military planners call for short decisive campaigns, limited in both their geographic scope and their political goals. In contrast to the past, more attention is given to reconnaissance, mobility, and deep reach. This new vision has shifted resources towards the navy and air force. The PLA is also actively preparing for space warfare and cyber-warfare.

In 2002, the PLA began holding military exercises with militaries from other countries. From 2018 to 2023, more than half of these exercises have focused on military training other than war, generally antipiracy, or antiterrorism exercises involving combatting non-state actors. In 2009, the PLA held its first military exercise in Africa, a humanitarian and medical training practice conducted in Gabon.

For the past 10 to 20 years, the PLA has acquired some advanced weapons systems from Russia, including Sovremenny-class destroyers, Sukhoi Su-27 and Kilo-class diesel-electric submarines. It has also started to produce several new classes of destroyers and frigates including the Type 052D class guided-missile destroyer. In addition, the PLAAF has designed its very own Chengdu J-10 fighter aircraft and a new stealth fighter, the Chengdu J-20. The PLA launched the new Jin class nuclear submarines on 3 December 2004 capable of launching nuclear warheads that could strike targets across the Pacific Ocean and have three aircraft carriers, with the latest, the Fujian, launched in 2022.

From 2014 to 2015, the PLA deployed 524 medical staff on a rotational basis to combat the Ebola virus outbreak in Liberia, Sierra Leone, Guinea, and Guinea-Bissau. As of 2023, this was the PLA's largest medical assistance mission in another country.

China re-organized its military from 2015 to 2016. In 2015, the PLA formed new units including the PLA Ground Force, the PLA Rocket Force, and the PLA Strategic Support Force. In 2016, the CMC replaced the four traditional military departments with a number of new bodies. China replaced its system of seven military regions with newly established Theater Commands: Northern, Southern, Western, Eastern, and Central. In the prior system, operations were segmented by military branch and region. In contrast, each Theater Command is intended to function as a unified entity with joint operations across different military branches.

The PLA on 1 August 2017 marked its 90th anniversary. Before the big anniversary it mounted its biggest parade yet and the first outside of Beijing, held in the Zhurihe Training Base in the Northern Theater Command (within the Inner Mongolia Autonomous Region).

In December 2023, Reuters reported a military leadership purge after high-ranking generals were ousted from the National People's Congress. Prior to 2017, over sixty generals were investigated and sacked.

=== Overseas deployments and UN peacekeeping operations ===
In addition to its Support Base in Djibouti, the PLA operates a base in Tajikistan and a listening station in Cuba. The Espacio Lejano Station in Argentina is operated by a PLA unit. The PLAN has also undertaken rotational deployments of its warships at the Ream Naval Base in Cambodia.

The People's Republic of China has sent the PLA to various hotspots as part of China's role as a prominent member of the United Nations. Such units usually include engineers and logistical units and members of the paramilitary People's Armed Police and have been deployed as part of peacekeeping operations in Lebanon, the Republic of the Congo, Sudan, Ivory Coast, Haiti, and more recently, Mali and South Sudan.

=== Engagements ===
- 1927–1950: Chinese Civil War
- 1937–1945: Second Sino-Japanese War
- 1949: Yangtze incident against British warships on the Yangtze River
- 1949: Incorporation of Xinjiang into the People's Republic of China
- 1950: Annexation of Tibet by the People's Republic of China
- 1950–1953: Korean War under the banner of the Chinese People's Volunteer Army
- 1954–1955: First Taiwan Strait Crisis
- 1955–1970: Vietnam War
- 1958: Second Taiwan Strait Crisis at Quemoy and Matsu
- 1962: Sino-Indian War
- 1967: Border skirmishes with India
- 1969: Sino-Soviet border conflict
- 1974: Battle of the Paracel Islands with South Vietnam
- 1979: Sino-Vietnamese War
- 1979–1990: Sino-Vietnamese conflicts
- 1988: Johnson South Reef Skirmish with Vietnam
- 1989: Enforcement of martial law in Beijing during the 1989 Tiananmen Square protests and massacre
- 1990: Barin uprising
- 1995–1996: Third Taiwan Strait Crisis
- 2007–present: UNIFIL peacekeeping operations in Lebanon
- 2009–present: Anti-piracy operations in the Gulf of Aden
- 2014: Search and rescue efforts for Malaysia Airlines Flight 370
- 2014: UN peacekeeping operations in Mali
- 2015: UNMISS peacekeeping operations in South Sudan
- 2020–2021: China–India skirmishes

As of at least early 2024, China has not fought a war since 1979 and has only fought relatively minor conflicts since.

== Organization ==
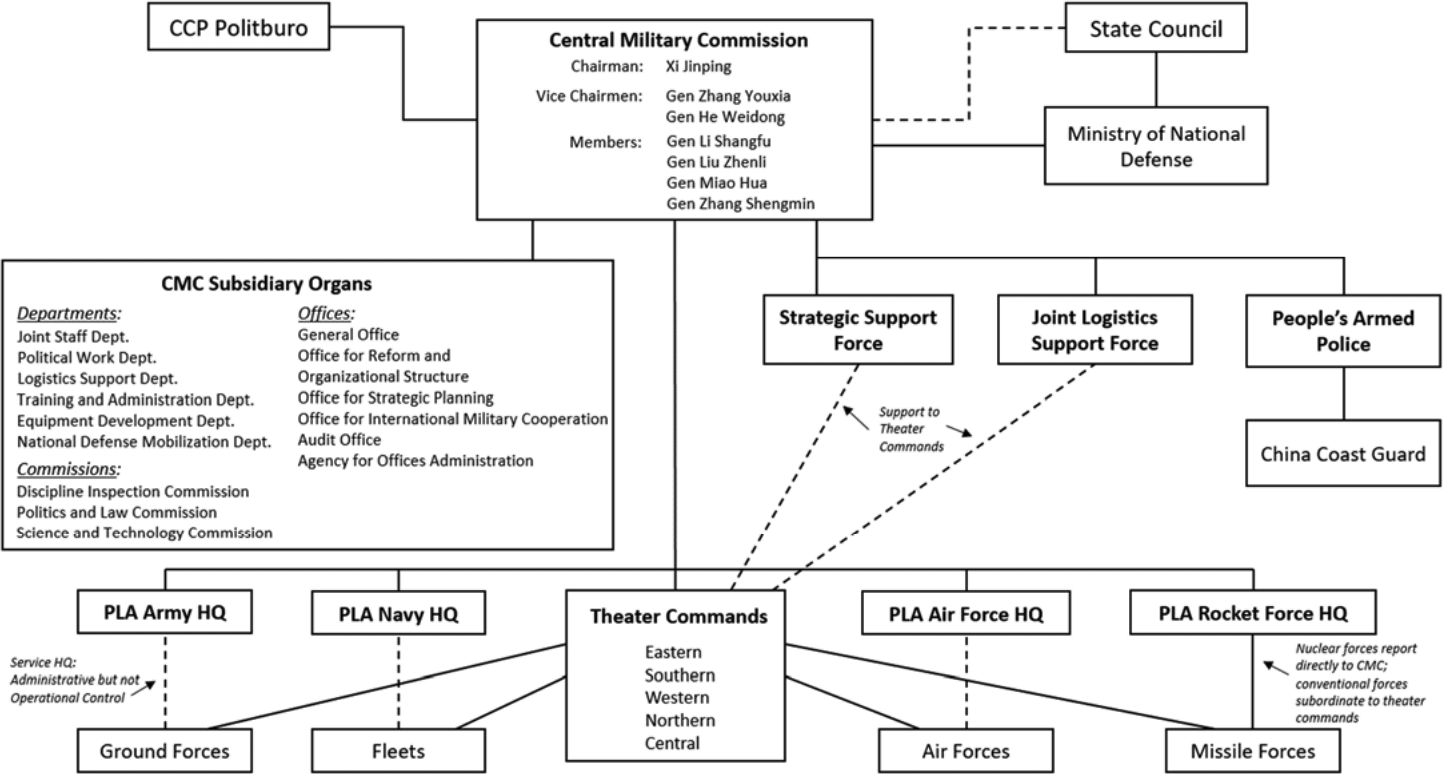
Organizational chart of the People's Liberation Army

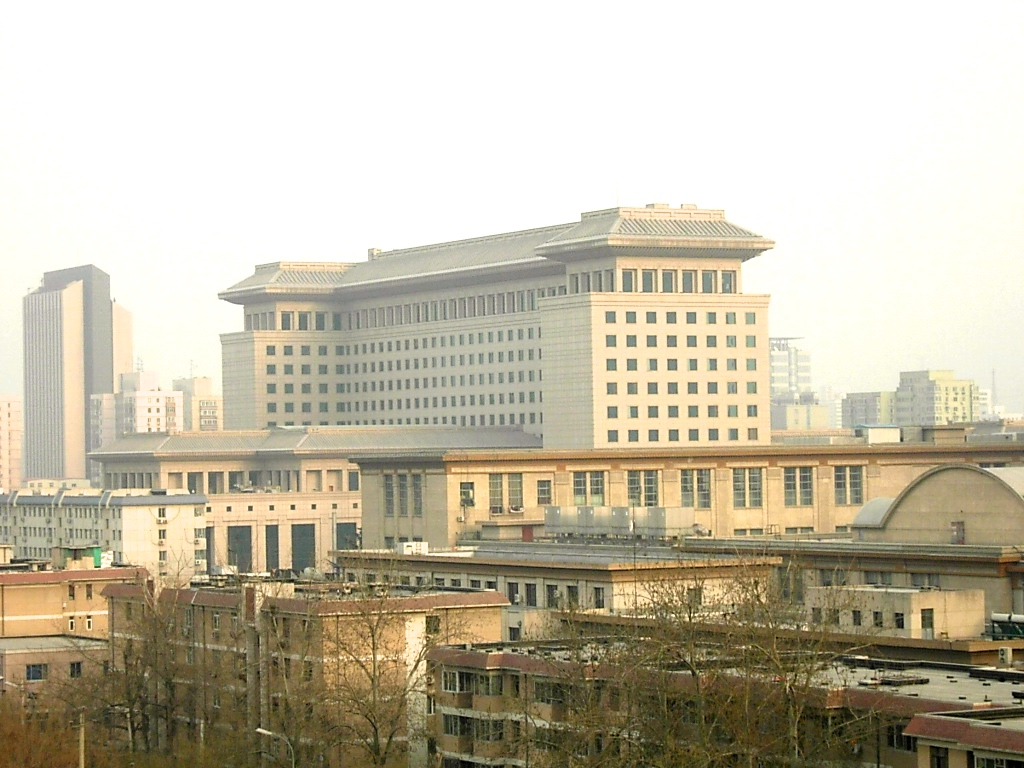
The CMC is ceremonially housed in the Ministry of National Defense compound ("August 1st Building").

The PLA is a component of the armed forces of China, which also includes the PAP, the reserves, and the militia. The armed forces are controlled by the CCP under the doctrine of "the Party commands the gun". The PLA and the PAP have the largest delegation in the National People's Congress (NPC), which are elected by servicemember election committees of top-level military subdivisions, including the PLA's theater commands and service branches. At the 14th National People's Congress; the joint delegation has 281 deputies—over 9% of the total—all of whom are CCP members.

=== Central Military Commission ===
The PLA is governed by the Central Military Commission (CMC); under the arrangement of "one institution with two names", there exists a state CMC and a Party CMC, although both commissions have identical personnel, organization and function, and effectively work as a single body. The only difference in membership between the two occurs for a few months every five years, during the period between a Party National Congress, when Party CMC membership changes, and the next ensuing National People's Congress, when the state CMC changes.

The CMC is composed of a chairman, vice chairpersons and regular members. The chairman of the CMC is the commander-in-chief of the PLA, with the post generally held by the paramount leader of China; since 1989, the post has generally been held together with the CCP general secretary. Per the chairman responsibility system, the CMC chairman exercises absolute control over the CMC and the overall military. Unlike in other countries, the Ministry of National Defense and its Minister do not have command authority, largely acting as diplomatic liaisons of the CMC, insulating the PLA from external influence. However, except for the current incumbent, Admiral Dong Jun, the Minister has always been a member of the CMC.

The Membership of the Central Military Commission

Chairman

- Xi Jinping (also General Secretary, President and Commander-in-chief of Joint Battle Command)

Vice Chairmen

- General Zhang Youxia
- General Zhang Shengmin

Members

- Chief of the Joint Staff Department (JSD) – General Liu Zhenli
- Secretary of the Commission for Discipline Inspection – General Zhang Shengmin

Previously, the PLA was governed by four general departments; the General Political, the General Logistics, the General Armament, and the General Staff Departments. These were abolished in 2016 under the military reforms undertaken by Xi Jinping, replaced with 15 new functional departments directly reporting to the CMC:

1. General Office
2. Joint Staff Department
3. Political Work Department
4. Logistic Support Department
5. Equipment Development Department
6. Training and Administration Department
7. National Defense Mobilization Department
8. Discipline Inspection Commission
9. Politics and Legal Affairs Commission
10. Science and Technology Commission
11. Office for Strategic Planning
12. Office for Reform and Organizational Structure
13. Office for International Military Cooperation
14. Audit Office
15. Agency for Offices Administration

Included among the 15 departments are three commissions. The CMC Discipline Inspection Commission is charged with rooting out corruption.

=== Political control ===
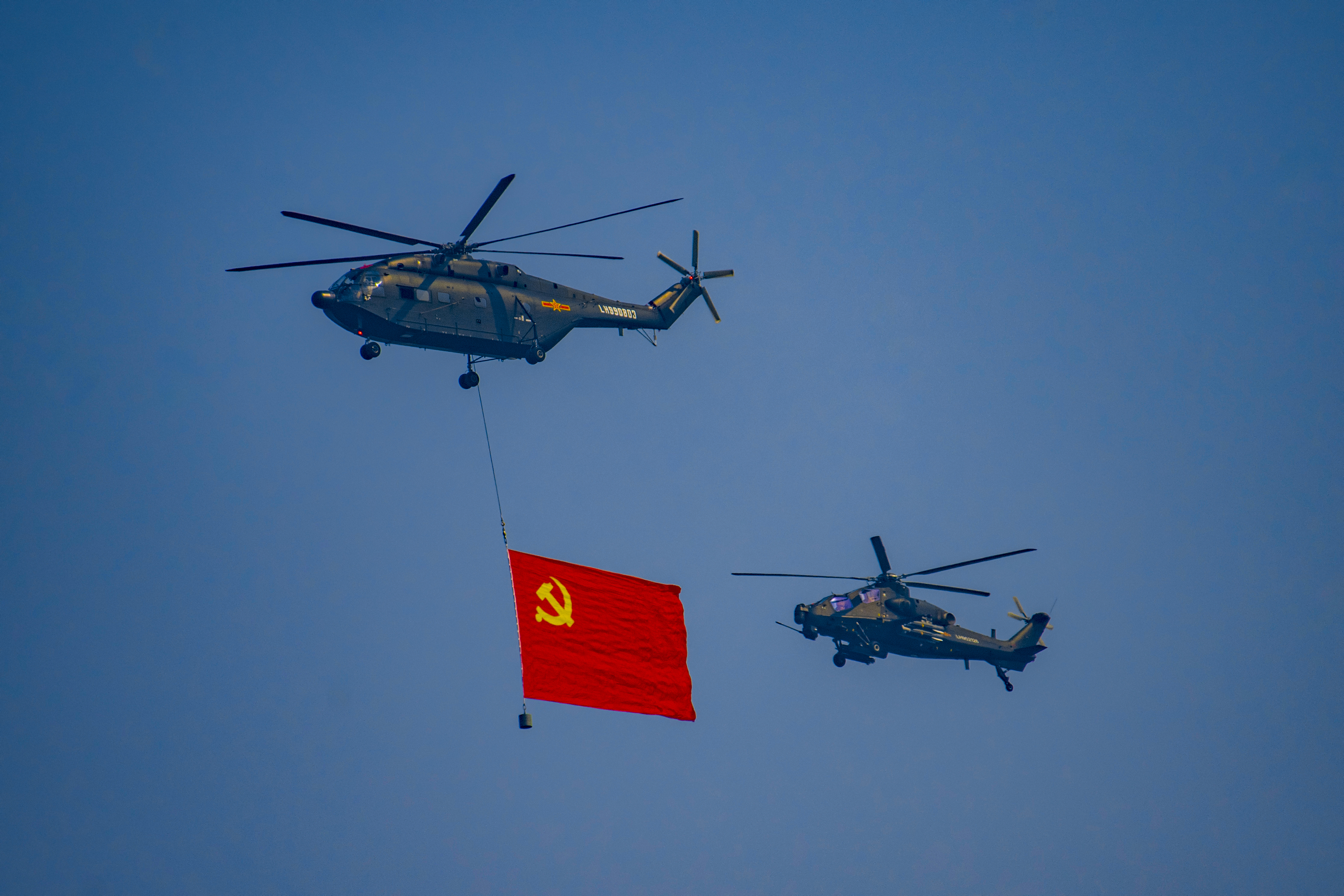
The People's Liberation Army raising the flag of the Chinese Communist Party during a military parade marking the 70th anniversary of the People's Republic of China on 1 October 2019.

The CCP maintains absolute control over the PLA. It requires the PLA to undergo political education, instilling CCP ideology in its members. Additionally, China maintains a political commissar system. Regimental or brigade level and higher units maintain CCP committees and political commissars (Chinese: 政治委员 or 政委). Additionally, battalion-level and company-level units respectively maintain political directors and political instructors. The political commissars are officially equal to commanders in status. The political commissars are officially responsible for the implementation of party committee decisions, instilling and maintaining party discipline, providing political education, and working with other components of the political work system.

Key decisions in the PLA are generally made in the CCP committees throughout the military. As a rule, the political commissar serves as the party committee secretary while the commander serves as the deputy secretary. Political commissars report to higher-level party committees, rather than military commanders. Due to the CCP's system of absolute control, non-CCP political parties and groups and organizations except the Communist Youth League of China are not allowed to establish organizations or have members in the PLA. Additionally, only the CCP is allowed to appoint the leading cadres at all levels of the PLA.

=== Non-fraternization ===
Fraternization between senior cadres and PLA officers is prohibited without authorization. Politburo members must apply to the Politburo Standing Committee before visiting PLA units and once approved, visits must be arranged by the CMC.

CMC approval is required before a PLA general can be involved in national or regional civil affairs.

=== Grades ===
Grades determine the command hierarchy from the CMC to the platoon level. Entities command lower-graded entities, and coordinate with like-graded entities. An organization's grade impacts the resources allocated to it. Since 1988, all organizations, billets, and officers in the PLA have a grade.

Civil–military relations within the wider state bureaucracy is also influenced by grades. The grading systems used by the armed forces and the government are parallel, making it easier for military entities to identify the civilian entities they should coordinate with. An officer's authority, eligibility for billets, pay, and retirement age is determined by grade. Career progression includes lateral transfers between billets of the same grade, but which are not considered promotions. An officer retiring to the civil service has their grade translated to the civil grade system; their grade continues to progress and draw retirement benefits through the civil system rather than the armed forces.

Historically, an officer's grade — or position (Chinese: 职务等级; pinyin: zhiwu dengji) — was more important than their rank (Chinese: 军衔; pinyin: junxian). Historically, time-in-grade and time-in-rank requirements and promotions were not synchronized; multiple ranks were present in each grade with all having the same authority. Rank was mainly a visual aid to roughly determine relative position when interacting with Chinese and foreign personnel. PLA etiquette preferred addressing personnel by position rather than by rank. Reforms to a more rank-centric system began in 2021. In 2023, a revised grade structure associated one rank per grade, with some ranks spanning multiple grades.

=== Operational control ===
The five theatre commands of the PLA

Operational control of combat units is divided between the service headquarters and domestic geographically based theatre commands.

Theatre commands are multi-service ("joint") organizations that are broadly responsible for strategy, plans, tactics, and policy specific to their assigned area of responsibility. In wartime, they will likely have full control of subordinate units; in peacetime, units also report to their service headquarters. Force-building is the responsibility of the services and the CMC. The five theatre commands, in order of stated significance are:

- Eastern Theater Command
- Southern Theater Command
- Western Theater Command
- Northern Theater Command
- Central Theater Command

The service headquarters retain operational control in some areas within China and outside of China. For example, army headquarters controls or is responsible for the Beijing Garrison, the Tibet Military District, the Xinjiang Military District, and border and coastal defences. The counterpiracy patrols in the Gulf of Aden are controlled by navy headquarters. The JSD nominally controls operations beyond China's periphery, but in practice this seems to apply only to army operations. Services and theater commands have the same grade. The overlap of areas or units of responsibility may create disputes requiring CMC arbitration.

As part of the 2015 reforms, military regions were replaced by theatre commands in 2016. Military regions were − uinlike the theatre commands − army-centric peacetime administrative organizations, and joint wartime commands were created on-demand by the army-dominated General Staff Department.

=== Organization table ===
Central Military Commission
Departments	Commissions	Offices	Arms	Research institutes
General Office	Discipline Inspection Commission	Office for Strategic Planning	Aerospace Force	Academy of Military Science
Joint Staff Department	Politics and Legal Affairs Commission	Office for Reform and Organizational Structure	Cyberspace Force	National Defence University
Political Work Department	Science and Technology Commission	Office for International Military Cooperation	Information Support Force	National University of Defense Technology
Logistic Support Department	Audit Office	Joint Logistics Support Force
Equipment Development Department	Agency for Offices Administration
Training and Administration Department
National Defense Mobilization Department
Theatre commands	Service Branches
Eastern Theater Command	PLA Ground Force
Western Theater Command	PLA Navy
Southern Theater Command	PLA Air Force
Northern Theater Command	PLA Rocket Force
Central Theater Command
People's Liberation Army

=== Academic institutions ===
There are two academic institutions directly subordinate to the CMC, the National Defense University and the National University of Defense Technology, and they are considered the two top military education institutions in China. There are also 35 institutions affiliated to the PLA's branches and arms, and 7 institutions affiliated to the People's Armed Police.

=== People's Armed Forces Department ===
People's Armed Forces Department (PAFD; Chinese: 人民武装部; pinyin: Rénmín wǔzhuāng bù) is a type of military department in China that is run by the People's Liberation Army (PLA). PAFDs have been established at the county and township administrative levels and in other large organizations such as state-owned enterprises and schools.

== Service branches ==
The PLA consists of four services (Ground Force, Navy, Air Force, and Rocket Force) and four arms (Aerospace Force, Cyberspace Force, Information Support Force, and Joint Logistics Support Force).

=== Services ===
The PLA maintains four services (Chinese: 军种; pinyin: jūnzhǒng): the Ground Force, the Navy, the Air Force, and the Rocket Force. Following the 200,000 and 300,000 personnel reduction announced in 2003 and 2005 respectively, the total strength of the PLA has been reduced from 2.5 million to around 2 million. The reductions came mainly from non-combat ground forces, which would allow more funds to be diverted to naval, air, and strategic missile forces. This shows China's shift from ground force prioritization to emphasizing air and naval power with high-tech equipment for offensive roles over disputed territories, particularly in the South China Sea.

==== Ground Force ====
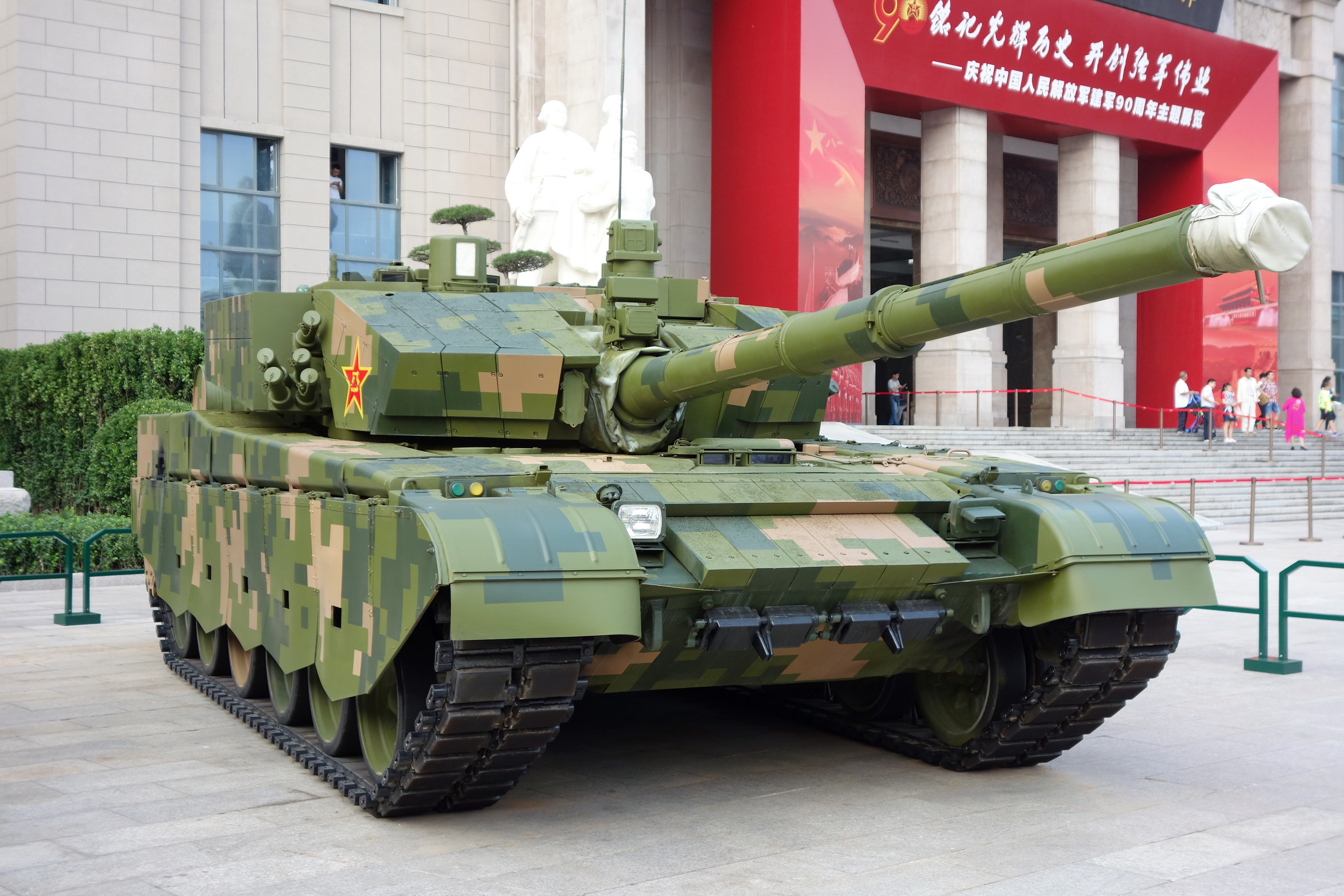
A Type 99A main battle tank in service with the PLAGF

The PLA Ground Force (PLAGF) is the largest of the PLA's five services with 960,000 active duty personnel, approximately half of the PLA's total manpower of around 2 million personnel. The PLAGF is organized into twelve active duty group armies sequentially numbered from the 71st Group Army to the 83rd Group Army which are distributed to each of the PRC's five theatre commands, receiving two to three group armies per command. In wartime, numerous PLAGF reserve and paramilitary units may be mobilized to augment these active group armies. The PLAGF reserve component comprises approximately 510,000 personnel divided into thirty infantry and twelve anti-aircraft artillery (AAA) divisions. The PLAGF is led by Commander Li Qiaoming and Political Commissar Chen Hui (general).

==== Navy ====
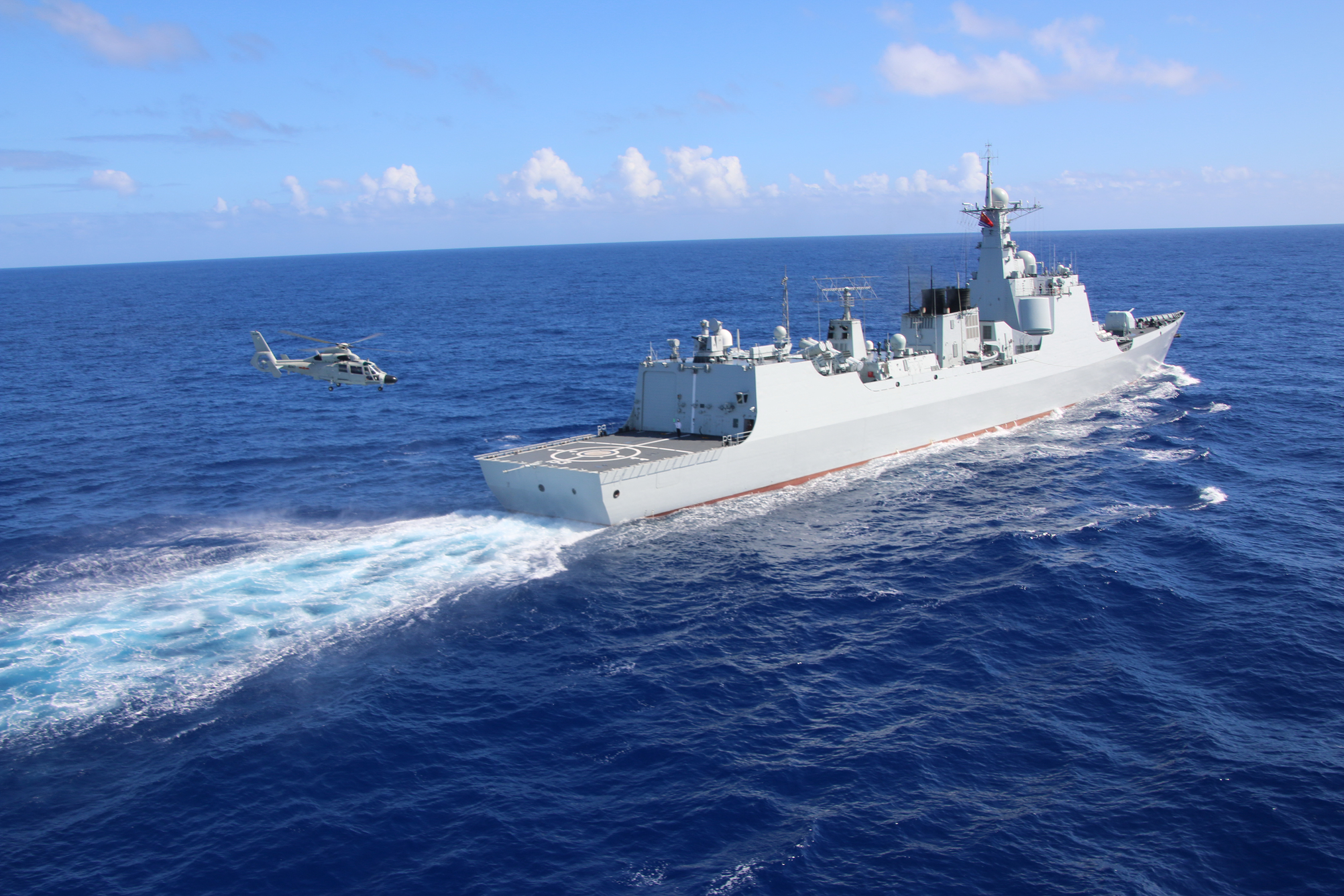
A PLAN destroyer conducting maritime interdiction operations at RIMPAC 2016

Until the early 1990s, the PLA Navy (PLAN) performed a subordinate role to the PLA Ground Force (PLAGF). Since then it has undergone rapid modernisation. The 300,000 strong PLAN is organized into three major fleets: the North Sea Fleet headquartered at Qingdao, the East Sea Fleet headquartered at Ningbo, and the South Sea Fleet headquartered in Zhanjiang. Each fleet consists of a number of surface ship, submarine, naval air force, coastal defence, and marine units.

The navy includes a 25,000 strong Marine Corps (organised into seven brigades), a 18,000 strong Naval Aviation Force operating several hundred attack helicopters and fixed-wing aircraft. As part of its overall programme of naval modernisation, the PLAN is in the stage of developing a blue water navy. In November 2012, then Party General Secretary Hu Jintao reported to the CCP's 18th National Congress his desire to "enhance our capacity for exploiting marine resource and build China into a strong maritime power". According to the United States Department of Defense, the PLAN has numerically the largest navy in the world. The PLAN is led by Commander Hu Zhongming and Political Commissar is currently vacant.

==== Air Force ====
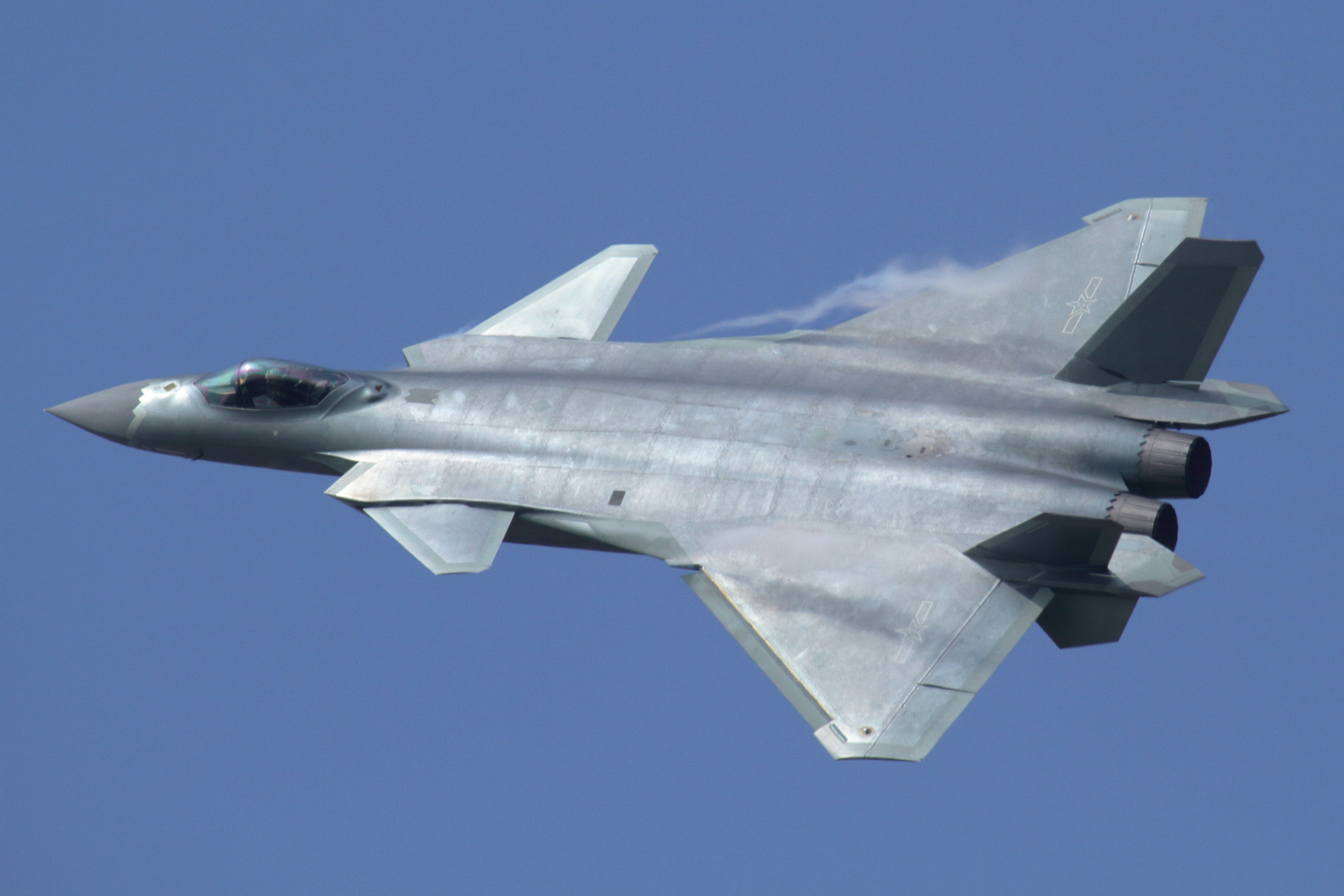
A Chengdu J-20 5th generation stealth fighter

The 403,000 strong People's Liberation Army Air Force (PLAAF) was organized into five Theatre Command Air Forces (TCAF) and 24 air divisions. As of 2024, the system has been changed into 11 Corps Deputy-grade "Bases" controlling air brigades. Divisions have been mostly converted to brigades, although some (specifically the Bomber divisions, and some of the special mission units) remain operational as divisions. The largest operational units within the Aviation Corps is the air division, which has 2 to 3 aviation regiments, each with 20 to 36 aircraft. An Air Brigade has from 24 to 50 aircraft.

The surface-to-air missile (SAM) Corps is organized into SAM divisions and brigades. There are also three airborne divisions manned by the PLAAF. J-XX and XXJ are names applied by Western intelligence agencies to describe programs by the People's Republic of China to develop one or more fifth-generation fighter aircraft. The PLAAF is led by Commander Chang Dingqiu and Political Commissar Guo Puxiao.

==== Rocket Force ====
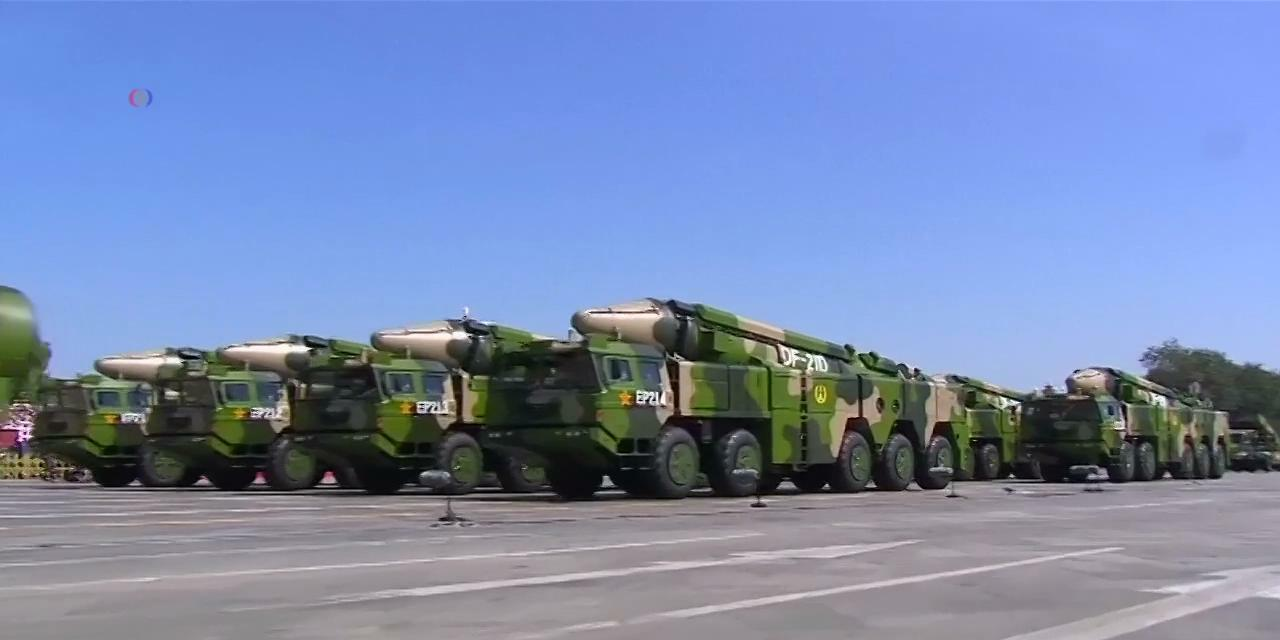
DF-21Ds at the 2015 Victory Parade

The People's Liberation Army Rocket Force (PLARF) is the main strategic missile force of the PLA and consists of at least 125,000 personnel. It controls China's nuclear and conventional strategic missiles. China's total nuclear arsenal size is estimated to be between 100 and 400 thermonuclear warheads. The PLARF is organized into bases sequentially numbered from 61 through 67, wherein the first six are operational and allocated to the nation's theatre commands while Base 67 serves as the PRC's central nuclear weapons storage facility. The PLARF is led by Commander Vacant and Political Commissar Xu Xisheng.

=== Arms ===
The PLA maintains four arms (Chinese: 兵种): the Aerospace Force, the Cyberspace Force, the Information Support Force, and the Joint Logistics Support Force. The four-arm system was established on 19 April 2024.

== Personnel ==
=== Recruitment and terms of service ===
The PLA began as an all-volunteer force. In 1955, as part of an effort to modernize the PLA, the first Military Service Law created a system of compulsory military service. Since the late 1970s, the PLA has been a hybrid force that combines conscripts and volunteers. Conscripts who fulfilled their service obligation can stay in the military as volunteer soldiers for a total of 16 years. De jure, military service with the PLA is obligatory for all Chinese citizens. However, mandatory military service has not been enacted in China since 1949. Due to the effect of the one-child policy, over 70 percent of the PLA and 80 percent of its combat troops come from one-child households, according to Liu Mingfu of the National Defense University.

=== Women and ethnic minorities ===
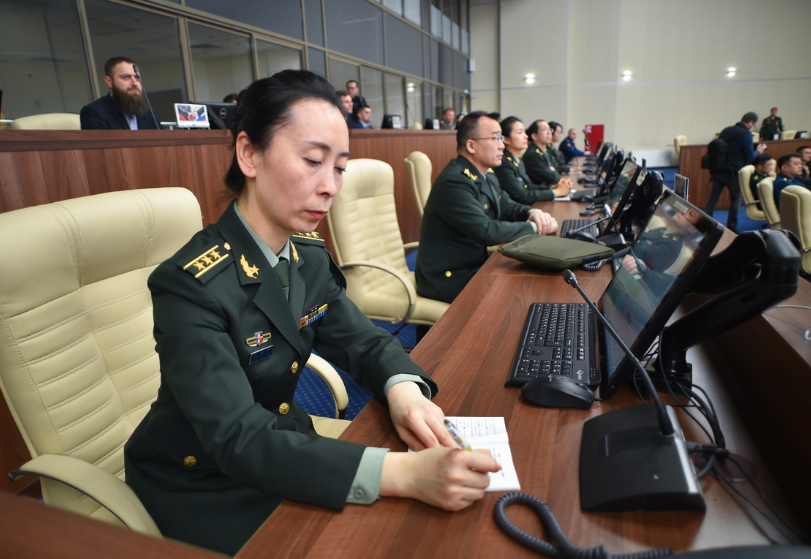
Female Colonel of the Joint Logistics Support Force

Women participated extensively in unconventional warfare, including in combat positions, in the Chinese Red Army during the revolutionary period, Chinese Civil War (1927–1949) and the Second Sino-Japanese War (1937–1945). After the establishment of the People's Republic of China, along with the People's Liberation Army (PLA)'s transition toward the conventional military organization, the role of women in the armed forces gradually reduced to support, medical, and logistics roles. It was considered a prestigious choice for women to join the military. Serving in the military opens up opportunities for education, training, higher status, and relocation to cities after completing the service. During the Cultural Revolution, military service was regarded as a privilege and a method to avoid the Down to the Countryside Movement.

In the 1980s, the PLA underwent large-scale demobilization amid the reform and opening up, and women were discharged back to civilian society for economic development while the exclusion of women in the military expanded. In the 1990s, the PLA revived the recruitment of female personnel in regular military formations but primarily focused on non-combat roles at specialized positions. Most women were trained in areas such as academic/engineering, medics, communications, intelligence, cultural work, and administrative work, as these positions conform to the traditional gender roles. Women in the PLA were more likely to be cadets and officers instead of enlisted soldiers because of their specializations. The military organization still preserved some female combat units as public exemplars of social equality.

Both enlisted and cadet women personnel underwent the same basic training as their male counterparts in the PLA, but many of them serve in predominantly female organizations. Due to ideological reasons, the regulation governing the segregation of sex in the PLA is prohibited, but a quasi-segregated arrangement for women's organizations is still applied through considerations of convenience. Women were likelier to hold commanding positions in female-heavy organizations such as medical, logistic, research, and political work units, but sometimes in combat units during peacetime. In PLAAF, women traditionally pilot transport aircraft or serve as crew members. There had been a small number of high-ranking female officials in the PLA since 1949, but the advancement of position had remained relatively uncommon. In the 2010s, women were increasingly serving in combat roles, in mixed-gender organizations alongside their male counterparts, and to the same physical standard.

The military actively promotes opportunities for women in the military, such as celebrating International Women's Day for the members of the armed forces, publicizing the number of firsts for female officers and enlisted personnel, including deployments with peacekeeping forces or serving on PLA Navy's first aircraft carrier, announcing female military achievements in state media, and promoting female special forces through news reports or popular media. PLA does not publish detailed gender composition of its armed forces, but the Jamestown Foundation estimated approximately 5% of the active military force in China is female.

National unity and territorial integrity are central themes of the Chinese Communist Revolution. The Chinese Red Army and the succeeding PLA actively recruited ethnic minorities. During the Chinese Civil War, Mongol cavalry units were formed. During the Korean War, as many as 50,000 ethnic Koreans in China volunteered to join the PLA. PLA's recruitment of minorities generally correlates to state policies. During the early years, minorities were given preferential treatment, with special attention given to recruitment and training. In the 1950s, ethnic Mongols accounted for 52% of all officers in Inner Mongolia military region. During the Great Leap Forward and Cultural Revolution, armed forces emphasized "socialist culture", assimilation policies, and the construction of common identities between soldiers of different ethnicities.

For ethnic minority cadets and officials, overall development follows national policies. Typically, minority officers hold officer positions in their home regions. Examples included over 34% of the battalion and regimental cadres in Yi autonomous region militia were of the Yi ethnicity, and 45% of the militia cadres in Tibetan local militia were of Tibetan ethnicity. Ethnical minorities achieved high-ranking positions in the PLA, and the percentage of appointments appears to follow the ratio of the Chinese population composition. Prominent figures included ethnic Mongol general Ulanhu, who served in high-ranking roles in the Inner Mongolian region and as vice president of China, and Saifuddin Azizi, a Lieutenant General and an ethnic Uyghur who served in the CCP Central Committee. There were a few instances of ethnic distrust within the PLA, with one prominent example being the defection of Margub Iskhakov, an ethnic Muslim Tatar PLA general, to the Soviet Union in the 1960s. However, his defection was largely attributed to his disillusion with the failed Great Leap Forward policies, instead of his ethnic background. In modern times, ethnic representation is most visible among junior-ranking officers. Only a few minorities reach the highest-ranking positions.

=== Rank structure ===
==== Officers ====
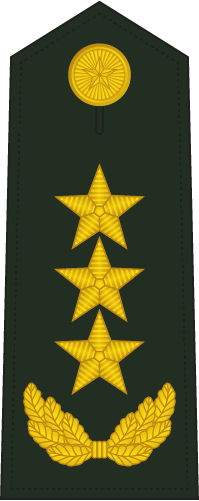
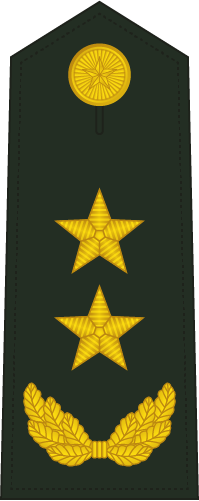
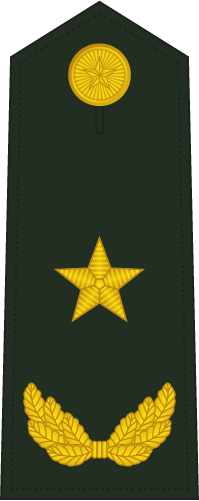
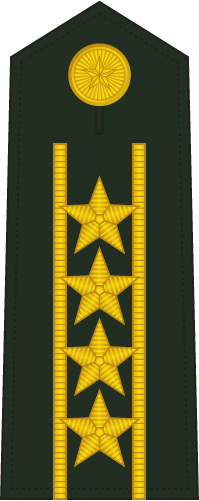
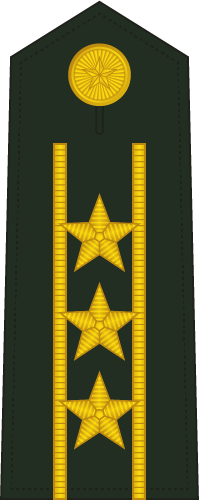
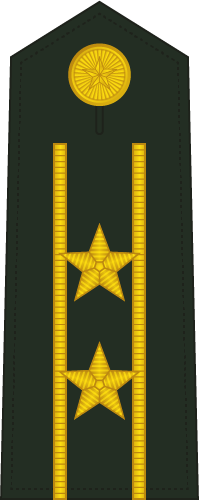
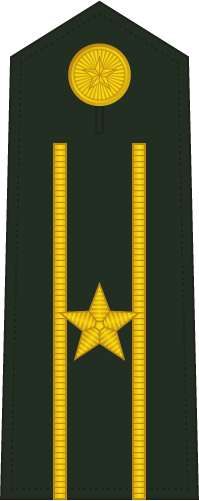
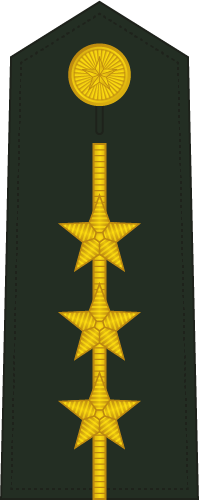
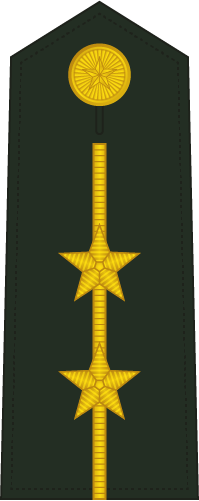
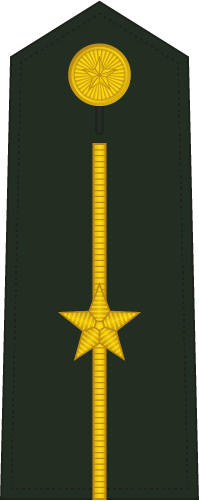
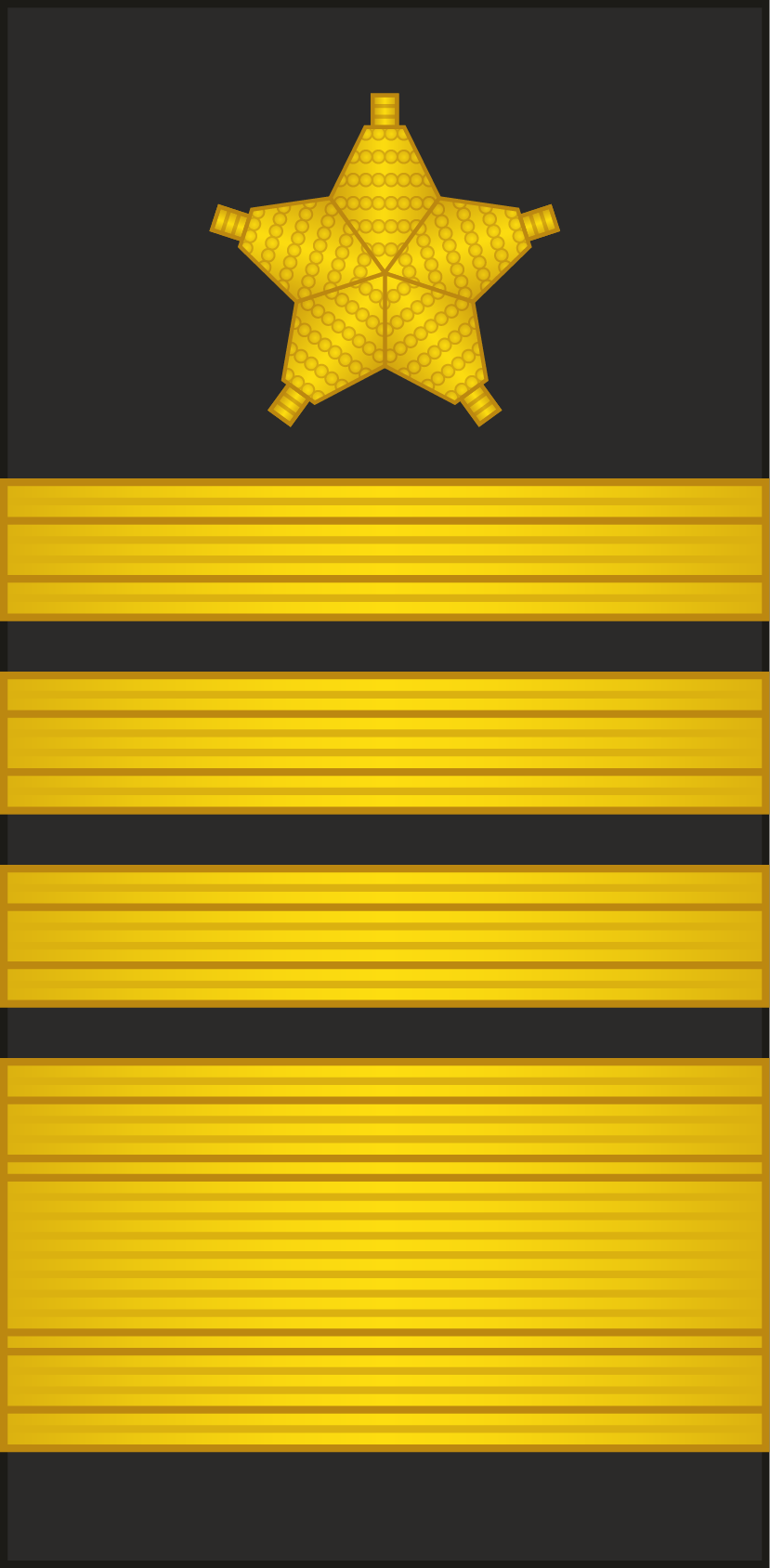
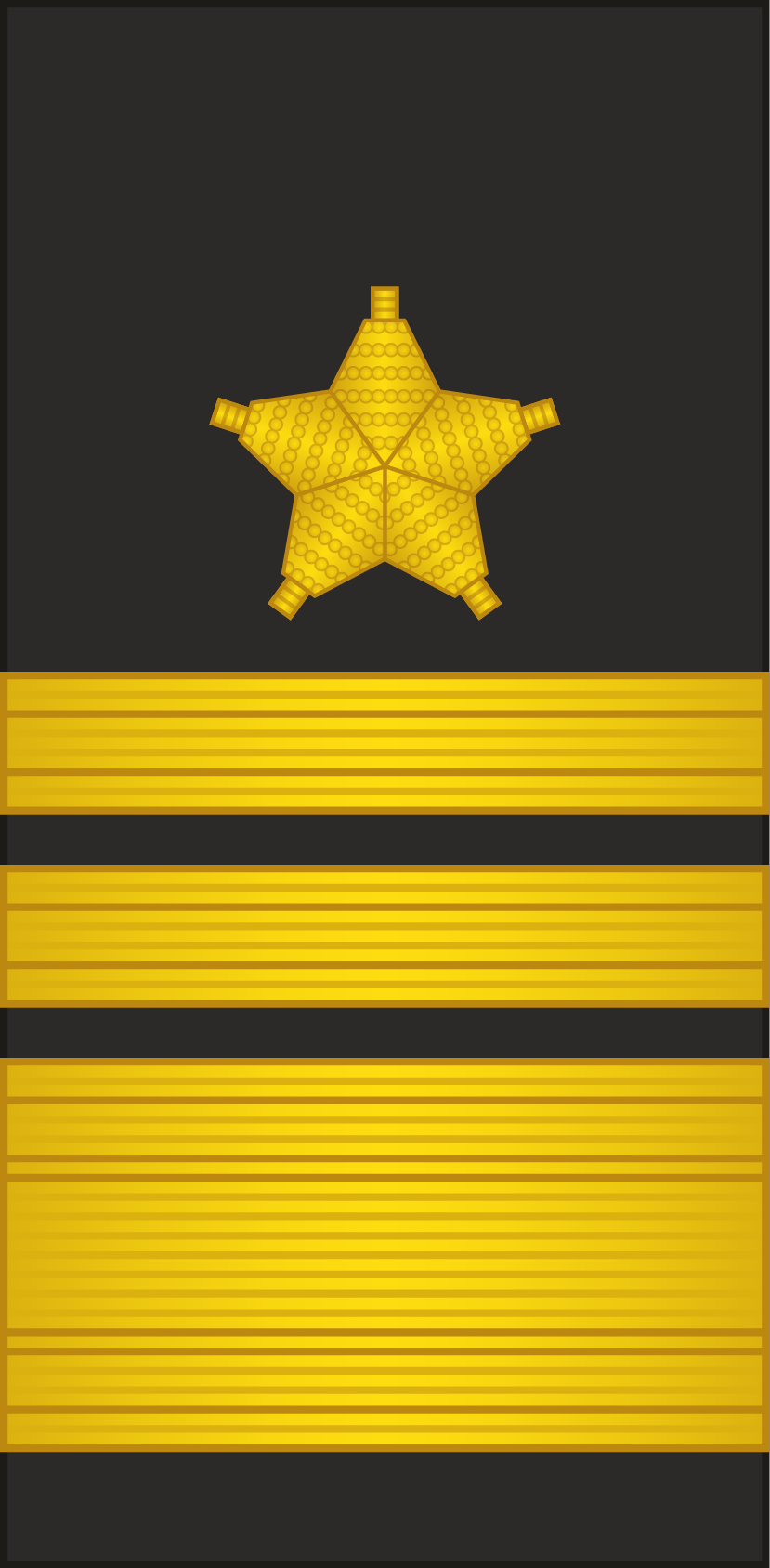
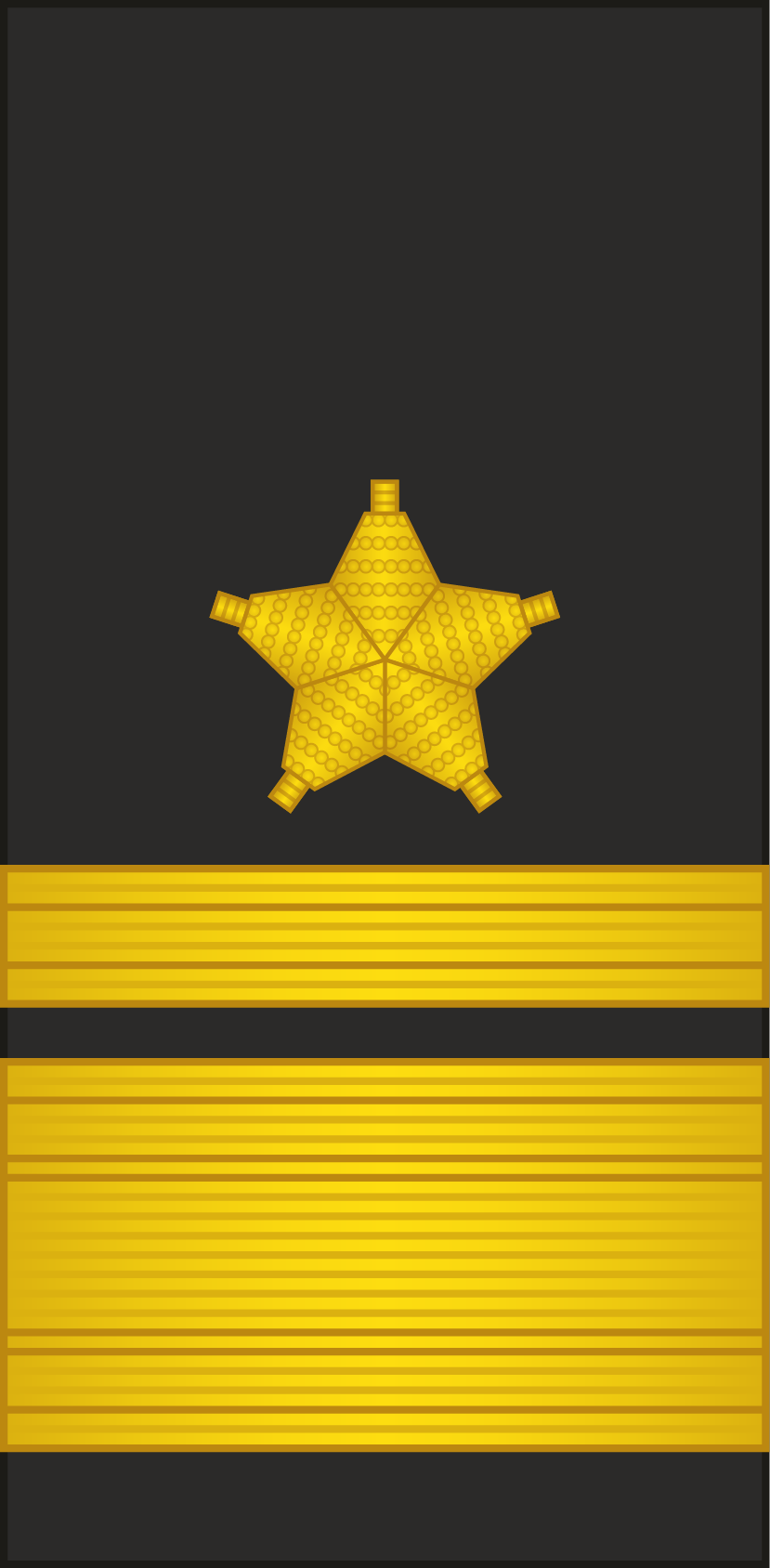
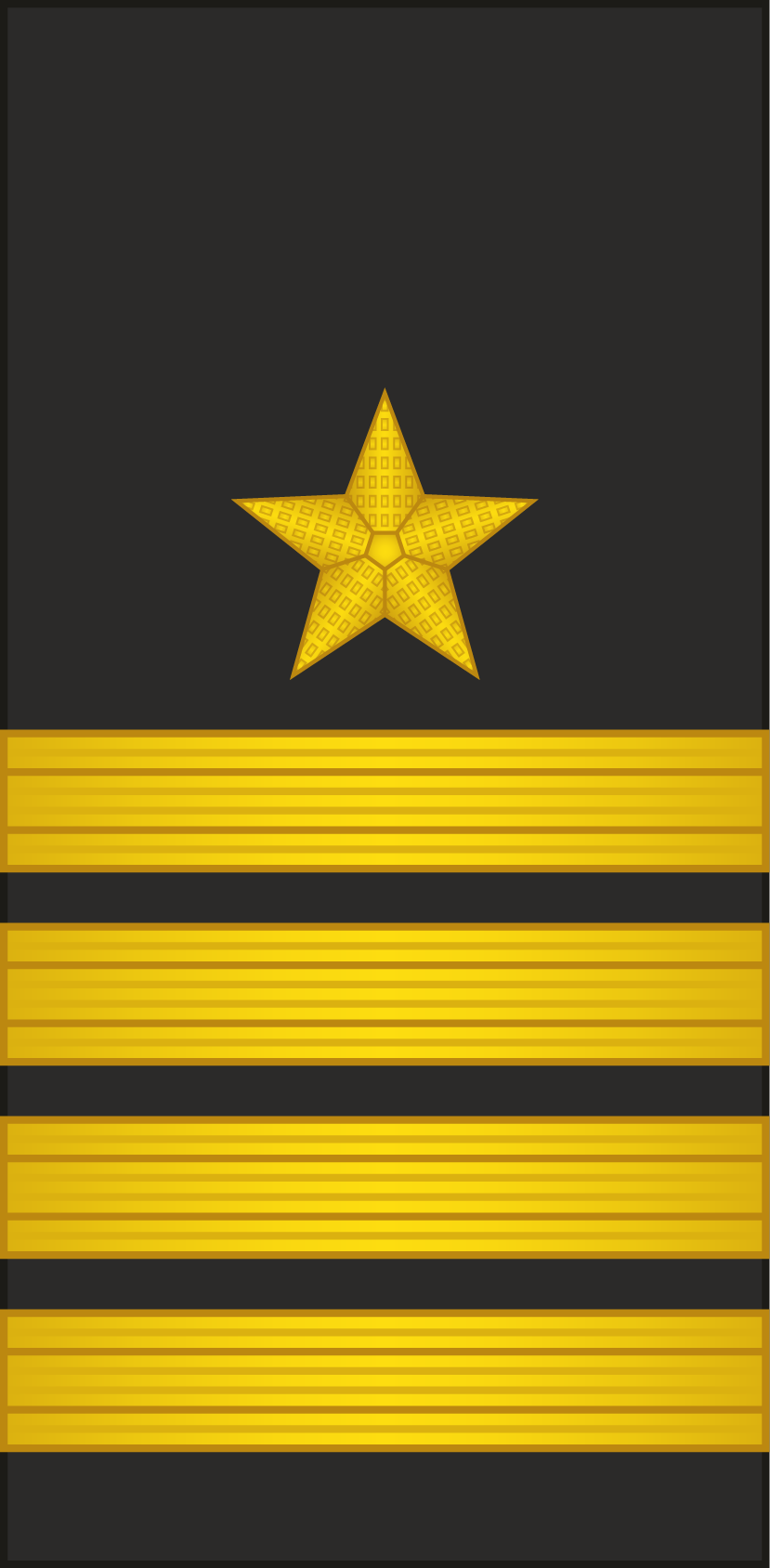
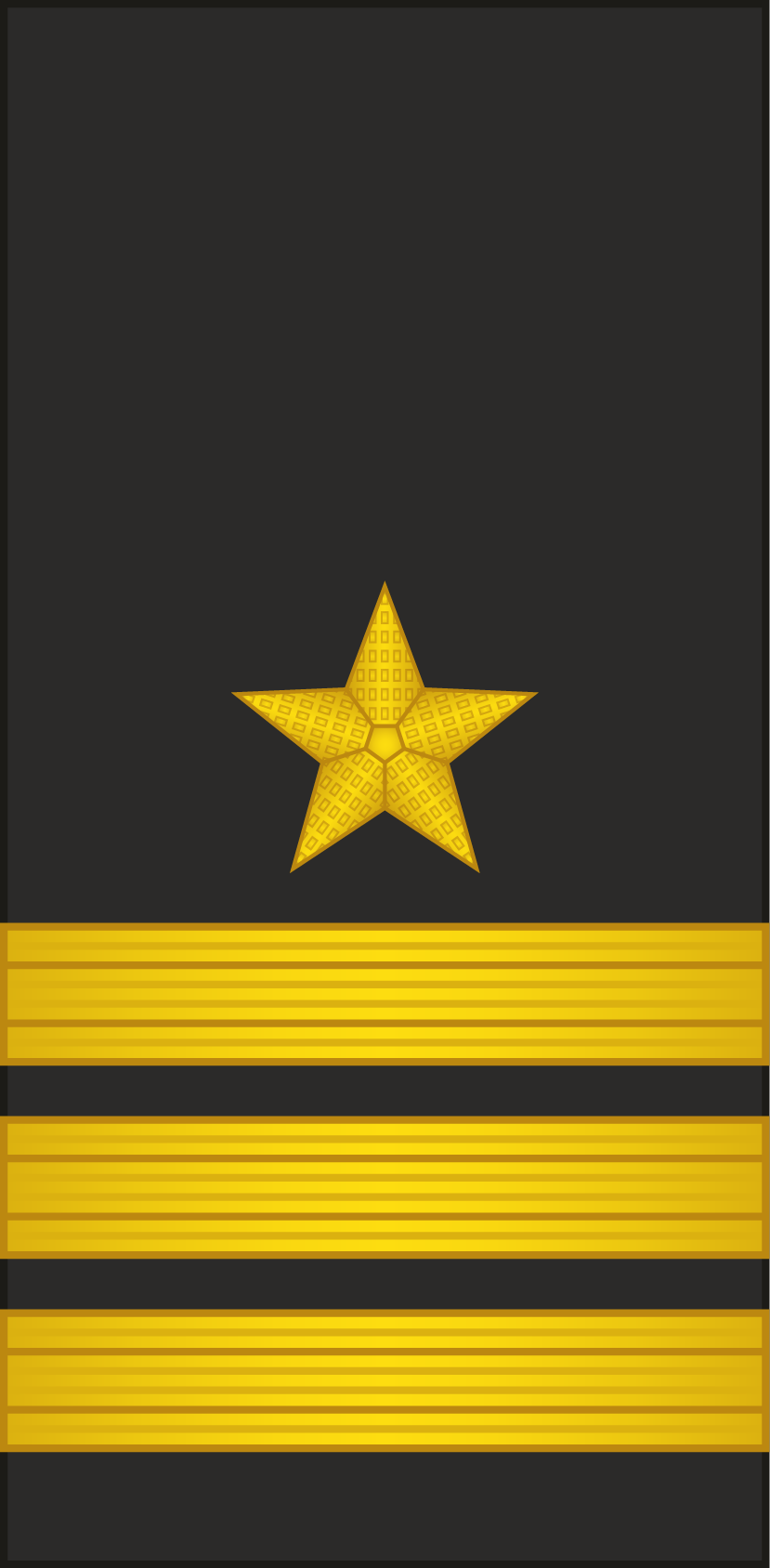
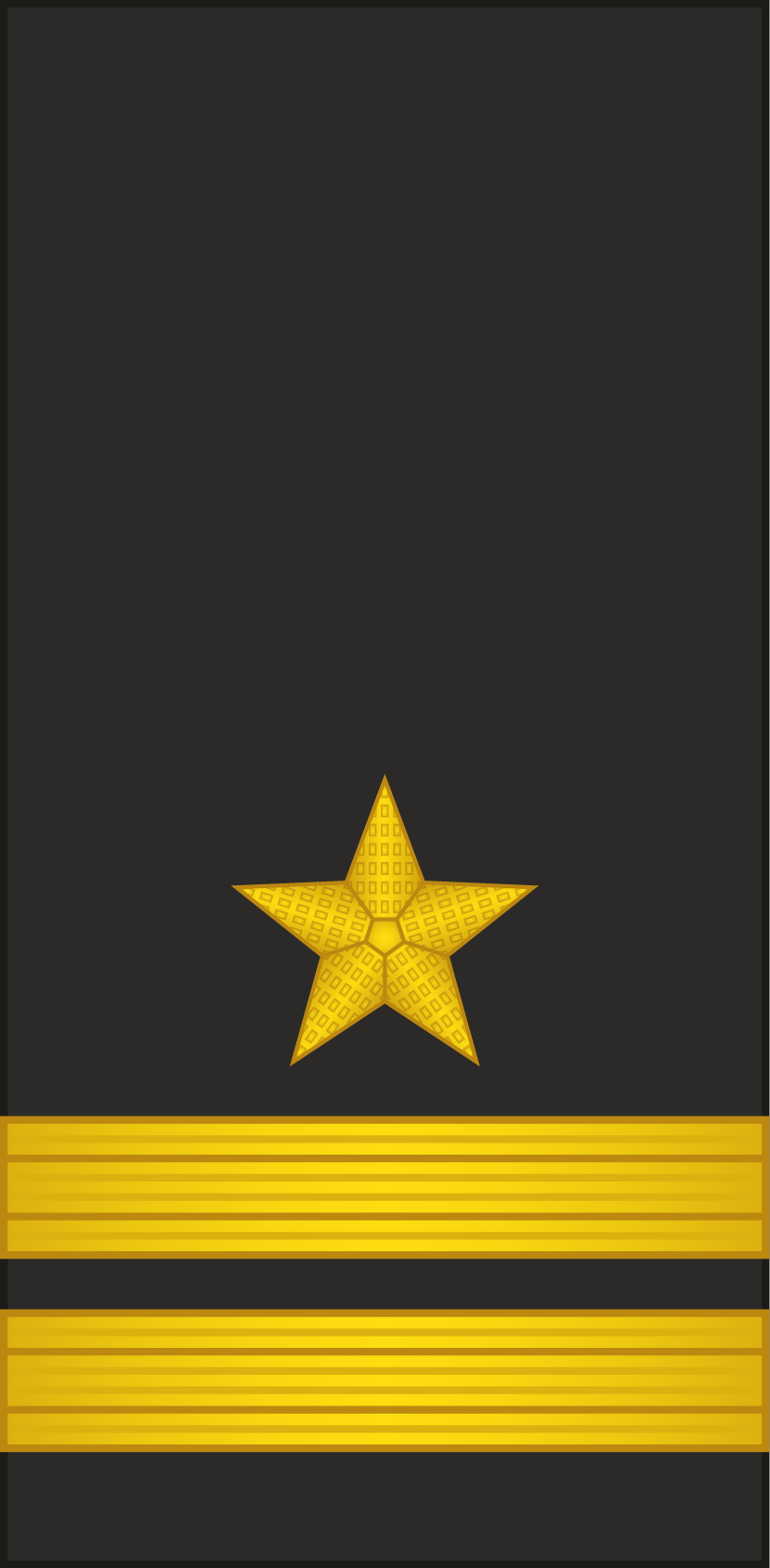
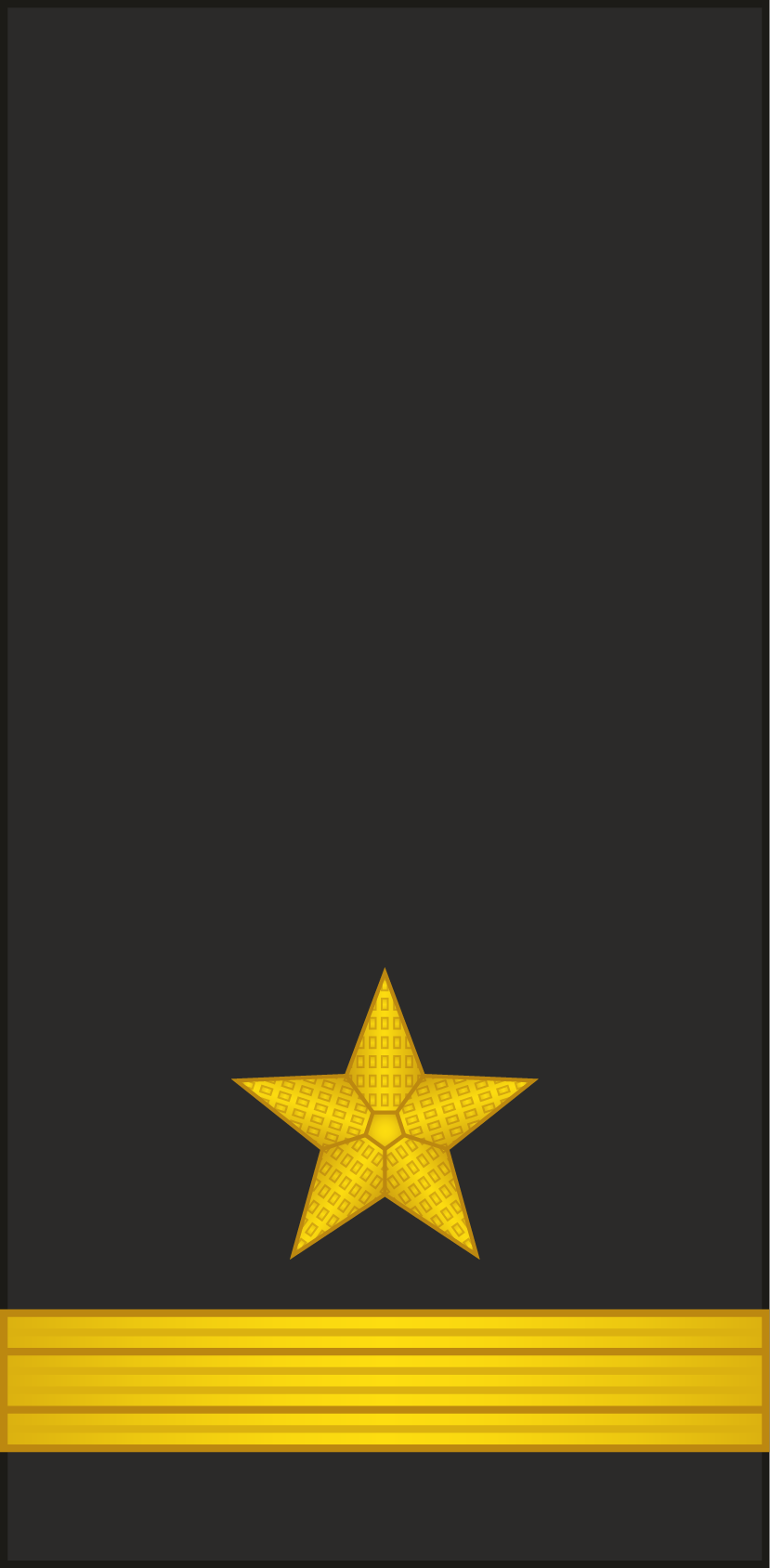
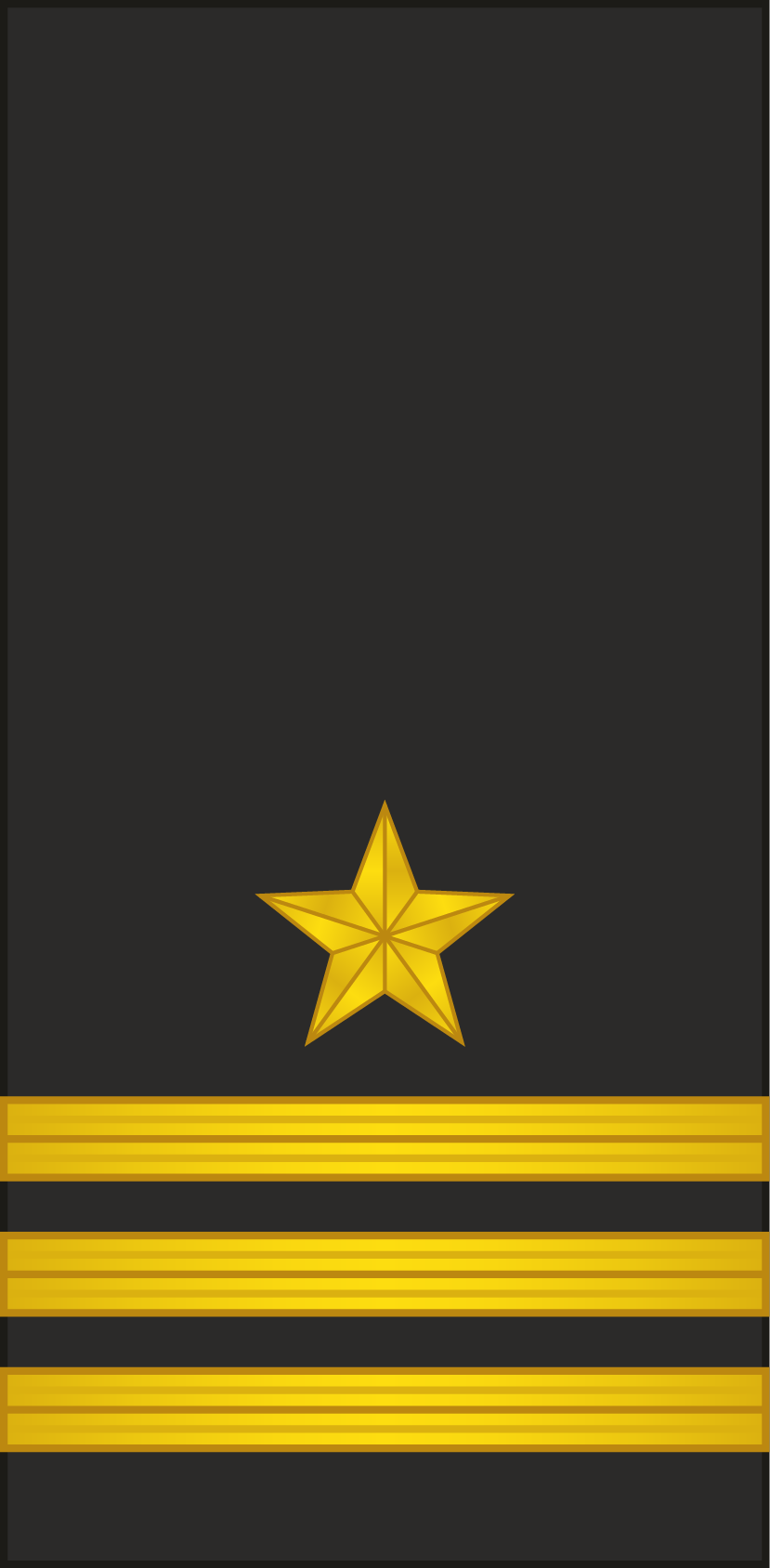
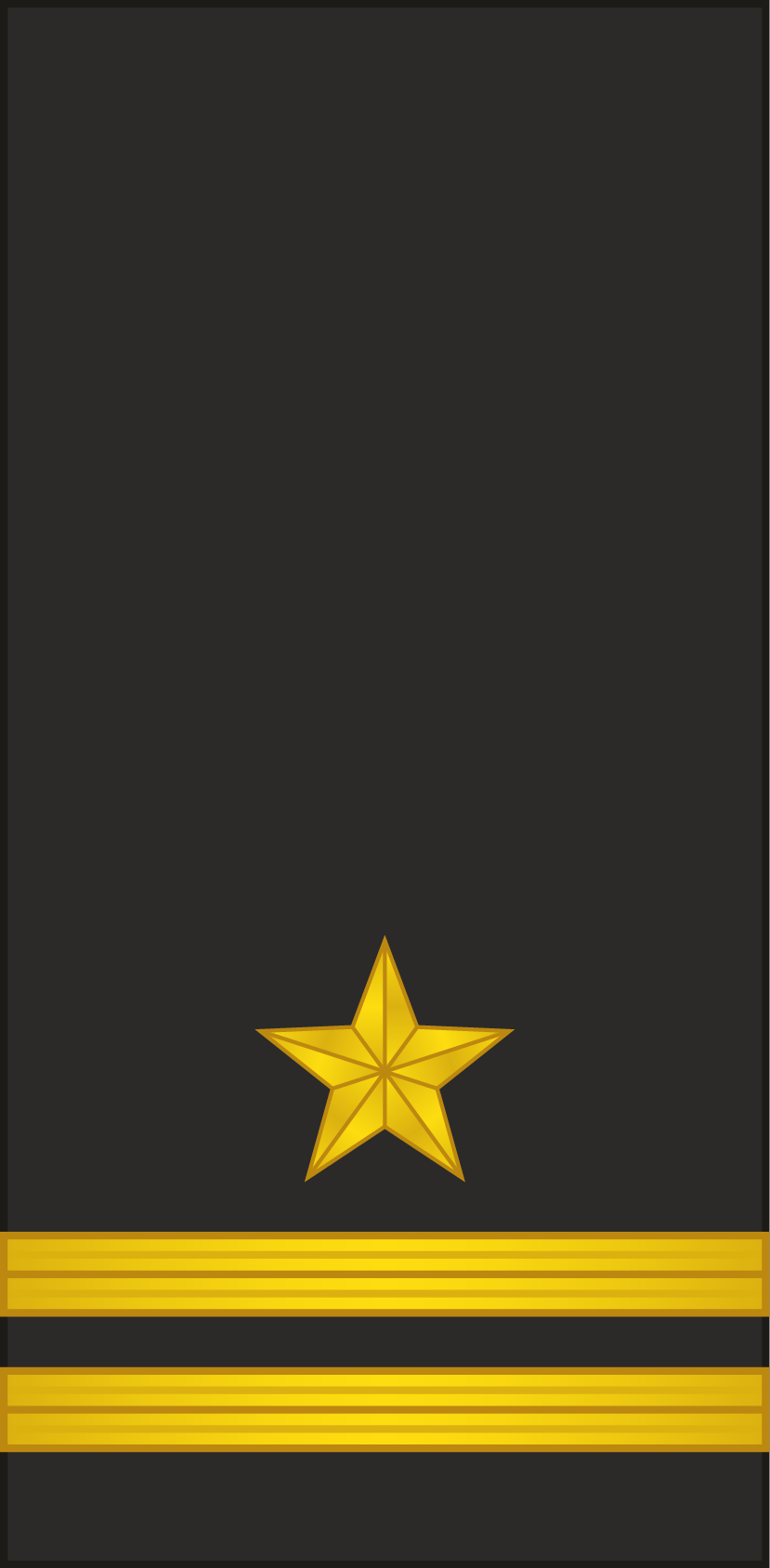
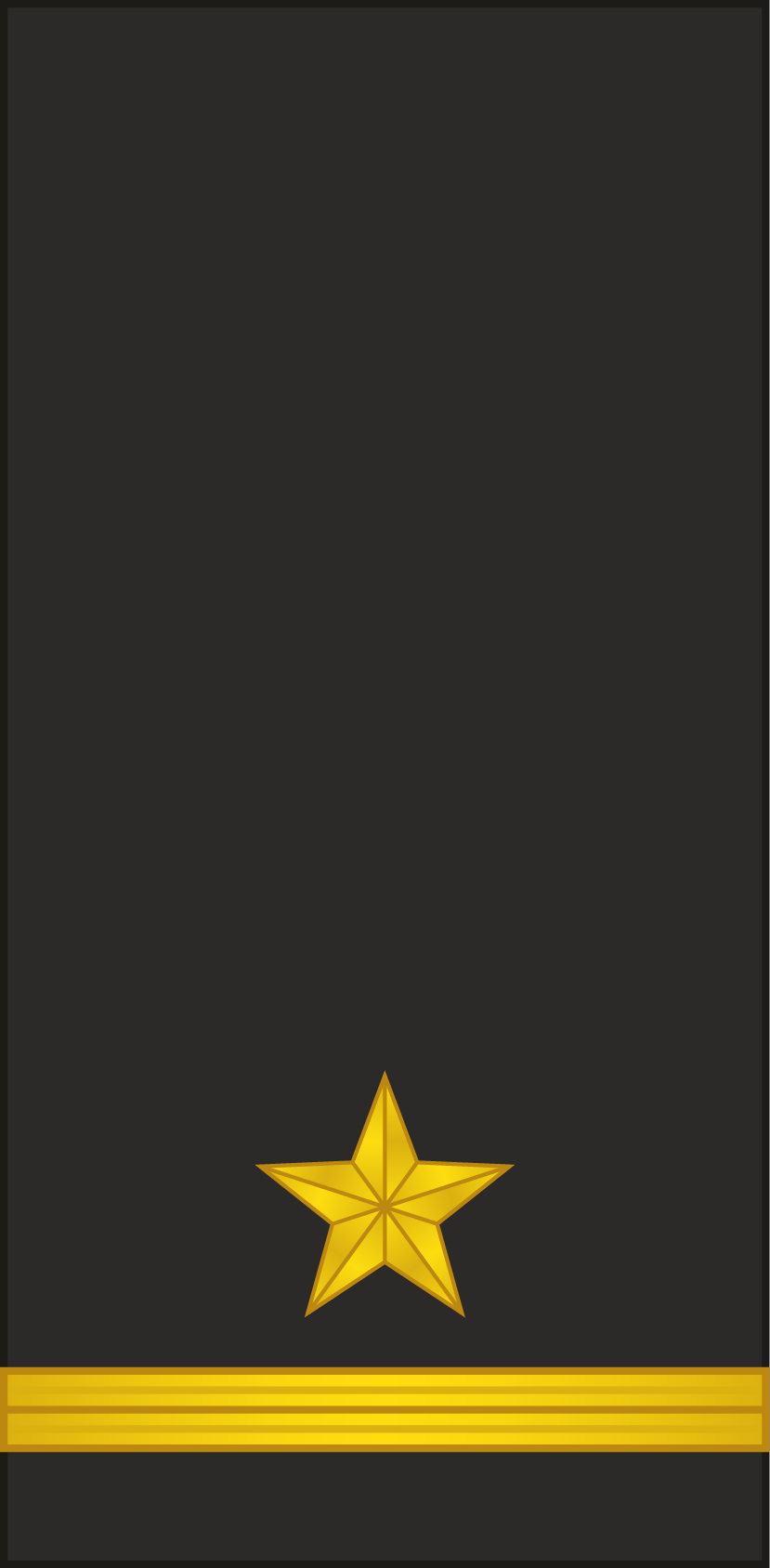
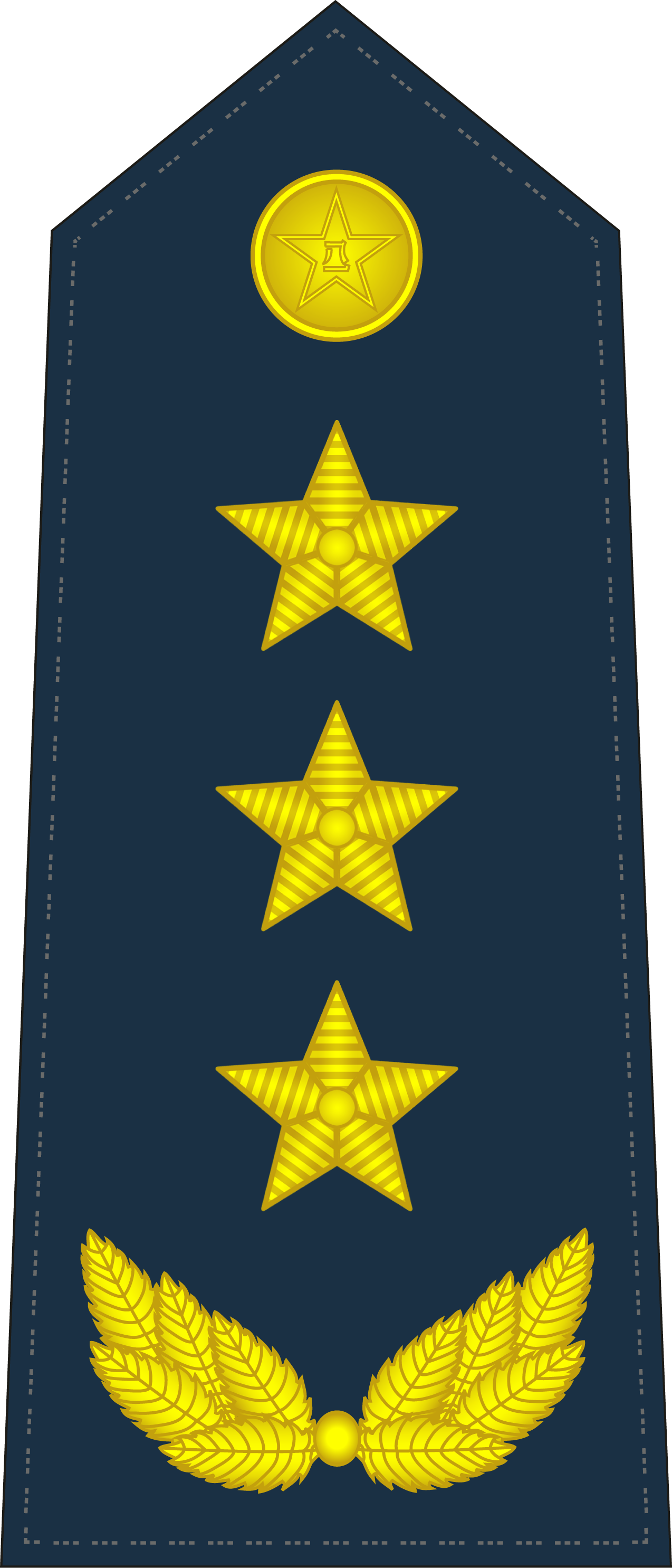
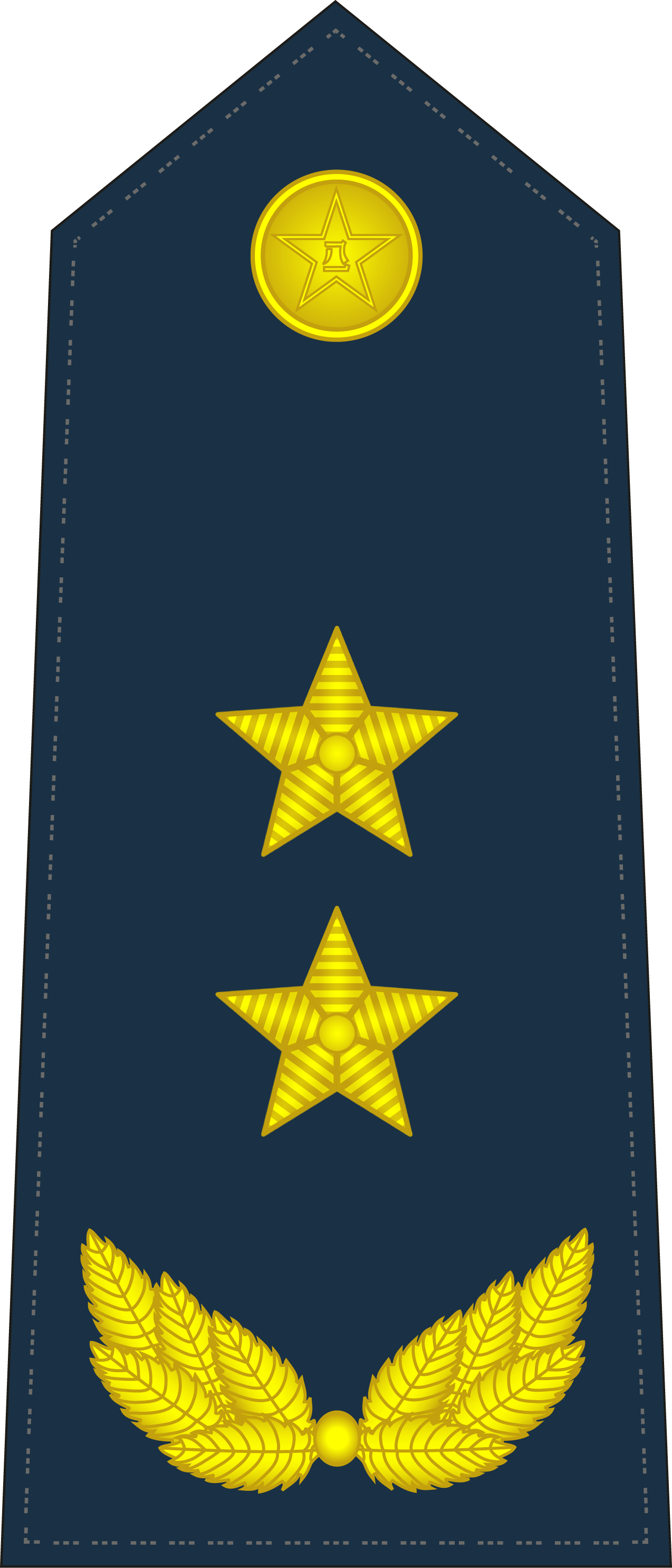
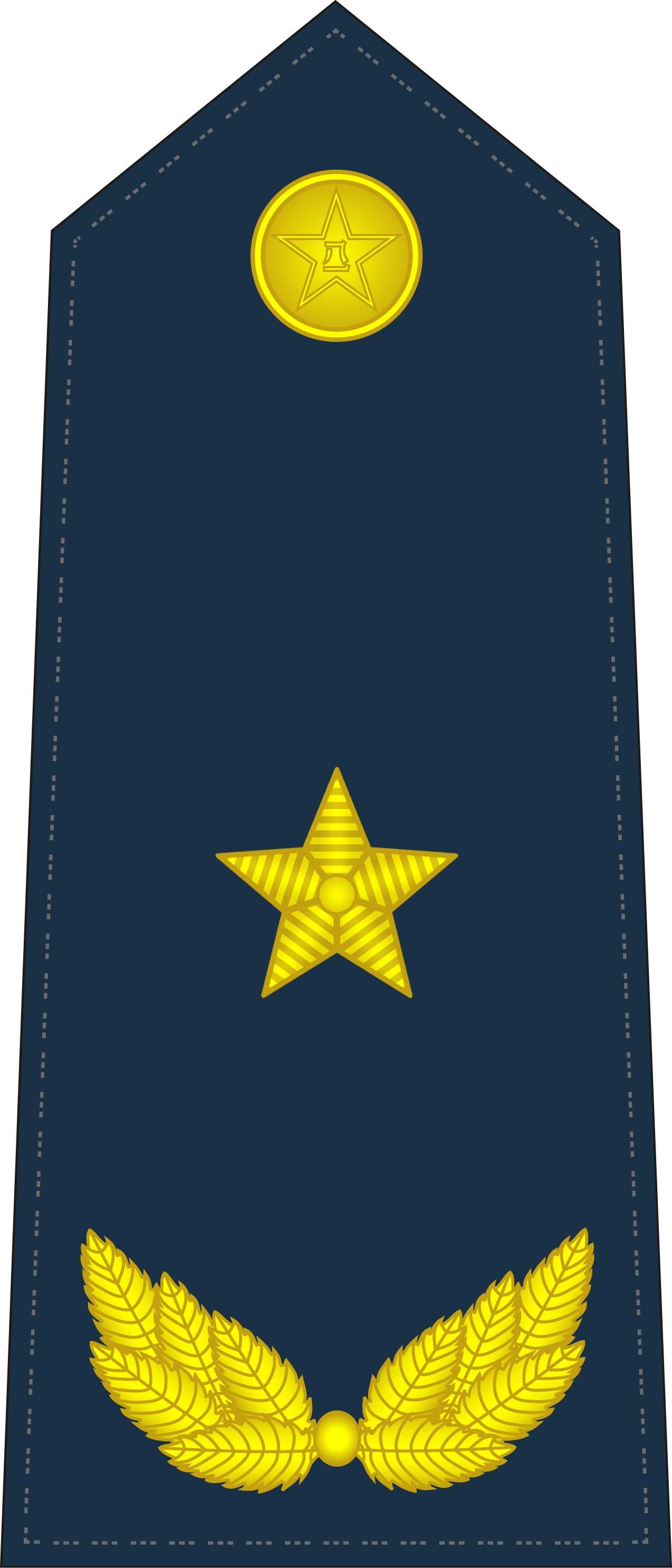
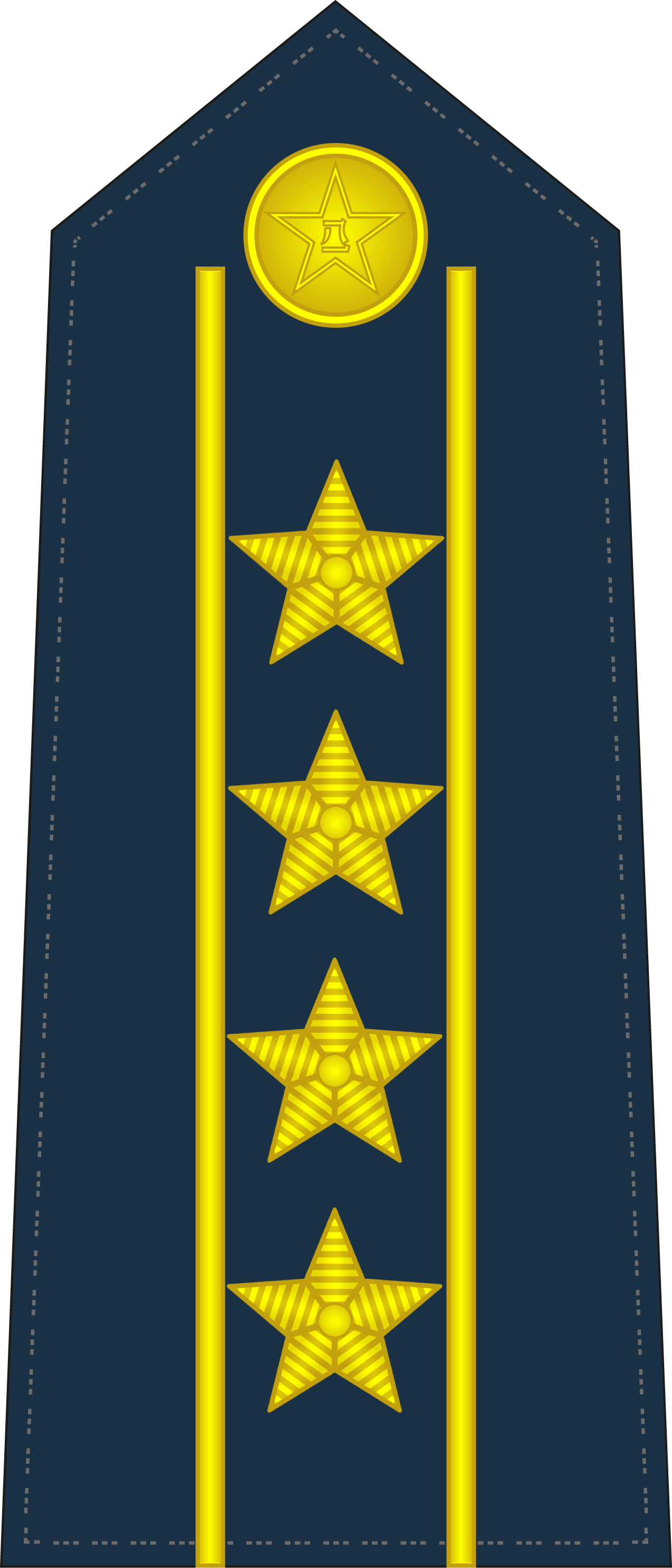
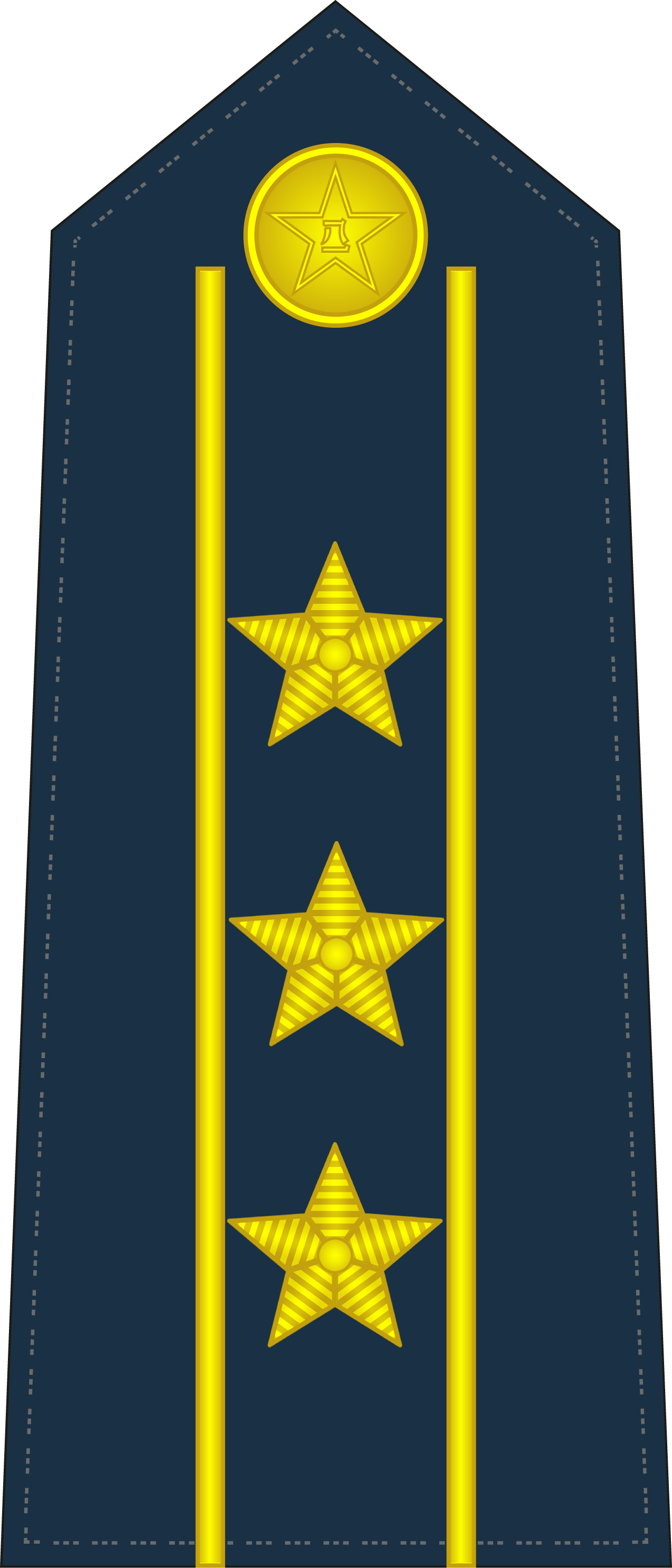
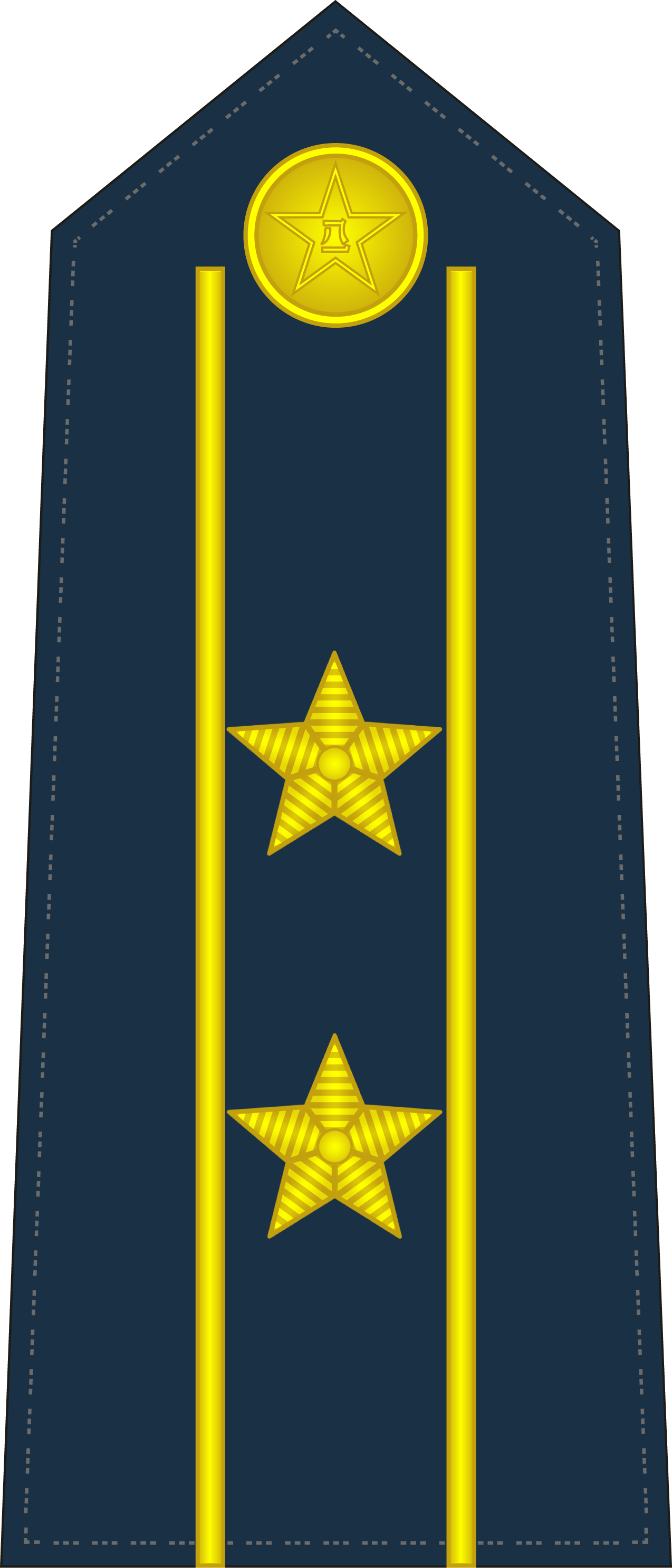
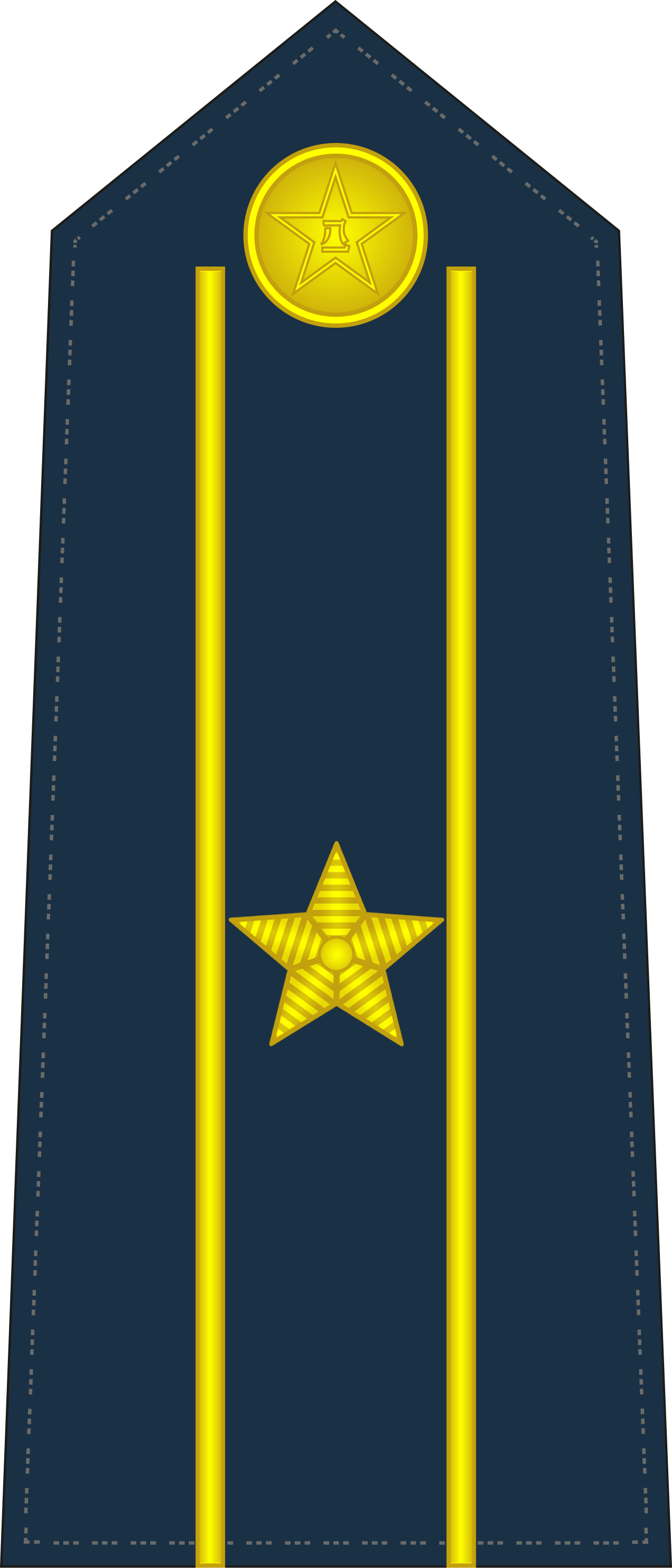
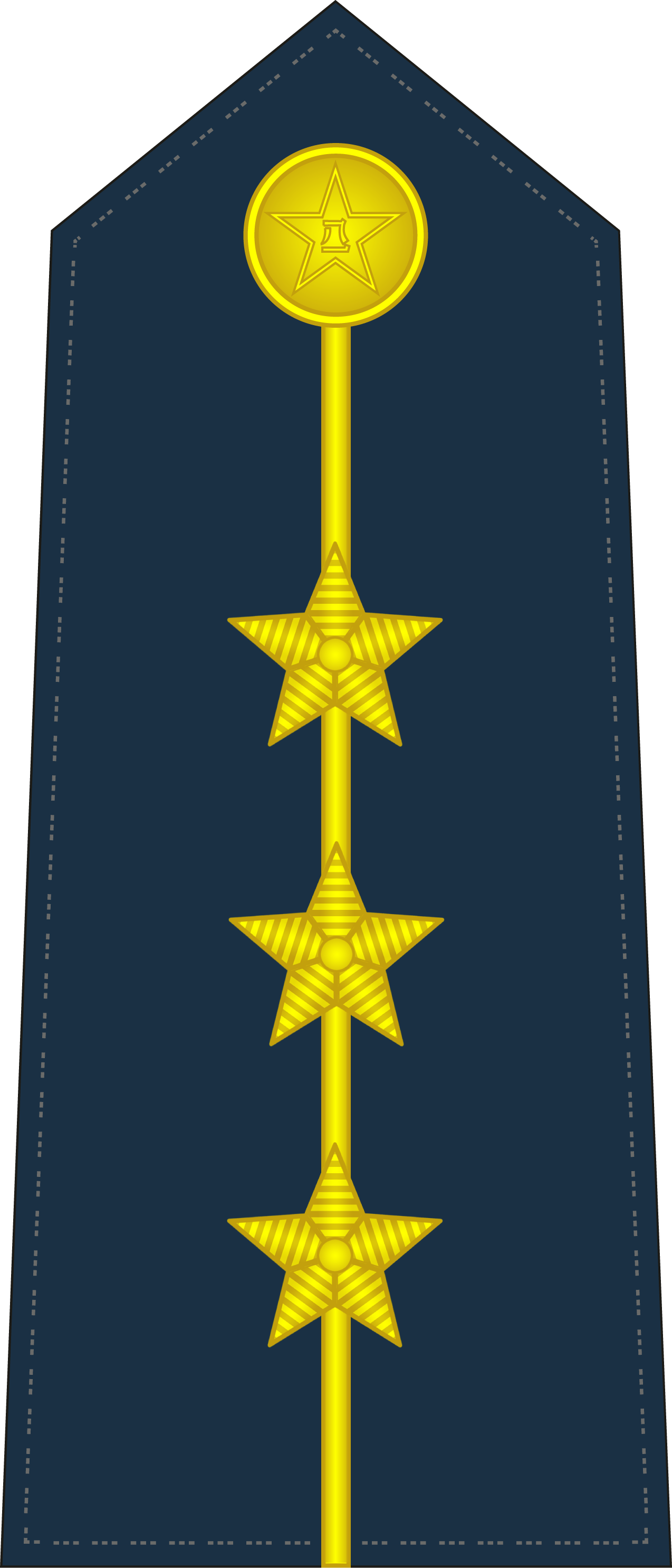
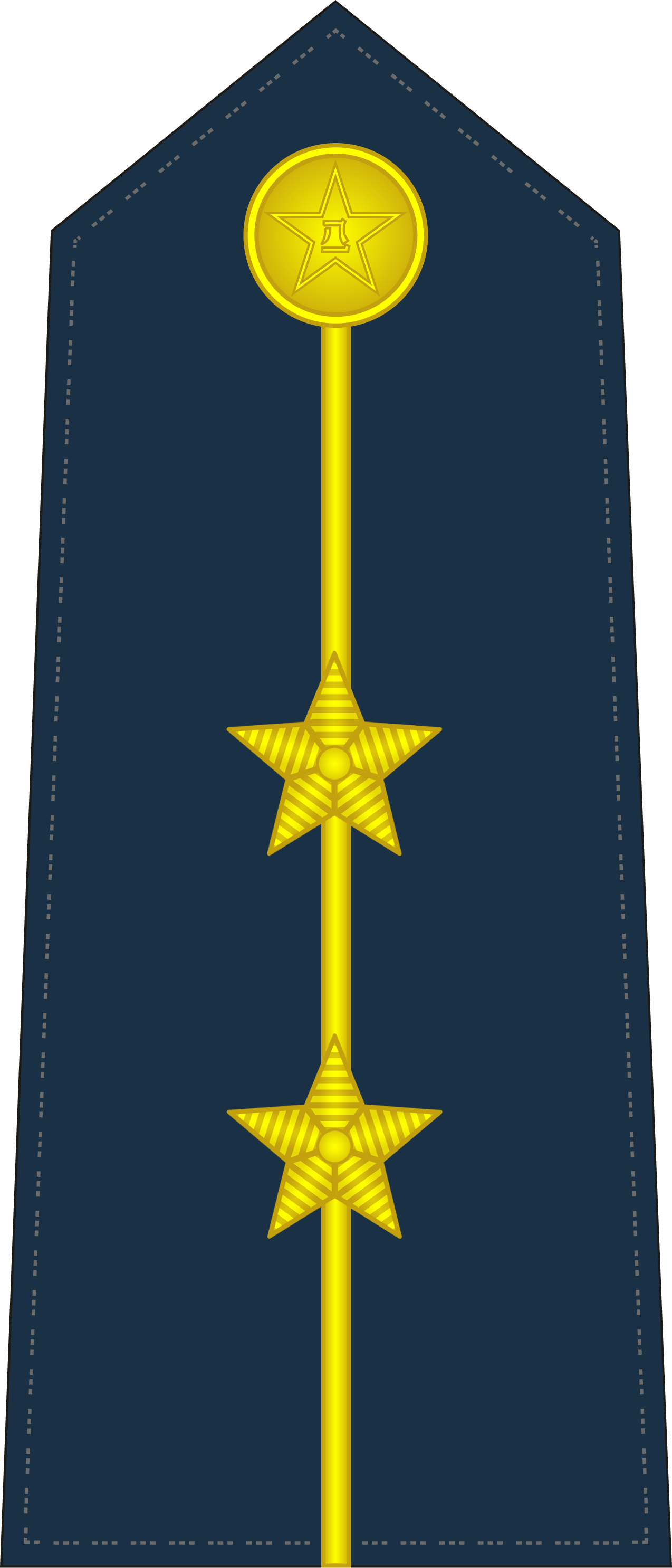
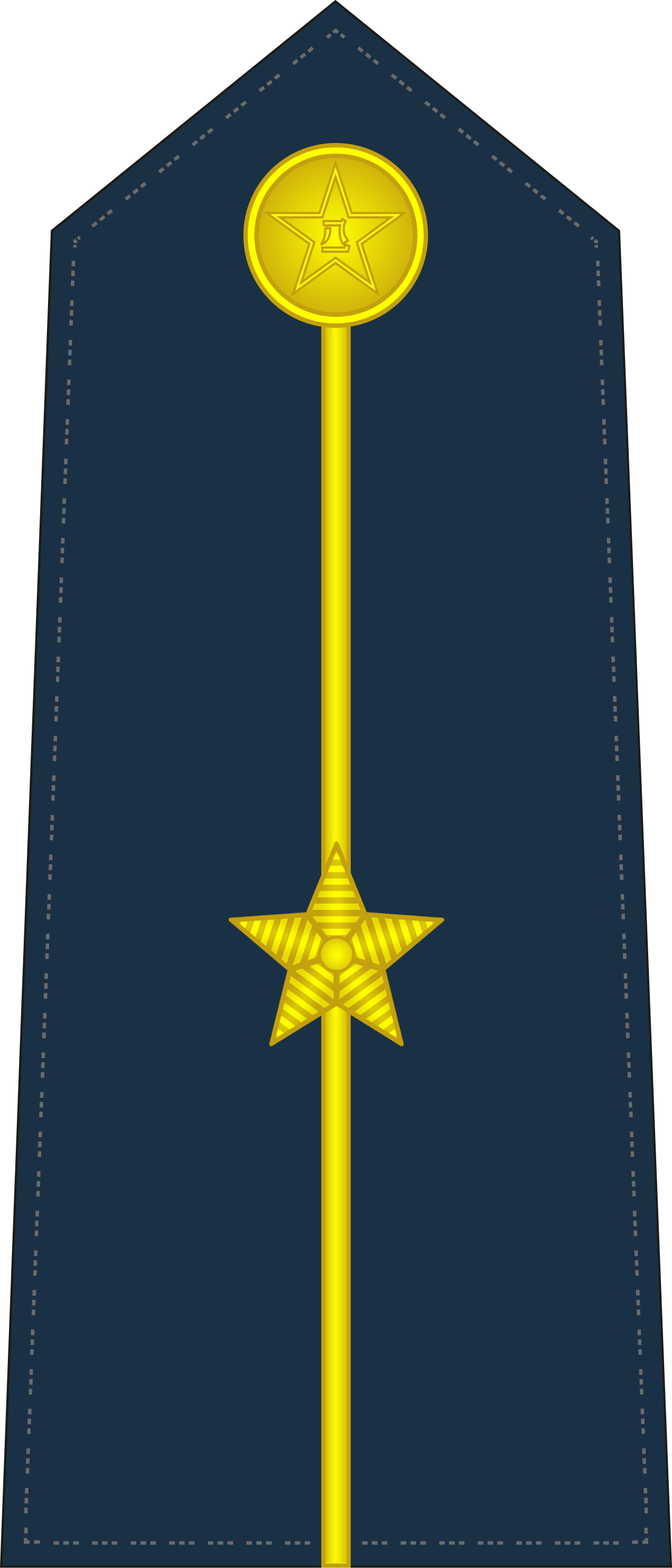
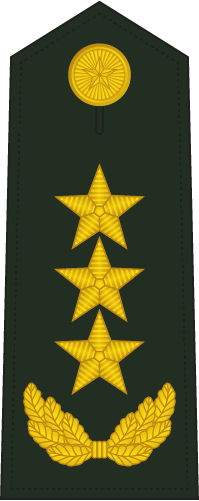
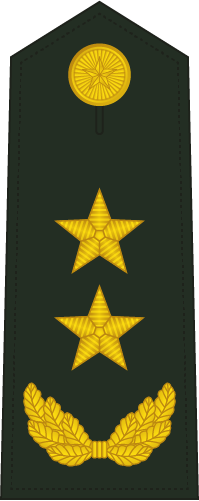
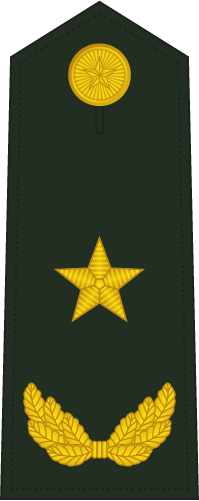
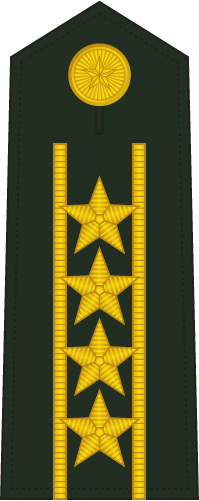
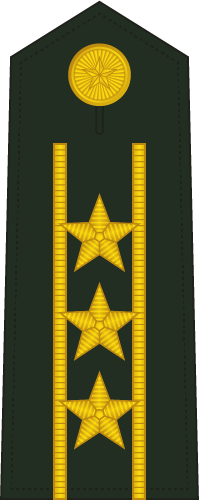
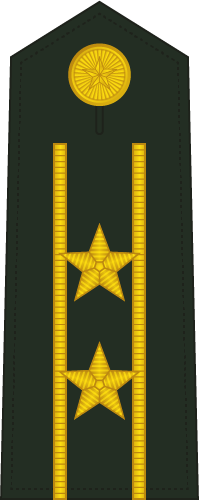
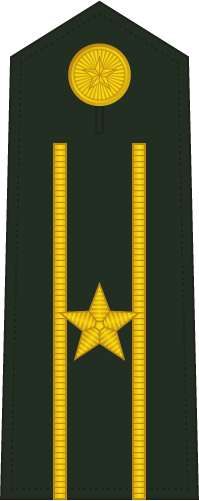
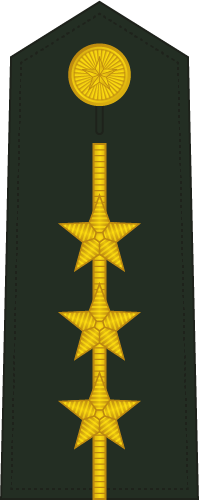
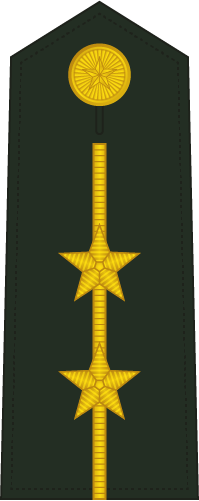
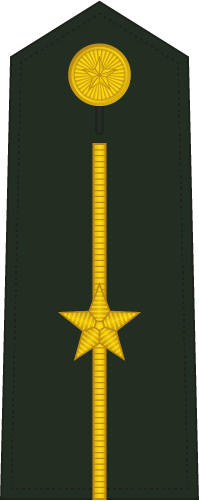
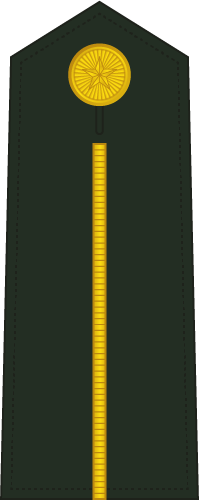
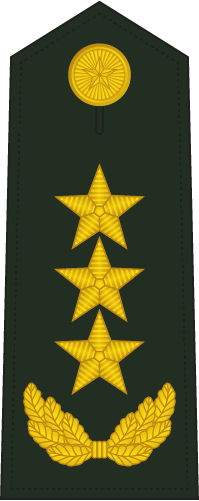
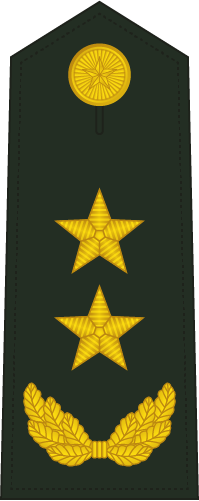
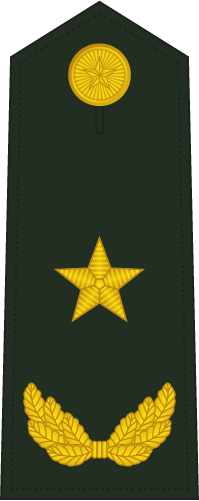
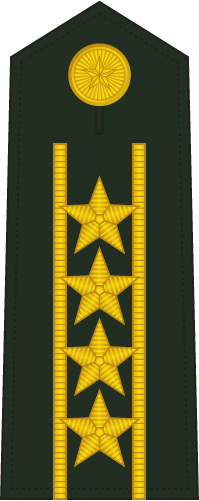
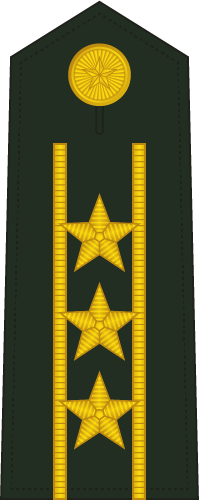
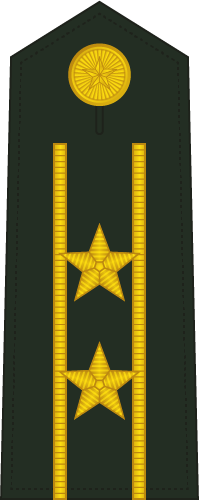
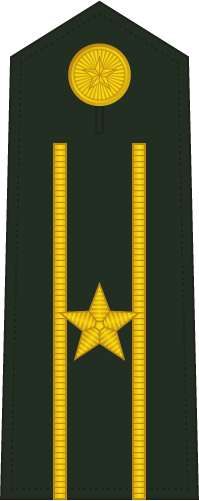
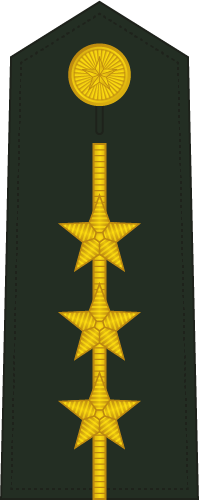
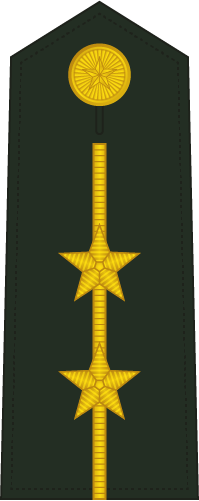
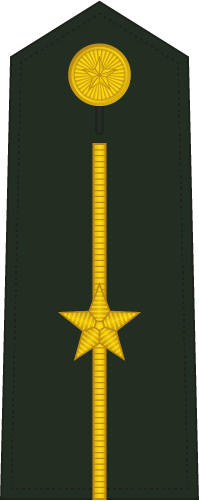
Rank group	General / flag officers			Senior officers				Junior officers
PLA Ground Force
PLA Ground Force	上将; Shàngjiāng	中将; Zhōngjiāng	少将; Shàojiāng	大校; Dàxiào	上校; Shàngxiào	中校; Zhōngxiào	少校; Shàoxiào	上尉; Shàngwèi	中尉; Zhōngwèi	少尉; Shàowèi
PLA Navy
PLA Navy	海军上将; Hǎijūn shàngjiàng	海军中将; Hǎijūn zhōngjiàng	海军少将; Hǎijūn shàojiàng	海军大校; Hǎijūn dàxiào	海军上校; Hǎijūn shàngxiào	海军中校; Hǎijūn zhōngxiào	海军少校; Hǎijūn shàoxiào	海军上尉; Hǎijūn shàngwèi	海军中尉; Hǎijūn zhōngwèi	海军少尉; Hǎijūn shàowèi
PLA Air Force
PLA Air Force	空军上将; Kōngjūn shàngjiàng	空军中将; Kōngjūn zhōngjiàng	空军少将; Kōngjūn shàojiàng	空军大校; Kōngjūn dàxiào	空军上校; Kōngjūn shàngxiào	空军中校; Kōngjūn zhōngxiào	空军少校; Kōngjūn shàoxiào	空军上尉; Kōngjūn shàngwèi	空军中尉; Kōngjūn zhōngwèi	空军少尉; Kōngjūn shàowèi
PLA Rocket Force	General	Lieutenant General	Major General	Colonel Commandant	Colonel	Lieutenant Colonel	Major	Captain	First Lieutenant	Second Lieutenant	Officer Cadet
PLA Rocket Force	上将; Shàngjiàng	中将; Zhōngjiàng	少将; Shàojiàng	大校; Dàxiào	上校; Shàngxiào	中校; Zhōngxiào	少校; Shàoxiào	上尉; Shàngwèi	中尉; Zhōngwèi	少尉; Shàowèi	学员; Xuéyuán
(China) PLA Strategic Support Force
(China) PLA Strategic Support Force	上将; Shàngjiàng	中将; Zhōngjiàng	少将; Shàojiàng	大校; Dàxiào	上校; Shàngxiào	中校; Zhōngxiào	少校; Shàoxiào	上尉; Shàngwèi	中尉; Zhōngwèi	少尉; Shàowèi

==== Other ranks ====
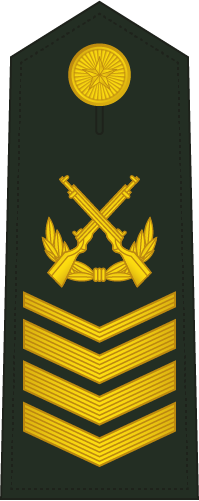
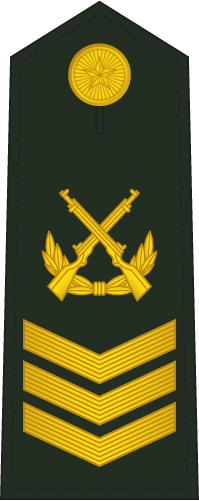
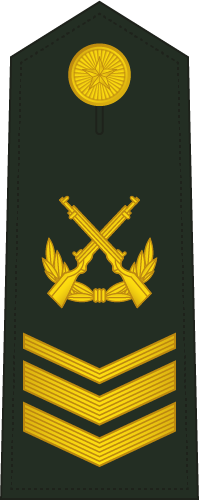
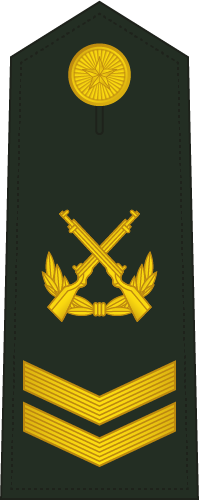
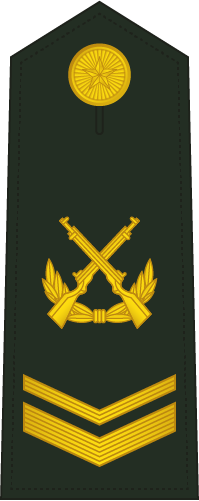
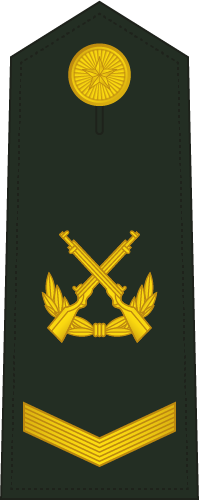
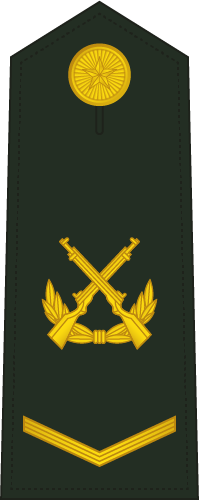
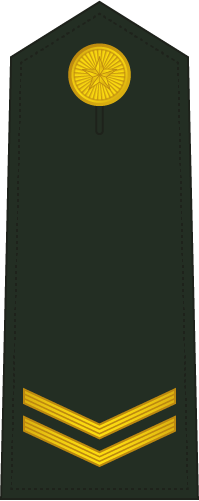
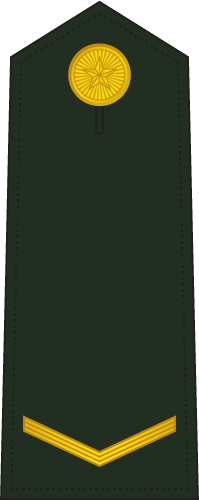
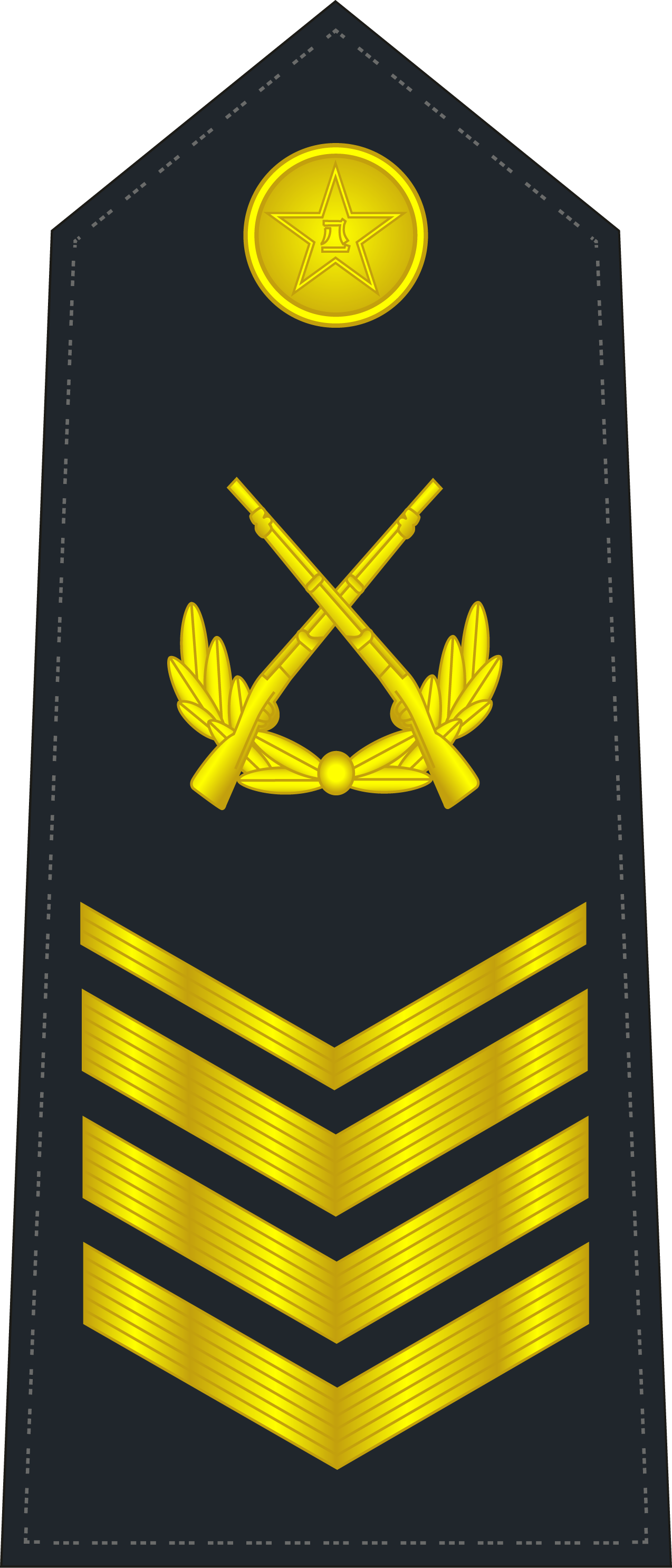
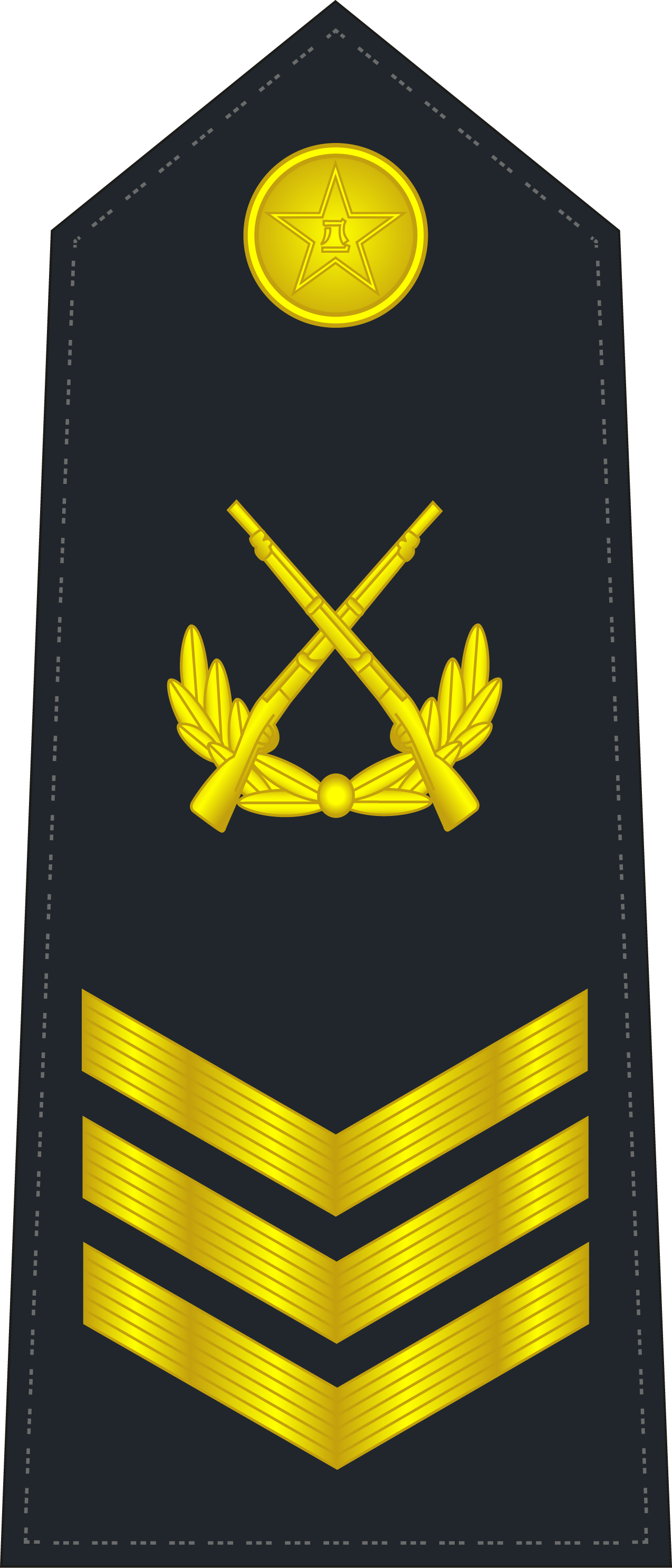
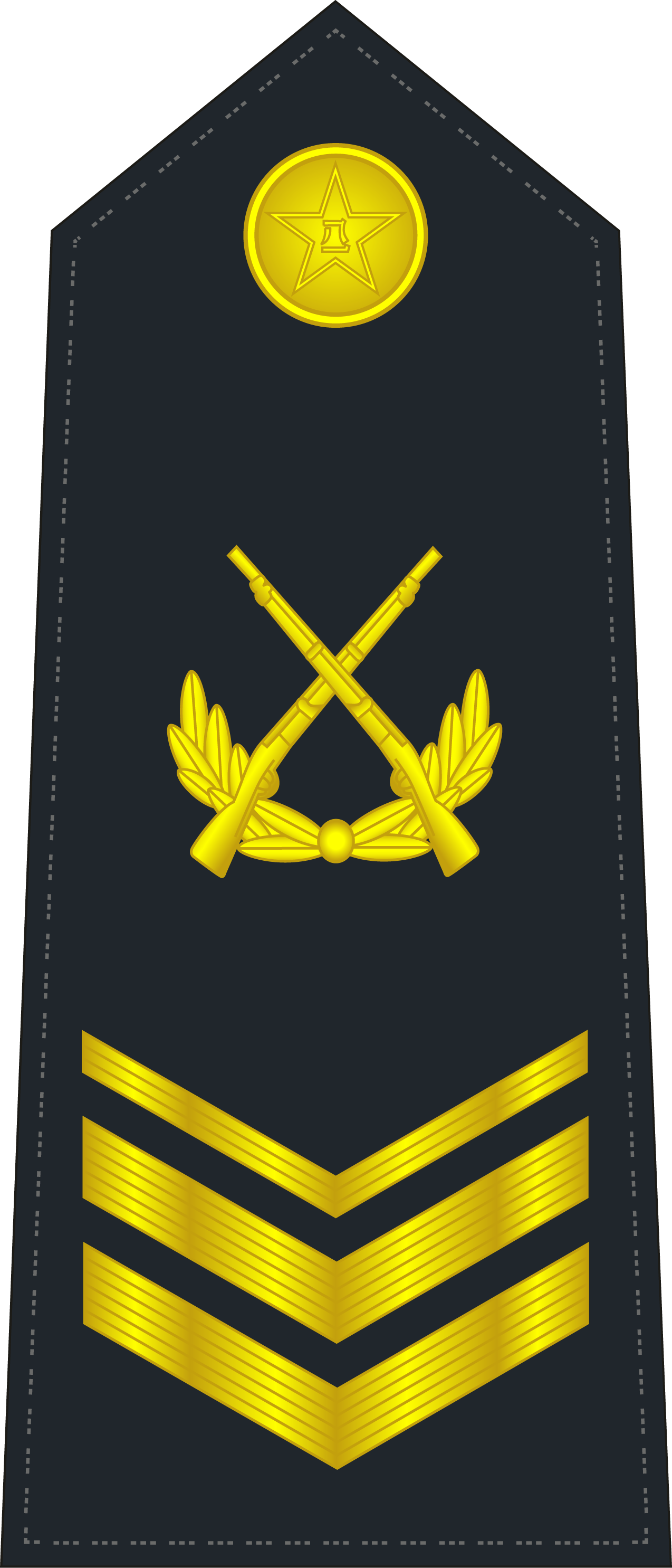
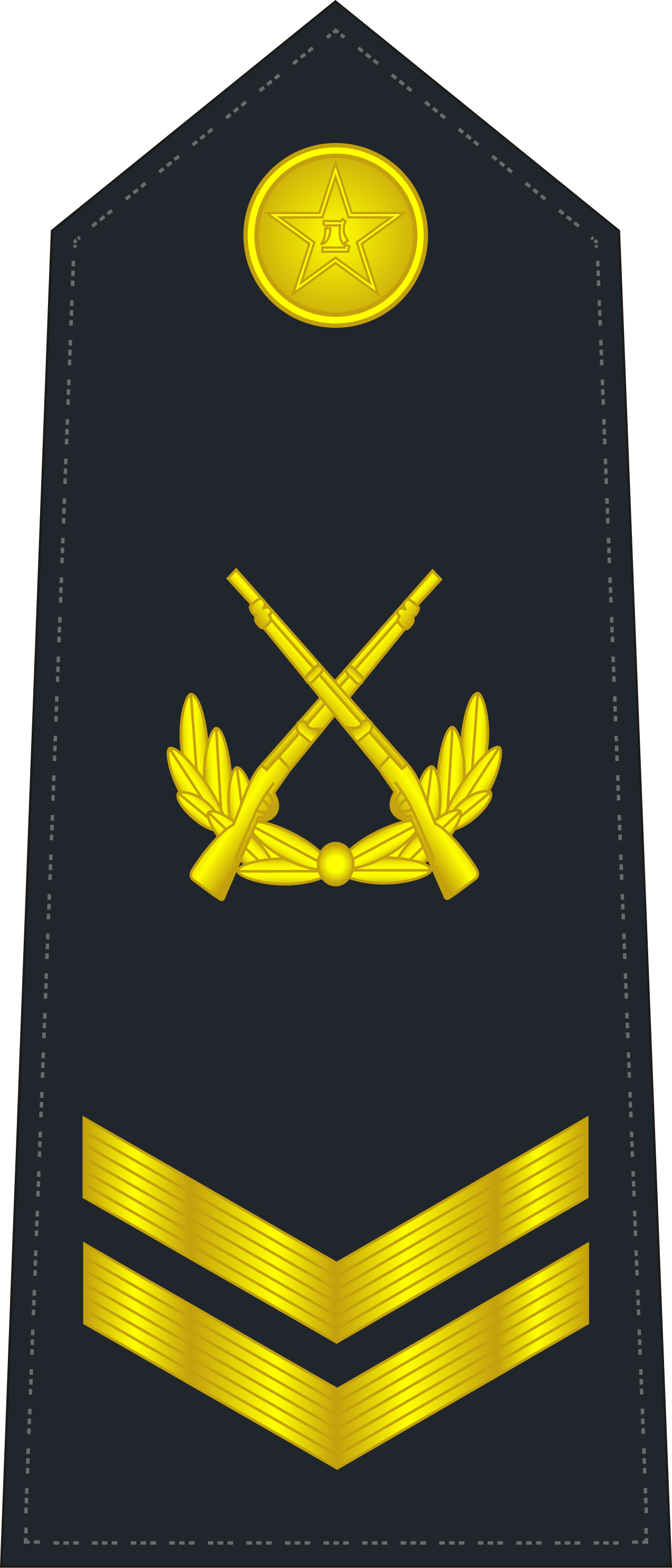
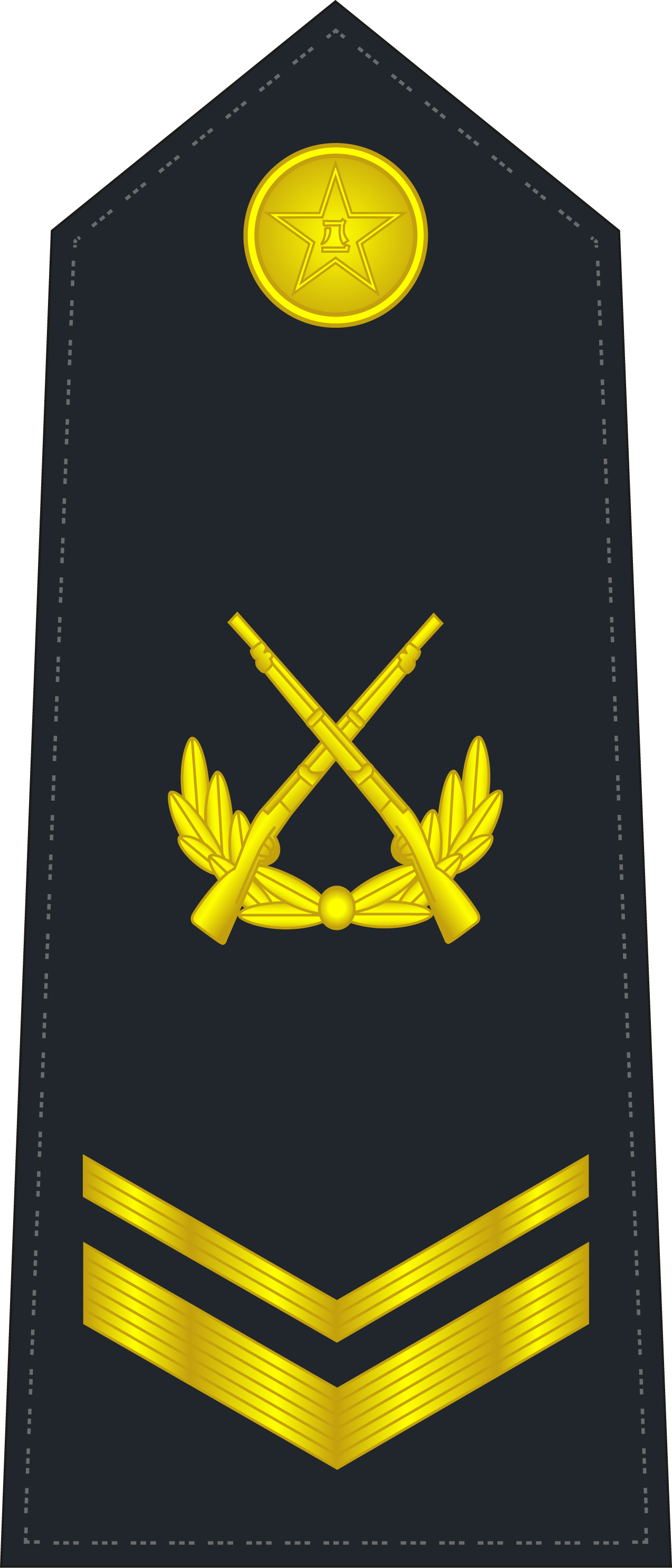
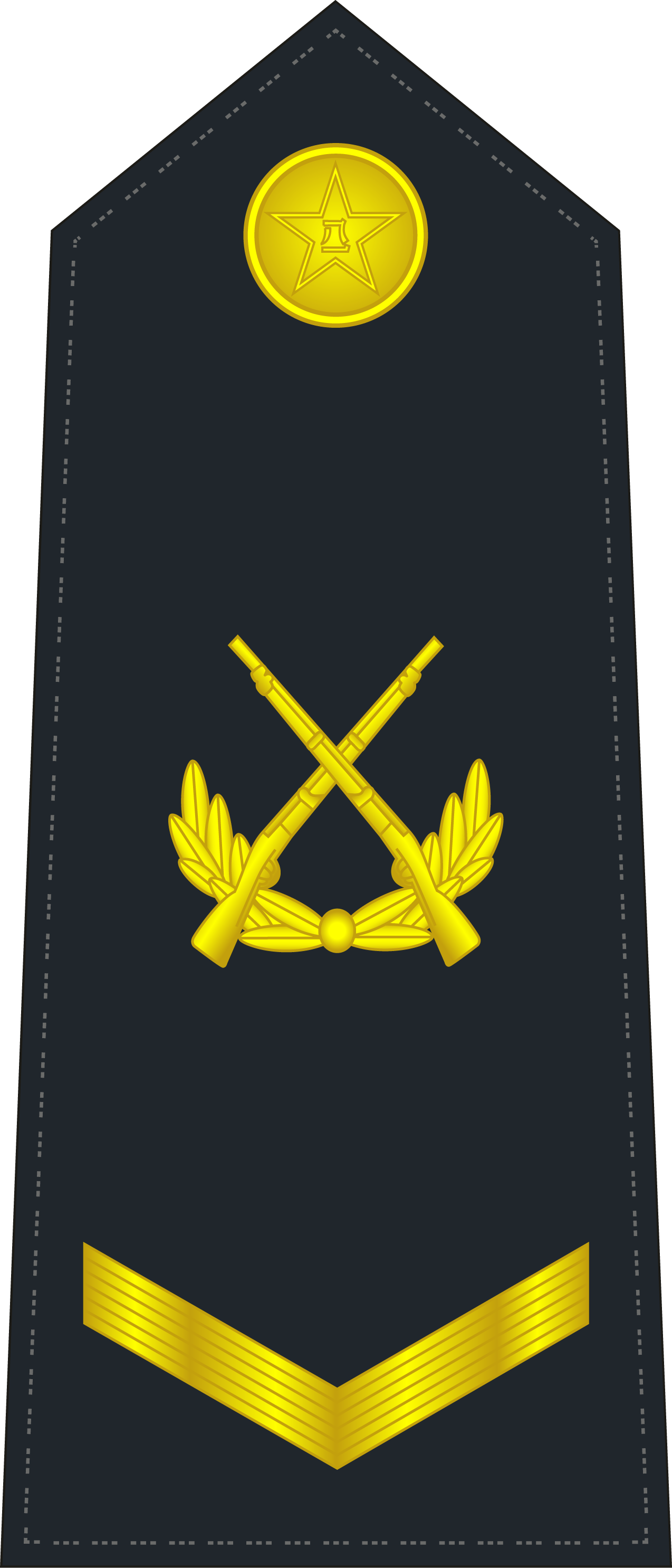
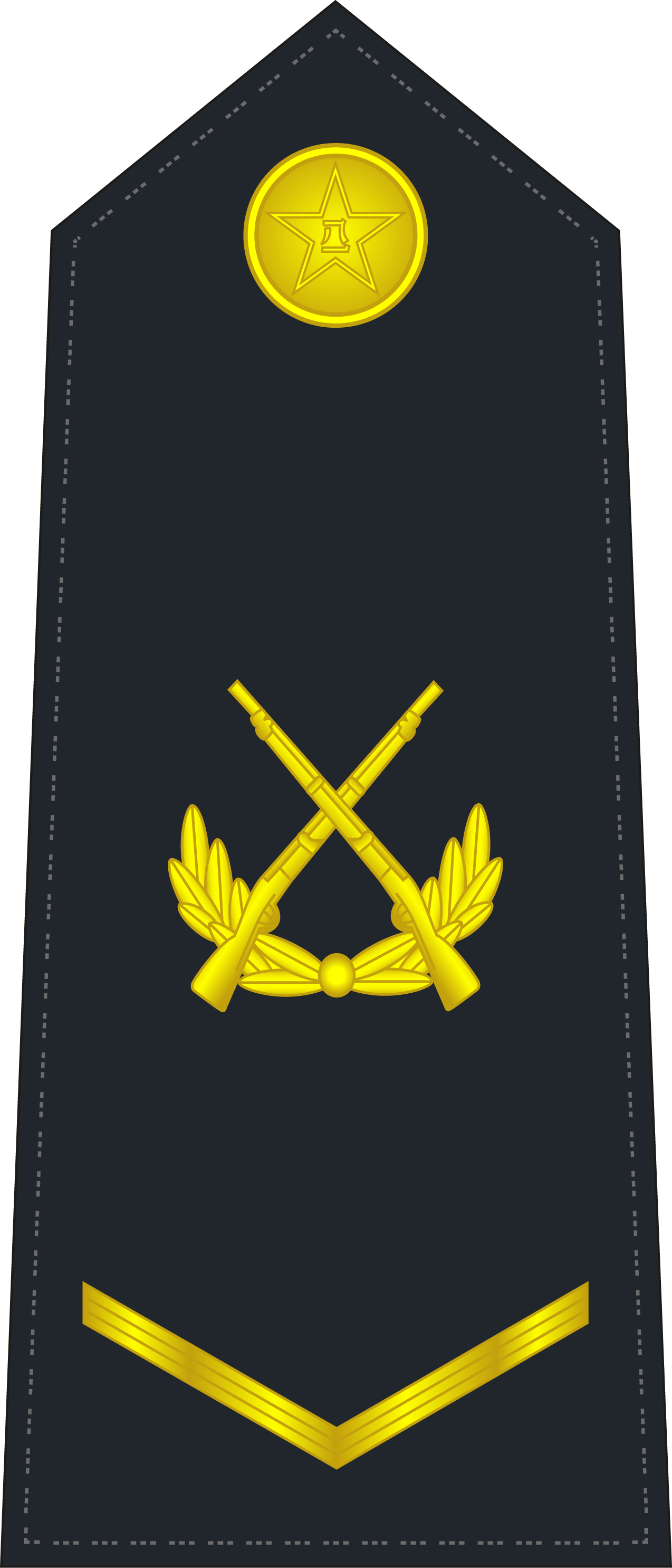
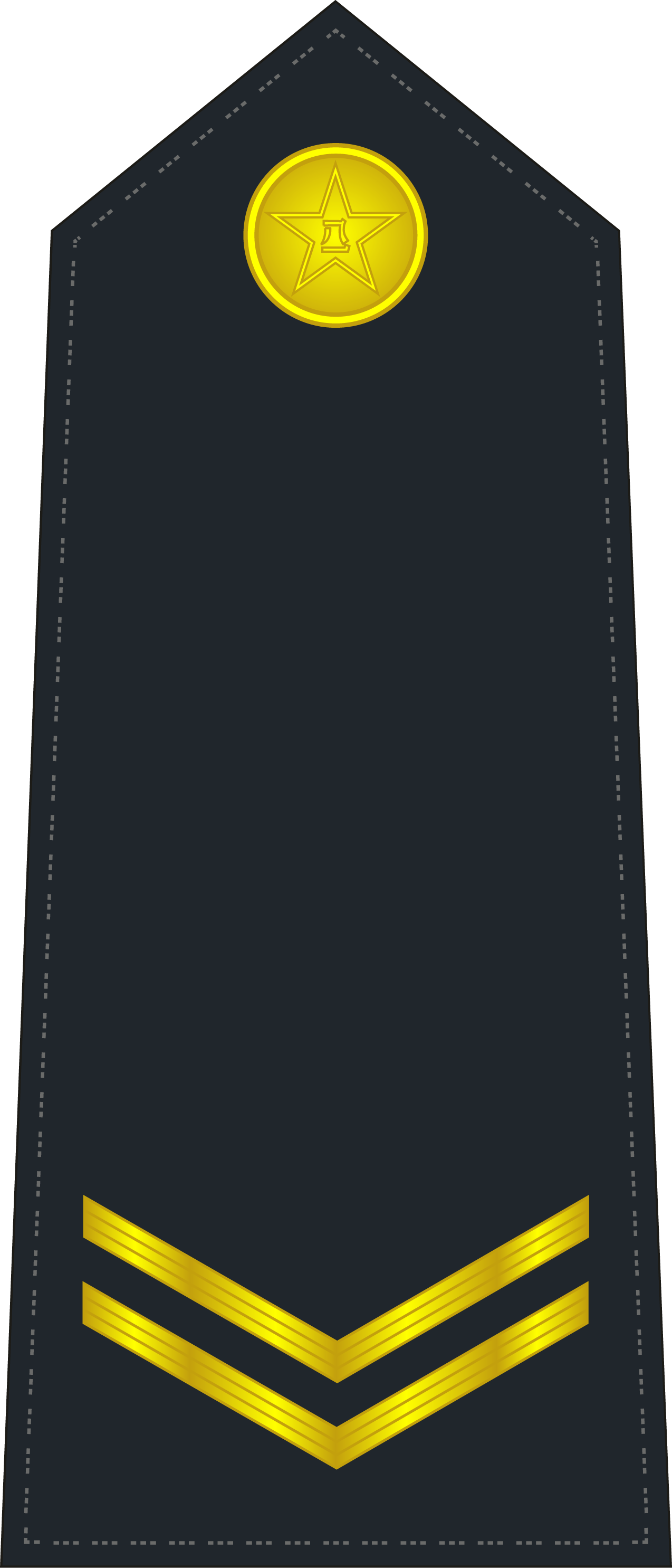
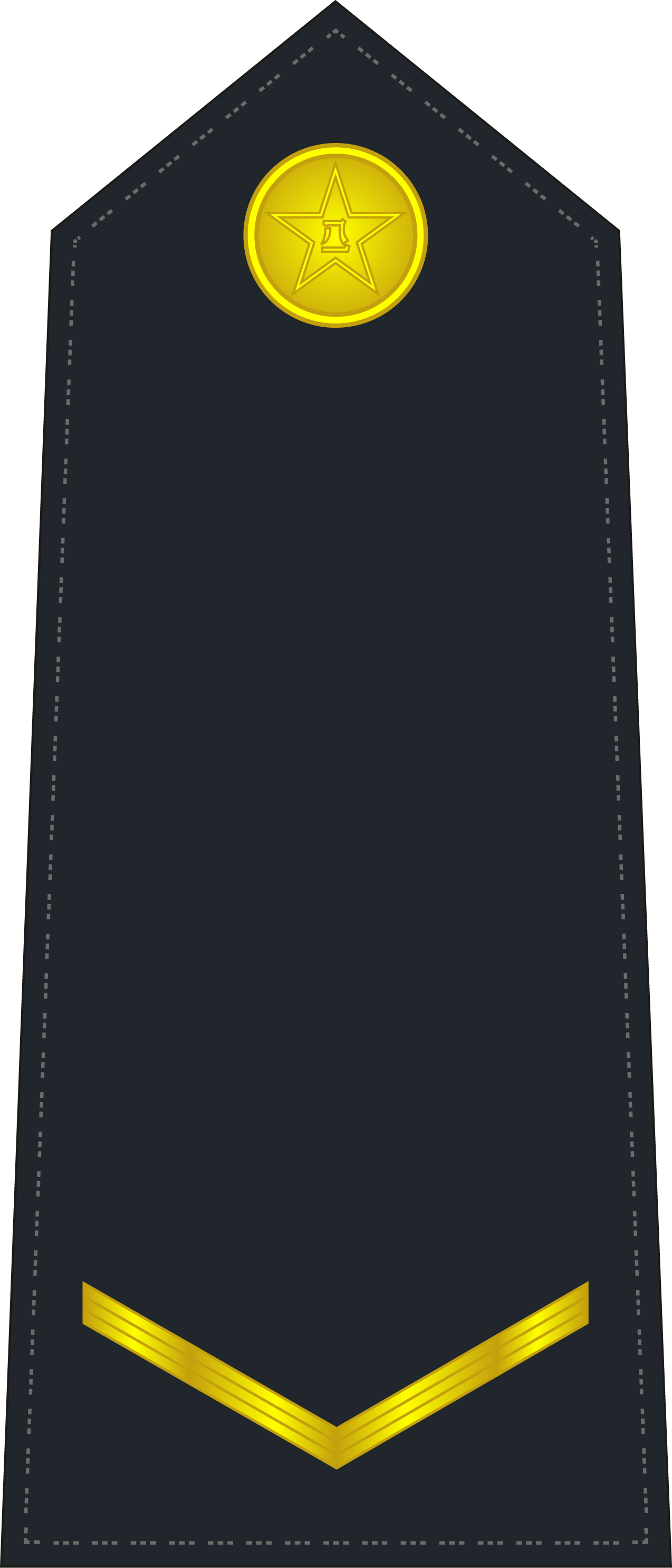
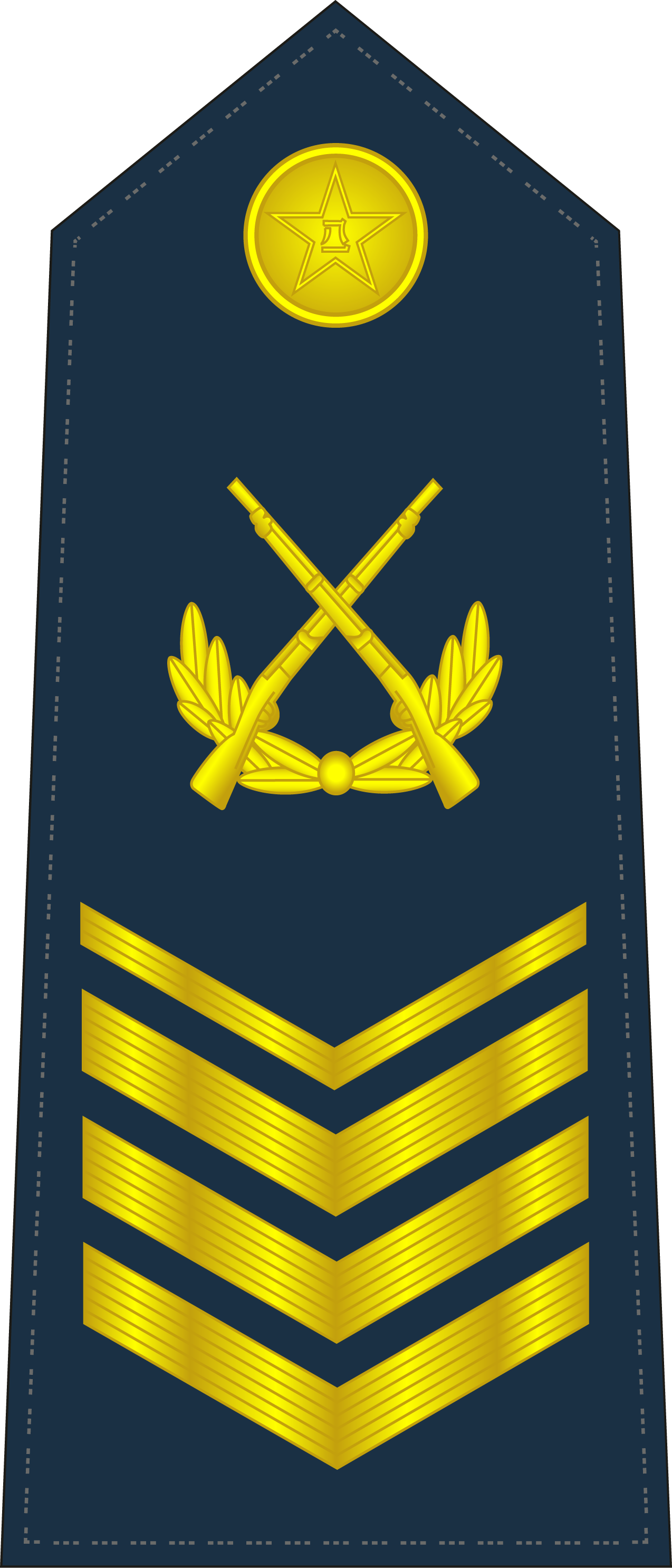
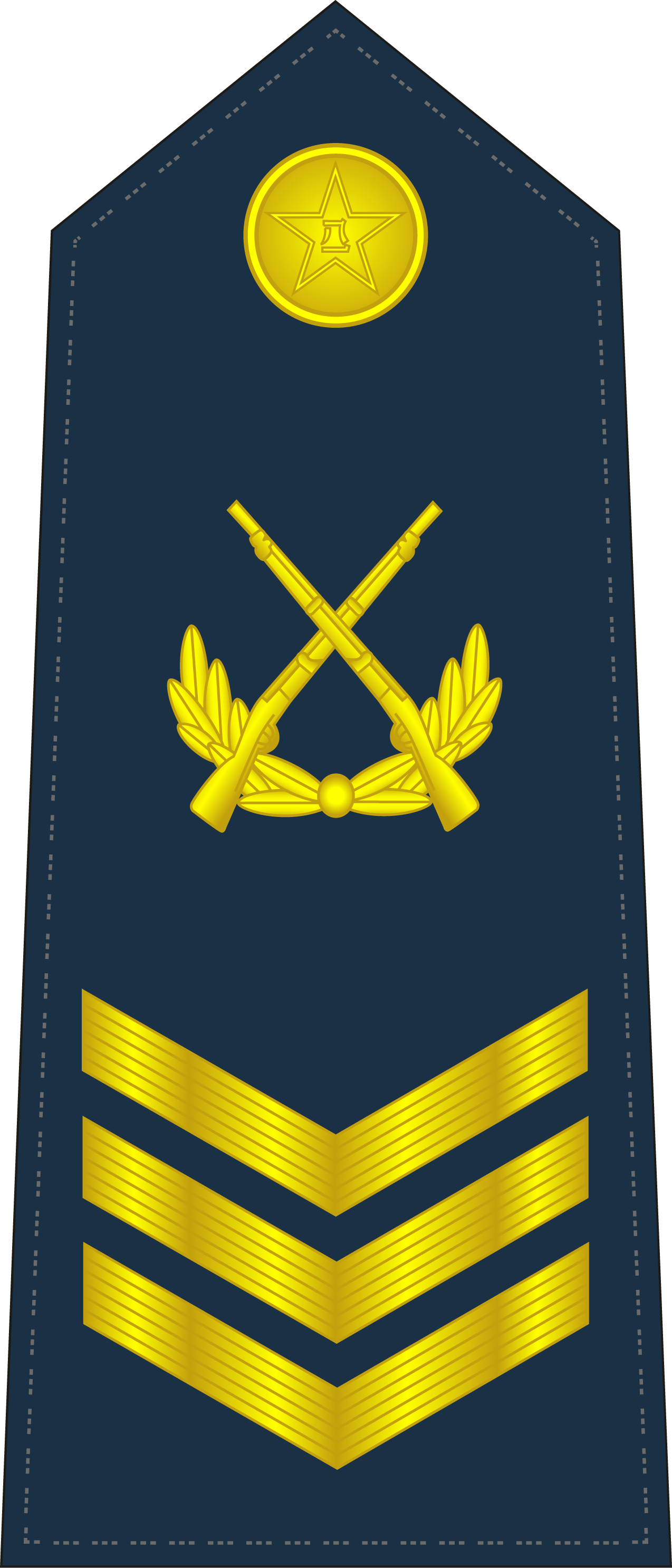
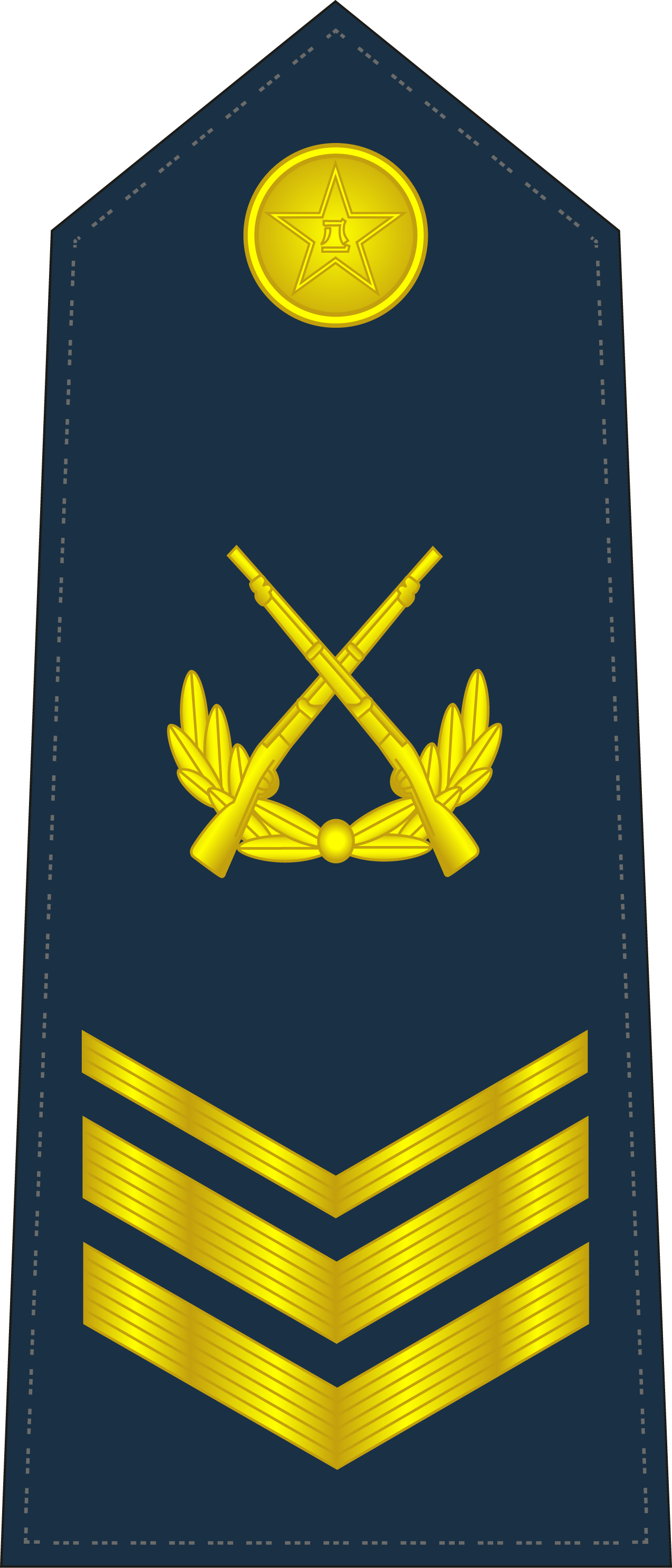
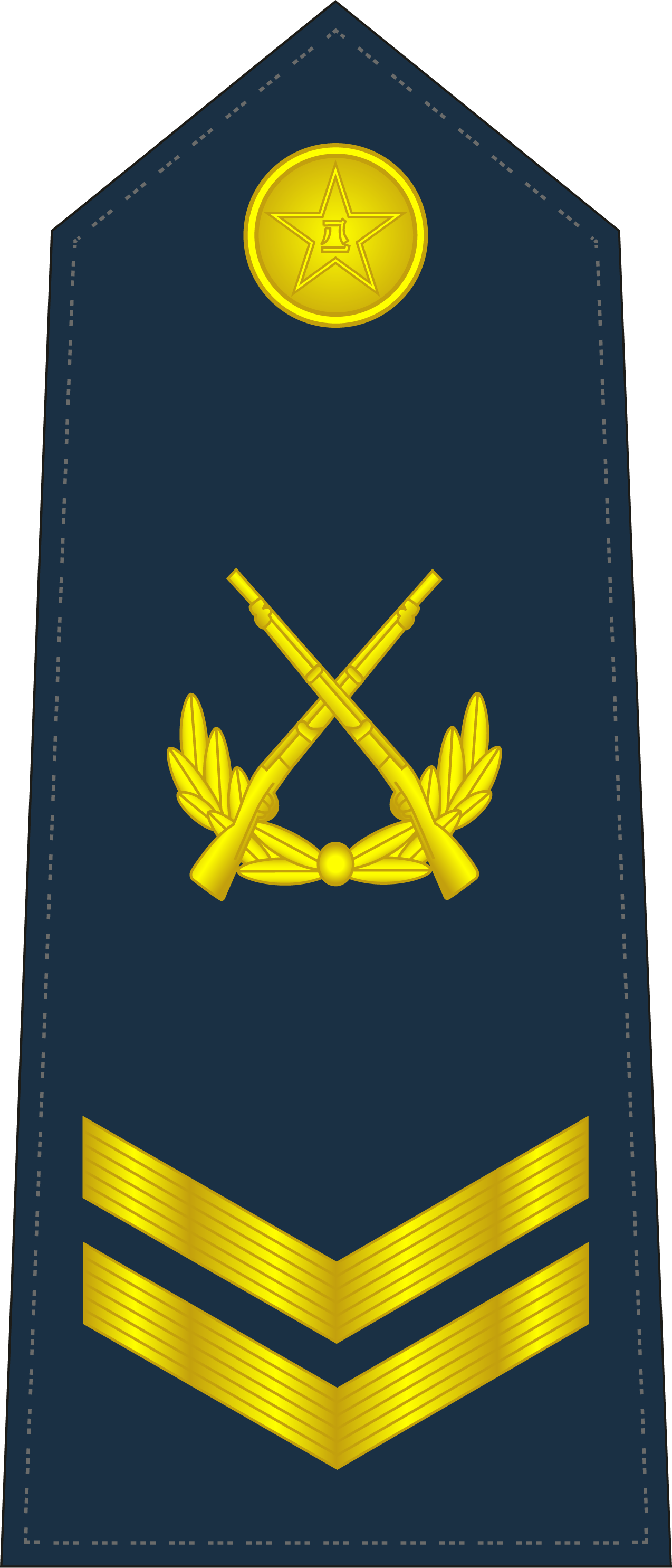
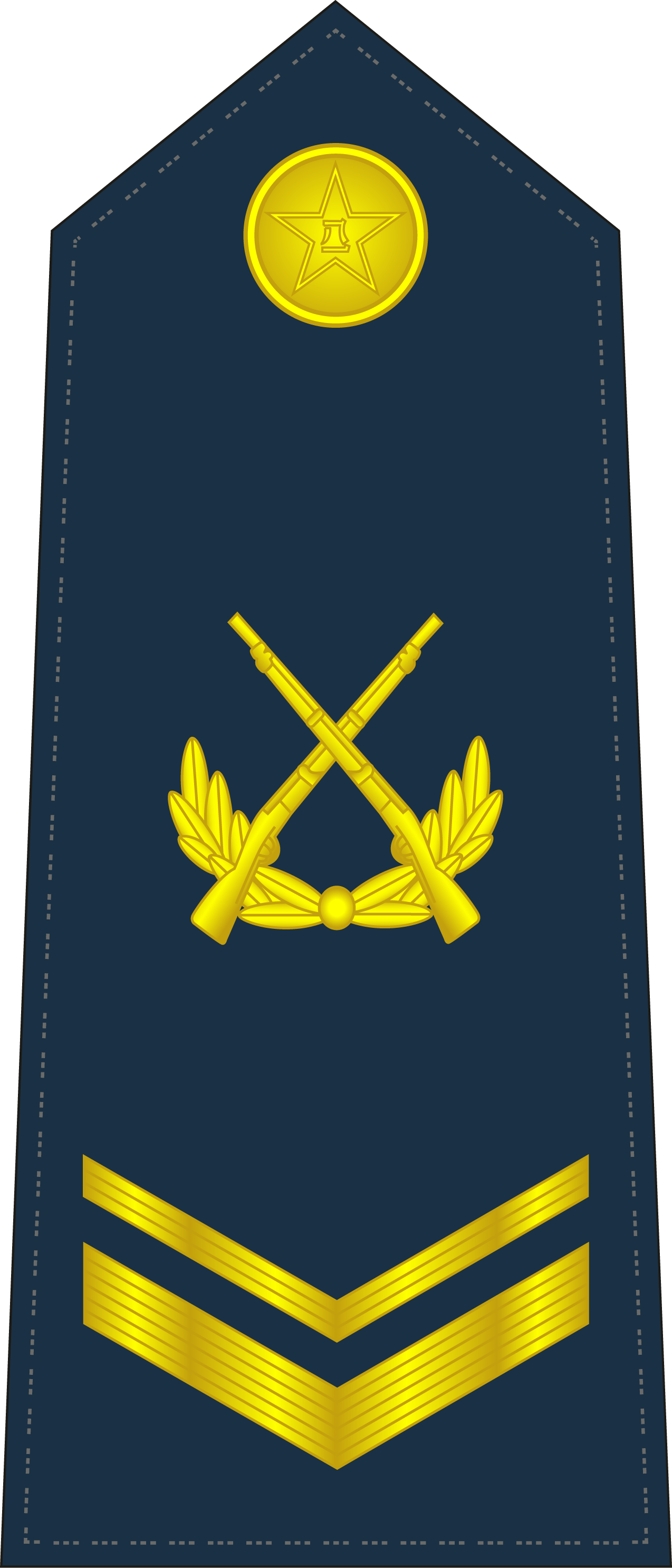
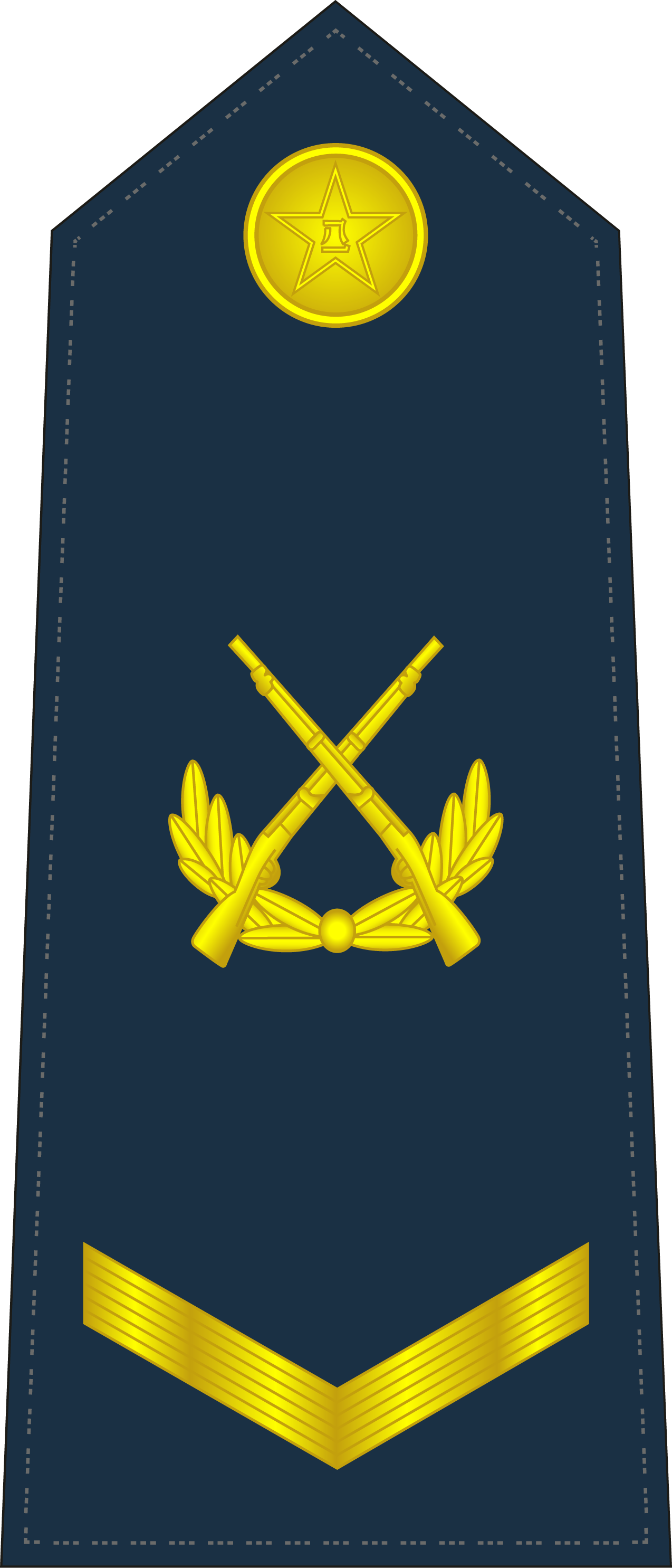
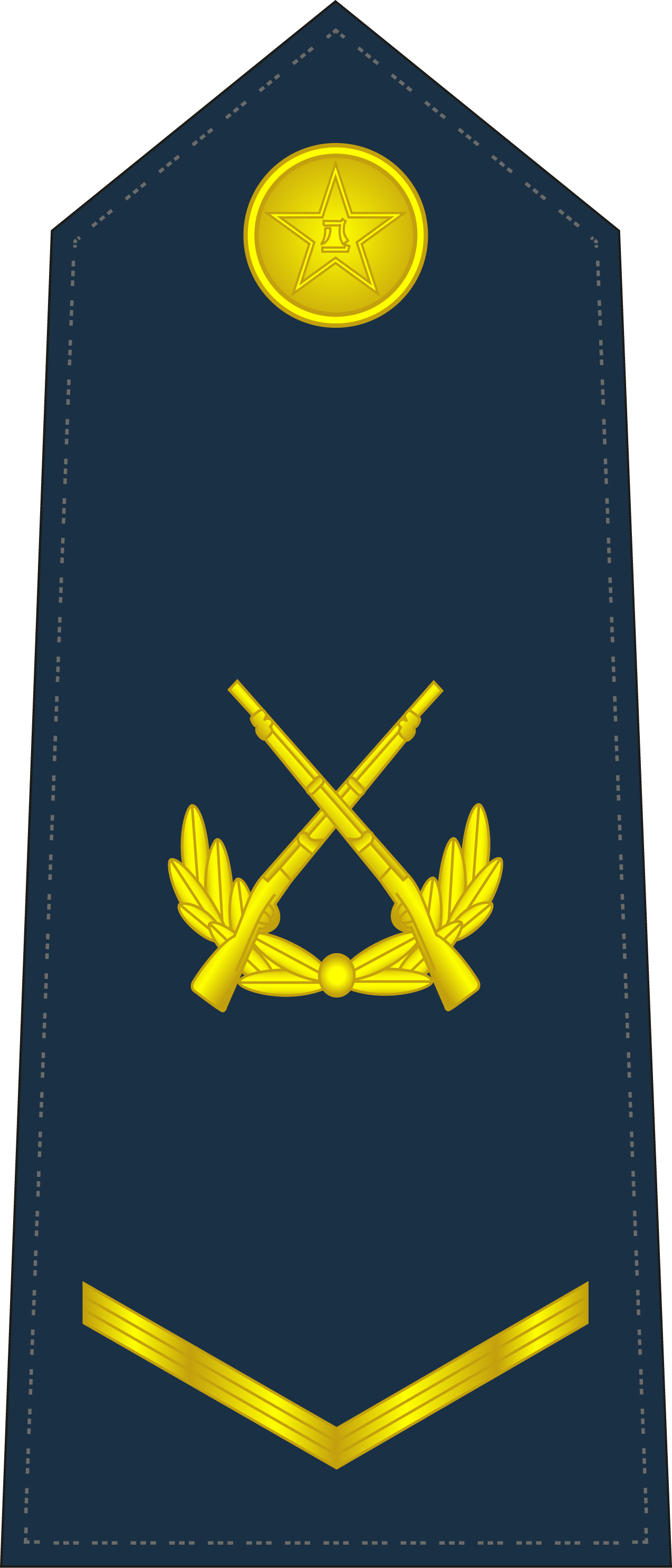
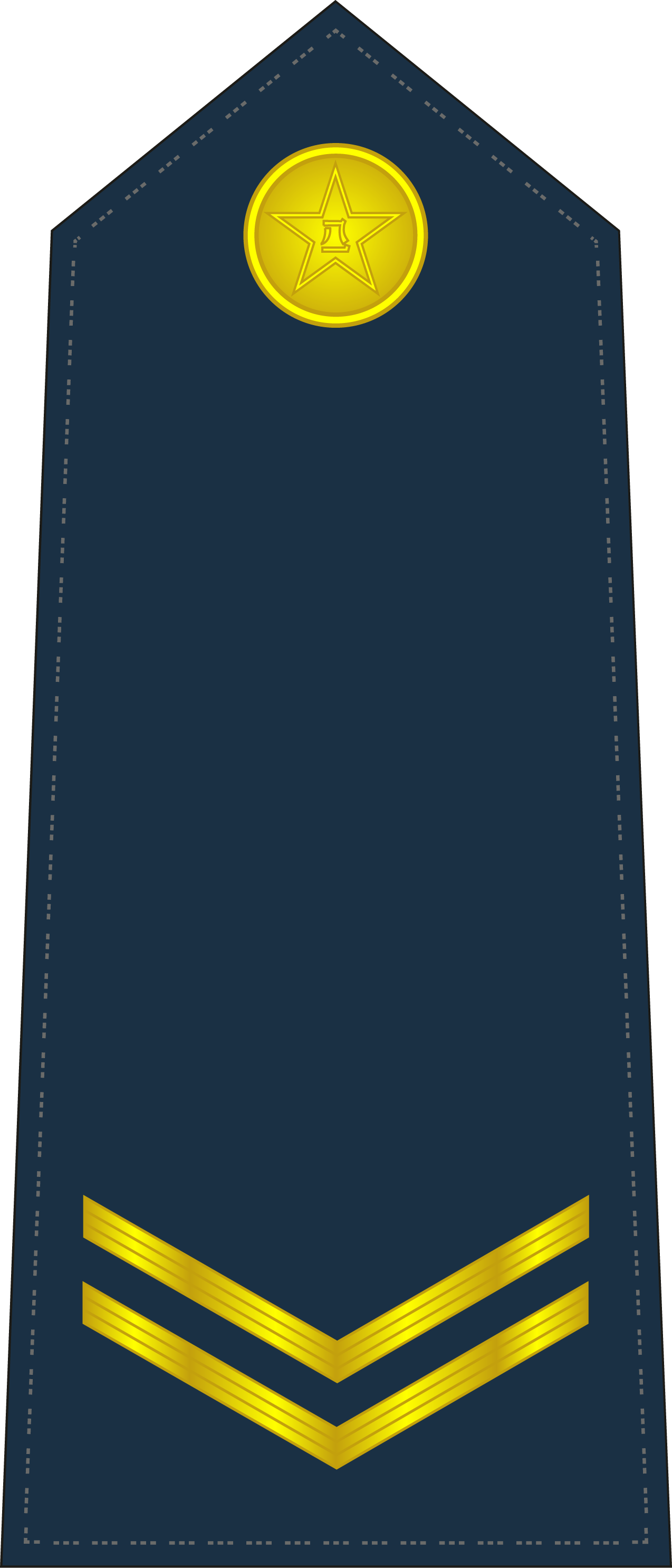
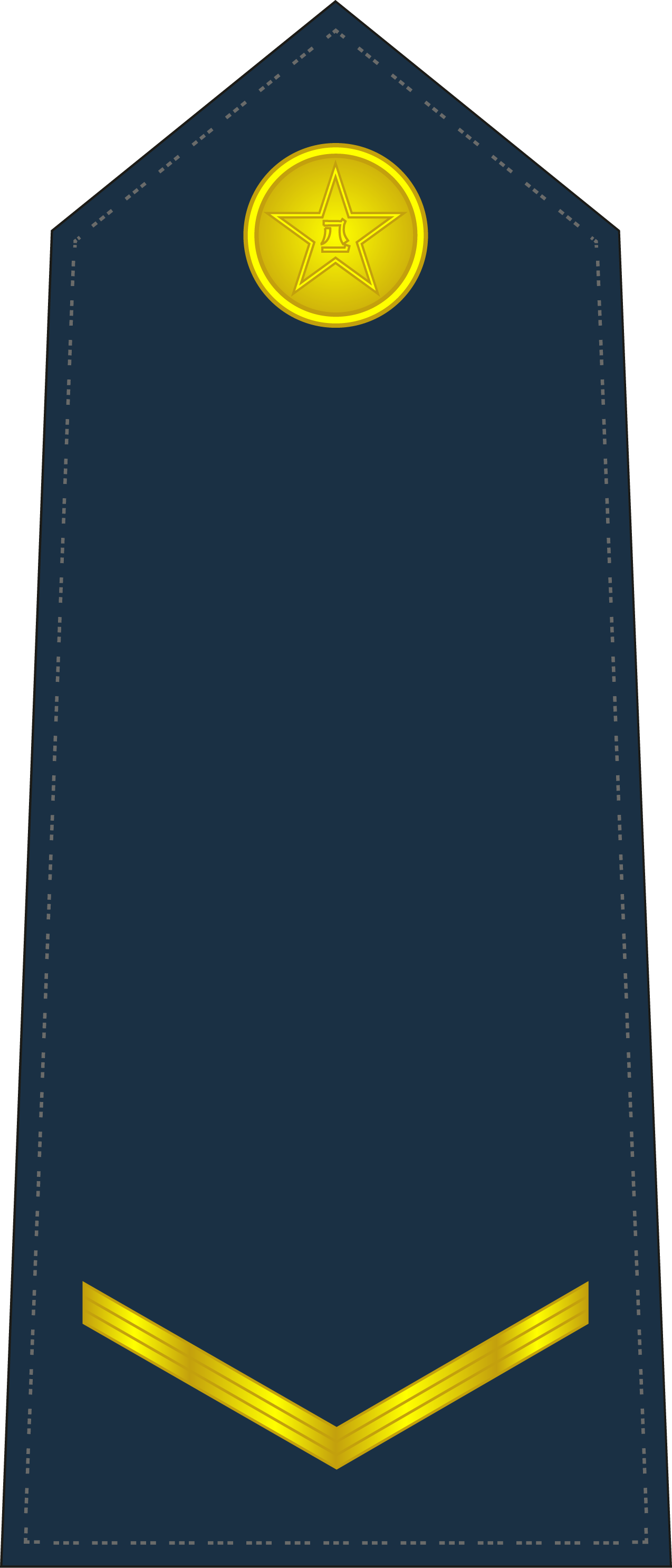
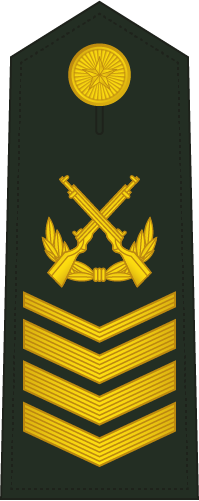
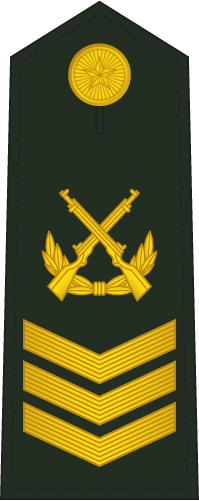
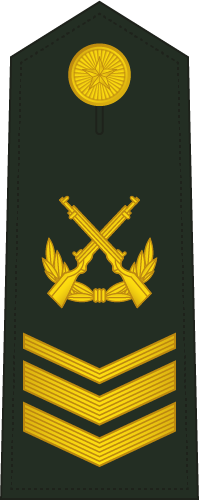
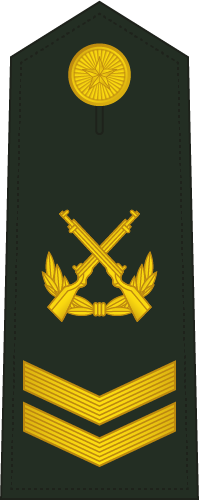
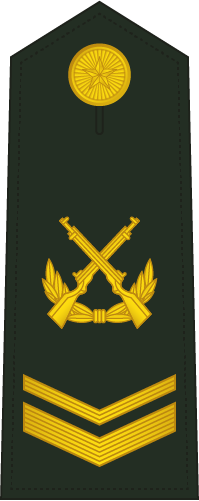
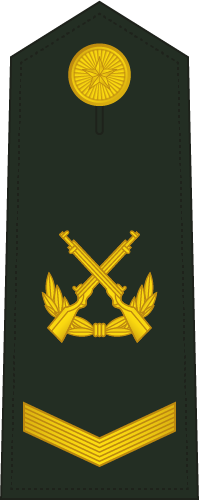
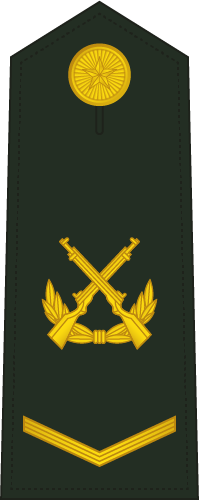
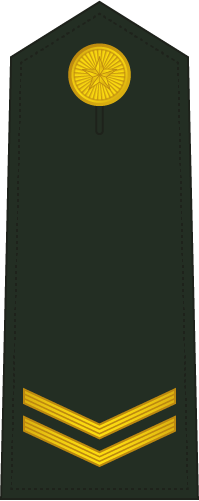
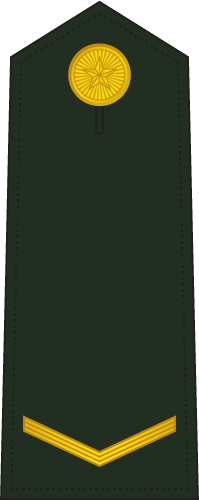
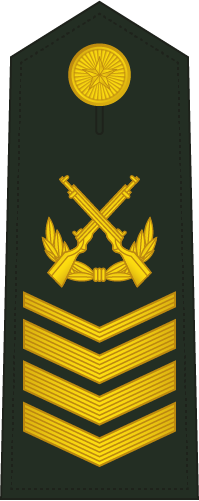
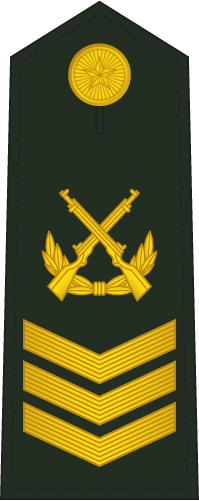
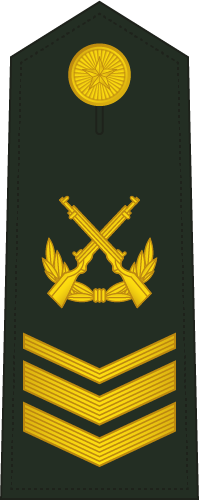
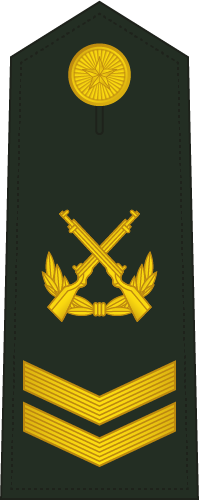
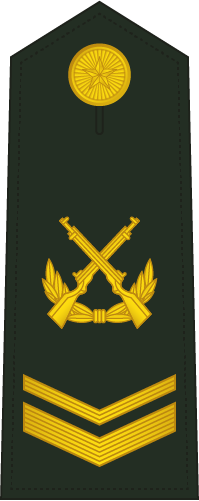
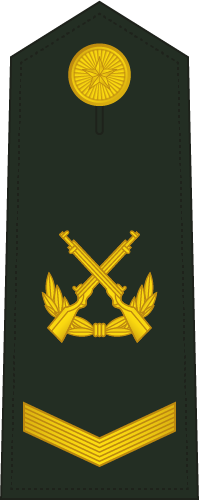
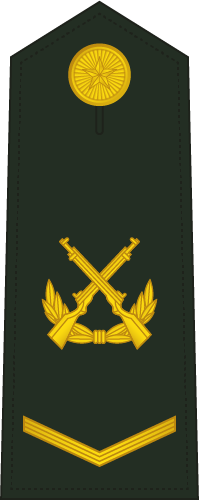
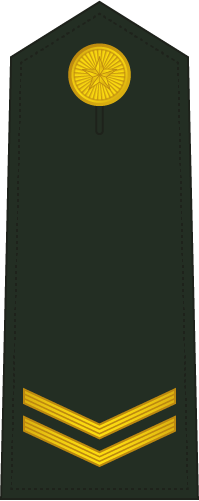
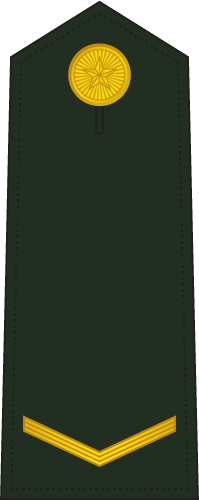
Rank group	Senior NCOs						Junior NCOs		Enlisted
PLA Ground Force
PLA Ground Force	一级军士长; Yījí jūnshìzhǎng	二级军士长; Èrjí jūnshìzhǎng	三级军士长; Sānjí jūnshìzhǎng	四级军士长; Sìjí jūnshìzhǎng	上士; Shàngshì	中士; Zhōngshì	下士; Xiàshì		上等兵; Shàngděngbīng	列兵; Lièbīng
PLA Navy
PLA Navy	海军一级军士长; Hǎijūn yījí jūnshìzhǎng	海军二级军士长; Hǎijūn èrjí jūnshìzhǎng	海军三级军士长; Hǎijūn sānjí jūnshìzhǎng	海军四级军士长; Hǎijūn sìjí jūnshìzhǎng	海军上士; Hǎijūn shàngshì	海军中士; Hǎijūn zhōngshì	海军下士; Hǎijūn xiàshì		海军上等兵; Hǎijūn shàngděngbīng	海军列兵; Hǎijūn lièbīng
PLA Air Force
PLA Air Force	空军一级军士长; Kōngjūn yījí jūnshìzhǎng	空军二级军士长; Kōngjūn èrjí jūnshìzhǎng	空军三级军士长; Kōngjūn sānjí jūnshìzhǎng	空军四级军士长; Kōngjūn sìjí jūnshìzhǎng	空军上士; Kōngjūn shàngshì	空军中士; Kōngjūn zhōngshì	空军下士; Kōngjūn xiàshì		空军上等兵; Kōngjūn shàngděngbīng	空军列兵; Kōngjūn lièbīng
PLA Rocket Force								No equivalent
PLA Rocket Force	Master sergeant class one 一级军士长 yījí jūnshìzhǎng	Master sergeant class two 二级军士长 èrjí jūnshìzhǎng	Master sergeant class three 三级军士长 sānjí jūnshìzhǎng	Master sergeant class four 四级军士长 sìjí jūnshìzhǎng	Sergeant first class 上士 shàngshì	Sergeant 中士 zhōngshì	Corporal 下士 xiàshì	No equivalent	Private first class 上等兵 shàngděngbīng	Private 列兵 lièbīng
PLA Strategic Support Force
PLA Strategic Support Force	一级军士长; Yījí jūnshìzhǎng	二级军士长; Èrjí jūnshìzhǎng	三级军士长; Sānjí jūnshìzhǎng	四级军士长; Sìjí jūnshìzhǎng	上士; Shàngshì	中士; Zhōngshì	下士; Xiàshì		上等兵; Shàngděngbīng	列兵; Lièbīng

== Weapons and equipment ==
According to the United States Department of Defense, China is developing kinetic-energy weapons, high-powered lasers, high-powered microwave weapons, particle-beam weapons, and electromagnetic pulse weapons with its increase of military fundings.

Responding to reports that its modernisation is dependent on sales of advanced technology from American allies, PLA senior leadership have stated: "Some have politicized China's normal commercial cooperation with foreign countries, damaging our reputation." These contributions include advanced European diesel engines for Chinese warships, military helicopter designs from Eurocopter, French anti-submarine sonars and helicopters, Australian technology for the Houbei class missile boat, and Israeli supplied American missile, laser and aircraft technology.

According to the Stockholm International Peace Research Institute's data, China became the world's third largest exporter of major arms in 2010–14, an increase of 143 percent from the period 2005–2009. SIPRI also calculated that China surpassed Russia to become the world's second largest arms exporter by 2020.

China's share of global arms exports hence increased from 3 to 5 percent. China supplied major arms to 35 states in 2010–14. A significant percentage (just over 68 percent) of Chinese exports went to three countries: Pakistan, Bangladesh and Myanmar. China also exported major arms to 18 African states. Examples of China's increasing global presence as an arms supplier in 2010–14 included deals with Venezuela for armoured vehicles and transport and trainer aircraft, with Algeria for three frigates, with Indonesia for the supply of hundreds of anti-ship missiles and with Nigeria for the supply of several unmanned combat aerial vehicles.

Following rapid advances in its arms industry, China has become less dependent on arms imports, which decreased by 42 percent between 2005–09 and 2010–14. Russia accounted for 61 percent of Chinese arms imports, followed by France with 16 percent and Ukraine with 13 per cent. Helicopters formed a major part of Russian and French deliveries, with the French designs produced under licence in China. From 2021 to 2026, China's arms imports fell by 72 percent; Russia accounted for 66 percent of China's arms imports.

Over the years, China has struggled to design and produce effective engines for combat and transport vehicles. It continued to import large numbers of engines from Russia and Ukraine in 2010–14 for indigenously designed combat, advanced trainer and transport aircraft, and naval ships. It also produced British-, French- and German-designed engines for combat aircraft, naval ships and armoured vehicles, mostly as part of agreements that have been in place for decades.

In August 2021, China tested a nuclear-capable hypersonic missile that circled the globe before speeding towards its target. The Financial Times reported that "the test showed that China had made astounding progress on hypersonic weapons and was far more advanced than U.S. officials realized." During the Zapad 2021 joint strategic exercise, most of the gear comprised novel Chinese arms such as the KJ-500 airborne early warning and control aircraft, J-20 and J-16 fighters, Y-20 transport planes, and surveillance and combat drones. Another joint forces exercise took place in August 2023 near Alaska.

On 24 September 2024, the PLARF performed its first intercontinental ballistic missile (ICBM) test over the Pacific Ocean since the early 1980s.

=== Cyberwarfare ===
There is a belief in the Western military doctrines that the PLA have already begun engaging countries using cyber-warfare. There has been a significant increase in the number of presumed Chinese military initiated cyber events from 1999 to the present day.

Cyberwarfare has gained recognition as a valuable technique because it is an asymmetric technique that is a part of information operations and information warfare. As is written by two PLAGF Colonels, Qiao Liang and Wang Xiangsui in the book Unrestricted Warfare, "Methods that are not characterized by the use of the force of arms, nor by the use of military power, nor even by the presence of casualties and bloodshed, are just as likely to facilitate the successful realization of the war's goals, if not more so.

While China has long been suspected of cyber spying, on 24 May 2011 the PLA announced the existence of having 'cyber capabilities'.

In February 2013, the media named "Comment Crew" as a hacker military faction for China's People's Liberation Army. In May 2014, a Federal Grand Jury in the United States indicted five Unit 61398 officers on criminal charges related to cyber attacks on private companies based in the United States after alleged investigations by the Federal Bureau of Investigation who exposed their identities in collaboration with US intelligence agencies such as the CIA.

In February 2020, the United States government indicted members of China's People's Liberation Army for the 2017 Equifax data breach, which involved hacking into Equifax and plundering sensitive data as part of a massive heist that also included stealing trade secrets, though the CCP denied these claims.

=== Nuclear capabilities ===
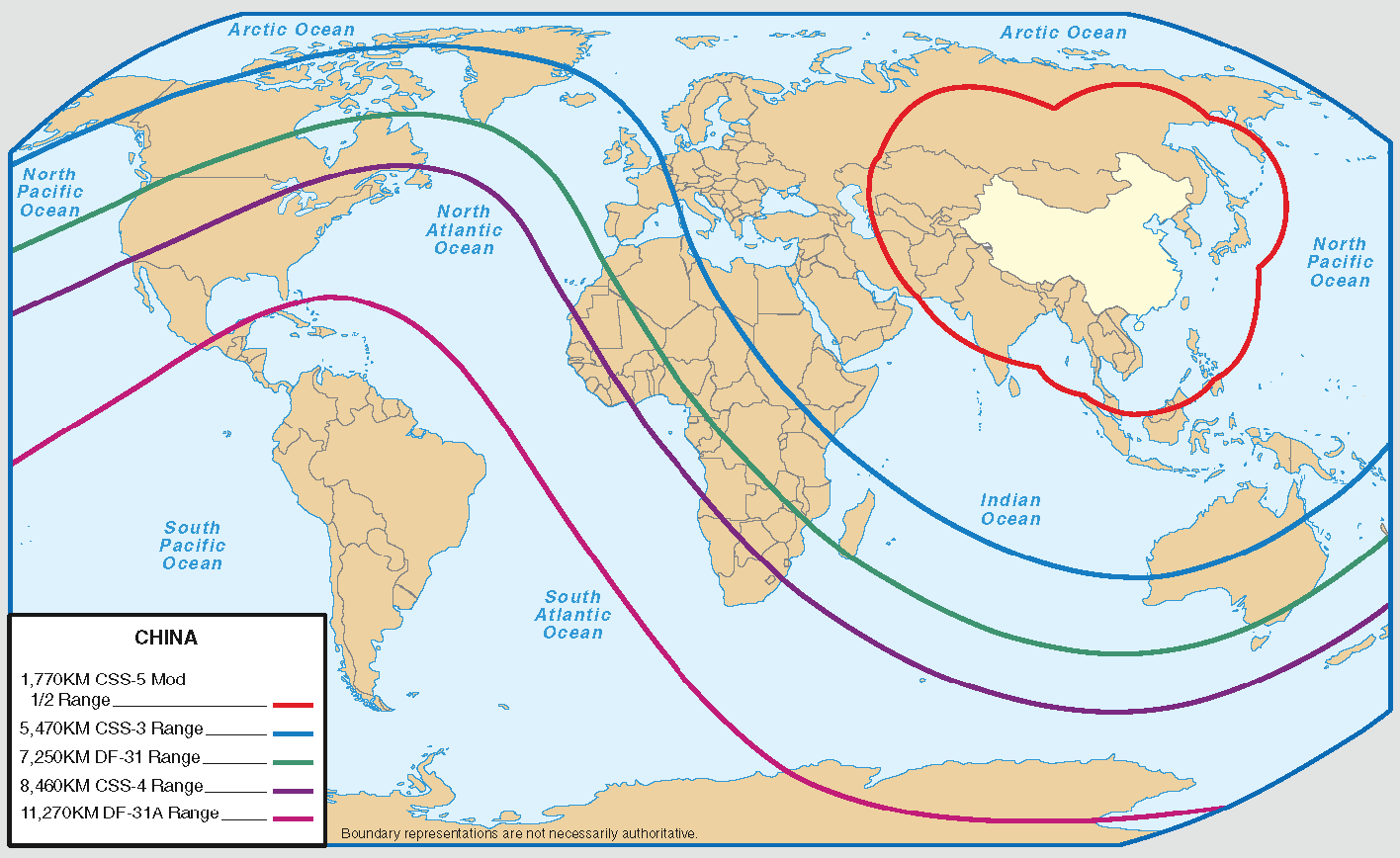
The range of the PLA Rocket Force's medium and intercontinental ballistic missiles (2006)

The first of China's nuclear weapons tests took place in 1964, and its first hydrogen bomb test occurred in 1967 at Lop Nur. Tests continued until 1996, when the country signed the Comprehensive Nuclear-Test-Ban Treaty (CTBT), but did not ratify it.

The number of nuclear warheads in China's arsenal remains a state secret. There are varying estimates of the size of China's arsenal. The Bulletin of the Atomic Scientists and Federation of American Scientists estimated in 2024 that China has a stockpile of approximately 438 nuclear warheads, while the United States Department of Defense put the estimate at more than 500 operational nuclear warheads, making it the third-largest in the world.

China's policy has traditionally been one of no first use while maintaining a deterrent retaliatory force targeted for countervalue targets. According to a 2023 study by the National Defense University, China's nuclear doctrine has historically leaned toward maintaining a secure second-strike capability.

=== Space ===
Having witnessed the crucial role of space to United States military success in the Gulf War, China continues to view space as a critical domain in both conflict and international strategic competition. The PLA operates a various satellite constellations performing reconnaissance, navigation, communication, and counterspace functions. Planners at PLA's National Defense University project China's space actions as retaliatory or preventative, following conditions like an attack on a Chinese satellite, an attack on China, or the interruption of a PLA amphibious landing. According to this approach, PLA planners assume that the country must have the capacity for retaliation and second-strike capability against a powerful opponent. PLA planners envision a limited space war and therefore seek to identify weak but critical nodes in other space systems.

Significant components of the PLA's space-based reconnaissance include Jianbing (vanguard) satellites with cover names Yaogan (遥感; 'remote sensing') and Gaofen (高分; 'high resolution'). These satellites collect electro-optical (EO) imagery to collect a literal representation of a target, synthetic aperture radar (SAR) imagery to penetrate the cloudy climates of southern China, and electronic intelligence (ELINT) to provide targeting intelligence on adversarial ships. The PLA also leverages a restricted, high-performance service of the country's BeiDou positioning, navigation, and timing (PNT) satellites for its forces and intelligence, surveillance, and reconnaissance (ISR) platforms. For secure communications, the PLA uses the Zhongxing and Fenghuo series of satellites which enable secure data and voice transmission over C-band, Ku-band, and UHF. PLA deployment of anti-satellite and counterspace satellites including those of the Shijian and Shiyan series have also brought significant concern from western nations.

The PLA also plays a significant role in the Chinese space program. To date, all the participants have been selected from members of the PLA Air Force. China became the third country in the world to have sent a man into space by its own means with the flight of Yang Liwei aboard the Shenzhou 5 spacecraft on 15 October 2003, the flight of Fei Junlong and Nie Haisheng aboard Shenzhou 6 on 12 October 2005, and Zhai Zhigang, Liu Boming, and Jing Haipeng aboard Shenzhou 7 on 25 September 2008.

The PLA started the development of an anti-ballistic and anti-satellite system in the 1960s, code named Project 640, including ground-based lasers and anti-satellite missiles. On 11 January 2007, China conducted a successful test of an anti-satellite missile, with an SC-19 class KKV.

The PLA has tested two types of hypersonic space vehicles, the Shenglong Spaceplane and a new one built by Chengdu Aircraft Corporation. Only a few pictures have appeared since it was revealed in late 2007. Earlier, images of the High-enthalpy Shock Waves Laboratory wind tunnel of the CAS Key Laboratory of high-temperature gas dynamics (LHD) were published in the Chinese media. Tests with speeds up to Mach 20 were reached around 2001.

== Budget ==
China's official military budget for 2025 was at 1.78 trillion yuan (US$246 billion), which is an increase of 7.2% over the last year. The Stockholm International Peace Research Institute (SIPRI) estimated that China's military expenditure was US$336 billion in 2025, the second-largest in the world after the United States and accounting for 12 percent of the world's defence expenditures.

Further information: List of countries with highest military expenditures

Military spending, top 25 countries by % GDP, 2024
Country	% GDP spent on military
Ukraine	34.5
Israel	8.8
Algeria	8.0
Saudi Arabia	7.3
Russia	7.1
Myanmar	6.8
Oman	5.6
Armenia	5.5
Azerbaijan	5.0
Kuwait	4.8
Jordan	4.8
Burkina Faso	4.7
Mali	4.2
Poland	4.2
Burundi	3.8
Brunei	3.6
Morocco	3.5
United States	3.4
Estonia	3.4
Colombia	3.4
Latvia	3.3
Greece	3.1
Lithuania	3.1
Chad	3.0
Kyrgyzstan	3.0

Military spending, top 25 countries by PPP, 2024
Country	$billions spent on military
United States	997
China	567
Russia	401
India	308
Ukraine	183
South Korea	96
Germany	99
Japan	91
France	91
United Kingdom	86
Brazil	64
Poland	62
Italy	60
Turkey	59
Indonesia	47
Colombia	43
Mexico	40
Spain	39
Australia	31
Canada	31
Netherlands	21
Philippines	21
Romania	21
Greece	17
Malaysia	14

== Symbols ==
=== Anthem ===
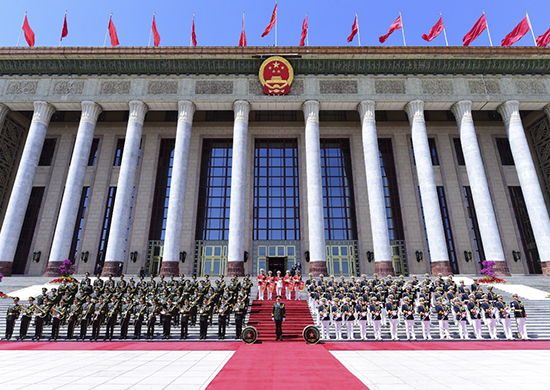
The Central Military Band of the People's Liberation Army of China at the Great Hall of the People. The band is a common performer of the military anthem of the PLA at ceremonial protocol events.

The March of the Chinese People's Liberation Army was adopted as the military anthem by the Central Military Commission on 25 July 1988. The lyrics of the anthem were written by composer Gong Mu (real name: Zhang Yongnian; Chinese: 张永年) and the music was composed by Korea-born Chinese composer Zheng Lücheng.

=== Flag and insignia ===
The PLA's insignia consists of a roundel with a red star bearing the two Chinese characters "八一" (literally "eight-one"), referring to the Nanchang uprising which began on 1 August 1927 (first day of the eighth month) and symbolic as the CCP's founding of the PLA. The inclusion of the two characters ("八一") is symbolic of the party's revolutionary history carrying strong emotional connotations of the political power which it shed blood to obtain. The flag of the Chinese People's Liberation Army is the war flag of the People's Liberation Army; the layout of the flag has a golden star at the top left corner and "八一" to the right of the star, placed on a red field. Each service branch also has its flags: The top 5/8 of the flags is the same as the PLA flag; the bottom 3/8 are occupied by the colors of the branches.

The flag of the Ground Forces has a forest green bar at the bottom. The naval ensign has stripes of blue and white at the bottom. The Air Force uses a sky blue bar. The Rocket Force uses a yellow bar at the bottom. The forest green represents the earth, the blue and white stripes represent the seas, the sky blue represents the air and the yellow represents the flare of missile launching.

PLA

Ground Force

Navy

Air Force

Rocket Force

== See also ==
- Outline of the Chinese Civil War
- Outline of the military history of the People's Republic of China
- Republic of China Armed Forces

Preceded by Eighth Route Army and New Fourth Army	Armed wing of the Chinese Communist Party; 1 November 1948 – present	Incumbent
