= General Office of the Central Military Commission =

Chinese government office, 2016-

- 中央军事委员会办公厅

Agency overview
- Formed: 1949; 77 years ago
- Type: Administrative agency
- Jurisdiction: People's Liberation Army
- Headquarters: "August 1st Building", Beijing
- Agency executives: Fang Yongxiang, Director; Tian Yixiang, Deputy Director
- Parent department: Central Military Commission
- Website: chinamil.com.cn

General Office of the Central Military Commission
- Simplified Chinese: 中央军事委员会办公厅
- Traditional Chinese: 中央軍事委員會辦公廳
Transcriptions
Standard Mandarin
- Hanyu Pinyin: Zhōngyāng Jūnshì Wěiyuánhuì Bàngōngtīng

Abbreviation
- Simplified Chinese: 中央军委办公厅
- Traditional Chinese: 中央軍委辦公廳
Transcriptions
Standard Mandarin
- Hanyu Pinyin: Zhōngyāng Jūnwěi Bàngōngtīng

Second alternative Chinese name
- Simplified Chinese: 军办
- Traditional Chinese: 軍辦
Transcriptions
Standard Mandarin
- Hanyu Pinyin: Jūnbàn

The General Office of the Central Military Commission is an administrative agency of the Central Military Commission at the theater deputy-grade, which assists the leaders with the day to day administrative operations of the CMC. Like all other CMC departments, it is a one institution with two names with both a state and Communist party name.

== History ==
On November 11, 1949, the General Office of the People's Revolutionary Military Commission of the Central People's Government was established in the Jurentang of Zhongnanhai in Beijing as the administrative agency of the Central People's Revolutionary Military Commission. On 28 September 1954, the Politburo of the Chinese Communist Party decided to re-establish the Central Military Commission of the CCP, with Mao Zedong as chairman, with 12 members, and no vice chairman or standing committee members. Peng Dehuai presided over the work of the CMC, and Huang Kecheng was selected as the Secretary-General. The General Office also served as the General Office of the Ministry of National Defense, and also had jurisdiction over the General Staff Headquarters office and management section. On 27 November 1954, the office was renamed "General Office of the Central Military Commission of the Communist Party of China", serving concurrently as the General Office of the Ministry of National Defense. The daily work of the CMC General Office was presided over by the Secretary-General and Deputy Secretary-General. At the end of 1955, the CMC General Office moved out of Zhongnanhai.

In November 1965, in the run-in to the Cultural Revolution, Xiao Xiangrong, who had long served as the director of the CMC General Office, was criticized and dismissed for opposing "giving prominence to politics" (“突出政治” - Lin Biao's plan to focus military training on Mao Zedong thought). The General Staff sent a working group to the General Office to carry out the "four clean-ups" in the agency. At the same time, the CCP Central Committee approved the creation of a General Office of the General Staff Department that would also serve as the General Office of the CMC. Yang Chengwu was appointed as the director of the General Office of the General Staff. The CMC General Office became a second-level department of the General Staff. After November 1969, all GO assets, as well as the Foreign Affairs Bureau, were transferred to the General Staff Administration Department. At the end of 1970, the seal of the "General Office of the General Staff of the People's Liberation Army" started to be officially used.

In April 1979, the General Office was separated from the General Staff and subordinated directly to the Central Military Commission of the Communist Party of China, but it still served as the General Office of the Ministry of National Defense. After June 1983, it also served as the General Office of the Central Military Commission of the People's Republic of China.

Before the 2016 reforms, the General Office had the following structure:

- Office of the CMC Chairman (中央军委主席办公室)
- Political Work Department (政治部)
- Secretariat Bureau (秘书局)
- Comprehensive Research Bureau (综合调研局)
- Secrecy Bureau (保密局)
- Management Bureau (管理局)

Directly subordinate units

  - Beidahe Office (北戴河办事处(
  - Sanzuomen Reception Office (三座门接待处)
  - August First Building Management Office (八一大楼管理处)、
  - Logistics Support Service Center (后勤保障服务中心)

In November 2015, as part of military reforms, the department was reorganized into the General Office of the Central Military Commission.

== Organization ==
After the 2016 reforms, the organization of the CMC General Office is as follows:

=== Internal Offices ===
- General Office Secretariat (秘书局)
- Guard Bureau (警卫局)
- Political Work Bureau (政治工作局)
- Comprehensive Support Bureau (综合保障局)
- Classified Information Bureau (机要局)
- Secrecy and Archives Bureau (保密和档案局)
- Complaints and Proposals Bureau (信访局)
- Legislative Bureau (法制局)
- Office of the CMC Chairman (军委主席办公室)
- Beidaihe Office (北戴河办事处)

=== Directly subordinate units ===
- 51st Laboratory (军委办公厅第五十一研究所)
- Information Security Equipment Testing and Validation Center (信息安全设备测评认证中心)

== Leadership ==
=== Director of the General Office of the Central People's Government People's Revolutionary Military Commission ===
1. Luo Guibo (罗贵波) (November 1949–November 1950)
2. Zhang Jingwu (张经武) (January 1950–January 1952, concurrent tenure)
3. Zhu Zaoguan (朱早观) (January 1952–October 1952, interim)
4. Maj Gen Xiao Xiangrong (萧向荣) (October 1952–November 1965)

=== Director of the General Office of the CCP Central Military Commission ===
Also the director the General Office of the PRC Central Military Commission from June 1983

1. Lt Gen Xiao Xiangrong (萧向荣) (November 1954–November 1965, concurrent tenure)
2. Yang Chengwu (杨成武) (November 1965–the end of 1966, concurrent tenure)
3. Lu Yang (路扬) (Interim director from August 1967 to November 1967, director from November 1967 to March 24, 1968)
4. Xiao Jianfei (萧剑飞) (May 1969–September 1971)
5. Vacant (September 1971–January 1975, deputy director Jin Tao insisted on keeping working)
6. Hu Wei (胡炜) (January 1975–February 1977, concurrent tenure)
7. Xiao Hongda (萧洪达) (October 1977–September 1986)
8. Lt Gen Liu Kai (刘凯) (October 1987–December 1990)
9. Lt Gen Li Jijun (李际均) (January 1991–November 1992)
10. Lt Gen Cheng Jianning (程建宁) (January 1993–November 1995)
11. Lt Gen Dong Liangju (董良驹) (March 1996–December 1999)
12. Lt Gen Tan Yuexin (谭悦新) (December 1999–December 2003)
13. Lt Gen Jia Ting'an (贾廷安) (December 2003–December 2007)
14. Lt Gen Wang Guanzhong (王冠中) (December 2007–October 2012)
15. Rear Adm Qin Shengxiang (秦生祥) (December 2012–November 2015)

=== Director of the General Office of the Central Military Commission ===
1. Rear Adm Qin Shengxiang (秦生祥) (November 2015–August 2017)
2. Lt Gen Zhong Shaojun (钟绍军) (August 2017– March 2024)
3. Lt Gen Fang Yongxiang (方永祥) (March 2024- present)

== See also ==
- Central Military Commission (China)
- General Office
  - General Office of the Chinese Communist Party
  - General Office of the State Council
