= Office for International Military Cooperation of the Central Military Commission =

Chinese military office

- 中央军委国际军事合作办公室

Agency overview
- Formed: 2016
- Type: Administrative agency
- Jurisdiction: People's Liberation Army
- Headquarters: Ministry of National Defense compound ("August 1st Building"), Beijing
- Agency executive: Li Bin, Director
- Parent department: Central Military Commission
- Website: chinamil.com.cn

Office for International Military Cooperation of the Central Military Commission
- Simplified Chinese: 中央军委国际军事合作办公室
- Traditional Chinese: 中央軍委會國際軍事合作辦公室
Transcriptions
Standard Mandarin
- Hanyu Pinyin: Zhōngyāng Jūnwěi Guójì Jūnshì Hézuò Bàngōngshì

The Office for International Military Cooperation of the Central Military Commission is a functional department under the Central Military Commission of the People's Republic of China of corps grade, charged with coordinating the People's Liberation Army's relationships with foreign militaries. It grew out of the PLA's Foreign Affairs Office, founded in 1951. It was founded on January 11, 2016, under Xi Jinping's military reforms. Its current director is Major General Li Bin.

== History ==
The External Liaison Office of the People's Revolutionary Military Commission was founded in 1951. After the Ministry of National Defense was founded in 1954, the PLA used the External Liaison Office as a base to establish the Foreign Affairs Office (FAO), under the dual authority of the Intelligence Bureau of the General Staff Department and the General Office of the Ministry of National Defense (MND); in 1959, it was placed solely under the Ministry's General Office. In January 1964, the FAO was expanded to become the Foreign Affairs Bureau of the General Office of the MND. It created its own General Office, as well as three divisions; a military attaché division, a military assistance division, and a research division.

In 1965, the bureau became subordinate to the General Staff Department and underwent unknown reorganizational changes. In December 1998, the bureau's name was changed to the Foreign Affairs Office; it was also promoted to become a corps-level organization. The PLA went through significant organizational restructuring on 11 January 2016; and the Office was renamed to the Office for International Military Cooperation and became the 13th ranking department of the Central Military Commission. It is also believed to be "one institution with two names" with the Office for International Military Cooperation of the Ministry of National Defense.

== Organization ==
After the 2015 reforms, the Office of International Military Cooperation is organized as below:

=== Functional Departments ===
- General Office (综合局)
- African Bureau (亚洲局)
- Eurasian Bureau (欧亚局)
- Americas and Oceania Bureau (美洲大洋洲局)
- Treaty Affairs Bureau (履约事务局)

=== Directly Subordinate Units ===
- Security Cooperation Center (安全合作中心)
- Arms Control and Compliance Affairs Office (军控和履约事务办公室)
  - Compliance Affairs Bureau (履约事务局)

=== External Units ===
- Military Attaches in PRC's diplomatic missions (各驻外外交代表机构武官处)
- Military Attache in PRC's United Nations delegation (中国常驻联合国代表团军事参谋团)

== List of leaders ==
=== Directors ===
English name	Chinese name	Took office	Left office	Notes
Guan Youfei	关友飞	January 2016	2017	
Hu Changming	胡昌明	2017	December 2018	
Ci Guowei	慈国巍	December 2018	Incumbent	

== See also ==
- Central Military Commission (China)
- Ministry of National Defense (China)
