= Office for Strategic Planning of the Central Military Commission =

Chief organ under the Central Military Commission

- 中央军事委员会战略规划办公室

Agency overview
- Formed: 2016
- Type: Administrative agency
- Jurisdiction: People's Liberation Army
- Headquarters: Ministry of National Defense compound ("August 1st Building"), Beijing
- Agency executive: Wang Huiqing, Director
- Parent department: Central Military Commission
- Website: chinamil.com.cn

The Office for Strategic Planning of the Central Military Commission (Chinese: 中央军事委员会战略规划办公室) is the chief organ under the Central Military Commission of the People's Republic of China. It was founded on January 11, 2016, under Xi Jinping's military reforms.

Its current director is Wang Huiqing.

== See also ==
- Central Military Commission (China)
