= Jingxi Hotel =

Hotel in Beijing, China

Coordinates: 39.905336°N 116.312767°E

- Simplified Chinese: 京西宾馆
- Traditional Chinese: 京西賓館
- Literal meaning: Capital West Guesthouse
Transcriptions
Standard Mandarin
- Hanyu Pinyin: Jīngxī Bīnguǎn

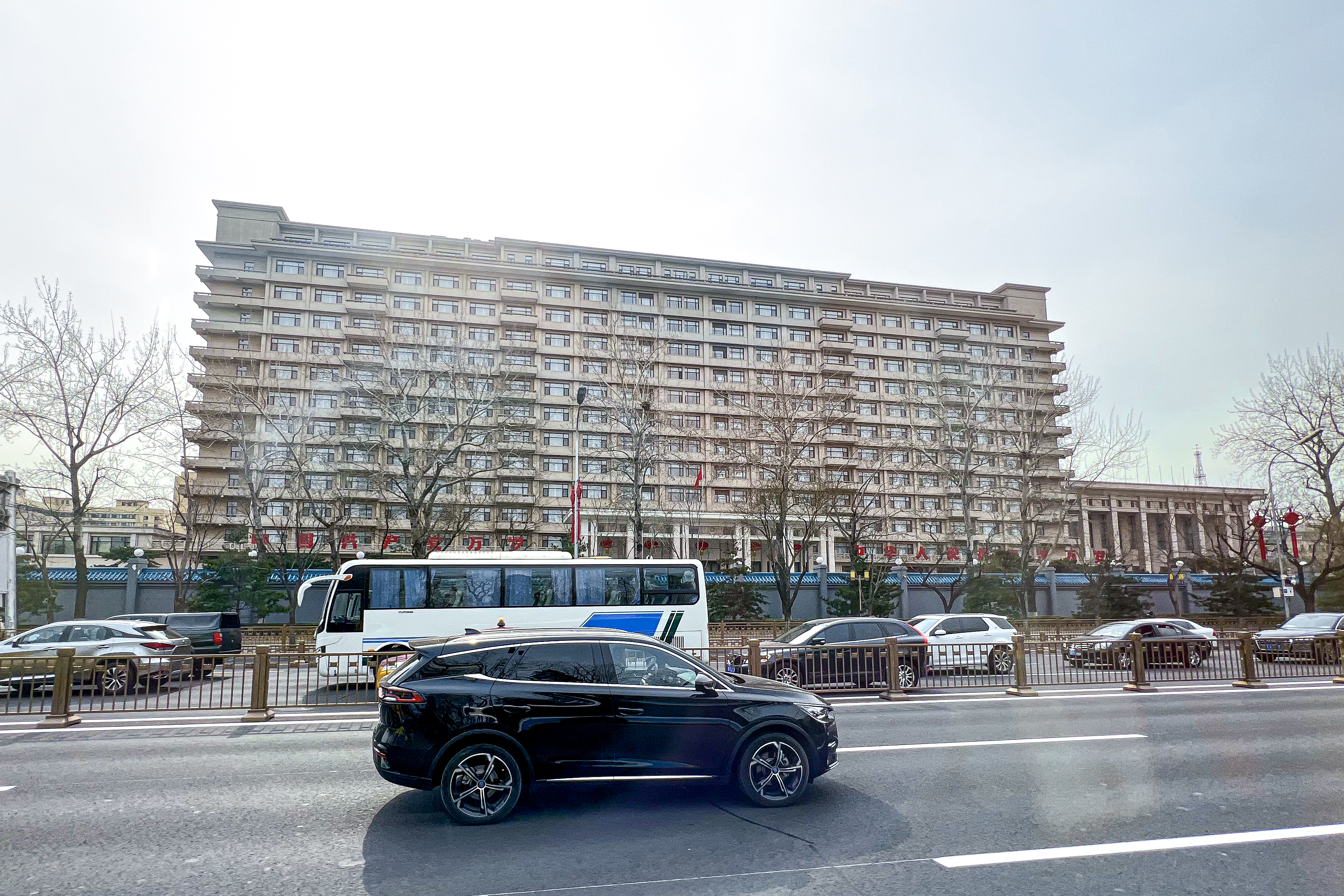
Jingxi Hotel

The Jingxi Hotel is a high-profile hotel located at Yangfangdian Road, Haidian, Beijing, used for government officials and an internal meeting place. Located near the Military Museum and Defense Ministry, it is subordinate to the Agency for Offices Administration of the Central Military Commission. It was the residence of the delegates of the Military Commission during the Congress, and successive leaders of the Party and the State have attended many relevant meetings in the hotel.

The Jingxi Hotel was also the designated residence of top leaders from various provinces and cities when they came to Beijing. During the 40 years from September 14, 1964 to 2004, it has received 29 meetings of the National People's Congress, including the 3rd plenary session of the 11th Central Committee of the Chinese Communist Party, and 44 plenary sessions of the National People's Congress and the National Congress of the Chinese Communist Party, and has been known as the "safest hotel" and "the crown of meeting venues" in China.

== Overview ==
The Jingxi Hotel is located on the south side of Fuxing Road, Yangfangdian Road and Yangfangdian West Road, opposite the CCTV Color TV Center across Fuxing Road on the north side of Fuxing Road. The construction of Beijing West Hotel started in 1959 for the 10th anniversary of the People's Republic, and was completed in 1964. Because of its geographical location, Luo Ruiqing, the secretary-general of the Central Military Commission, named it Jingxi Hotel, means Beijing West Hotel. The Jingxi Hotel belongs to the military establishment, management unit formerly known as the "People's Liberation Army General Staff Department Administration Jingxi Hotel Management Office", in September 2004 changed its name to the "People's Liberation Army General Staff Department Management and Security Department of the Jingxi Hotel Management Authority". The hotel is not open to the general public.

== History ==
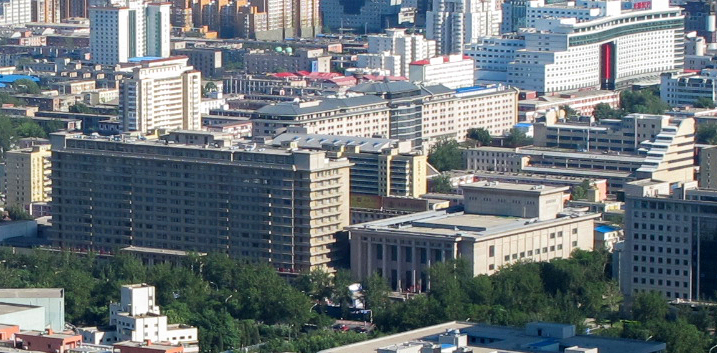
Jingxi Hotel from the air (left)

When the Beijing West Hotel was built in 1964, its architectural equipment was second only to the Beijing Hotel, Minzu Hotel, Qianmen Hotel, and Prime Hotel in Beijing. During the National Day of the People's Republic of China in 1964, the Beijing West Hotel received guests from six countries, including Algeria, Hungary, Czechoslovakia, Bulgaria, Pakistan, Burma, Myanmar, and others 6 countries' party and government delegations as well as 61 professional delegations from 34 other countries. The Jingxi Hotel also hosted the Northeast Delegation, the Central and South China Delegation, the People's Liberation Army Delegation and more than 260 staff members of the Third National People's Congress in 1964. Over the next 40 years, almost all delegations to the National People's Congress stayed at the Jingxi Hotel.

After the outbreak of the Cultural Revolution, the "Four Greats" of "Great clamor, Great release, Great debate, and Great print" spread to the People's Liberation Army for a time, and Ye Jianying, a senior officer of the People's Liberation Army, held an expanded meeting of the Military Commission at the Jingxi Hotel in Beijing on January 19, 1967, to oppose the "Four Greats" in the military. On January 19, 1967, the top military officials of the Chinese Communist Party held an enlarged meeting of the Military Commission at the Jingxi Hotel to oppose the "Four Greats" in the military, and Ye Jianying, Xu Xiangqian, Nie Rongzhen and other senior leading military cadres met with Jiang Qing and Chen Boda from the Central Cultural Revolutionary Group, where they had a heated argument and slammed the table, which was known as the "Incident of the Great Disturbance at the Jingxi Hotel" (大闹京西宾馆事件).

Other important meetings to have taken place here include the pivotal 3rd Plenum of the 11th CCP Central Committee in 1978, when China embarked on economic reforms, and the 3rd and 4th Plenums of the 18th CCP Central Committee. In the 2015 People's Republic of China military reform, the hotel's parent unit, the Department of Management and Security of the General Staff Department of the Chinese People's Liberation Army, was abolished in 2016. The hotel was transferred to the Agency for Offices Administration of the Central Military Commission.

The closest subway station is Military Museum station, on Line 1 and Line 9 of the Beijing Subway.

== See also ==
- Diaoyutai Guesthouse
- List of hotels in Beijing
- Rossiya Hotel, the defunct Soviet equivalent built during the same period.
