= Agency for Offices Administration of the Central Military Commission =

Chinese military admin support agency

- 中央军事委员会机关事务管理总局

Agency overview
- Formed: 2016
- Type: Functional department of the Central Military Commission
- Jurisdiction: People's Liberation Army
- Headquarters: Ministry of National Defense compound August 1st Building, Beijing
- Agency executive: PLAAF Maj Gen Liu Changchun, Director
- Parent department: Central Military Commission
- Website: chinamil.com.cn

Agency for Offices Administration of the Central Military Commission
- Simplified Chinese: 中央军事委员会机关事务管理总局
- Traditional Chinese: 中央軍事委員會機關事務管理總局
Transcriptions
Standard Mandarin
- Hanyu Pinyin: zhōngyāng Jūnshì Wěiyuánhuì Jīguān Shìwù Guǎnlǐ Zǒngjú

Abbreviation
- Simplified Chinese: 中央军委机关事务管理总局
- Traditional Chinese: 中央軍委會事務管理總局
Transcriptions
Standard Mandarin
- Hanyu Pinyin: Zhōngyāng Jūnwěi Jīguān Shìwù Guǎnlǐ Zǒngjú

The General Agency for Offices Administration of the Central Military Commission is a first-level functional agency under the Central Military Commission of the People's Republic of China. It was founded on January 11, 2016, under Xi Jinping's military reforms.

The agency is in charge of providing administrative support to all CMC departments and subsidiary organs. It plays a role in provisioning supplies, basic administrative support, and in particular it is in charge of managing the payment of military wages.Military Commission and the subordinate and directly subordinate units. The General Agency is located in Xicheng District, Beijing. The bureau's first director was Major General Liu Zhiming, former head of the Shenyang Military Region Joint Logistics Department.

== History ==
In March 1950, the Administration Department of the General Staff of the People's Liberation Army (PLA) was formed. In July 1954, it was included in the organization chart of the General Staff Department of the People's Liberation Army, and was renamed as the "Administration and Economy Department of the General Staff Department of the People's Liberation Army". In January 1955, the Administration Department of the General Staff began to operate under the supervision of Zhu Zaoguan, the deputy director of the General Office of the Central Military Commission (CMC). In September 1960, the General Staff Administration Department was abolished, and the Ministry of National Defense's Office Management Bureau was set up instead. In October 1963, the Ministry of National Defense Office Management Bureau was changed into the Administration Bureau of the General Staff Department, and was placed directly under the General Staff Department. In December 2003, it was expanded to become the Department of Management and Security of the General Staff of the People's Liberation Army.

In January 2016, as part of the 2015 People's Republic of China's Military Reforms, the General Agency for Offices Administration of the Central Military Commission was established. The Agency (or "General Administration") is responsible for the management and support of the organs of the Central Military Commission and its affiliated and directly subordinate units, replacing the relevant functions of the former Department of Management and Protection of the General Staff of the People's Liberation Army (PLA) and the Bureau of Directly Subordinate Work of the General Office of the Central Military Commission. The General Agency manages various ancillary functions for the CMC organs, in particular its basic financial affairs, running the main financial settlement center, and assigning financial affairs security teams to the various organs of the CMC and to various military regions. Since 2016, the General Agency has implemented a comprehensive management and services' security system for the Central Military Commission's agencies.

== Organization ==
=== Functional offices ===
- General Office (综合局)
- Financial Bureau (财务局)
- Barracks Bureau (营房局)
- Service Bureau (服务局)
- Health Bureau (卫生局)
- Hospitality Bureau (招待局)
- Engineering Contractors Management Office (工程代建管理办公室)

=== Directly subordinate units ===
- Financial Settlements Center
- Jingxi Hotel Management Bureau
- Yantai New Age Hotel (烟台新时代大厦)
- Nankou Agricultural Sideline Base (南口农副业基地) (Note: Agricultural Sideline Bases are a peculiarity of the PLA, which throughout its history emphasized the ability of the PLA to feed itself as much as possible. These bases and all other "sideline" agricultural business of the PLA have been progressively been phased out since 2015, but it is unclear if these two Beijing-based experimental bases remain as PLA going concerns as of 2024.)
- Shunyi Agricultural Sideline Base (顺义农副业基地)

== Leadership ==
Bureau Directors of the General Agency for Offices Administration

1. PLAGF Major General Liu Zhiming (刘志明) (2016 – 2018)
2. PLAAF Major General Liu Changchun (刘长春) (July 2018 – present)

CMC General Agency for Offices Administration Political Commissars:

1. PLAGF Major General Chen Jianfei (陈剑飞) (2016 – 2021)
2. PLAAF Major General Han Guoqi (韩国启) (2021 – present)

== See also ==
- Central Military Commission (China)
- State Administration of Government Offices
