= Office for Reform and Organizational Structure =

Agency of the People's Republic of China

Office for Reform and Organizational Structure of the Central Military Commission
- 中央军事委员会改革和编制办公室

Agency overview
- Type: Administrative agency
- Jurisdiction: People's Liberation Army
- Headquarters: Ministry of National Defense compound ("August 1st Building"), Beijing
- Agency executives: Du Ke, chairman of committee; He Renxue, Li Hanjun, Zhang Yu, The twe chairman of committee
- Parent department: Central Military Commission
- Website: chinamil.com.cn

The Office for Reform and Organizational Structure of the Central Military Commission (CMC OROS) (Chinese: 中央军事委员会改革和编制办公室) is a first-level functional organ of the Central Military Commission of the People's Republic of China, of corps grade. It was founded on January 11, 2016, under Xi Jinping's military reforms. Lt. Gen. Qin Shengxiang served as its first director.

== Leadership ==
Director

- Qin Shengxiang (秦生祥) PLAGF Lt Gen (2016–2017)
- Zhong Zhaojun (钟绍军) PLAGF Lt Gen (2017–present)

Deputy Director

- He Renxue (何仁学) PLAGF Maj Gen（2016—Apr 2020）
- Li Hanjun (李汉军) PLAN Rear Adm（2016年—）
- Zhang Yu (张宇) PLAGF Maj Gen（2016年—）

== See also ==
- Central Military Commission (China)
- 2015 People's Republic of China military reform
