= Political Work Department of the Central Military Commission =

Political office of the Chinese armed forces

- 中央军委政治工作部

Agency overview
- Preceding agency: People's Liberation Army General Political Department
- Type: Functional department of the Central Military Commission
- Jurisdiction: People's Liberation Army
- Headquarters: Ministry of National Defense compound ("August 1st Building"), Beijing
- Agency executives: Chen Demin, Director; (Acting); Wang Chengnan, Zhang Yutang, Xiong Zhaoyuan, Deputy Director
- Parent department: Central Military Commission
- Child agency: China Association for International Friendly Contact
- Website: chinamil.com.cn

The Political Work Department of the Central Military Commission (Chinese: 中央军委政治工作部) is the chief political organ under the Central Military Commission (CMC). It was created in January 2016 following the military reforms under CMC chairman Xi Jinping. Its predecessor was the General Political Department of the People's Liberation Army.

The department leads all political and cultural activities in the People's Liberation Army. Lieutenant General Chen Demin currently serves as the acting director. Its deputies are Wang Chengnan, Zhang Yutang and Xiong Zhaoyuan.

The Political Work Department's Liaison Department controls a United Front organization called the China Association for International Friendly Contact (CAIFC) that is active in overseas intelligence gathering and influence operations.

== History ==
In November 2015 the General Political Department of the PLA was abolished and was replaced with the CMC Political Work Department as part of Chairman Xi Jinping's military reforms. Its role is to integrate the CCP and its ideology and propaganda into the People's Liberation Army. In January 2016, the Political Work Department became official.

== Organization ==
After the 2015 reforms and the winding down of cultural units in 2018, the PWD structure was as follows:

=== Internal offices ===
- General Office (办公厅)
- Organization Bureau (组织局)
- Cadres Bureau (干部局)
- Enlisted and Civilian Personnel Bureau (兵员和文职人员局)
- Civilian Personnel Bureau (文职人员局)
- Propaganda Bureau (宣传局)
- Internet and Public Opinion Bureau (网络舆论局)
- Directly Subordinate Units Work Bureau (直属工作局)
- Mass Work Bureau (群众工作局)
- Liaison Bureau (联络局)
- Retired Cadres Bureau (老干部局)

=== Directly subordinate units ===
- PLA News Media Center (中国人民解放军新闻传播中心)
  - People's Liberation Army Daily (《解放军报》)
- PLA Culture and Arts Center (中国人民解放军文化艺术中心)
  - August First Film Studio
- Military Museum of the Chinese People's Revolution (中国人民革命军事博物馆)
- Central Military Band of the People's Liberation Army of China (中国人民解放军军乐队)

== Leaders ==
Name	Took office	Left office	Notes
Zhang Yang (张阳)	November 2015	August 2017	
Miao Hua (苗华)	August 2017	June 2025	
Chen Demin (陈德民)	December 2025		

== See also ==
- Chinese information operations and information warfare
- Central Leading Group for Military Reform
- General Political Warfare Bureau – analogous institution of the Republic of China
- Political warfare
- The Party commands the gun
