= Qin Shengxiang =

Chinese admiral (born 1957)

- 秦生祥

Political Commissar of the People's Liberation Army Navy
- In office September 2017 – January 2022
- Commander: Shen Jinlong
- Preceded by: Miao Hua
- Succeeded by: Yuan Huazhi

Director of the General Office of the Central Military Commission
- In office October 2012 – August 2017
- Preceded by: Wang Guanzhong
- Succeeded by: Zhong Shaojun

Personal details
- Born: February 1957 (age 69) Jianli, Hubei, China
- Party: Chinese Communist Party

Military service
- Allegiance: China
- Branch/service: People's Liberation Army Navy
- Years of service: 1977−2022
- Rank: Admiral

Qin Shengxiang (Chinese: 秦生祥; born February 1957) is an admiral of the Chinese People's Liberation Army Navy (PLAN) who was the Political Commissar of the PLA Navy from September 2017 to January 2022. He formerly served as Director of the General Office of the Central Military Commission.

== Career ==
Qin Shengxiang was born in February 1957 in Jianli, Hubei Province. He worked for many years in the Central Military Commission, and served as Vice Director and then Director of the Organization Department of the PLA General Political Department. He attained the rank of major general in about 2007.

In December 2012, Qin was appointed Director of the General Office of the Central Military Commission, succeeding Wang Guanzhong. He was promoted to the rank of lieutenant general in July 2015. After Central Military Commission chairman Xi Jinping's military reform in January 2016, Qin also served as the first Director of the newly established Office for Reform and Organizational Structure.

In September 2017, Qin was appointed Political Commissar of the People's Liberation Army Navy, replacing Admiral Miao Hua. In October 2017, he was elected as a member of the 19th Central Committee of the Chinese Communist Party.

Military offices
Preceded by Chai Shaoliang	Director of the Organization Department of the PLA General Political Department; 2011–2012	Succeeded by Fang Xiang
Preceded by Wang Guanzhong	Director of the General Office of the Central Military Commission; 2012–2017	Succeeded by Zhong Shaojun
New title	Director of the Office for Reform and Organizational Structure; 2015–2017	Succeeded by Zhong Shaojun
Preceded by Miao Hua	Political Commissar of the People's Liberation Army Navy; 2017–2022	Succeeded by Liu Qingsong
