= Zhong Shaojun =

Chinese politician (born 1968)

- 钟绍军

Political Commissar of the People's Liberation Army National Defense University
- In office March 2024 – October 2025
- CMC Chairman: Xi Jinping
- Preceded by: Zheng He
- Succeeded by: Xia Zhihe

Director of the General Office of the Central Military Commission
- In office August 2017 – March 2024
- Preceded by: Qin Shengxiang
- Succeeded by: Fang Yongxiang

Director of the Office of the Chairman of the Central Military Commission
- In office June 2013 – March 2024
- CMC Chairman: Xi Jinping
- Preceded by: Wu Zhiming
- Succeeded by: Fang Yongxiang

Personal details
- Born: 19 October 1968 (age 58) Kaihua County, Zhejiang, China
- Party: Chinese Communist Party (expelled in 2026)
- Education: Hangzhou University; Zhejiang University; Tsinghua University

Military service
- Allegiance: China
- Branch/service: People's Liberation Army
- Years of service: 2013 − 2026 (expelled)
- Rank: Lieutenant general
- Commands: CMC General Office CMC Office for Reform and Organizational Structure

Zhong Shaojun (Chinese: 钟绍军; born 19 October 1968) is a former Chinese politician and general who was a long-time political aide of Xi Jinping, the General Secretary of the Chinese Communist Party (CCP) and the Chairman of the Central Military Commission (CMC).

Zhong served on Xi's staff beginning in Zhejiang province, then followed him to Shanghai, and then Beijing. Zhong served as the director of CMC Chairman's Office from June 2013 to March 2024 and director of the General Office of the Central Military Commission from August 2017 to March 2024. He was appointed as the Political Commissar of the People's Liberation Army National Defense University in March 2024, where he served until October 2025. In October 2026, he was expelled from the CCP.

== Early life ==
Zhong was born in Kaihua County, Zhejiang, near the modern city of Quzhou, on 19 October 1968. He graduated from Hangzhou University in 1990 with a bachelor's degree in Computer Applications and from Zhejiang University in 1999 with a master's degree in Applied Psychology.

== Career ==
He once served as the deputy head of the provincial party's Organization Department in Zhejiang. It is not clear when Zhong began working for Xi, but evidence suggests that Zhong was on Xi's staff at least as early as when Xi was serving as the Communist Party Secretary of Zhejiang province. He worked as Xi's personal secretary in 2002. In Zhejiang, Zhong often drafted Xi's official statements. Upon the sacking of Chen Liangyu due to a corruption scandal in 2006, the central authorities selected Xi to fill the position vacated by Chen as party chief of Shanghai. The transfer elevated Xi from a relatively unknown provincial administrator to the front runner to succeed Hu Jintao as the next leader of the Communist Party.

Zhong then followed Xi to Shanghai and took on the title of Deputy Director of the General Office of the Shanghai Municipal Party Committee In March 2007, and often accompanied Xi on visits. When Xi was transferring his duties to his successor as Zhejiang party chief Zhao Hongzhu, Zhong would frequently accompany Xi on trips between Shanghai and Hangzhou. It was said that on some trips, Zhong was the only person accompanying Xi. In October 2007, Xi was transferred to Beijing to become a member of the Politburo Standing Committee and the secretary of the Secretariat of the Chinese Communist Party. Zhong was promptly also transferred to Beijing to work for the General Office of the Chinese Communist Party. He became the head of the Political Group of the Research Office of the General Office. Upon arriving in Beijing, Zhong also enrolled in a doctorate program at the prestigious Tsinghua University, some say he was admitted with the help of then Tsinghua party chief and friend Chen Xi.

In 2013, following Xi Jinping's ascension to power, Zhong became the deputy director of the CCP General Office and director of the Office of the Chairman of the Central Military Commission. On 11 June 2013, Zhong was seen in military uniform (with the rank insignia of a senior colonel) on national television watching the launch of the Shenzhou 10 spacecraft at the Jiuquan Satellite Launch Centre accompanying Xi Jinping. Zhong's relationship with Xi has been compared to that between former General Secretary Jiang Zemin and his former secretary Jia Ting'an (later promoted to General in the People's Liberation Army) and that between former General Secretary Hu Jintao and his chief aide Ling Jihua. However, there is not much publicly available information about Zhong or about his relationship with Xi Jinping. He has additionally been named as a member of the "New Zhijiang Army", that is, a trusted lieutenant of Xi Jinping who shares Xi's political philosophies and who may become an important political player or be destined for higher office in the near future.

In 2016, he was promoted to become a major general. In August 2017, he became the director of the General Office of the Central Military Commission. He was promoted to the military rank of Lieutenant general in December 2019. Following the 20th CCP National Congress in October 2022, he was elected as a member of the 20th Central Committee. He became commissar of the People's Liberation Army National Defense University in June 2024. In April 2025 Zhong was quietly reassigned to a military school job from the more powerful job of being Xi's secretary and speechwriter. In October 2025 he stepped down as Political Commissar of the PLA National Defense University, replaced by Vice Admiral Xia Zhihe.

== Downfall ==
On 28 August 2026, the Standing Committee of the National People's Congress removed Zhong as a delegate to the 14th National People's Congress. On 29 October 2026, the fifth plenary session of the 20th CCP Central Committee reviewed and approved the report of the Discipline Inspection Commission of the Central Military Commission on the "serious violations of discipline and law" by Zhong and confirmed the Politburo decision to expel him from the CCP.
