= The Party leads everything =

Chinese Communist Party slogan

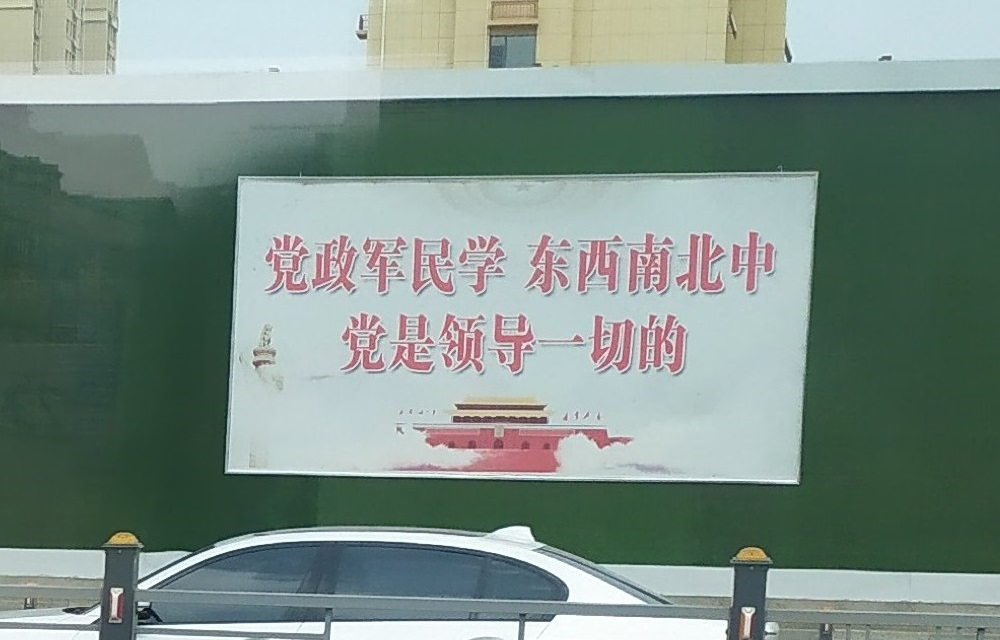
A sign on the streets of Yantai City, Shandong, reads "The Party leads everything, including the Party, government, military, people, and education, in the east, west, north, south, and center."

The Party leads everything (Chinese: 党领导一切; pinyin: Dǎng lǐngdǎo yīqiè) is a political slogan used by the Chinese Communist Party (CCP) to signify its absolute leadership over the People's Republic of China (PRC), Chinese social organizations, and all aspects of society.

== History ==
A similar phrase was first used during the Second Sino-Japanese War. On 1 September 1942, the Politburo of the CCP passed the "Decision of the CCP Central Committee on Unifying the Party Leadership in the Anti-Japanese Base Areas and Adjusting the Relationship between Various Organizations", which stated: "The Party is the vanguard of the proletariat and the highest form of proletarian organization. It should lead all other organizations, such as the army, government and mass organizations."

The phrase was used during the leadership of Chairman Mao Zedong. At the Seven Thousand Cadres Conference in 1962, Mao said "of the seven areas of industry, agriculture, commerce, education, military, government, and the Party, the Party leads everything. The Party must lead industry, agriculture, commerce, culture and education, the military, and the government".

In December 1973, Mao Zedong said at a Politburo meeting he chaired: "The Politburo is in charge of everything, including the Party, government, military, people, and education, as well as the east, west, south, north, and center." The term was downplayed under the leadership of Deng Xiaoping. At the 12th Party National Congress in 1982, the CCP constitution deleted the phrase and replaced it with "the party mainly leads politics, ideology, and the organization". The phrase was revived under the general secretaryship of Xi Jinping. At the 19th Party National Congress in 2017, Xi said:

Chinese: 党政军民学，东西南北中，党是领导一切的

[Party, government, military, civilian, and academic, north, south, east, west, and center, the Party leads everything.]

— Xi Jinping

The phrase was incorporated to the CCP constitution during the 2017 party congress. Under Xi Jinping's general secretaryship, an increasing share of laws passed by the National People's Congress explicitly affirmed the leadership of the CCP, with the share increasing from 4% in 2018 to nearly 70% in 2024. According to the 2020 Law on Governmental Sanctions for Public Employees, any public employee, including civil servants, that publish "articles, speeches, declarations, and statements opposing the State’s guiding ideologies established in the Constitution, the leadership of the Communist Party, the socialist system, or the reform and opening up" are to be automatically dismissed from office.

== See also ==
- The Party commands the gun
