= Wang Bingzhang (general) =

Chinese general (1914–2005)

- 王秉璋
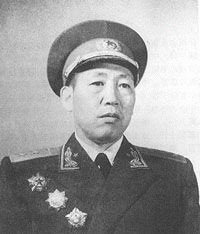
- Wang in 1955

1st Minister of the Seventh Ministry of Machine Building
- In office 1965–1971
- Preceded by: New position
- Succeeded by: Wang Yang

1st Chief of Staff of the PLA Air Force
- In office 1949–1958
- Preceded by: New position
- Succeeded by: Zhang Tingfa

Personal details
- Born: 14 January 1914 Anyang, Henan, China
- Died: 25 September 2005 (aged 91) Beijing, China
- Party: CCP

Military service
- Allegiance: China
- Branch/service: Northwest Army; Chinese Red Army; Eighth Route Army; PLA Air Force
- Years of service: 1929−1982
- Rank: Lieutenant general
- Battles/wars: Second Sino-Japanese War; Chinese Civil War; Korean War

Chinese name
- Chinese: 王秉璋
Transcriptions
Standard Mandarin
- Hanyu Pinyin: Wáng Bǐngzhāng
- Wade–Giles: Wang Ping-chang

Wang Bingzhang (Chinese: 王秉璋; 14 January 1914 – 25 September 2005) was a Chinese Communist revolutionary and a founding lieutenant general of the People's Liberation Army (PLA). He joined the Northwest Army of the warlord Feng Yuxiang in 1929, before participating in the Ningdu uprising and defecting to the Communist Red Army in 1931. He fought in the Red Army's Long March, the Second Sino-Japanese War where he was credited with devising a trench warfare tactic that helped destroy enemy pillboxes, and the Chinese Civil War.

After the founding of the People's Republic of China in 1949, Wang served as the first chief of staff of the PLA Air Force and then the first Minister of the Seventh Ministry of Machine Building, in charge of China's ballistic missile program. During the Cultural Revolution, he replaced Marshall Nie Rongzhen as the acting director of the Science and Technology Commission of the National Defense Ministry, in charge of China's nuclear tests and the launch of its first satellite. However, in the aftermath of Marshall Lin Biao's alleged coup attempt and subsequent death in October 1971, Wang was purged and imprisoned for ten years. He was released in 1981 and discharged from the army without being prosecuted or convicted of a crime.

== Early life and Guominjun ==
Wang Bingzhang was born on 14 January 1914 into a peasant family in Anyang, Henan Province. Owing to poverty, he dropped out of school second year in junior high school and apprenticed at a blacksmith's shop.

In September 1929, Wang enlisted in the Guominjun (Northwest Army) of the warlord Feng Yuxiang and trained as a radio operator. After Chiang Kai-shek defeated Feng in the Central Plains War in 1930, Chiang took over the Guominjun, reorganized it as the 26th Route Army, and dispatched it to Jiangxi to participate in the third encirclement campaign against the Jiangxi Soviet. On 14 December 1931, the 26th Army rebelled against Chiang in the Ningdu uprising and defected to the Chinese Red Army. It became the Fifth Army Group of the Red Army, greatly strengthening the Communist forces. Wang joined the Communist Youth League in 1932 and the Communist Party in 1935. He served in the Fifth and later the First Army Group of the Red Army, and participated in the army's Long March to Northern Shaanxi.

== Second Sino-Japanese War ==
During the Second Sino-Japanese War, Wang served in the 115th Division of the Eighth Route Army commanded by Lin Biao, and fought in the battles of Pingxingguan, Guangyang, Wucheng, and Jinggou. In 1939 his division was deployed in Shandong to set up a guerrilla base in the Japanese-occupied province. After September 1940, he became acting commander of the Third Brigade and then commander of the Fourth Brigade in charge of the 11th military subdistrict.

In December 1942, Wang was appointed commander of the Fourth Brigade and of the Communist base in Huxi (湖西), located southwest of Shandong. The area was under frequent attacks from the Japanese, the pro-Japanese Wang Jingwei regime, and the Kuomintang forces. Wang devised the jiaotonghao (交通壕) tactic using a network of interconnected trenches from which to attack the enemies' pillbox system. In the "Anti-Pillbox Battle" in July 1943, Wang's brigade, by using his tactic, reportedly inflicted nearly 10,000 enemy casualties while losing around 100 men. Mao Zedong later personally praised Wang for his performance in Shandong. In late 1944, Wang led three regiments of the Eighth Route Army south to support the New Fourth Army. He made a report on his trench tactic, which was circulated by the Fourth Division of the New Fourth Army as a booklet titled Jiaotonghao Attacks (交通壕攻击). Zhang Zhen, chief of staff of the Fourth Division, wrote its preface and praised jiaotonghao as an innovative and effective tactic.

== Chinese Civil War ==
The Second Sino-Japanese War ended with the surrender of Japan in 1945; Civil War soon resumed between the Kuomintang and the Communists. During the war, Wang successively served as deputy commander and chief of staff of the Hebei-Shandong-Henan Military District, commander of the district, commander of the 11th Column, and commander of the 17th Corps of the Second Field Army, participating in many battles including the Huaihai Campaign and the Yangtze River Crossing Campaign. His anti-pillbox jiaotonghao tactic was widely propagated in the People's Liberation Army (PLA) and was credited with helping the PLA win many battles, including the sieges of Yixian and Jinzhou in the Liaoshen Campaign, the battles against Huang Baitao, Huang Wei, and Du Yuming in the Huaihai Campaign, and the Battle of Tianjin in the Pingjin Campaign.

== Early People's Republic of China ==
After the founding of the People's Republic of China in 1949, Wang assisted commander Liu Yalou with the establishment of the People's Liberation Army Air Force (PLAAF), as its first chief of staff. In 1951, he accompanied Xu Xiangqian to Moscow to negotiate with the Soviet Union for the purchase of the MiG-15 fighter planes. In 1953, he was the first-ranked deputy commander of the PLAAF. During the Korean War, when the PLAAF suffered high casualties in May 1953, Wang was tasked with analyzing and rescuing the situation.

In 1955, Wang was among the first group of PLA commanders to be awarded the rank of lieutenant general. In April 1960, he was appointed deputy director of the Fifth Academy of the Ministry of National Defense, which was in charge of China's embryonic ballistic missile and satellite programs and, later, promoted to director. When the Fifth Academy was reorganized into the Seventh Ministry of Machine Building (the "missile ministry") in January 1965, Chairman Liu Shaoqi appointed Wang as the inaugural minister; his six deputies included the famed scientist Qian Xuesen. Under Wang's command, China successfully launched its first missile, the Dongfeng-1, in November 1960, and the Dongfeng-2 to Dongfeng-5 followed.

== Cultural Revolution ==
When the Cultural Revolution erupted in 1966, Wang came under attack by the radical 16 September or 916 Group of the Red Guards. On 23 January 1967, the 916 Group, under young engineer Ye Zhengguang, launched a coup in the Seventh Ministry. Wang refused Ye's demand to surrender the Ministry's official seals, the symbols of its authority, but the rebels used a blowtorch to cut open the safety box where the seals were kept and ousted Wang.

Wang avoided serious repercussions, likely due to the protection by the pro-establishment New 15 September Group and by Marshall Nie Rongzhen, director of the Science and Technology Commission of the National Defense Ministry (NDSTC). He was rescued after being held by various Red Guard factions for four months and suddenly disappeared, ostensibly being hospitalized for medical treatment. He did not re-emerge until October 1968.

After Nie himself was purged in 1968, Mao Zedong appointed Wang as the acting director of the NDSTC. In this role, he commanded ten nuclear tests in Northwest China. In April 1970, China's first satellite, the Dong Fang Hong I, was successfully placed in orbit by the Long March 1 rocket, which was based on the design of the Dongfeng-4.

In October 1971, however, Wang was purged in the wake of Marshal Lin Biao's alleged coup attempt and subsequent death. He was labeled a "sworn follower" of Lin and imprisoned.

== Later life and death ==
Wang was held in the Qincheng Prison from 1971 until his release in 1981. In 1982, the Procuratorate of the People's Liberation Army announced that it would not press charges against him but discharged him from the PLA. He died on 25 September 2005 in Beijing, at the age of 91. Because of a dispute between his family and the Chinese government regarding the official treatment of his funeral, his body remained frozen in the hospital morgue for 12 years. His funeral was finally held on 31 May 2017 at the People's Liberation Army General Hospital (301 Hospital) in Beijing.

== Honours ==
In 1955, Wang was awarded the Second Class Medal of the Order of Bayi, the First Class Medal of the Order of Independence and Freedom, and the First Class Medal of the Order of Liberation.
