= Audit Office of the Central Military Commission =

Chinese military auditor general

- 中央军事委员会审计署

Agency overview
- Formed: 11 January 2016
- Jurisdiction: People's Liberation Army
- Headquarters: Ministry of National Defense compound ("August 1st Building"), Beijing
- Agency executive: Sun Bin, Director
- Parent department: Central Military Commission

The Audit Office of the Central Military Commission is an audit agency under the Central Military Commission of the People's Republic of China. It was founded on 11 January 2016, under Xi Jinping's military reforms. It is responsible for auditing People's Liberation Army and People's Armed Police Its current director is Major General Sun Bin.

== See also ==
- Central Military Commission (China)
- National Audit Office (China)
