= Peace disease =

Peace disease (Chinese: 和平病) is a supposed problem with China generally and the People's Liberation Army in particular, in which the nation is weakened by a lack of combat experience.

General Secretary of the Chinese Communist Party Xi Jinping declared peace disease a threat in March 2018, and People's Liberation Army Daily used the phrase in a July piece interpreted as reflecting policy.

The concept has been called "the most important" Chinese military doctrine for defense analysts to understand, that "goes to the heart of the Chinese Communist Party's worries about the PLA's capability". The Conversation said that this term, and others reflecting internal criticism of the PLA, are "curiously absent" from publications intended for non-Chinese audiences.

== See also ==
- 2015 People's Republic of China military reform
