= Hu Wei =

Hu Wei may refer to:

- Hu Wei (general) (胡炜; 1920–2018), Chinese general
- Hu Wei (director) (胡伟; born 1983), Chinese film director
- Hu Wei (politician) (胡伟; born 1962), former vice-chairman of Xinjiang, alumnus of the Graduate School of Chinese Academy of Social Sciences
- Hu Wei (footballer) (胡伟 (足球运动员); born 1983), Chinese football player
