= Wang Bingzhang =

Wang Bingzhang may refer to:

- Wang Bingzhang (general) (王秉璋; 1914–2005), Chinese general
- Wang Bingzhang (dissident) (王炳章; born 1947), Chinese dissident
