= Guan Youfei =

Chinese admiral

- 关友飞
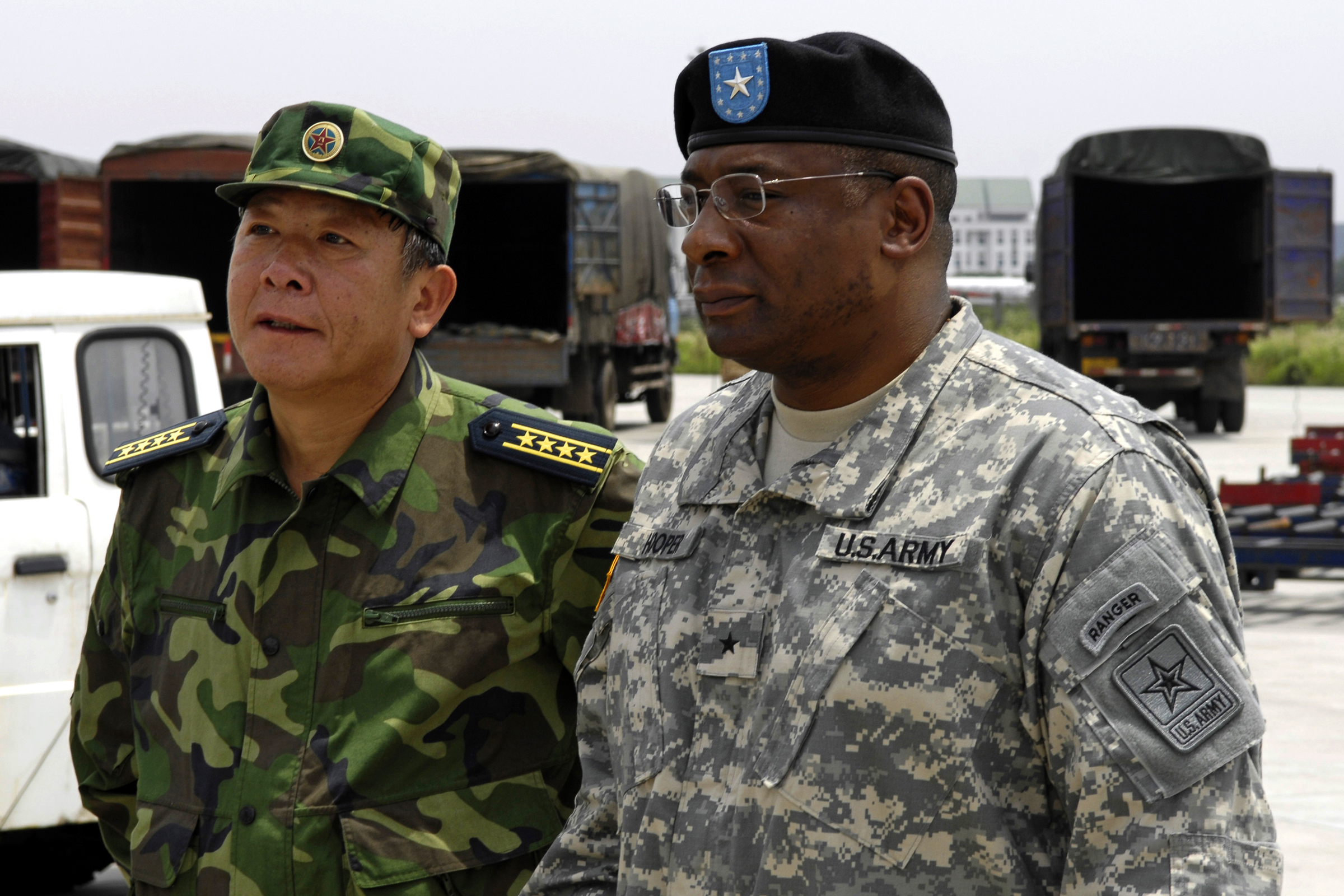
- U.S. Army Brig. Gen. Charles W. Hopper (right), defense attache at the United States Embassy Beijing, observes relief operations with Senior Captain Guan Youfei, deputy director for the Chinese Defense Ministry's foreign affairs office in 2008.

Director of the Central Military Commission's International Military Cooperation Office
- In office 15 January 2016 – 2017
- Preceded by: New title
- Succeeded by: Hu Changming

Director of the Ministry of National Defence Foreign Affairs Office
- In office February 2013 – January 2016
- Preceded by: Qian Lihua
- Succeeded by: Hu Changping

Personal details
- Born: 1957 (age 68–69) Wuzhou, Guangxi, China
- Party: Chinese Communist Party
- Education: The High School Affiliated To Beijing Normal University; Dalian Naval Academy

Military service
- Allegiance: People's Republic of China
- Branch/service: People's Liberation Army Navy
- Years of service: 1976-present
- Rank: Rear Admiral

Guan Youfei (simplified Chinese: 关友飞; traditional Chinese: 關友飛; pinyin: Guān Yǒufēi; born 1957) is a rear admiral (shaojiang) of the People's Liberation Army Navy (PLAN) of China. He has been director of the Office for International Military Cooperation of the Central Military Commission since January 2016.

== Biography ==
Guan Youfei was born in 1957 in Wuzhou, Guangxi. In 1975 he graduated from The High School Affiliated To Beijing Normal University. He was conscripted into military service in 1976, during the end of the Cultural Revolution. He served in various posts in the navy ship force before studying at Dalian Naval Academy. In 2008, he was appointed deputy director of the Ministry of National Defence Foreign Affairs Office, and five years later promoted to the Director position. Guan Youfei was promoted to the rank of rear admiral (shaojiang) in 2009. On January 15, 2016, he became director of the newly established Office for International Military Cooperation of the Central Military Commission, after China's reform of national defense and the army.

Military offices
| Preceded by Qian Lihua | Director of the Office for International Military Cooperation of the Defense Ministry; 2013–2016 | Succeeded by Hu Changming |
| New title | Director of the Office for International Military Cooperation of the Central Military Commission; 2016–2017 | Succeeded by Hu Changming |
