= The Party commands the gun =

Chinese Communist Party policy and slogan

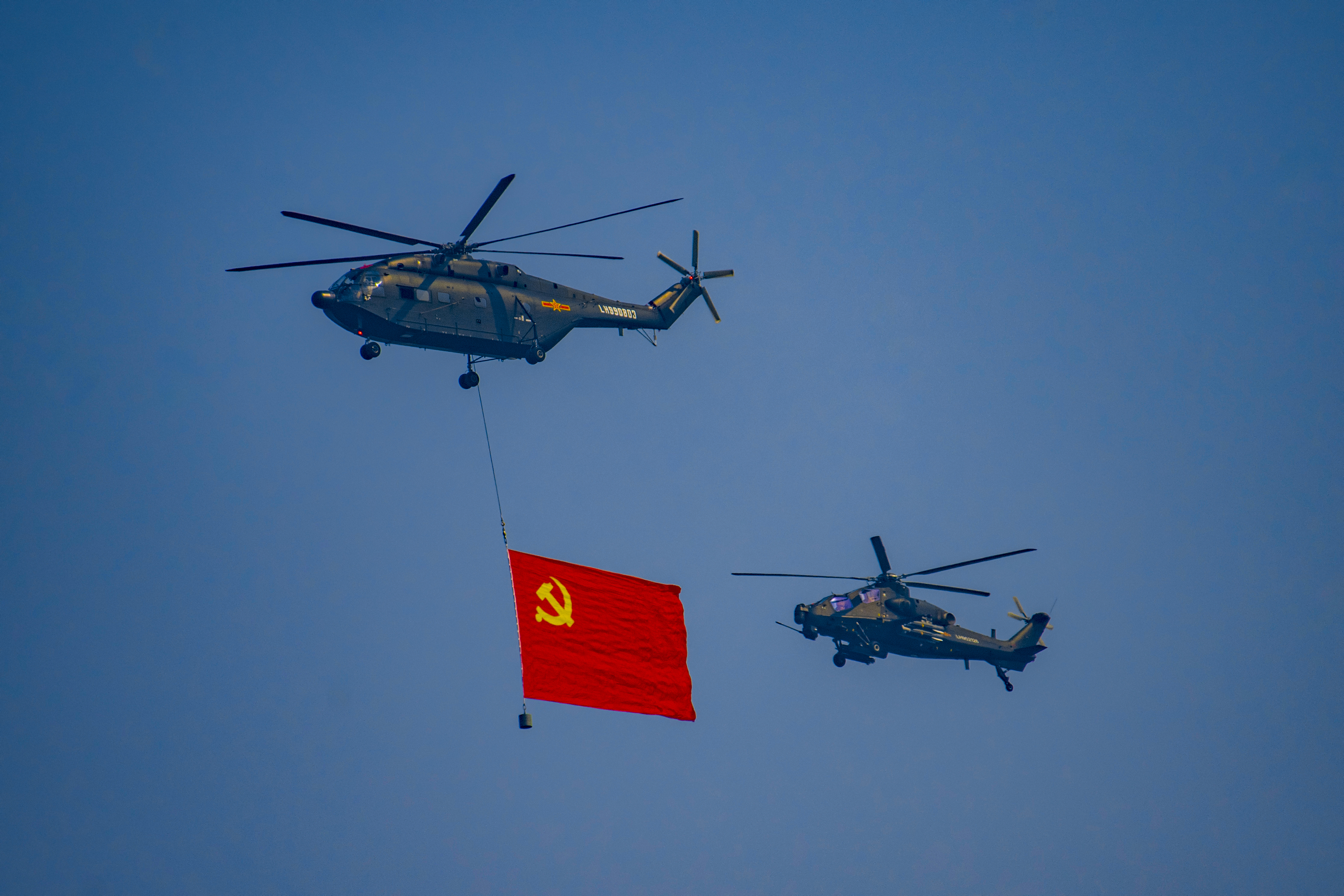
- A People's Liberation Army Changhe Z-8 carrying the flag of the Chinese Communist Party during a military parade marking the 70th anniversary of the People's Republic of China on 1 October 2019.
- Simplified Chinese: 党指挥枪
Transcriptions
Standard Mandarin
- Hanyu Pinyin: Dǎng zhǐhuī qiāng

"The Party commands the gun" is a slogan of the Chinese Communist Party (CCP) to emphasize its core policy of absolute control of the People's Liberation Army (PLA).

The phrase was first used by CCP leader Mao Zedong in his 1938 article Problems of War and Strategy. The original text reads "Our principle is that the Party commands the gun, and we will never allow the gun to command the Party." Mao believed that the Chinese Communist Party could not achieve revolution through solely peaceful means. He also mentioned that during the First United Front with the Kuomintang, the CCP "ignored the struggle for the army and focused one-sidedly on the mass movement", leading it to be suppressed after the split with the Kuomintang. Mao then used the example of the Kuomintang controlling the army to illustrate that the CCP should "derive political power from the barrel of a gun" and put forward the principle of "the Party commands the gun, but never allows the gun to command the Party".

The CCP continues to uphold the party's absolute control over the military and views the military as a tool for maintaining political power, that is, "consolidating political power with the barrel of a gun", and opposes the nationalization of the military. The CCP controls the PLA through its Central Military Commission, which has been led by the general secretary of the CCP Central Committee since 1989. The CCP also maintains a political commissar system to ensure political loyalty to the Party, and requires the PLA to undergo political education.

== History ==
Mao Zedong believed that the CCP could not win the revolutionary struggle through peaceful means, and that during the first cooperation between the Kuomintang and the CCP, it neglected the struggle for the army and focused one-sidedly on the mass movement, which led to armed suppression. Therefore, it was determined that the CCP must establish an army under the sole leadership of the party.

Afterwards, the Autumn Harvest Uprising suffered a serious setback, resulting in heavy casualties and demoralization. Mao Zedong, the leader of the uprising, reorganized the remaining personnel in Sanwan Village (Sanwan Reorganization) and implemented the "branch establishment in the company", thus realizing the party's direct control over the grassroots and soldiers from an organizational perspective. He once concluded in his article "The Struggle in Jinggangshan" on November 25, 1928, that the reason why the Chinese Red Army fought hard and did not disband was that "the branch was established in the company."

During the Long March, Zhang Guotao and Mao Zedong relied on military power to try to compete for the leadership of the CCP Central Committee. The CCP Central Committee split into two due to the disagreement between going north and going south. Later, Zhang Guotao, who suffered heavy casualties during the southward march, was ordered by the Communist International to cancel his "Second Central Committee". Mao stated in his article "Problems of War and Strategy" on November 6, 1938: "Communists do not fight for personal military power, but they must fight for the military power of the party and the people. Our principle is that the party commands the gun, and we will never allow the gun to command the party."

After the outbreak of the Second Sino-Japanese War, the KMT and the CCP formed the Second United Front. The Nationalist government led by the KMT demanded that the CCP surrender its army and give up its military power. It also sent Kang Ze to the Eighth Route Army as deputy director of the Political Department, but was rejected by Mao Zedong. Within the party, Wang Ming advocated "establishing a unified national defense army". Mao Zedong therefore emphasized that the Communist Party would not allow the Red Army and all guerrilla forces to waver on the principle of "absolute independent leadership of the Communist Party". Based on this, the CCP restored the system of political commissars in the army and the name of the Political Department.

== Description ==
The Chinese Communist Party upholds the party's absolute control over the military and views the military as a tool for maintaining its political power. The CCP strongly opposes the nationalization of the military (Chinese: 军队国家化), meaning separating the military from Party leadership.

The CCP requires the PLA to undergo political education, instilling CCP ideology in its members. Additionally, China maintains a political commissar system. Regiment-level and higher units maintain CCP committees and political commissars. Additionally, battalion-level and company-level units respectively maintain political directors and political instructors. The political commissars are officially equal to commanders in status. The political commissars are officially responsible for the implementation of party committee decisions, instilling and maintaining party discipline, providing political education, and working with other components of the political work system. Political commissars report to higher-level party committees, rather than military commanders.

=== Legal basis and implementation ===
The absolute control of the CCP over the military is guaranteed by a series of core systems, including: the highest leadership and command of the military is concentrated in the Central Committee of the Party and the Central Military Commission, the military party committee system, the political commissar system, and the political organ system. The CCP practices a strict division of power in military affairs between the Politburo and the CMC; no civilian Politburo member is authorized to handle military affairs except for the CMC chairman, while military personnel are forbidden to intervene in civilian affairs. The CMC also implements a chairman responsibility system to guarantee the CMC chairman's absolute leadership over the Central Military Commission.

Article 21 of the 1997 Law of the People's Republic of China on National Defense states that armed forces of the People's Republic of China are "subject to the leadership of the Chinese Communist Party". Article 4 of Chapter 1 of the 2010 Regulations on Political Work of the People's Liberation Army stipulates that "The Chinese People's Liberation Army must be placed under the absolute leadership of the Chinese Communist Party. Its highest leadership and command authority belongs to the Central Committee of the Chinese Communist Party and the Central Military Commission."

== Assessments ==
Regarding the CCP's absolute control over the military, American academic Andrew Mertha stated that "...what strengthens the party also weakens some of China's instruments of power. Senior military commands sit vacant or are staffed by less experienced officers, and future officers learn that the safest career record is a thin one. When forced to choose, political control is always more important to the party than operational effectiveness. This is a tradeoff that the party has been willing to make for a century..."

Some analysts have noted that some military applications of artificial intelligence could pose challenges to and may eventually degrade the CCP's absolute control of the military. Some have contended that the PRC's increasing launch on warning posture of its nuclear arsenal empowers the People's Liberation Army Rocket Force to a greater degree due to compressed decision-making timelines and could also potentially degrade the CCP's absolute control of the military.

== See also ==
- Civil control of the military
- Civilian control of the military in communist states
