= Civil service of China =

The civil service of the People's Republic of China is the administrative system of the government which consists of all levels who run the day-to-day affairs in the country. The members of the civil service are selected through competitive examination.

== Civil servants ==
As of 2009, China has about 10 million civil servants who are managed under the Civil Service Law. Most civil servants work in government agencies and departments. State leaders and cabinet members, who normally would be considered politicians in political systems with competing political parties and elections, also come under the civil service in China. Civil servants are not necessarily members of the Chinese Communist Party (CCP), but 95 percent of civil servants in leading positions from division (county) level and above are CCP cadres. The vast majority of civil servants remain in the service for their entire careers.

The definition of civil servant (Chinese: 公务员; pinyin: gōngwùyuán), a term formally codified in the 2006 Civil Service Law is often ambiguous in China. Most broadly, civil servants in China are a subset of CCP cadres, the class of professional staff who administer and manage Chinese government, party, military, and major business institutions. More specifically, the term denotes public employees in higher positions of authority; according to academic Yuen Yuen Ang, they "form the elite strata of functionaries in the party-state hierarchy", in contrast to shiye renyuan (事业人员) or 'shiye' personnel, who are also public employees but are not considered gongwuyuan.

The definition of the civil service differs from that of many western countries. Civil servants are "the managers, administrators and professionals who work for government bodies," including leadership such as the Premier, state councillors, ministers, and provincial governors, among others. It excludes manual workers and many other types of cadre, such as those employed in public service units such as hospitals, universities, or state-owned enterprises, even though those positions are also paid and managed by the government. While not strictly part of the civil service, the judiciary is governed by the same personnel arrangements as the civil service.

== History ==
A professional corps of dedicated bureaucrats, akin to a modern civil service, has been an integral feature of governance in Chinese civilization for much of its history. Part of the motivation was ideological; Confucian teaching discouraged overly involved, warlike, and rowdy rulers alike, making the delegation of legislative and executive authority particularly necessary. During the Zhou dynasty (c. 1046 – 256 BC), records show that kings would send edicts encouraging local officials to identify promising candidates for office in the capital. This practice was intensified under Emperor Wu of Han (r. 141 – 87 BC), who standardized the selection process with the addition of question-and-answer elements on classic texts judged by a panel of scholars. This helped lay the groundwork for the Imperial examination system that would be formed under the short-lived Sui dynasty before being widely adopted thereafter. The examination system and the bureaucracy it engendered would remain in place in some form until the dissolution of the Qing dynasty in 1911.

=== Mao-era cadres ===
The People's Republic of China did not initially maintain a formal civil service like other countries of the era. As the CCP gained ground in the Chinese Civil War against the Kuomintang (KMT), it instead used dedicated CCP cadres to oversee and administer territories it took over. The CCP, at the time of its victory in 1949, faced a serious shortage of qualified personnel to the fill over 2.7 million public positions needed to govern the country that had previously been occupied by KMT-affiliated officials, some of whom the CCP had to allow to continue to work due to lack of suitable replacements. By the mid-1950s, China had developed a nomenklatura system modeled on the Soviet Union; there was no civil service independent of the ruling party.

=== 1980s reforms ===
Following the death of Mao Zedong and the rise of reformist Deng Xiaoping, efforts began to change the cadre system after the discord of the Cultural Revolution so that the CCP would be able to effectively carry out the modernization of China. Reforms beginning in 1984 did not decrease the approximately 8.1 million cadre positions across China, but began to decentralize their management to authorities at provincial and local levels.

Zhao Ziyang, elected General Secretary of the Chinese Communist Party in 1987, sought to transform the cadre system into a more independent body resembling a civil service. The civil service not completely subservient to the CCP, and thus reform the relationship between the CCP and the state. In the aftermath of the 1989 Tiananmen Square protests and massacre, Zhao and his allies lost their influence among CCP elite and the civil service reform project was denounced by remaining leaders. Zhao's proposals were subsequently heavily modified and implemented as the "Provisional Regulations on State Civil Servants" in 1993, albeit on a much less comprehensive scale.

Nevertheless, the Provisional Regulations established the first formal civil service in China since the founding of the People's Republic.

Since the early 2000s, recruitment quotas for non-CCP members, gender, and ethnic group, have been institutionalized to increase representation of such groups in the civil service.

=== Xi Jinping ===
In 2018, the CCP's Organization Department absorbed the State Civil Servants Bureau. Under the general secretaryship of Xi Jinping, civil servants and their spouses are increasingly denied the right travel abroad, and some must submit their passports to the authorities while in-country.

A key institution in the Chinese public administration are party schools, which are tasked to train senior officials and "reinforce individual commitment to the party." In Training the Party, political scientist Charlotte Lee finds that these schools have become partly commercialized while still retaining their core political functions.

According to the 2020 Law on Governmental Sanctions for Public Employees, any public employee, including civil servants, that publish "articles, speeches, declarations, and statements opposing the State's guiding ideologies established in the Constitution, the leadership of the Communist Party, the socialist system, or the reform and opening up" are to be automatically dismissed from office.

== Levels and ranking system ==
The current ranking system has 27 different ranks (from previously of total 15 levels) and a grade (dangci) system within each rank (at most 14 grades for each rank) to reflect seniority and performance; a combination of rank and dangci ultimately determine pay and benefits. The highest tiers (including department chiefs, deputy department chiefs, and section chiefs) have significant involvement in policy-making. Within local governments, the highest level decision-makers are typically the CCP committee secretary, the state chief, and party committee members.

The 27 ranks are sub-divisions of 11 "levels". The following is a non-exhaustive list of party and state positions corresponding to their civil service rank. The list only comprises "leadership positions" (lingdao ganbu), but not civil servants who are not in leadership positions. Non-leading civil servants can be given high corresponding ranks. For example, an expert or advisor hired by the government on a long-term initiative does not manage any people or lead any organization, but may still receive a sub-provincial rank. Similarly, retired officials who take on lesser-ranked (usually ceremonial) positions after retirement would generally retain their highest rank. Occasionally, officials may hold a position but be of a higher rank than what the position indicates, for example a Deputy Prefecture-level CCP committee secretary who holds a full prefecture-level rank.

Level	Rank	Level name	Party positions	Government positions
1	1 to 3	National-level (国家级正职)	General Secretary of the Chinese Communist Party; Members of the Politburo Standing Committee; Chairman of the Central Military Commission	President of China; Premier of the State Council; Chairman of the Standing Committee of the National People's Congress; Chairman of the Chinese People's Political Consultative Conference
2	4 to 6	Deputy national -level (国家级副职)	Members of the Politburo of the Chinese Communist Party; Secretary of the Central Commission for Discipline Inspection; Secretaries of the Secretariat of the Chinese Communist Party	Vice President of China; Vice Premier of the State Council; State Councilors; Vice Chairman of the Central Military Commission; Vice Chair of the Standing Committee of the National People's Congress; Vice Chair of the Chinese People's Political Consultative Conference; President of the Supreme People's Court; Procurator-General of the Supreme People's Procuratorate
3	7 to 8	Provincial and ministerial level (省部级正职)	Secretary of Party Committees of Provinces, Autonomous Regions, Direct-controlled Municipalities; Deputy Secretary of the Central Commission for Discipline Inspection; Leaders of bodies reporting directly to the Central Committee, such as the General Office, the International Department, United Front Work Department, Organization Department, Publicity Department, Politics and Law Commission, Central Party School; First Secretary of the Communist Youth League of China; Party Branch Secretary of national civic organizations such as the All-China Federation of Trade Unions; Chiefs of the General Offices that serve a Central Leading Group	Provincial Governor (Mayor of a direct-controlled Municipality, Chairman of an Autonomous Region); Ministers of the State Council; Commissioners or Directors of agencies that directly report to the State Council, such as the National Development and Reform Commission; Chair of a Provincial-level People's Congress; Chair of a Provincial-level People's Political Consultative Conference; General Managers of key state-owned enterprises deemed to be "ministerial-level"; Chair of national civic organizations such as the All-China Federation of Trade Unions, All-China Women's Federation, etc.
4	9 to 10	Deputy-Provincial (Deputy-Ministerial) level (省部级副职)	Deputy Secretary of Party Committees of Provinces, Autonomous Regions, Direct-controlled Municipalities; Standing Committee Members of provincial-level Party Committees; Secretary of Party Committees of Sub-provincial cities; Deputy leaders of bodies reporting directly to the Central Committee, such as the General Office, International Liaison, United Front, Organization, Propaganda, Politics-Law, Central Party School; The chairman, secretary of the party committee (party group) and general manager of central enterprises such as State Grid Corporation of China; Party Secretary of key universities, such as Peking University	Deputy Governor (Autonomous Region Chairman, Mayor); Deputy Ministers of the State Council; Deputy Commissioners or Directors of agencies that directly report to the State Council; Vice Chair of a Provincial-level People's Congress; Vice Chair of a Provincial-level People's Political Consultative Conference; President of key universities, such as Tsinghua University
5	11 to 12	Bureau-Director level (厅局级正职)	Party Secretary of Prefecture-level cities and divisions; Deputy Party Secretary of Sub-provincial cities; Standing Committee members of Sub-provincial cities; Heads of provincial party organizations (Organization, Propaganda, United Front, etc.); Party Secretary of provincially run universities, such as Hubei University	Mayor of Prefecture-level cities; Vice Mayor of Sub-provincial cities; Directors (ministers) of provincial departments; Chairs of provincial civil organizations (Unions, Women's Federation etc.); Directors of departments of national-level ministries; Chair of Prefecture-level People's Congress; Chair of Prefecture-level People's Political Consultative Conference; President of provincially run universities, such as Shanxi University
6	13 to 14	Deputy-Bureau-Director level (厅局级副职)	Deputy Party Secretary of Prefecture-level cities and divisions; Standing Committee members of Party Committees of Prefecture-level cities; Deputy heads of provincial party organizations (Organization, Propaganda, United Front, etc.)	Vice Mayor of Prefecture-level cities; Vice Chair of Prefecture-level People's Congress; Vice Chair of Prefecture-level People's Political Consultative Conference; Deputy Chairs of provincial civil organizations (Unions, Women's Federation etc.); Deputy directors (ministers) of provincial departments
7	15 to 16	Division-Head level (县处级正职)	Party Secretary of Counties or County-level cities; Party Secretary of Districts of Prefecture-level cities; Heads of prefecture-level party organizations (Organization, Propaganda, United Front, etc.)	County Governors; Governor of Districts of Prefecture-level cities; Mayor of County-level cities; Chair of County-level People's Congress; Chair of County-level People's Political Consultative Conference; Heads of sub-divisions of a provincial department
8	17 to 18	Deputy-Division-Head level (县处级副职)	Deputy Party Secretary of Counties or County-level cities; Deputy Party Secretary of Districts of Prefecture-level cities; Standing Committee members of County-level Party Committees	Deputy County Governors; Vice Mayor of County-level cities; Vice Chair of County-level People's Congress; Vice Chair of County-level People's Political Consultative Conference
9	19 to 20	Section-Head level (乡科级正职)	Party Secretary of Towns or Townships; Heads of county-level party organizations (Organization, Propaganda, United Front, etc.)	Magistrate of Townships (Mayor of Towns); Chair of Township-level People's Congress; Chair of Township-level People's Political Consultative Conference; Heads of sub-divisions of a prefecture-level department
10	21 to 22	Deputy-Section-Head level (乡科级副职)	Deputy Party Secretary or Standing Committee member of Towns or Townships; Deputy heads of county-level party organizations (Organization, Propaganda, United Front, etc.)	Deputy Magistrate of Towns or Townships; Vice Chair of Township-level People's Congress; Vice Chair of Township-level People's Political Consultative Conference
11	23 to 24	Section member (科员)	Staff subordinate to a section-head; Heads party organizations of township-level divisions	Staff subordinate to a section-head; Head of local departments of towns and townships, such as a town police chief or financial secretary
N/A	25 to 27	Ordinary Staff	Any unranked person; Village Party Branch Secretary	Any unranked person; Village chief

== State Administration of Civil Service ==
The State Administration of Civil Service was created in March 2008 by the National People's Congress. It is under the management of the Ministry of Human Resources and Social Security, which resulted from the merger of the Ministry of Personnel and the Ministry of Human Resources and Social Security. The function of the administration covers management, recruitment, assessment, training, rewards, supervision and other aspects related to civil service affairs. The administration also has several new functions. These include drawing up regulations on the trial periods of newly enrolled personnel, further protecting the legal rights of civil servants and having the responsibility of the registration of civil servants under central departments. Its establishment was part of the government's reshuffle in 2008. It aimed at a "super ministry" system to streamline government department functions.

== Examinations ==
For decades, civil service jobs have been among the top career choices for college graduates. In 1993, the civil service examination and evaluation were established. Generally, more than a million people enroll each year in the civil service examination and success rates are approximately 2%.

An alternative route to civil service other than the examination is the assigned graduates system (xuandiaosheng, 选调生), which is available to student cadres who are at least probationary members of the CCP. Through the assigned graduates system, new university graduates enter a program that sends them to grassroots positions like village leadership roles or local Communist Youth League secretaries for a few years. Candidates for the assigned graduates system take written and oral examinations arranged by the CCP's Organization Department at its local or provincial levels. The examinations cover public service topics similar to those in the civil service examination, but are generally viewed as less competitive.

Programs similar to the assigned graduate system began appearing in the 1980s but were formalized after 2000.

== Salary and allowances ==
There are three main components of civil service pay according to the 2006 pay regulation by the State Council of the People's Republic of China, namely base pay (基本工资), cost-of-living allowances (津补贴), and bonus (奖金).

== See also ==
- Politics of China
- Cadre system of the Chinese Communist Party
- Orders of precedence in China
- Administrative divisions of China
- Chinese Academy of Governance
- Chinese Public Administration Society
- Examination Yuan, the Republican era equivalent now operates on Taiwan since 1949.
