= Battle of Dengbu Island =

1949 battle of the Chinese Civil War

Coordinates: 29.87°N 122.310°E

- Part of the Chinese Civil War
| Date | 3–5 November 1949 (2 days) |
| Location | Dengbu Island |
| Result | Republic of China victory |

Belligerents
| Republic of China (Taiwan) | People's Republic of China |

Commanders and leaders
| Liu Lien-Yi | Hu Wei |

Strength
| Unknown from the 221st Division, 67th Division, 75th Division | 20,000 men+ from the 61st Division with additional units |

Casualties and losses
| 2,173 killed and wounded | 3,660+ killed; 677+ captured |

The Battle of Dengbu Island (Chinese: 登步島戰役; pinyin: Dēngbù Dǎo Zhànyì) was a conflict between the Republic of China Army and People's Liberation Army over Dengbu Island (in the Zhoushan Islands) near mainland China. This conflict occurred from 3 November 1949 to 5 November 1949 and resulted in a Republic of China Army's victory.

Nevertheless, the Kuomintang was forced to withdraw in May 1950 when the PLA gained air superiority over the region, leaving Dengbu Island in the control of the mainland government.

== See also ==
- Outline of the Chinese Civil War
- Outline of the military history of the People's Republic of China
- National Revolutionary Army
- History of the People's Liberation Army
- Chinese Civil War
