= Science and Technology Commission of the Central Military Commission =

Chinese military agency

Science and Technology Department of the Central Military Commission
- 中央军事委员会科学技术委员会; Zhōngyāng Jūnshì Wěiyuánhuì Kēxué Jìshù Wěiyuánhuì
- National emblem of China

Agency overview
- Formed: 16 January 2016; 10 years ago
- Type: First-level functional agency of the Central Military Commission; Highest organ of defense research
- Jurisdiction: People's Liberation Army
- Headquarters: August 1st Building, Beijing
- Agency executive: Vice-Admiral Zhao Xiaozhe (赵晓哲), Secretary

The Science and Technology Department of the Central Military Commission (abbreviated as Chinese: 军委科技委; pinyin: Jūnwěi Kējìwěi) is a one institution, two names organ, a Theater Deputy-grade unit, and a first-level functional agency of China's CMC in charge of research of emerging technologies for use by the military. It is located in Beijing.

== History ==
In July 1982, the CMC merged the Science, Technology and Equipment Commission of the Central Military Commission of China, the National Defense Science and Technology Commission of the Chinese People's Liberation Army, and the National Defense Industry Office of the State Council to form the Commission of Science, Technology and Industry for National Defense of the People's Liberation Army, as the leading agency for the centralized management of national defense science and technology and national defense industry under the dual control of the Central Military Commission and the State Council.

The first leadership team consisted of five people: Director Zhang Zhenhuan (former deputy director of the Science and Technology Commission for National Defense), deputy director Qian Xuesen (former deputy director of the Science and Technology Commission for National Defense), Zhu Guangya (former deputy director of the Science and Technology Commission for National Defense), Song Jian (concurrently, Deputy Minister of Aerospace Industry), Ye Zhengda (former deputy director of the National Defense Industry Office).

In April 1998, the Central Military Commission decided to establish the General Armament Department of the Chinese People's Liberation Army. The General Armament Department retained the Science and Technology Committee, the technical command and leadership body of the former Commission of Science, Technology and Industry for National Defense, and made it into the Science and Technology Committee of the General Armament Department of the People's Liberation Army. The first leadership team of the Science and Technology Committee of the General Armament Department consisted of four people: Director Zhu Guangya, Deputy Director Guo Guirong, Li Fengzhou, and Li Hengxing (Commander of the 26th Base).

In January 2016, as part of the 2015 reform, the Science and Technology Committee of the General Armament Department of the Chinese People's Liberation Army was abolished and the Science and Technology Commission of the Central Military Commission was organized.

== Responsibilities ==
The STC is at the leading edge of the effort for "Civil-Military fusion" as proclaimed in 2019. According to the National Defense White Paper 2019, the main duties of the Science and Technology Commission are administering the national defense science and technology strategy, leading cutting-edge technological innovation in an organized manner, and promoting the development of military-civil fusion for science and technology. Compared to the traditional system of military R&D used by the GAD, the Science and Technology Commission appears to be promoting weapons development using existing cutting-edge technologies, while cooperating with the Equipment Development Department of the Central Military Commission to militarize new technologies.

== Organization ==
After its creation in 2016, the STC has the following subordinate institutions.

=== Internal Offices ===
- General Office (综合局)
- Innovation Bureau (科技创新局)
- Science and Technology Strategy Bureau (科技战略局)

=== Directly Subordinate Units ===
- China National Defense Science and Technology Information Center (中国国防科技信息中心)
