= Chairman responsibility system =

Military organizational structure in China

The chairman responsibility system (Chinese: 军委主席负责制; pinyin: Jūnwěi Zhǔxí Fùzézhì) is a military system in the People's Republic of China to ensure the absolute leadership of the chairman over the Central Military Commission. The system ensures the Chinese Communist Party (CCP)'s absolute control over the military and that the chairman is the commander-in-chief of the People's Liberation Army (PLA), the People's Armed Police (PAP) and the Militia.

== History ==
The chairman responsibility system was first established with its inclusion to the state constitution in 1982. It was added to the CCP constitution at the 19th Party National Congress in October 2017. Under the leadership of Xi Jinping, there has been a stronger emphasis on the chairman responsibility system.

== Definition ==
The phrase is included in both the state constitution and the CCP constitution. According to the State Council Information Office, the system is an "institutional arrangement for practicing the Party's absolute leadership over the military". Per the chairman responsibility system, all significant issues in national defense are planned and decided by the CMC chairman, who holds the final deciding vote on major military decisions and oversees the CMC's and the military's leadership and operations. Other members of the CMC are the chairman's top aides to assist his final say over key CMC matters. The chairman is the decision-maker regarding the decisions to enter war, formulates China's national defense strategy, orders troop deployments, and decides on research and development and the induction of strategic weapons. The chairman also has the exclusive right to appoint of CMC members and commanders up to the level of a headquarters department, military region, and service command. According to CMC work rules, other members of the commission are required to maintain absolute political loyalty to the chairman and implement all directives issued, as well as seek approval for travel, leave and public appearances and provide regular reports of their activities.
