= Hu Wei (general) =

Chinese major general (1920–2018)

Hu Wei

Hu Wei (Chinese: 胡炜; August 1920 – 20 June 2018) was a Chinese Communist revolutionary and a major general of the People's Liberation Army (PLA). He fought in the Second Sino-Japanese War, the Chinese Civil War, and the Korean War, and was commander of the PLA's 61st Division in the Battle of Dengbu Island (1949). He later served as commander of the 21st Army, deputy commander of the Lanzhou Military Region, deputy director of the Revolutionary Committee of Shaanxi Province, director of the General Office of the Central Military Commission, and deputy chief of staff of the PLA.

== Biography ==
Hu was born Hu Shoude (胡守德) in Yudian Township, Xincai County, Henan Province in August 1920. In the 1930s, he participated in student protests against Japanese aggressions in China. When the Second Sino-Japanese War broke out, he joined the Chinese Communist Party forces in southern Henan and later the New Fourth Army. He fought in many battles against both the Japanese and the Kuomintang (KMT) forces and rose to the position of regimental political commissar.

During the Chinese Civil War, he served as Political Department Director of the Fourth Brigade, Second Column of the East China Field Army, and fought in the battles of Subei (宿北), Ningxiang (宁象), Menglianggu, Linqu (临朐), and Huaihai. In 1949, he was appointed commander of the 61st Division of the 21st Army of the PLA at the age of only 29, becoming the youngest commander of the division.

In early November 1949, Hu commanded the 61st Division in the Battle of Dengbu Island, in an attempt to take the island of the Zhoushan Archipelago from KMT forces. PLA forces would rapidly take the island's heartland from Nationalist forces by the second day of the battle, however, would falter in the following two days and nights with the arrival of multiple regiments of Nationalist reinforcements. Recognizing the enemy's numerically superior strength, Hu's forces feigned several attacks before safely withdrawing on the night of November 5th. While KMT forces would ultimately secure the strategically important island, Hu Wei's command demonstrated strong control over the course of the battle and exemplified his talent as a commander. The Communists safely landed on the island, fought as they wished (even striking the Nationalist's headquarters at one point in the battle) and retreated when they realized the situation was not in their favor. According to the Kuomintang, the Communist PLA forces suffered 3,700 casualties and 1,500 soldiers were captured, whereas 1,919 KMT soldiers were killed and more than 900 wounded. The battle, together with the Battle of Guningtou, is celebrated in Taiwan as a victory that helped save it from Communist occupation. According to the PLA, Hu retreated due to the lack of reinforcements and his forces killed, wounded, or captured 3,396 KMT troops.

In 1953, Hu Wei fought in the Korean War as chief of staff of the 21st Army of the People's Volunteer Army. After returning to China, he served successively as deputy commander, political commissar, and commander of the 21st Army. He attained the rank of major general in 1961.

During the Cultural Revolution, Hu was promoted to deputy commander of the Lanzhou Military Region in 1969 while concurrently serving as commander of the 21st Army. He also served as deputy director of the Revolutionary Committee of Shaanxi as well as Party Secretary of the province.

In December 1974, Hu was appointed director of the General Office of the Central Military Commission and deputy chief of staff of the People's Liberation Army. He was also an alternate member of the 9th and 10th Central Committee of the Chinese Communist Party. He retired in 1984.

Hu died on 20 June 2018 in Beijing, at the age of 97.
