= Civilian control of the military in communist states =

Civilian control of the military in communist states have differed from country to country. There are typically three models of civilian control of the military: party-run, state-run, and hybrid. In all three models, the communist party has an internal organisation in the military.

== Party-run ==
In the party-run model, the military is entirely run through the organ on military affairs of the central committee of the communist party. This was the case in the People's Republic of China from 1975 to 1983, when there existed no state counterpart to the Central Military Commission (CMC) of the Central Committee of the Chinese Communist Party (CCP). Since 1982, under the principle of "one institution with two names", a state CMC counterpart with an identical name, personnel and organization has existed alongside its party counterpart. The CCP's authority is stated in law, Article 21 of the Law of the People's Republic of China on National Defense states, "The armed forces of the People’s Republic of China is subject to the leadership of the Chinese Communist Party."

== State-run ==
In the state-run model, the highest organ on military affairs is part of the supreme organ of state power, with no party counterpart. This model was practised by the Soviet Union, in which the Council of Defence, appointed by the Presidium of the Supreme Soviet, led the Soviet armed forces. However, party leadership was ensured by the Soviet party leader, the general secretary of the Central Committee of the Communist Party of the Soviet Union, serving ex officio as chairman of the Council of Defence.

== Hybrid ==
In the hybrid model, both the state and the party have organs on military affairs. This model is practised in Vietnam, in which the Communist Party of Vietnam (CPV) has an internal organ on military affairs led by the party leader and the supreme organ of state power, the National Assembly of Vietnam, having a state counterpart led by the President of Vietnam. Despite this, the Vietnamese political system stresses that the Vietnamese armed forces are under the absolute leadership of the CPV.

== Examples ==
=== People's Republic of China ===
- Central Military Commission of the Chinese Communist Party (party)
- Central Military Commission of the People's Republic of China (state counterpart)

=== Democratic People's Republic of Korea ===
- Central Military Commission of the Workers' Party of Korea (party)
- State Affairs Commission of North Korea (state counterpart)

=== Socialist Republic of Vietnam ===
- Central Military Commission of the Communist Party of Vietnam (party)
- Council for National Defense and Security (Vietnam) (state counterpart)
