= Wang Guanzhong =

- 王冠中
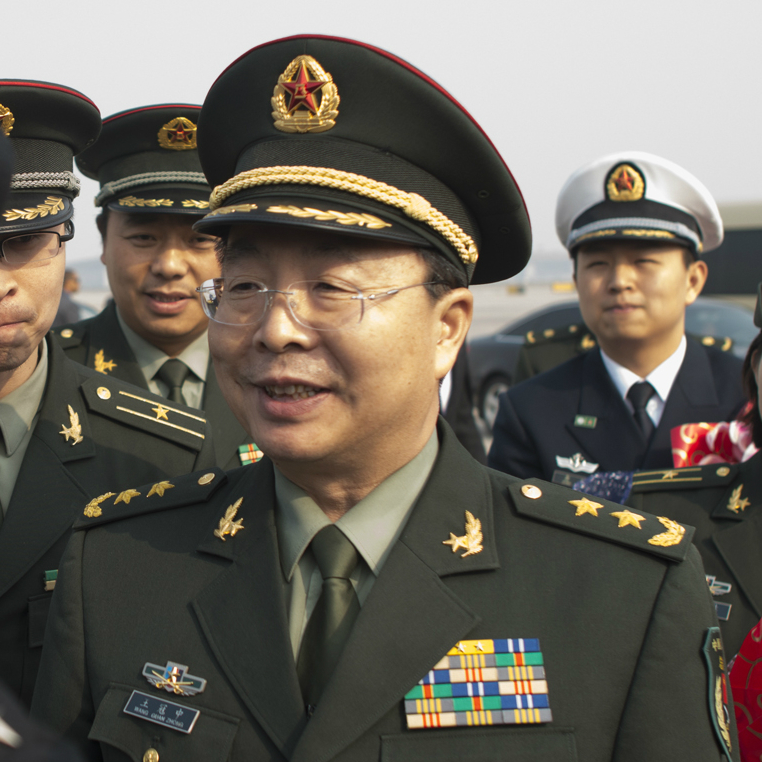

Deputy Chief of Joint Staff
- In office October 2012 – 2017

Personal details
- Born: February 1953 (age 73) Zhaodong, Heilongjiang, China
- Party: Chinese Communist Party
- Education: PLA Xi'an Political Academy, Central Party School

Military service
- Allegiance: China
- Branch/service: People's Liberation Army
- Years of service: 1970−2017
- Rank: General

Wang Guanzhong (Chinese: 王冠中; born February 1953) is a retired general (shang jiang) of the Chinese People's Liberation Army (PLA). He served as a deputy chief of the Joint Staff and was a member of the 18th Central Committee of the Chinese Communist Party.

== Biography ==
Wang Guanzhong was born in February 1953 in Zhaodong, Heilongjiang Province. He joined the PLA in December 1970, serving in the army artillery force in the Shenyang Military Region. He became an officer in 1974 and joined the Chinese Communist Party in the same year. From 1978 to 1979 he studied at the PLA Xi'an Political Academy. From 1983 to 1986 he studied at the graduate school of the Central Party School on a full-time basis.

In 2001 Wang became a deputy director of the General Office of the Central Military Commission, and was promoted to Director in 2007. He also served as a member of the 17th Central Commission for Discipline Inspection from 2007 to 2012. In October 2012, he was promoted to Deputy Chief of the Joint Staff . In the same year, he was elected to the 18th Central Committee of the Chinese Communist Party (2012–17) as a full member.

Wang Guanzhong attained the rank of major general in 2001 and lieutenant general in 2009. On 31 July 2015, he was promoted to general (shang jiang), the highest rank for Chinese military officers in active service, along with nine other officers.

== 2014 Shangri-La Dialogue ==
In 2014, Wang Guanzhong attended the Shangri-La Dialogue in Singapore as China's top military delegate. After Japanese Prime Minister Shinzo Abe and US Defense Secretary Chuck Hagel criticized China's actions in the South China Sea dispute, Wang accused Abe and Hagel of provocation and intimidation. In his speech at the dialogue, he said the criticism was unwarranted and appeared to be coordinated to "stage a provocative challenge against China".
