= Chairman of the Central Military Commission (China) =

Commander-in-chief of the People's Liberation Army

Chairman of the Central Military Commission of the Chinese Communist Party Chairman of the Central Military Commission of the People's Republic of China
- 中国共产党中央军事委员会主席 中华人民共和国中央军事委员会主席
- Emblems of the Chinese Communist Party and the People's Republic of China

- Flags of the Chinese Communist Party and the People's Republic of China

- Incumbent; Xi Jinping since 15 November 2012 (party commission); 14 March 2013 (state commission)
- Central Military Commission
- Style: Chairman (主席) (informal); Comrade (同志) (formal)
- Type: Commander-in-chief
- Status: National-level official
- Residence: Zhongnanhai
- Seat: August 1st Building, Beijing
- Nominator: Party Central Committee (party commission); Presidium of the National People's Congress (state commission)
- Appointer: Party Central Committee (party commission) National People's Congress (state commission)
- Term length: Five years, renewable
- Inaugural holder: Zhang Guotao (party commission); Mao Zedong (state commission)
- Formation: December 1925; 100 years ago (party commission); 1 October 1949; 77 years ago (state commission)
- Deputy: Vice Chairman of the Central Military Commission

Chairman of the Central Military Commission
- Simplified Chinese: 中央军事委员会主席
- Traditional Chinese: 中央軍事委員會主席
Transcriptions
Standard Mandarin
- Hanyu Pinyin: Zhōngyāng Jūnshì Wěiyuánhuì Zhǔxí

Central Military Commission of the Chinese Communist Party and the People's Republic of China
- Simplified Chinese: 中国共产党和中华人民共和国中央军事委员会主席
- Traditional Chinese: 中國共產黨和中華人民共和國中央軍事委員會主席
Transcriptions
Standard Mandarin
- Hanyu Pinyin: Zhōngguó Gòngchǎndǎng hé Zhōnghuá Rénmín Gònghéguó Zhōngyāng Jūnshì Wěiyuánhuì Zhǔxí

Central Military Commission of the Chinese Communist Party
- Simplified Chinese: 中国共产党中央军事委员会主席
- Traditional Chinese: 中國共產黨中央軍事委員會主席
Transcriptions
Standard Mandarin
- Hanyu Pinyin: Zhōngguó Gòngchǎndǎng Zhōngyāng Jūnshì Wěiyuánhuì Zhǔxí

Central Military Commission of the People's Republic of China
- Simplified Chinese: 中华人民共和国中央军事委员会主席
- Traditional Chinese: 中華人民共和國中央軍事委員會主席
Transcriptions
Standard Mandarin
- Hanyu Pinyin: Zhōnghuá Rénmín Gònghéguó Zhōngyāng Jūnshì Wěiyuánhuì Zhǔxí

The chairman of the Central Military Commission is the head of the Central Military Commission (CMC) and the commander-in-chief of the People's Liberation Army (PLA), the People's Armed Police (PAP) and the Militia. The officeholder is additionally vested with command authority over the nuclear arsenal of the People's Republic of China. There are technically two offices with the same name; the chairman of the Chinese Communist Party (CCP) Central Military Commission and chairman of the People's Republic of China (PRC) Central Military Commission. However, under the arrangement of "one institution with two names", they function as one office.

The officeholder is usually the CCP general secretary; this grants significant political power as the only member of the Politburo Standing Committee with direct responsibilities for the armed forces. The chairman assumes overall responsibility over the work of the CMC. Per the chairman responsibility system, all significant issues in national defense are planned and decided by the CMC chairman, who holds the final deciding vote on major military decisions and oversees the CMC's and the military's leadership and operations. Other members of the CMC are the chairman's top aides to assist his final say over key CMC matters. The chairman is the decision-maker regarding the decisions to enter war, formulates China's national defense strategy, orders troop deployments, and decides on research and development and the introduction of strategic weapons. The chairman also has the exclusive right to appoint of CMC members and commanders up to the level of a headquarters department, military region, and service command. According to CMC work rules, other members of the commission are required to maintain absolute political loyalty to the chairman and implement all directives issued, as well as seek approval for travel, leave and public appearances and provide regular reports of their activities. The office confers military ranks, though regulations stipulate that no military rank shall be conferred on the chairman themselves.

According to the state constitution, the state CMC chairman is responsible to the National People's Congress (NPC) and its Standing Committee. The state CMC chairman is officially nominated by the Presidium of the NPC during a session and approved by the delegations of the NPC, and its term of office is the same as the NPC. The Party CMC chairman is officially elected by the CCP's Central Committee. The current chairman is Xi Jinping, who took office as the Chairman of the CCP Central Military Commission on 15 November 2012, and as the Chairman of the PRC Central Military Commission on 14 March 2013.

== List of chairmen ==
=== Chinese Communist Party ===
The following have held the position of chair of the Central Military Commission of the Chinese Communist Party:

No.	Portrait	Name (birth–death)	Term of office			Ref.
No.	Portrait	Name (birth–death)	Took office	Left office	Time in office	Ref.
Head of the Military Department
1		Zhang Guotao (1897–1979)	December 1925	September 1926	9 months	
Secretary of the Central Military Commission
2		Zhou Enlai (1898–1976)	September 1926	October 1928	2 years, 1 month	
Head of the Military Department
3		Yang Yin (1892–1929)	October 1928	September 1929	11 months	
(2)		Zhou Enlai (1898–1976)	September 1929	March 1930	6 months	
Secretary of the Central Military Commission
4		Guan Xiangying (1902–1946)	March 1930	August 1930	5 months	
(2)		Zhou Enlai (1898–1976)	August 1930	June 1931	10 months	
Head of the Military Department						
5		Li Fuchun (1900–1975)	June 1931	January 1932	7 months	
Chairman of the Central Military Commission of the Chinese Soviet Republic						
6		Xiang Ying (c. 1895–1941)	January 1932	October 1932	9 months	
7		Zhu De (1886–1976)	October 1932	December 1936	4 years, 2 months	
8		Mao Zedong (1893–1976)	December 1936	1 October 1949	12 years, 10 months	
Abolished 1 October 1949 – 8 September 1954
Chairman of the Central Military Commission of the Chinese Communist Party
(8)		Mao Zedong (1893–1976)	8 September 1954	9 September 1976 †	22 years, 1 day	
9		Hua Guofeng (1921–2008)	7 October 1976	28 June 1981	4 years, 264 days	
10		Deng Xiaoping (1904–1997)	28 June 1981	9 November 1989	8 years, 134 days	
11		Jiang Zemin (1926–2022)	9 November 1989	19 September 2004	14 years, 315 days	
12		Hu Jintao (born 1942)	19 September 2004	15 November 2012	8 years, 57 days	
13		Xi Jinping (born 1953)	15 November 2012	Incumbent	13 years, 321 days	

=== People's Republic of China ===
The following have held the position of chairman of the Central Military Commission of the People's Republic of China:

No.	Portrait	Name (birth–death)	Term of office			Ref.
No.	Portrait	Name (birth–death)	Took office	Left office	Time in office	Ref.
Chairman of the People's Revolutionary Military Commission of the Central People's Government
1		Mao Zedong (1893–1976)	1 October 1949	27 September 1954	4 years, 361 days	
Chairman of the National Defense Commission of the People's Republic of China
(1)		Mao Zedong (1893–1976)	27 September 1954	27 April 1959	4 years, 212 days	
2		Liu Shaoqi (1898–1969)	27 April 1959	31 October 1968	9 years, 187 days	
Vacant 31 October 1968 – 17 January 1975
Abolished 17 January 1975 – December 1982
Chairman of the Central Military Commission of the People's Republic of China
3		Deng Xiaoping (1904–1997)	6 June 1983	19 March 1990	6 years, 284 days	
4		Jiang Zemin (1926–2022)	19 March 1990	8 March 2005	14 years, 354 days	
5		Hu Jintao (born 1942)	8 March 2005	14 March 2013	8 years, 6 days	
6		Xi Jinping (born 1953)	14 March 2013	Incumbent	13 years, 202 days	

== See also ==
- Office of the Chairman of the Central Military Commission
- List of leaders of the People's Republic of China
- Paramount leader
