= Law on Governmental Sanctions for Public Employees =

Law of China

Law of the People's Republic of China on Governmental Sanctions for Public Employees

Standing Committee of the National People's Congress
- Passed by: Standing Committee of the National People's Congress
- Passed: 20 June 2020
- Signed by: President Xi Jinping
- Signed: 20 June 2020
- Commenced: 1 July 2020

Legislative history
- Introduced by: Supervisory and Judicial Affairs Committee
- First reading: August 22–26, 2019
- Second reading: April 26–29, 2020
- Third reading: August 22–26, 2020

Related legislation
- Supervision Law
- Status: In force

Law on Governmental Sanctions for Public Employees
- Simplified Chinese: 中华人民共和国公职人员政务处分法
- Traditional Chinese: 中华人民共和国公职人员政务处分法
Transcriptions
Standard Mandarin
- Hanyu Pinyin: Zhōnghuá Rénmín Gònghéguó Gōngzhí Rényuán Zhèngwù Chǔfènfǎ

The Law of the People's Republic of China on Governmental Sanctions for Public Employees is a law that regulates the conduct of public employees. It was adopted on 20 June 2020, at a meeting of the Standing Committee of the National People's Congress, and came into effect on 1 July 2020.

== History ==
The law was adopted on 20 June 2020, at a meeting of the Standing Committee of the National People's Congress, and signed by President Xi Jinping on the same day. It came into effect on 1 July 2020.

== Content ==
The law consists of seven chapters and 68 articles. It regulates the conduct of public employees. The law defines public employees as:

- Civil servants and "persons managed with reference"
- "Persons engaged in public affairs at organizations that manage public affairs as authorized by laws, regulations, or state organs"
- Management officials at state-owned enterprises
- Those engaged in management in "public education, scientific research, culture, healthcare, sports, and other such institutions"
- Those engaged in management at "urban residents’ committees or villagers’ committees"
- Others who perform public duties

The law authorizes supervisory commissions and "recruiting organs or units" to give sanctions to public employees in violation of the provisions of the law; only one of them can give sanctions to the employee for the same offense. The law provides six type of sanctions with the following time periods:

1. “warnings”: 6 months;
2. “demerits”: 12 months;
3. “major demerits”: 18 months;
4. “demotions”: 24 months;
5. “removals”: 24 months; and
6. “dismissals”

Sanctioned officials are not eligible for promotion during the time period of their sanction, while those subject to removals have their salaries and other benefits reduced. Additionally, the sanctioned employees' "illegal gains and personal property used for illegal purposes" are confiscated or, if possible, returned to their rightful owners. Those dismissed are also forbidden from entering the civil service.

The law states that any employee that "publishes articles, speeches, declarations, and statements opposing the State’s guiding ideologies established in the Constitution, the leadership of the Communist Party, the socialist system, or the reform and opening up" are to be automatically dismissed.
