= Ningdu Uprising =

Uprising in China

The Ningdu revolt (simplified Chinese: 宁都暴动; traditional Chinese: 寧都暴動), also known as the Ningdu uprising (Chinese: 宁都起义), was a rebellion by the 26th Route Army of the National Revolutionary Army of the Republic of China in Ningdu County, Jiangxi Province on December 14, 1931. 17,000 soldiers of the 26th Route Army defected from the Kuomintang to the Chinese Workers' and Peasants' Red Army of the Chinese Communist Party.

After the conclusion of the Central Plains War, the 5th Route Army of the Northwest Army, formerly under the command of Feng Yuxiang, was redesignated as the 26th Route Army and brought the direct control of the Nationalist Government of Chiang Kai-shek. Sun Lianzhong was made commander of this army. The army had been infiltrated by members of the Chinese Communist Party as early as the Northern Expedition.

When the 26th Route Army was brought to participate in the campaign against the Jiangxi Soviet, the Chinese Communist Party began intensifying their activities within the army to plan a mutiny.

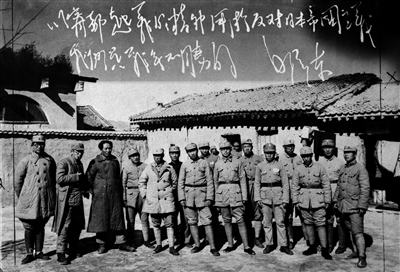
In December 1938, Mao Zedong met in Yan'an with key participants of the Ningdu Uprising, including Hu Zhaolin, Hao Peimou, and others. Xiao Jinguang and Wang Jiaxiang also attended. Mao took a group photo with them, inscribing: “With the spirit of the Ningdu Uprising, we will be invincible in opposing Japanese imperialism.”

At the end of November 1931, Wang Chao, the leading member of the Chinese Communist Party within the army was arrested and defected. Chiang Kai-Shek urgently telegraphed Sun Lianzhong requesting asking he begin investigating, instead the telegram received by the deputy army commander and chief of staff, Zhao Bosheng. Zhao was a secret member of the communist party.

Zhao immediately contacted the commanders of the 26th Route Army, 25th Division's 73rd and 74th Brigade to plot an uprising. The two brigade commanders agreed to the plan and contacted the communists, who sent Wang Jiaxiang and Zuo Quan with the 12th Division of the Red 4th Army to assist them. On December 14, the 26th Route Army, with the exception of one regiment of its 25th Division, whose commander, Liu, opposed the uprising went over to the communists. On December 16, it reached the territory controlled by the Jiangxi Soviet and was made the Red 5th Army Corps.

== Aftermath ==
Among the 11 brigade and regiment commanders of the 26th Army detained by Zhao Bosheng and others during the Ningdu Uprising:

- 1 joined the Red Army and died in battle (Wang Guangjian);
- 1 was wrongly executed after joining the Red Army (Zhang Shaoyi);
- 3 left the Soviet zone and returned to their hometowns (Cao Daoming, Li Jinting, Guo Daopei);
- 6 left the Soviet zone and rejoined Sun Lianzhong's forces (Feng Anbang, Wang Enbu, Yang Shoudao, Zhang Fangzhao, Wang Tianshun, Liu Yuqi).

Zhao and the two brigade commanders died later during the Chinese Civil War, but some of those who helped them were prominent later, including Ji Pengfei and Huang Zhen.

== See also ==
- Outline of the Chinese Civil War
