= Xiao Xiangrong =

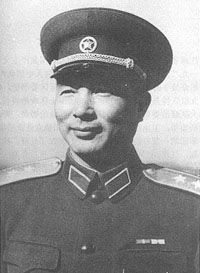

Xiao Xiangrong (Chinese: 肖向荣; September 6, 1910 – March 26, 1976) birth name Xiao Muyuan (Chinese: 萧木元) was a lieutenant general in the People's Liberation Army. Born in Guangdong Province, Xiao attended the Whampoa Military Academy in 1925. As a member of the Chinese Workers' and Peasants' Red Army during the Chinese Civil War, he was based in Yongding County, western Fujian Province, near the border region of Fujian, Guangdong and Jiangxi. He later relocated to the border region of Shaanxi, Gansu and Ningxia where he was a member of the 115th Division of the Eighth Route Army during the Second Sino-Japanese War. After liberation, he became the first director of the CCP Military Affairs Committee General Office. On 25 November 1949, the Overseas Chinese Daily News reported Xiao's appointment as Head of the Political Section of the Guangdong Military District. He was persecuted during the Cultural Revolution.

== Bibliography ==
- MACFARQUHAR, Robert. Mao's Last Revolution
- Teiwes, Frederick C., Warren Sun. The Tragedy of Lin Biao: Riding the Tiger During the Cultural Revolution
