= Central Military Commission (China) =

People's Republic of China political bodies governing the military

Central Military Commission of the Chinese Communist Party Central Military Commission of the People's Republic of China
- Emblem of the Chinese Communist Party

- National emblem

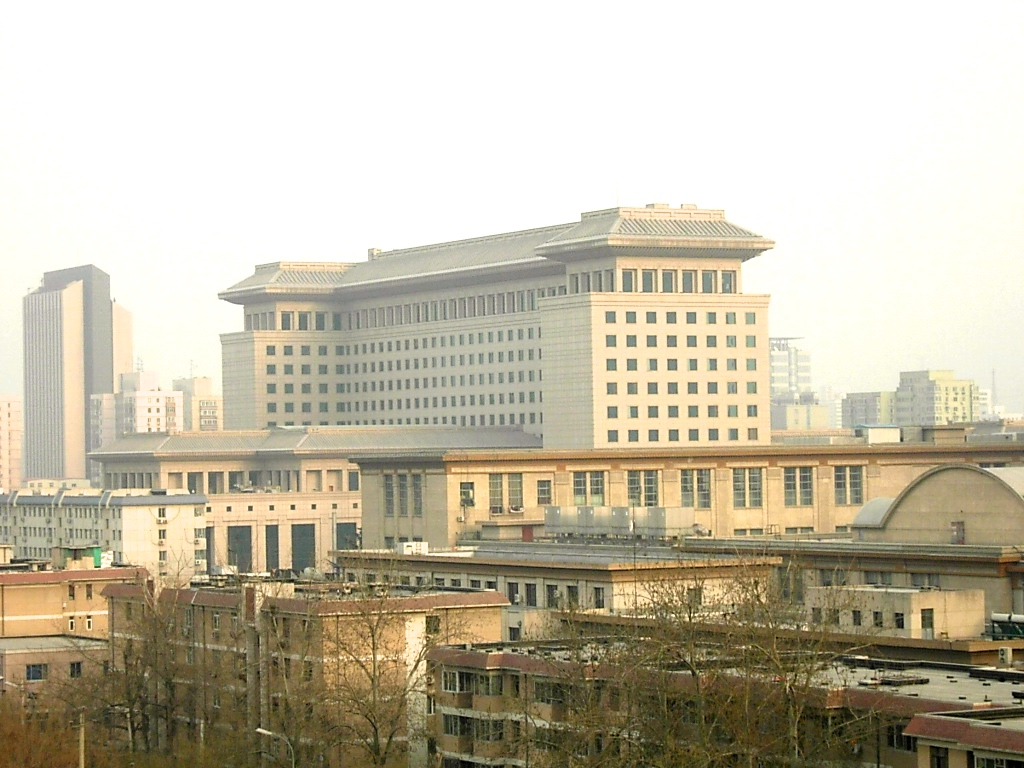
- The CMC is housed in the same building as the Ministry of National Defense, the "August 1st Building"

Agency overview
- Formed: 28 September 1954; 72 years ago (party); 6 June 1983; 43 years ago (state)
- Preceding agencies: People's Revolutionary Military Commission (1949–1954); National Defense Commission (1954–1975)
- Type: National level agency
- Jurisdiction: China
- Headquarters: August 1st Building, Beijing
- Agency executive: Xi Jinping, Chairman; General Zhang Shengmin, Vice Chairman
- Parent agency: Central Committee of the Chinese Communist Party; National People's Congress (and its Standing Committee)
- Child agencies: People's Liberation Army; People's Armed Police; Militia of China
- Website: www.81.cn chinamil.com.cn (in English)

Central Military Commission
- Simplified Chinese: 中央军事委员会
- Traditional Chinese: 中央軍事委員會
- Literal meaning: Central Military Affairs Commission
Transcriptions
Standard Mandarin
- Hanyu Pinyin: Zhōngyāng Jūnshì Wěiyuánhuì
- Bopomofo: ㄓㄨㄥ ㄧㄤ ㄐㄩㄣ ㄕ` ㄨㄟˇ ㄩㄢ´ ㄏㄨㄟ`
other Mandarin
- Xiao'erjing: ﺟْﻮ ﻳْﺎ کٌ شِ وِ ﻳُﻮًا ﺧُﻮِ
Hakka
- Romanization: Tûng-ông kiûn-sṳ ve yèn fi
Yue: Cantonese
- Jyutping: zung1joeng1gwan1si6wai2jyun4wui2
other Yue
- Taishanese: Jüng-yëng gün-xù Vī-yõn-vòi
Southern Min
- Hokkien POJ: Tiong-ng kun-sū úi ôan hōe
Eastern Min
- Fuzhou BUC: Dṳ̆ng iŏng gŭng-sê̤ṳ ūi uòng huôi
Pu-Xian Min
- Hinghwa BUC: De̤ng ng geong seō ûi é̤ng hōi

Central Military Commission of the Chinese Communist Party and the People's Republic of China
- Simplified Chinese: 中国共产党和中华人民共和国中央军事委员会
- Traditional Chinese: 中國共產黨和中華人民共和國中央軍事委員會
Transcriptions
Standard Mandarin
- Hanyu Pinyin: Zhōngguó Gòngchǎndǎng hé Zhōnghuá Rénmín Gònghéguó Zhōngyāng Jūnshì Wěiyuánhuì
Yue: Cantonese
- Jyutping: zung1gwok3 gung6caan2dong2 tung4 zung1waa4 jan4man4 gung6wo4gwok3 zung1joeng1 gwan1si6 wai2jyun4wui2

Central Military Commission of the Chinese Communist Party (abbreviated)
- Simplified Chinese: 中共中央军委
- Traditional Chinese: 中共中央軍委
Transcriptions
Standard Mandarin
- Hanyu Pinyin: Zhōnggòng Zhōngyāng Jūnwěi
Yue: Cantonese
- Jyutping: zung1gung6 zung1joeng1 gwan1wai2

Central Military Commission of the People's Republic of China (abbreviated)
- Simplified Chinese: 国家中央军委
- Traditional Chinese: 國家中央軍委
- Literal meaning: National Central Military Commission
Transcriptions
Standard Mandarin
- Hanyu Pinyin: Guójiā Zhōngyāng Jūnwěi
Yue: Cantonese
- Jyutping: gwok3gaa1 zung1joeng1 gwan1wai2

The Central Military Commission (CMC) is the supreme military leadership body of the Chinese Communist Party (CCP) and the People's Republic of China (PRC), which heads the People's Liberation Army (PLA), the People's Armed Police (PAP), and the Militia. There are technically two separate commissions; the Central Military Commission of the Chinese Communist Party and the Central Military Commission of the People's Republic of China, though under an arrangement termed "one institution with two names", they function as a single institution. The CMC chairman is concurrently held by the general secretary of the Chinese Communist Party in line with the CCP's absolute control over the military.

The CCP first established a military department in 1925. The CCP Central Revolutionary Military Commission was established in 1937, which later evolved to the Central Military Commission in 1945. After the proclamation of the People's Republic of China, in 1949, military leadership was transferred to the People's Revolutionary Military Commission of the Central People's Government; there was no separate CCP organ during this time. In 1954, the CCP Central Military Commission was re-established, while state military authority was transferred to the National Defense Commission. In 1975, during the Cultural Revolution, the NDC was abolished, leaving the Party CMC as the sole governing body of the military. In 1982, the State Central Military Commission was established in order to formalize its role within the government structure. In 2016, a series of institutional reforms of the CMC bodies was undertaken, with PLA's four general departments being replaced by 15 departments that report directly to the CMC.

Aside from periods of transition, both commissions have identical personnel, organization and functions. The commission's parallel hierarchy allows the CCP to supervise the political and military activities of the PLA, including issuing directives on senior appointments, troop deployments and arms spending. The CMC is chaired by Xi Jinping, the general secretary of the Chinese Communist Party and paramount leader. Almost all the members are senior generals or admirals, but the chairmanship has always been held by the party's most senior leaders (who are civilians under the principle that "the Party commands the gun") to ensure the loyalty of the armed forces. The chairman has absolute leadership over the commission per the chairman responsibility system. The CMC has 15 general departments and the five theater commands, through which it oversees each of the service branches of the PLA. The CMC is housed in the Ministry of National Defense compound (August 1st Building) in western Beijing.

== History ==
In 1925, the CCP's Central Military Department, was renamed the Central Military Commission. It was first led by Zhang Guotao who was replaced by Zhou Enlai in 1926 as head of the CMC. At the time of the First United Front, the CMC was not a unified military command structure but was more of an administrative liaison with other armed communist groups.

As a commission, the CMC ranks higher in the party hierarchy than departments such as the Organization or United Front Departments. In 1937, the CCP Central Revolutionary Military Commission (Note: Chinese: 中共中央革命軍事委員會; pinyin: Zhōnggòng Zhōngyāng Gémìng Jūnshì Wěiyuánhuì) was created after the Chinese Soviet Republic's Chinese Red Army were integrated into the Kuomintang's army in the Second Sino-Japanese War, and it later evolved into the Central Military Commission after the 7th National Congress of the Chinese Communist Party in 1945. In this period, the committee was always chaired by Mao Zedong.

=== People's Republic of China ===
After the proclamation of the People's Republic of China on 1 October 1949, military leadership was transferred to a government body, the People's Revolutionary Military Commission of the Central People's Government. (Note: Chinese: 中央人民政府人民革命軍事委員會; pinyin: Zhōngyāng Rénmín Zhèngfǔ Rénmín Gémìng Jūnshì Wěiyuánhuì) During this period, there was no separate supreme military leadership organ of the CCP. In 1954, the CCP Central Military Commission was re-established, while state military authority was transferred to the National Defense Commission chaired by the Chairman of China with the adoption of the 1954 constitution.

As Mao Zedong was also the Chairman of the Chinese Communist Party and led military affairs as a whole, the CMC and NDC's day-to-day work was carried out by its first-ranking vice-chairman, a post which was occupied by Lin Biao until his death in 1971, then by Ye Jianying. As a consequence of the Cultural Revolution, the Party CMC became the sole military overseeing body, and the National Defence Council was abolished in 1975.

Deng Xiaoping's efforts to institutionally separate the CCP and the state led to the establishment of today's State CMC, which was created in 1982 by the state constitution in order to formalize the role of the military within the government structure. Both the National Defense Commission and State CMC have been described as 'consultative' bodies. Contrarily to the National Defense Council, however, the party and state CMCs are almost identical in leadership, composition, and powers.

After the United States bombing of the Chinese embassy in Belgrade during the NATO bombing of Yugoslavia, Jiang Zemin instructed the CMC to strengthen the PLA. The CMC began a broad effort to reform its doctrine, operations, and equipment in anticipation of what Chinese leadership expected would be an increasingly hostile United States.

During his tenure as Chairman of the CMC, Hu Jintao generally took a hands-off approach. He provided broad policy guidance but few detailed instructions. Academic Ji You writes, "The top [PLA] brass supported Hu's CPC leadership in exchange for maintaining their autonomy in PLA administration and operations." During this time, Guo Boxiong and Xu Caihou sought to minimize Hu's authority on the CMC by concealing information, selectively reporting important information, and consolidating their influence over the personnel appointment process. They also sought to marginalize Xi Jinping, Hu's apparent successor. Hu did not punish Guo and Xu before their retirement, deeming it more important to maintain CMC unity.

In 2016, the four traditional general departments were dissolved by order of Chairman Xi Jinping, and in their place 15 new departments were created as part of the ongoing modernization of the PLA.

Xi has reinforced the boundary between the Politburo and the CMC.

== Functions ==
According to the Law of the People's Republic of China on National Defense, the CMC exercises leadership over border, maritime, air and other critical security defense. The CMC has the ultimate command authority over the armed forces of the People's Republic of China, including the People's Liberation Army (PLA), the People's Armed Police (PAP), and the Militia. It makes decisions regarding strategy, development, equipment, personnel and funding.

In China's state-party-military tripartite political system, the CMC itself is a decision-making body whose day-to-day affairs are not nearly as transparent as that of the Central Committee or the State Council. As one of China's three main decision-making bodies the relative influence of the CMC can vary depending on the time period and the leaders. The CCP practices a strict division of power in military affairs between the Politburo and the CMC; no civilian Politburo member is authorized to handle military affairs except for the CMC chairman, while military personnel are forbidden to intervene in civilian affairs.

Unlike in most countries, the Central Military Commission is not an organizational equivalent of other government ministries. Although China does have a Ministry of National Defense, it exists solely for liaison with foreign militaries and does not have command authority.

== Structure ==
There are two separate commissions; the Central Military Commission of the Chinese Communist Party and the Central Military Commission of the People's Republic of China. However, under the arrangement of "one institution with two names", both commissions have identical personnel, organization and function. (Note: Other communist states typically only had state military commissions exclusively composed of party members, such as the GDR's National Defence Council, which was however preceded by a party commission.) The commission's parallel hierarchy allows the CCP to supervise the political and military activities of the PLA, including issuing directives on senior appointments, troop deployments and arms spending. The CMC is extremely opaque, and its meetings are almost never publicized.

The CMC is composed of a chairman, vice chairpersons, and other members. The CMC chairman is usually concurrently the CCP general secretary. Per the chairman responsibility system, all significant issues in national defense and Army building are planned and decided by the CMC chairman, who holds the final deciding vote on major military decisions and oversees the CMC's and the military's leadership and operations. Other members of the CMC are the chairman's top aides to assist his final say over key CMC matters. The chairman is the decision-maker regarding the decisions to enter war, formulates China's national defense strategy, orders troop deployments, and decides on research and development and the induction of strategic weapons. The chairman also has the exclusive right to appoint of CMC members and commanders up to the level of a headquarters department, military region, and service command. According to CMC work rules, other members of the commission are required to maintain absolute political loyalty to the chairman and implement all directives issued, as well as seek approval for travel, leave and public appearances and provide regular reports of their activities.

=== Election ===
The members of the Party CMC are elected by the CCP's Central Committee. In practice, membership is very closely controlled by the CCP's Politburo Standing Committee. Similarly, the state constitution states that the State CMC is elected by the National People's Congress (NPC) and theoretically reports to the NPC and its Standing Committee, but is in practice indistinguishable from the Party CMC.

=== Departments ===
Prior to 2016, the PLA was governed by four general departments. These were abolished after military reforms in 2015 by order of Chairman Xi Jinping, replaced with 15 departments that report directly to the CMC. The new 15 departments are:

1. General Office (Deputy Theater Grade)
2. Joint Staff Department (CMC Member Grade)
3. Political Work Department (CMC Member Grade)
4. Discipline Inspection Commission (CMC Member Grade)
5. Politics and Legal Affairs Commission (Theater Grade)
6. Logistic Support Department (Deputy Theater Grade)
7. Equipment Development Department (Deputy Theater Grade)
8. Training Administration Department (Deputy Theater Grade)
9. National Defense Mobilization Department (Deputy Theater Grade)
10. Science and Technology Commission (Deputy Theater Grade)
11. Office for Strategic Planning (Corps Grade)
12. Office for Reform and Organizational Structure (Corps Grade)
13. Office for International Military Cooperation (Corps Grade)
14. Audit Office (Corps Grade)
15. Agency for Offices Administration (Corps Grade)

The Joint Staff Department is the nerve center of the entire Chinese military command and control system, responsible for daily administrative duties of the CMC. The General Office processes all CMC communications and documents, coordinate meetings, and convey orders and directives to other subordinate organs.

=== Joint control organs ===
The Central Military Commission Joint Operations Command Center was separated from the Joint Staff in the 2015 reforms and made directly commanded by the CMC. As well as serving as the command center for overall PLA joint operations, it supervises the Joint Operation Command Organs of each of the five command theaters.

=== Former post of Secretary-General ===
The Commission included the post of secretary-general until 1992. This post was held by Yang Shangkun (1945–1954), Huang Kecheng (1954–1959), Luo Ruiqing (1959–1966), Ye Jianying (1966–1977), Luo Ruiqing (1977–1979), Geng Biao (1979–1981), Yang Shangkun (1981–1989) and Yang Baibing (1989–1992).

== Members ==
According to military regulations, the chairman of the CMC shall be conferred with no military rank, while vice chairmen and members of the CMC are ex officio conferred the rank of general or admiral. The make-up of the current Central Military Commission of the CCP was determined at the 20th Party Congress held in October 2022; the state commission was confirmed at the 1st Session of the 14th National People's Congress.

Both Zhang Youxia and Liu Zhenli were officially removed in August 2026, having been under investigation since January, effectively leaving only two members of the CMC: the chairman and one Vice Chairman.

CMC Chairman
Xi Jinping, also General Secretary of the Chinese Communist Party, President of China

CMC Vice Chairmen (1)

1. General Zhang Shengmin, also Secretary of the Discipline Inspection Commission

== High command ==
As of March 2026, China's Ministry of National Defense lists its high command as:

Institution	Leaders
Membership of the Central Military Commission
Chairman	Xi Jinping (习近平)
Vice Chairmen	Zhang Shengmin (张升民)
Members	Vacant
CMC Functional Departments
General Office	Director: Vacant
Joint Staff Department	Chief of Staff: PLAGF Lt Gen Zhu Chuansheng (祝传生)
Political Work Department	Acting Director: Chen Demin (陈德民)
Logistic Support Department	Dept Head: PLAAF Lt Gen Chen Chi (陈炽); Political Commissioner: Vacant
Equipment Development Department	Dept Head: Vacant; Political Commissioner: Vacant
Training Administration Department	Director: PLAAF Lt Gen Liu Di (刘镝); Political Commissioner: Vacant
National Defense Mobilization Department	Director: PLAGF Lt Gen Zhang Like (张立克); Political Commissioner: Vacant
Discipline Inspection Commission	Secretary: PLAGF Gen Zhang Shuguang(张曙光)
Politics and Legal Affairs Commission	Secretary: Vacant
Science and Technology Commission	Director: Vacant
Office for Strategic Planning	Director: PLAGF Maj Gen Shen Fangwu (沈方吾)
Office for Reform and Organizational Structure	Director: PLAGF Maj Gen Li Pengyi (李鹏翼)
Office for International Military Cooperation	Director: PLAAF Maj Gen Li Bin (李斌)
Audit Office	Chief Auditor: Vacant
Agency for Offices Administration	Dept Head: PLAAF Maj Gen Liu Changchun (刘长春); Political Commissioner: PLAAF Maj Gen Han Guoqi (韩国启)
Joint Operations Command Center
JOCC	Commander-in-Chief: Xi Jinping (习近平) Executive Deputy Director: Dong Li (董立)
Theater Commands
Eastern Theater Command	Commander: PLAAF Gen Yang Zhibin (杨志斌); Political Commissioner: PLARF Lt Gen Zhang Jichun (张继春) (Acting)
Southern Theater Command	Commander: PLAGF Gen Wu Yanan (吴亚男); Political Commissioner: PLAGF Gen Wang Wenquan (王文全)
Western Theater Command	Commander: PLAAF Lt Gen Wen Junfei (文俊飞) (Acting); Political Commissioner:PLARF Lt Gen Zhang Shaoying (张韶颖) (Acting)
Northern Theater Command	Commander: PLAGF Lt Gen Peng Jingtang (彭京堂) (Acting); Political Commissioner: PLAGF Gen Zheng Xuan (郑璇)
Central Theater Command	Commander: PLAAF Gen Han Shengyan (韩胜延); Political Commissioner: PLAGF Gen Xu Deqing (徐德清)
PLA Branches
PLA Ground Force	Commander: PLAGF Lt Gen Cai Zhijun (蔡志军) (Acting); Political Commissioner: PLAGF Lt Gen Zheng Yanpo (郑堰坡) (Acting)
PLA Navy	Commander: PLAN Adm Hu Zhongming (胡中明); Political Commissioner: PLAN Vice Adm Hu Yuhai (胡瑜海) (Acting)
PLA Air Force	Commander: PLAAF Gen Wang Gang (王刚); Political Commissioner: PLAAF Lt Gen Shi Honggan (史洪干) (Acting)
PLA Rocket Force	Commander: PLARF Gen Lei Kai (雷凯) (Acting); Political Commissioner: PLARF Gen Xu Xisheng (徐西盛)
PLA Arms
Aerospace Force	Commander: PLAGF Lt Gen Hao Weizhong (郝卫中); Political Commissioner: Vacant
Cyberspace Force	Commander: Vacant; Political Commissioner: PLAAF Lt Gen Han Xiaodong (韩晓东)
Information Support Force	Commander: PLAGF Lt Gen Bi Yi (毕毅); Political Commissioner: Vacant
Joint Logistics Support Force	Commander: Vacant; Political Commissioner: Vacant
CMC Directly Subordinated Academic Institutions
Academy of Military Sciences	Dean: PLAGF Gen Yang Xuejun (杨学军); Political Commissioner: PLAGF Gen Ling Huanxin (凌焕新)
National Defense University	Principal: PLAGF Gen Xiao Tianliang (肖天亮); Political Commissioner: PLAN Vice Adm Xia Zhihe (夏志和)
National University of Defense Technology	Principal: PLAGF Maj Gen Lei Yongjun (雷勇军); Political Commissioner: PLAGF Maj Gen Zhang Zhan (张战)
Headquarters of the People's Armed Police Force
People's Armed Police	Acting Commander: PAP Lt Gen Cao Junzhang (曹均章); Political Commissioner: Vacant
