= Law of the People's Republic of China on National Defense =

Law of China

Standing Committee of the National People's Congress
- Passed by: Standing Committee of the National People's Congress
- Passed: 14 March 1997
- Signed by: President Jiang Zemin
- Signed: 14 March 1997
- Commenced: 14 March 1997
- Introduced by: State Council of China and the Central Military Commission
- Status: In force

Law of the People's Republic of China on National Defense
- Simplified Chinese: 中华人民共和国国防法
- Traditional Chinese: 中華人民共和國國防法
Transcriptions
Standard Mandarin
- Hanyu Pinyin: Zhōnghuá Rénmín Gònghéguó Guófáng Fǎ

The Law of the People's Republic of China on National Defense is a Chinese legislation concerning national defense. It was passed by the Standing Committee of the National People's Congress on 14 March 1997 and came into effect in the same day. It was revised on 27 August 2009 and 26 December 2020.

== Legislative history ==
The law was passed by the Standing Committee of the National People's Congress on 14 March 1997 and came into effect in the same day. It was revised on 27 August 2009 and 26 December 2020.

== Provisions ==
Article 7 of the law states that "It is the sacred duty of every citizen of the People’s Republic of China to defend the motherland and resist aggression".

Article 15 states that the Central Military Commission "directs all the armed forces of the country".

Article 21 states that the armed forces of the People's Republic of China are "subject to the leadership of the Chinese Communist Party". Article 22 states that the armed forces of the People’s Republic of China are composed of the People’s Liberation Army, the People’s Armed Police Force and the Militia.

== See also ==
- Law of the People's Republic of China
