= General Office =

Important administrative political organs in certain communist parties

A General Office (also known as "administrative office") is an important administrative political organ in communist party organizations and communist countries (such as China, Laos, and Vietnam). Generally speaking, the General Office serves administrative functions for its parent organization, such as filing documents, recording meeting minutes, internal and external communications, scheduling, and agenda preparation.

In China the General Office can, occasionally, serve coordination and project management duties, but acts only within the bounds as dictated by their superiors and cannot make executive decisions on its own. The General Office typically reports directly to the head of an organization. General Offices may be created for very specific initiatives. For example, the State Council (government) of China has a Legal Affairs (General) Office, and a Hong Kong and Macau Affairs (General) Office.

Almost all organizations directly under the Central Committee of the Chinese Communist Party have a corresponding General Office.

== Examples ==
- General Office of the Chinese Communist Party
- General Office of the State Council of the People's Republic of China
- General Office of the Central Military Commission
