= Deepening National Defense and Military Reform =

Chinese Communist Party military reforms

- Simplified Chinese: 深化国防和军队改革
- Traditional Chinese: 深化國防和軍隊改革
- Literal meaning: Deepening national defense and military reform
Transcriptions
Standard Mandarin
- Hanyu Pinyin: shēnhuà guófáng hé jūnduì gǎigé

The Deepening National Defense and Military Reform is a major restructuring of the People's Liberation Army (PLA), launched in 2015 by Xi Jinping, the General Secretary of the Chinese Communist Party since 2012. It flattened the command structure and allowed the CCP to have more control over the military, with the aim of strengthening the combat capability of the PLA.

== History ==
Reform of China's defense and military structure began after Xi Jinping became the General Secretary of the Chinese Communist Party and the Chairman of the Central Military Commission in 2012. Under Xi's administration, China created the CCP National Security Commission and established an air defense identification zone in the East China Sea in 2013. In 2014, Xi told the CCP Politburo that the PLA should operate by integrating multiple services.

In January 2014, Chinese senior military officers said that the People's Liberation Army (PLA) was planning to reduce the number of military regions from seven to five Theater Commands to have joint command with the ground, naval, air and rocket forces. This is planned to change their concept of operations from primarily ground-oriented defense to mobile and coordinated movements of all services and to enhance offensive air and naval capabilities. The coastal areas would be turned into three military regions, each with a joint operations command (Jinan, Nanjing and Guangzhou) for projecting power into the Yellow Sea, East China Sea and South China Sea. The four other inland military regions (Shenyang, Beijing, Chengdu and Lanzhou) will be streamlined into two military areas mainly for organizing forces for operations. The change was projected to occur through 2019.

Xi announced a reduction of 300,000 troops from the PLA in September 2015, bringing its size to 2 million troops. Xi described this as a gesture of peace, while analysts such as Rory Medcalf have said that the cut was done to reduce costs as well as part of PLA's modernization. Around half of the 300,000 troops were officers, and most were from the People's Liberation Army Ground Force. The "deepening national defense and military reform" was announced in November 2015 at a plenary session of the Central Military Commission (CMC)'s Central Leading Group for Military Reform. They were expected to be long and extensive that aimed at turning the PLA into a modern military on par with international standards. Before the reforms were announced, Xi said the CMC should directly control the military and new regional commands be created. On 1 January 2016, the CMC issued its "Deepening National Defense and Military Reform" document, which called for major restructuring of the military with the goal of modernizing and enhancing the military's operational capabilities.

The four traditional departments of the military (General Political, General Logistics, General Armament and General Staff Departments) were replaced by 15 new departments, commissions, and offices led by the CMC. Seven departments were created (General Office, Joint Staff Department, Political Work Department, Equipment Development Department, Training and Management Department, Logistics Support Department, and National Defense Mobilization Department). The three Commissions created were the Discipline Inspection Commission, the Politics and Law Commission, and the Science and Technology Commission. The five operational offices created were the Strategic Planning Office, the Reform and Organization Office, the International Military Cooperation Office, the Audit Bureau, and the Organ Affairs General Management Bureau. On 1 February 2016, China replaced its system of seven military regions with newly established Theater Commands: Northern, Southern, Western, Eastern, and Central. In the prior system, operations were segmented by military branch and region. In contrast, each Theater Command is intended to function as a unified entity with joint operations across different military branches.

== See also ==
- Outline of the military history of the People's Republic of China
- History of the People's Liberation Army
- Modernization of the People's Liberation Army
