= August 1st Building =

Military building in Beijing, China

- 八一大楼
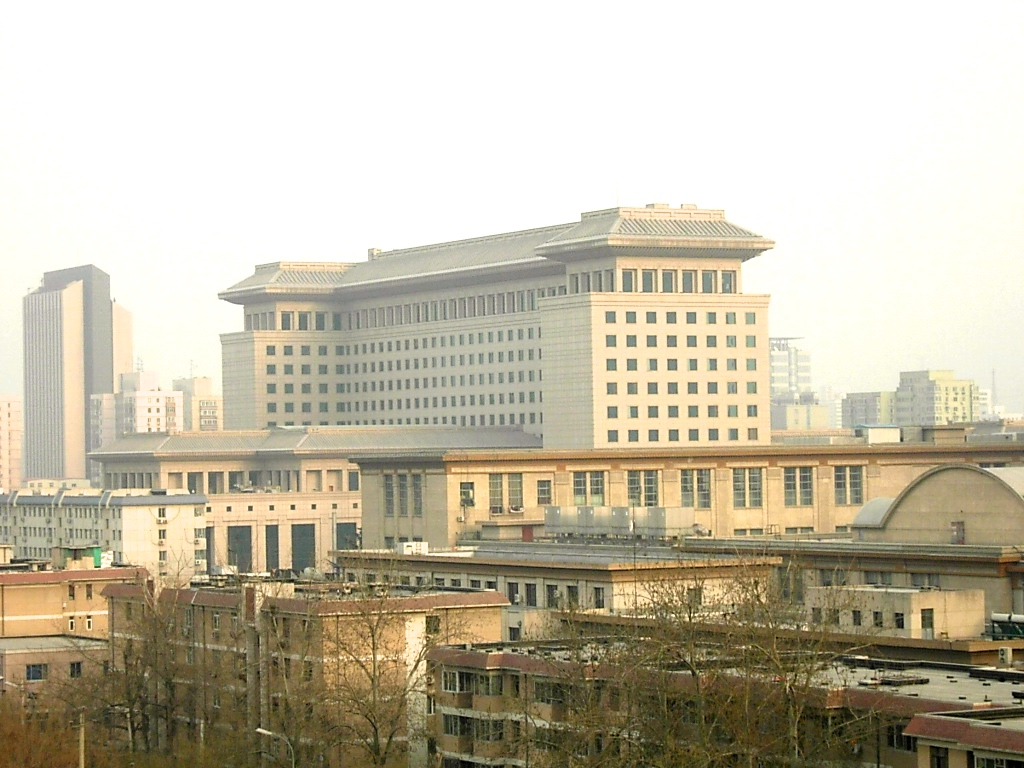
- August 1st Building
- Interactive map of the August 1st Building area
- Alternative names: Great Hall of the People's Liberation Army (解放军的人民大会堂)

General information
- Location: No. 7 Fuxing Road, Haidian District, Beijing, China
- Coordinates: 39.9075°N 116.321°E
- Current tenants: Central Military Commission 中央军委办公厅
- Construction started: 2 March 1997
- Completed: 30 October 1997 (structure); July 1999 (opening)
- Cost: 779 million RMB
- Landlord: August 1st Building Management Service of the General Office of the CMC

Technical details
- Floor count: 12 floors, 2 basements
- Floor area: 90,255m^{2}

Design and construction
- Architecture firm: 4th Design Institute of the Engineering Corps of the General Staff Department

The August 1st Building, also known as the Bayi Building (Note: Bayi is the pinyin reading for the characters "八一", or "8-1", meaning August 1st) located at No. 7 Fuxing Road (Beijing) in Haidian District, Beijing, is a military office building in Beijing, China. It was planned to be the main office for the agencies of the Central Military Commission and the Ministry of Defense. It has become known as the "Great Hall of the People's Liberation Army" as it is the venue of most military diplomatic events and important military meetings.

== Description ==
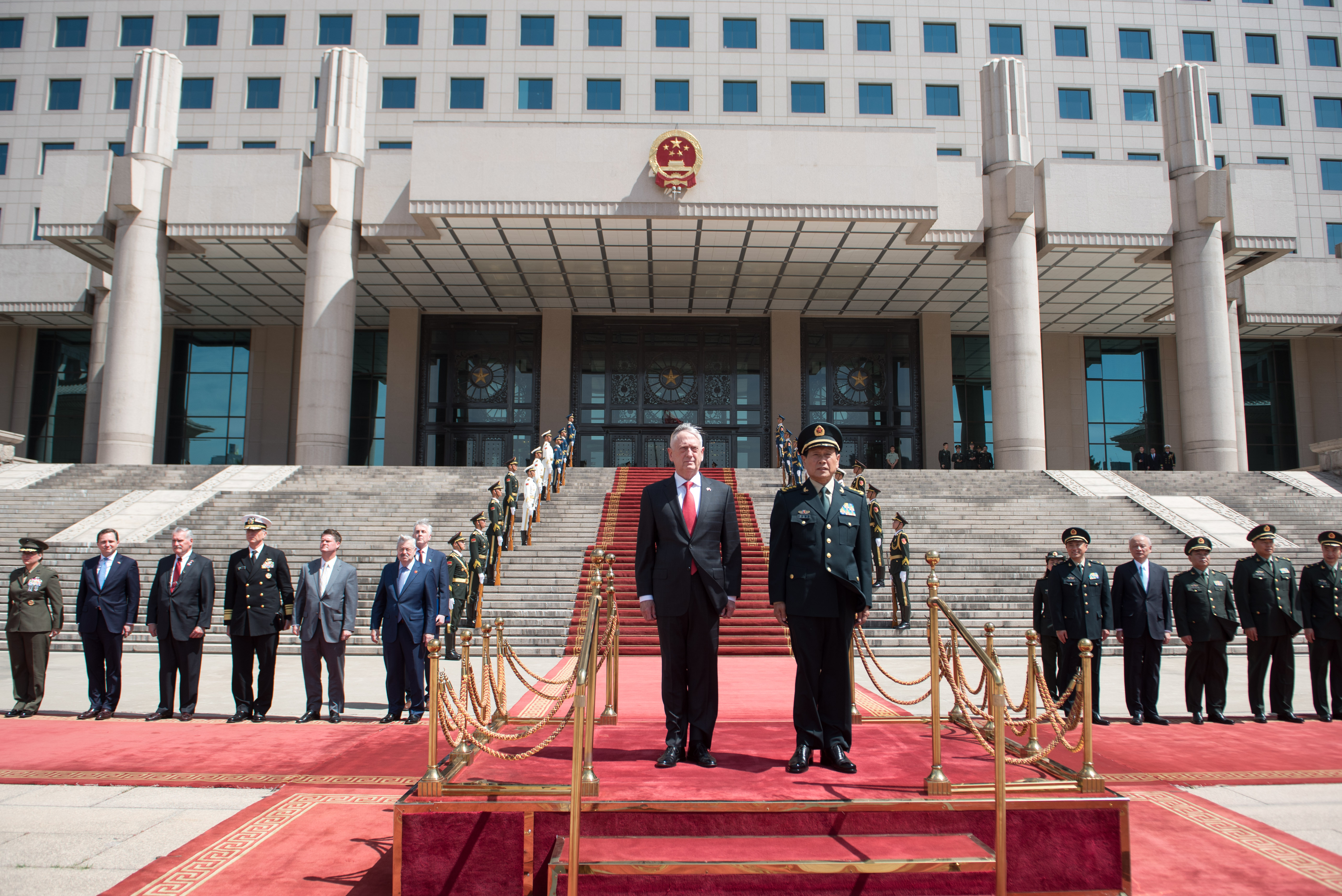
Former Minister of Defense Wei Fenghe holds a welcoming ceremony for Secretary of Defense James Mattis on the August 1st Square, in front of the August 1st Building, on 27 June 2018.

The first PLA main office in Beijing was located at 20 Jingshan Qianjie, also known as the "Three Gates" complex (三座门 pinyin:Sānzuòmén). (Note: not to be confused with the Three Gates inside the Forbidden City, or the Three Gates in the Temple of Heaven) These facilities were fairly small, so since the 1980s there were plans to build a larger complex. The August 1st building project ("844 Project") started in 1988 under the direction of recently retired head of the PLA General Office, Fu Xuezheng. The construction project broke ground on 2 March 1997, the main structure was completed by October 30, 1997, basically completed the facade and equipment installation by the end of 1998, and the building was fully completed at the end of July 1999. The total investment of the project was RMB 779 million, with a total floor area of 90,255m^{2}, for an average cost of 8,631.9RMB/m^{2}.

The August 1st Building was designed by the Fourth Design Institute of the General Staff Department. The main building has 12 floors above the ground and 2 basements. To the south side of the main building there is the August 1st Square, where review ceremonies are held. To the north side there are 12,600m^{2} of green space. On the west side of the building is the Military Museum of the Chinese People's Revolution, and to the south, across the Fuxing Road, is the main building of the China State Railway Group (formerly the Ministry of Railways).

The August 1st Building is managed by the Bayi Building Management Service of the General Office of the Central Military Commission.

Hardened (nuclear resistant) facilities for military command agencies (such as the headquarters of the Joint Operations Command) are located inside the Western Hills. China is possibly now building a large new underground administrative and command center in the nearby Qinglonghu area.

== See also ==
- General Office of the Central Military Commission
- Jade Spring Hill, Western Hills
- The Pentagon
