= Ministry of National Defense (China) =

Chinese government ministry

Ministry of National Defense of the People's Republic of China
- 中华人民共和国国防部; Zhōnghuá Rénmín Gònghéguó Guófángbù
- National Emblem of China

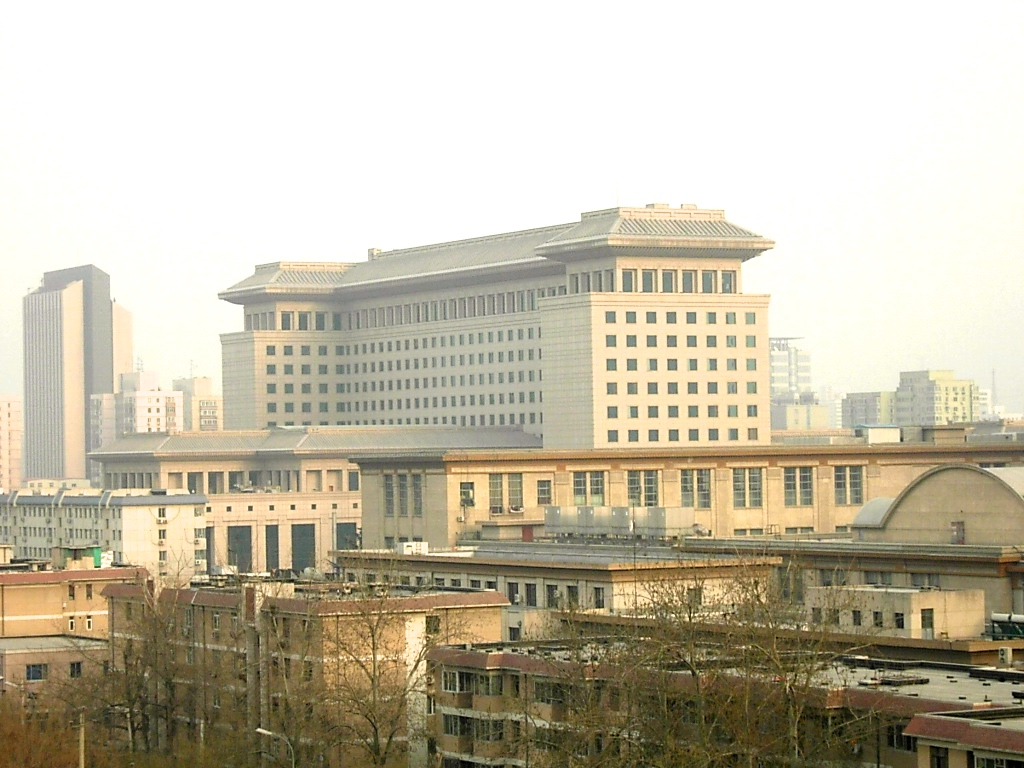
- August 1st Building

Agency overview
- Formed: 28 September 1954; 72 years ago
- Type: Constituent Department of the State Council (cabinet-level executive department)
- Jurisdiction: Government of China
- Headquarters: August 1st Building, Fuxing Road, Beijing
- Minister responsible: Admiral Dong Jun, Minister of National Defense
- Parent agency: Central Military Commission
- Website: eng.mod.gov.cn (in English)

Chinese name
- Simplified Chinese: 中华人民共和国国防部
- Traditional Chinese: 中華人民共和國國防部
Transcriptions
Standard Mandarin
- Hanyu Pinyin: Zhōnghuá Rénmín Gònghéguó Guófángbù

Alternative Chinese name
- Simplified Chinese: 国防部
- Traditional Chinese: 國防部
Transcriptions
Standard Mandarin
- Hanyu Pinyin: Guófángbù

The Ministry of National Defense of the People's Republic of China is the second-ranked constituent department under the State Council. It is headed by the Minister of National Defense.

The Ministry was established in 1954. Unlike in other countries, the Ministry of National Defense does not have operational command over the Chinese military including the People's Liberation Army (PLA), which is instead commanded by the Central Military Commission (CMC). The work of the Ministry and the Minister are primarily diplomatic in nature, generally functioning as a liaison representing the CMC and PLA when dealing with foreign militaries. It additionally holds press briefings and publishes news about military affairs.

== Overview ==
The MND was set up according to a decision adopted by the 1st Session of the 1st National People's Congress in 1954. In contrast to practice in other nations, the MND does not exercise command authority over the army including the People's Liberation Army (PLA), which is instead subordinate to the Central Military Commission (CMC). The MND serves as a liaison representing the CMC and PLA when dealing with foreign militaries in military exchange and cooperation. It has the primary responsibility for China's defense attachés and is the institutional point of contact for foreign defense attachés assigned to China. It is additionally responsible for holding press briefings and publishing news about military affairs.

== Structure ==
The Ministry is headed by a Minister of National Defense; unlike in other countries, the minister does not have command authority over the army, generally exercising diplomatic functions. However, until December 2023, the office has always been held by a member of the CMC. With the removal of Li Shangfu in December 2023, the MND has not had a seat on the CMC.

== See also ==
- Defense diplomacy
