= Civil Air Defense Bureau =

Civil air defense department

Civil Air Defense Bureau of the National Defense Mobilization Department of the Central Military Commission
- 中央军委国防动员部人防局

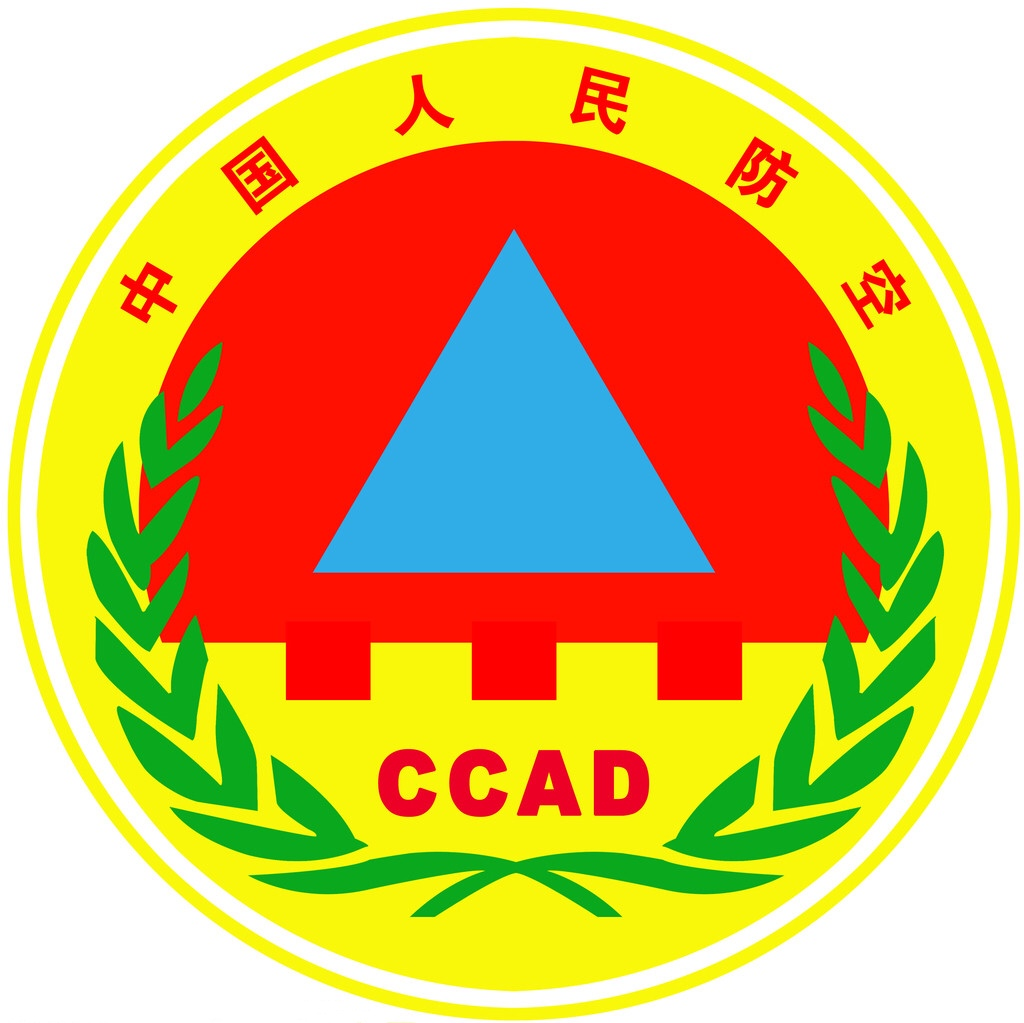
- China Civil Air Defense Logo

Agency overview
- Formed: 2016
- Type: Second-level functional department of the Central Military Commission
- Jurisdiction: People's Liberation Army
- Headquarters: Beijing
- Agency executives: PLAGF Maj Gen Yin Yong (殷勇), Director; PLAGF Maj Gen Yang Qingshan (杨青山), Party Secretary
- Parent department: National Defense Mobilization Department

The Civil Air Defense Bureau of the National Defense Mobilization Department of the Central Military Commission (CCAD for short) is located in Beijing City and is a subordinate bureau of the National Defense Mobilization Department of the Central Military Commission, of Corps grade. It is in charge of executing the CMC policies regarding air civil defense, and more recently, disaster and contingency preparation in general.

== History ==
The first institution related to civil air defense in China was established in October 1950, as the "Central Civil Air Defense Preparatory Committee". Air Defense was an issue of enormous concern for the PRC all throughout its first decades, with the threat of American and then Soviet mass bombing being a very clear and present danger. Militia forces were often trained not just in the use of AA weaponry, but on how to protect potential targets, firefight and rescue, and how to disguise important facilities.

But it was after the Sino-Soviet split, and in particular after the 1969 border clashes that there was a positive boom of air civil defense facilities. On orders of Mao Zedong, food and supplies started being stockpiled, and complex systems of shelters and tunnels started to be built in cities all over China. These shelter complexes grew so large that became known as "subterranean cities" (地下城 pinyin: dìxià chéng) and the "underground Great Wall" (地下长城 pinyin: dìxià chángchéng). Around 100 different cities built these extensive complexes, the most impressive being the immense Underground City of Beijing, purported to be able to shelter half the population of the city. (Note: The other half was supposed to be evacuated to the Western Hills) The intent of these works was not just passive defense, but to transform each city into a fortress, "a thousand Stalingrads" able to fight back even after being bombed into rubble.

With the end of the Cold War, the sense of urgency vanished and most of these underground cities were left to decay or were repurposed. The concern for civil defense did not disappear, though. In November 1994, the National Defense Mobilization Commission was established, and the original "National Civil Air Defense Committee Office" was changed to the "National Defense Mobilization Commission Civil Air Defense Office". The "Civil Air Defense Law of the People's Republic of China" was promulgated in 1996 and implemented in 1997. The law specifies a three-level system of priority for defensive works, giving higher rankings to cities and high-value assets depending on their importance and their vulnerability.

The National Civil Air Defense Office was originally the civilian half of a "two institutions, one office" organization that shared its staff with the Operations Department of the General Staff of the People's Liberation Army. In the 2015 People's Republic of China military reforms, the General Staff of the People's Liberation Army was abolished in January 2016, and the National Defense Mobilization Department was established. The nameplate of the National Civil Air Defense Office was moved to the Civil Air Defense Bureau of the National Defense Mobilization Department of the Central Military Commission.

Before the reform in 2016, the "Civil Air Defense Bureau" was one of the units of the General Staff Operations Department (GSDOD). As part of the military reforms, the National Defense Mobilization Department of the Central Military Commission was established in January 2016. The NDMD then relocated the Civil Defense Bureau under its jurisdiction and renamed it the "National Defense Mobilization Department Civil Air Defense Bureau". Yin Yong, former director of the old GSDOD Civil Air Defense Bureau, became the first director of the new NDMD Civil Air Defense Bureau. (he was also appointed the head of the Civil Air Defense Office soon after, to complete the realignment).

== Duties ==
The main responsibilities of the National Civil Air Defense Office (and thus of the Air Defense Bureau) according to the Civil Air Defense Law are:

1. Be responsible for the organization, implementation and supervision of laws and regulations, in particular the "People's Republic of China Civil Air Defense Law".
2. Research and propose the principles, policies, laws, and regulations of civil air defense work.
3. According to the national economic and social development plan and the needs of national defense construction, formulate the development strategy and medium- and long-term development plan for civil air defense, prepare the annual plan for civil air defense work, and organize its implementation after approval.
4. Formulate the protection categories and protection standards for key cities of national civil air defense, and implement them after approval.
5. In conjunction with relevant departments, review and approve the plan for combining civil air defense construction with urban construction, review the implementation of civil air defense requirements and civil air defense construction plans in the overall urban plan, and supervise and inspect the civil air defense construction of cities and economic targets in accordance with the law.
6. Organize and carry out civil air defense organization and command.
7. Organize and manage the construction of civil air defense communication alarms.
8. Organize and manage the construction of civil air defense projects.
9. Organize and carry out civil air defense publicity and education.

The mission has drifted somewhat since 1997. According to at least one of the CCAD branches (Shandong), the overall goal of building a civil air defense system is to:

Establish a unified and efficient organizational command system, a rationally laid out protection engineering system, a sensitive and reliable communication alarm system, a lean and capable professional team system, a strong population evacuation system, and a modern scientific research and talent training system, and strive to improve civil air defense's (Note: The usual word for "civil air defense (Chinese: 人民防空; pinyin: rénmín fángkōng), usually shortened to "Chinese: 人防; pinyin: rénfáng is meant to apply to air raid defense as part of war preparations. With the extension of the concept to peacetime preparation against disasters, the relative neologism Chinese: 民防; pinyin: mínfáng is used to differentiate the concepts), overall anti-destruction capability, rapid response capability, emergency rescue capability, and self-development capability in order to cope with modern wars and major disasters and accidents, and effectively protect the safety of life and property of the country and the people.

Making it very explicit that the remit of the system now includes preparation for disasters, accidents, and contingencies.

=== Mobilization and civil-military fusion ===
The CCAD is part of the mobilization system of China, and sees its work accordingly. Civil Defense preparation is explicitly expected to involve mobilizing the general public, companies, and other organizations by local governments (under NDMD guidance) to engage in activities such as stockpiling vital supplies, and hardening key economic and social "breakpoints" like communication facilities, power infrastructure, etc. The vulnerability of China's extremely dense cities has never been too far behind the military planners' minds.

=== Construction of hardened facilities ===
The civil defense law requires real estate developers to set aside a certain percentage of built area space to air raid resistant structures, normally bomb shelter basements. Other mandates require the hardening, for dual defense and ordinary use, of a variety of constructions, from underground car parks, to schools, to the main cities' burgeoning subway systems.

The CCAD has the responsibility of verifying the building standards of these facilities, and ensuring that a sufficient amount of dual-use shelters are in fact built (plus some primary shelters in some jurisdiction), a task usually assigned to the local CCAD's quality supervision stations. (Note: despite the rather obvious and large possibilities for corruption that these mandates bring, the CCAD has not been caught in a major disclosed scandal as of yet (2024)) Dual use structures are highly popular among local governments as they allow them to add community amenities as a defense budget line. The unofficial goal of 1 sq m of shelter space per person has been formally achieved by around a hundred jurisdictions.

=== General disaster prevention ===
The peacetime role of the rather costly civil air defense system is its usefulness as a preparation for natural disasters and accidents. Floods, China's most regular natural bane, are both a threat to underground facilities and a possible use for pre-prepared, hardened, drained, and airtight facilities.

Most obviously still, the CCAD's notoriously expensive air raid siren system is very geographically extensive, even in rural areas (the six time six-seconds blares during emergency drills are a familiar experience in most of China). Separately, the China Meteorological Administration (中国气象局) has developed since 2011 an extensive Weather Early Warning System (气象预警系统) using SMS, smartphone apps, internet, and broadcasting media that, critically, operates at national, provincial, prefecture, and county levels. China's public early warning information coverage rate reached 85.8% by 2017.

The National Early Warning Center (国家预警信息发布中心) has extended its reach from extreme weather conditions to four categories: natural disasters, accidental disasters, public health events, and public safety. Interconnecting this system with the CCAD's system is an obvious opportunity, and has been achieved in some provinces, but as of 2020, not yet at a full national level. Linking the systems to satellite communications is another desirable future development.

== Structure ==
The CCAD offices are co-located with each jurisdiction's National Defense Mobilization Office. Each local people's government will have the two offices attached to their system.

The structure of the local CCAD offices are generally (using the example of the Hunan CCAD)

=== Internal offices ===
- Comprehensive Coordination Department (综合协调处)
- Laws, Regulations, Publicity and Education Department (法规与宣传教育处)
- Planning and Supervision Department (规划督导处)
- Command and Informatization Department (指挥与信息化处)
- Engineering Management and Military Facilities Protection Department (工程管理与军事设施保护处)
- Equipment and Finance Department (装备财务处)
- Directly Affiliated Party Committees (Personnel Department) (直属机关党委 — 人事处)

=== Directly subordinate units ===
- Hunan Provincial Civil Air Defense Command Information Assurance Center (湖南省人防指挥信息保障中心)
- Department of Laws, Regulations, Publicity, and Education (法规与宣传教育处)
- Provincial Civil Air Defense Project Quality Supervision Station/Civil Air Defense Project Construction Cost Management Station (省人防工程质量监督站、省人防工程建设造价管理站)
- Hunan Civil Air Defense Agency Logistics Service Center (湖南省人防机关后勤服务中心)
- Provincial Engineering Management Office (省工程管理处)

== See also ==
- Civil Defense
- National Defense Mobilization Commission
- CMC National Defense Mobilization Department
- CMC Joint Staff Department Operations Bureau
