= People's Liberation Army Reserve Force =

Military reserve force of the Chinese People's Liberation Army (PLA)

- Chinese: 中国人民解放军预备役部队; pinyin: "zhōngguó rénmín jiěfàngjūn yùbèiyì bùduì"
- flag of the PLA
- Active: 1955－1957; 1983 -- present
- Country: China
- Allegiance: Chinese Communist Party
- Branch: People's Liberation Army
- Type: Military reserve force
- Role: Reinforcing regular army strength, ground operations, border and coastal protection
- Size: 510,000
- Part of: Central Military Commission
- Garrison/HQ: Beijing

Commanders
- Director of the National Defense Mobilization Department: PLAGF Lt Gen Liu Faqing (刘发庆)
- Political Commissar of the NDMD: PLAGF Lt Gen Wang Donghai (王东海)

Insignia
- Cap badge

- Shoulder badge

The Reserve Force of the People's Liberation Army is the military reserve force of the People's Liberation Army (PLA). It is composed of a trained force of (mostly retired veteran) civilians that retain an inactive military status, and are subject to fast mobilization. in case of wartime or other crises, at which time they are transferred to active duty and their units activated into full service.

The reserve forces are organized as full units with a small number of active servicemen as an organizational skeleton, plus a larger body of reserve officers and soldiers in call-up ready state. Reserve units follow the unified organization of the PLA and are entered into the official PLA TOEs and order of battle. The PLA reserve forces are directly under the leadership of the Central Military Commission (CMC). The National Defense Mobilization Department of the CMC manages the recruitment, unit assignment and mobilization structures.

== History ==
The reserve force of the People's Liberation Army of China was originally established with the formalization of the PLA structures in 1955, but was soon abolished in 1957. At the time, the concept of people's war essentially made the Militia into a de facto reserve force, and former PLA servicemen entered the militia as "cadre militia" when demobilized.

In 1983, the CMC decided to restore a formal PLA reserve force and officially named it the "People's Liberation Army Reserve Force", starting with a pilot unit in Jinzhou. In May 1984, the reserve force was included in the Military Service Law of the People's Republic of China. Initially, the reserve force was solely infantry units. After the 1990s, it developed into infantry, artillery, armor, engineering, communications, chemical defense and other services. When the People's Liberation Army Reserve Forces were first established, they were under the dual leadership of the military on the one hand, and the local Chinese Communist Party (CCP) committees and local People's Governments on the other. On 10 August 10, 1986, the reserve force was included in the organizational order of battle of the Chinese People's Liberation Army, and the division and regiment-level units of the reserve force were awarded designations and presented with Colours.

As part of the 2015 People's Republic of China military reform, from 1 July 2020, the reserve force began to be readjusted from dual military and civilian leadership to CMC leadership.

A new Reservist Law passed in 2022, and entered into effect on 1 March 2023. It eliminated the dual authority system, and for the first time excluded the Militia from the formal reserve force. The new law established a formal system of "selection, training, appointment, management, recruitment and retirement", with an explicit intent of recruiting and retaining a wider range of talents and specialists.

== Structure of the Reserve Force ==
=== Organization and control ===
The Reservists Law gives the Central Committee of the CCP and the Central Military Commission full and exclusive authority over the Reserve Force, with every department of the CMC having different obligations. The most central of those offices is the National Defense Mobilization Department, which is responsible for assigning reservists to units, and for calling them up when needed. Temporary call-up by Theater Commands seems to be possible for emergencies and disasters, as happened in the aftermath of typhoon Meranti in 2016, or by order of the central command as during the Anhui floods of 2020.

=== Reserve Service ===
Reservists are by law a distinct form of military service status, and the individual reservist status is distinct and independent from belonging to any reserve forces' formation. Before the new revised Military Service Law took effect on October 1, 2021, reserve personnel included four forms: pre-assignment to active forces, incorporation into reserve forces, incorporation into militia organizations for reserve service, and other forms of reserve service, a very wide definition. The new Reserve Service Law of 2022 define reservists exclusively as PRC citizens 18 and older who are "preassigned" to active duty units or are assigned to reserve units. That means that only those pre-registered, with a predetermined obligation to join a specific unit when mobilized, are classified as reserve personnel, thus excluding the militia.

The law also specified that reservists include both enlisted and officers, specifying that reserve officers can only be of company or field grade. There are no reserve general officers, meaning that the higher leadership of larger reserve units has to be active service staff assigned to the skeletal units.

=== Selection and Recruitment ===
Before the 2022 reforms, reserve officers were mainly selected from qualified veterans, local cadres, people's armed cadres, militia cadres, and technical personnel with local and military occupations. Reserve troops generally conducted 240 hours of military and political training every year. The new law indicates that the PLA will recruit reservists mainly from former PLA active duty personnel, and from professional and technical personnel that "meet the conditions for reserve service and have registered for reserve service." This last clause allows the possibility of non-veteran specialist reservists. It is also to be noted that entering the reserves is not automatic for soldiers ending their military service. The minimum term of the reserve service shall be four years.

=== Benefits for reservists ===
One of the main goals of the reforms was to improve the attractiveness of reserve duty. The new law clarified financial aid for training costs, and clarifies that reservists participating in training of active duty shall have the same medical insurance, benefits, and compensation as active duty member.

=== Reservist ranks and retirement ===
The law specifies the ranks and mandatory retirement ages for reserve officers and enlisted personnel, with age of retirement increasing with rank.

Ranks and Retirement Ages of Reserve Officers (Ground and Air)
| Reserve Grades | Reserve Ranks | Mandatory Retirement Age |
|---|---|---|
| Reserve Field Grade Officers | Reserve Senior Colonel | 60 |
| Reserve Field Grade Officers | Reserve Colonel | 60 |
| Reserve Field Grade Officers | Reserve Lieutenant Colonel | 60 |
| Reserve Field Grade Officers | Reserve Major | 60 |
| Reserve Company Grade Officers | Reserve Captain | Command track officers: 45 Technical track officers: 50 |
| Reserve Company Grade Officers | Reserve Lieutenant | Command track officers: 45 Technical track officers: 50 |
| Reserve Company Grade Officers | Reserve Second Lieutenant | Command track officers: 45 Technical track officers: 50 |

Ranks and Retirement Ages of Reserve NCOs and Junior Enlisted (Ground and Air)
| Reserve Grades | Reserve Ranks | Mandatory Retirement Age |
|---|---|---|
| Reserve Senior Grade NCOs | Reserve Master Sergeant Class One | 55 |
| Reserve Senior Grade NCOs | Reserve Master Sergeant Class Two | 55 |
| Reserve Senior Grade NCOs | Reserve Master Sergeant Class Three | 55 |
| Reserve Intermediate Grade NCOs | Reserve Sergeant First Class; Reserve Technical Sergeant | 55 |
| Reserve Intermediate Grade NCOs | Reserve Staff Sergeant | 45 |
| Reserve Junior Grade NCOs | Reserve Sergeant | 45 |
| Reserve Junior Grade NCOs | Reserve Corporal | 45 |
| Reserve Junior Enlisted | Reserve Private First Class; Reserve Airman 1st Class | 30 |
| Reserve Junior Enlisted | Reserve Private; Reserve Airman | 30 |

Ranks and Retirement Ages of Reserve Officers (Navy)
| Reserve Grades | Reserve Ranks | Mandatory Retirement Age |
|---|---|---|
| Reserve Field Grade Officers | Reserve Senior Captain | 60 |
| Reserve Field Grade Officers | Reserve Captain | 60 |
| Reserve Field Grade Officers | Reserve Commander | 60 |
| Reserve Field Grade Officers | Reserve Lieutenant Commander | 60 |
| Reserve Company Grade Officers | Reserve Lieutenant | Command track officers: 45 Technical track officers: 50 |
| Reserve Company Grade Officers | Reserve Lieutenant Junior Grade | Command track officers: 45 Technical track officers: 50 |
| Reserve Company Grade Officers | Reserve Ensign | Command track officers: 45 Technical track officers: 50 |

Ranks and Retirement Ages of Reserve NCOs and Junior Enlisted (Navy ratings)
| Reserve Grades | Reserve Ranks | Mandatory Retirement Age |
|---|---|---|
| Reserve Senior Grade NCOs | Reserve Master Chief Petty Officer Class 1 | 55 |
| Reserve Senior Grade NCOs | Reserve Master Chief Petty Officer Class 2 | 55 |
| Reserve Senior Grade NCOs | Reserve Senior Chief Petty Officer | 55 |
| Reserve Intermediate Grade NCOs | Reserve Chief Petty Officer | 55 |
| Reserve Intermediate Grade NCOs | Reserve Petty Officer 1st Class | 45 |
| Reserve Junior Grade NCOs | Reserve Petty Officer 2nd Class | 45 |
| Reserve Junior Grade NCOs | Reserve Petty Oficer 3rd Class | 45 |
| Reserve Junior Enlisted | Reserve Seaman | 30 |
| Reserve Junior Enlisted | Reserve Seaman Apprentice | 30 |

== Reserve Force Formations ==
The approximately 550,000 reservists of the PLA Reserve Force are assigned to units that are maintained in peacetime as skeletal organizations with a standing active service staff. The organization of these Reserve Force units is in flux. It is unclear, for instance, if the Reserve Forces will be fully "brigadized" like the regular PLA forces. As of 2023, they included at least the following, but the changes in structure of the Reserve Force are ongoing, and the TOEs change extremely fast. The Ministry of National Defense declared in 2020 that there would be a reduction of the Ground Force reserves and an increase of reserves for the other services, but it is unknown the degree that has occurred yet, and we have no clear indication of PLAAF or PLAN large-scale reserve units.

=== Maneuver Units ===
- 18 infantry divisions
- 4 infantry brigades
- 3 independent infantry regiments
- 2 armored regiments

=== Combat Support Units ===
- 3 artillery divisions
- 7 artillery brigades
- 15 engineering regiments
- 1 pontoon bridge brigade
- 3 pontoon bridge regiments
- 10 chemical defense regiments
- 10 signals regiments

=== Combat Service Support Units ===
- 9 logistics brigades
- 1 logistics regiment

=== Air Defense Units ===
- 17 Air defense divisions
- 8 Air defense brigades
- 8 Air defense regiments

== See also ==
- Militia (China)
