= Sheng Bin =

- 盛斌

Secretary-General of the National Defense Mobilization Commission
- In office December 2016 – December 2021
- Leader: Li Keqiang
- Preceded by: Wang Guanzhong
- Succeeded by: Liu Faqing

Head of the National Defense Mobilization Department of the Central Military Commission
- In office January 2016 – December 2021
- Leader: Xi Jinping
- Preceded by: Office established
- Succeeded by: Liu Faqing

Personal details
- Born: December 1958 (age 67) Yingkou County, Liaoning, China
- Party: Chinese Communist Party
- Education: PLA National Defence University; Combined Arms Academy of the Armed Forces of the Russian Federation

Military service
- Allegiance: People's Republic of China
- Branch/service: People's Liberation Army Ground Force
- Years of service: 1976–2021
- Rank: Lieutenant general

Sheng Bin (Chinese: 盛斌; pinyin: Shèng Bīn; born December 1958) is a lieutenant general in the People's Liberation Army of China who served as head of the National Defense Mobilization Department of the Central Military Commission from 2016 to 2021.

He is a member of the 19th Central Committee of the Chinese Communist Party. He was a delegate to the 12th National People's Congress.

== Biography ==
Sheng was born in Yingkou County (now Yingkou), Liaoning, in December 1958.

He enlisted in the People's Liberation Army (PLA) in December 1976. In 1994, he rose to become commander of the 205th Regiment of the 69th Division of the 23rd Group Army. In 1997, he entered the PLA National Defence University, where he graduated in 2000. In 2001, he studied at the Combined Arms Academy of the Armed Forces of the Russian Federation and was promoted to commander of the 69th Motorized Infantry Division after returning China. He served as chief of staff of the 40th Group Army in 2006 and then deputy commander in July 2007. In January 2009, he became deputy commander of the 39th Group Army. In March 2012, he was made commander of the Heilongjiang Military District, and held that office until December 2014, when he was appointed deputy commander of the Shenyang Military Region. He was commissioned as head of the National Defense Mobilization Department of the Central Military Commission in January 2016, concurrently serving as secretary-general of the National Defense Mobilization Commission since December of that same year.

He was promoted to the rank of major general (shaojiang) in July 2007 and lieutenant general (zhongjiang) in August 2016.

Military offices
| Preceded by Gao Chao | Commander of Heilongjiang Military District; 2012–2014 | Succeeded by Li Lei (李雷) |
| Preceded by Hou Jizhen | Deputy Commander of the Shenyang Military Region; 2014–2015 | Succeeded by Position revoked |
| New title | Head of the National Defense Mobilization Department of the Central Military Commission; 2016–2021 | Succeeded by Liu Faqing |
Government offices
| Preceded by Wang Guanzhong | Secretary-General of the National Defense Mobilization Commission; 2016–2021 | Succeeded by Liu Faqing |
