= Paramilitary forces of China =

Military units and formations apart from the People's Liberation Army

The paramilitary forces of the People's Republic of China are the military units and formations apart from the People's Liberation Army, the principal military force of the People's Republic of China. They are composed of three main forces, the People's Liberation Army Reserve Force, the People's Armed Police (PAP), and the Militia, and they act as auxiliaries to the active forces of the People's Liberation Army. They generally perform a wide range of roles.

== People's Armed Police ==
The People's Armed Police Force, abbreviated PAP, (Note: Chinese: 中国人民武装警察部队; pinyin: Zhōngguó Rénmín Wǔzhuāng Jǐngchá Bùduì; abbreviation: 武警 (Wǔjǐng)) is a Chinese gendarmerie organization primarily responsible for internal security, riot control, counter-terrorism, disaster response, law enforcement and maritime rights protection as well as providing support to the People's Liberation Army (PLA) during wartime.

=== Ministry of Public Security Active Service Forces ===
Ministry of Public Security Active Services Forces (MPSASF; Chinese: 公安现役部队) was a term referring to three separate agencies under the command of the Ministry of Public Security however were composed of People's Armed Police personnel. Its name comes from the fact that since the personnel were considered PAP personnel, they were treated as active service military personnel. After the Deepening the reform of the Party and state institutions in 2018, Border Defense Corps and Guard Corps personnel became People's Police personnel, while the China Fire Services were merged with the People's Armed Police Forestry Corps and became the China Fire and Rescue, making the use of the term defunct.

== Militia ==
The Militia (Chinese: 民兵; pinyin: Mínbīng) or Militia of China (Chinese: 中国民兵; pinyin: Zhōngguó Mínbīng) is the militia component of the national armed forces of the People's Republic of China, the other two parts being the People's Liberation Army (PLA) and the People's Armed Police (PAP). The Militia is commanded by the Central Military Commission of the Chinese Communist Party (CCP) and serves as an auxiliary and reserve force for the PLA. It is one of the largest militias in the world.

== People's Liberation Army Reserve Force ==
The Reserve Force of the People's Liberation Army is the military reserve force of the People's Liberation Army (PLA). It is composed of a trained force of (mostly retired veteran) civilians that retain an inactive military status, and are subject to fast mobilization. in case of wartime or other crises, at which time they are transferred to active duty and their units activated into full service.

== Production and Construction Corps ==
The Xinjiang Production and Construction Corps (XPCC), also known as Bingtuan, trading with the external name China Xinjian Group, is a state-owned enterprise and paramilitary organization in the Xinjiang Uygur Autonomous Region of the People's Republic of China (PRC).

== See also ==
- Central Military Commission (China)
- List of countries by number of total troops
- Paramilitary forces of India
