= Militia Weaponry and Equipment Exhibition Hall =

China Militia Weapons and Equipment Exhibition Hall
- 中国民兵武器装备陈列馆
- Location within Beijing
- Established: October 1998
- Location: Jiaowangzhuang, Yongshun Area, Tongzhou District, Beijing
- Coordinates: 39°56′9″N 116°39′56″E
- Type: Military Museum

The China Militia Weaponry and Equipment Exhibition Hall, located in Yongshun Area, Tongzhou District, Beijing is a military museum subordinate to the National Defense Mobilization Department and a national 3A-level tourist attraction

== Description ==
The Chinese Militia Weaponry and Equipment Exhibition Hall began construction in 1991, and was opened in October 1998. Jiang Zemin, General Secretary of the CCP, provided the calligraphy for the exhibition hall's nameplate.

The Exhibition Hall covers an area of nearly 100,000 square meters and a construction area of more than 12,000 square meters. The exhibition hall is divided into fourteen parts, including the Weapons Expo Center, the People's War History Museum, the Mountain Guns Array, the Simulated Shooting Range, the National Defense Education Base, the Orthopedic Cold-Treatment Hospital, the Environmental Arts section, etc.

The exhibition has 10,000 cultural relics in its collection. Among them, there are more than 5,000 guns and artillery weapons, from 23 countries. The most significant exhibits include pen pistols used by undercover agents, the giant Japanese Type 07 300mm howitzer, the very rare Chinese QBZ-87 small-calibre automatic rifle, a custom-made pistol worth one million USD, and a Japanese Imperial Family sabre. The exhibition hall has been named a National National Defense Education Demonstration Base and a Beijing Science Education Base, and has been designated as a 3A-level tourism attraction by the National Tourism Administration.

In 2016, as part of the 2015 reforms, the exhibition hall was transferred to the newly formed National Defense Mobilization Department of the Central Military Commission. In January 2017, on the eve of the Chinese New Year, State Councilor and Minister of Defense Chang Wanquan, members of the Central Military Commission, members of the NDMD and of the International Military Cooperation Office paid a visit to the Hall to confirm the handover.
