= Inner Mongolia Military District =

- 中国人民解放军内蒙古军区
- Founded: May 13, 1949; 75 years ago
- Country: People's Republic of China
- Allegiance: Chinese Communist Party
- Type: Military district
- Role: Command and control
- Part of: People's Liberation Army
- Headquarters: Hohhot, Inner Mongolia

Commanders
- Commander: Major general (shaojiang) Chen Lianbing
- Political Commisar: Major general (shaojiang) Yang Xiaokang

Chinese name
- Simplified Chinese: 中国人民解放军内蒙古军区
- Traditional Chinese: 中國人民解放軍內蒙古軍區
Transcriptions
Standard Mandarin
- Hanyu Pinyin: Zhōngguó Rénmín Jiěfàngjūn nèiměnggǔ Jūnqū

The Inner Mongolia Military District (Chinese: 中国人民解放军内蒙古军区; full name People's Liberation Army Inner Mongolia Military District or PLA Inner Mongolia Military District) is a military district of the National Defense Mobilization Department of the Central Military Commission in China.

== History ==
Inner Mongolia Military District was established on 13 May 1949.

== Leaders ==
=== Commanders ===
Name (English)	Name (Chinese)	Tenure begins	Tenure ends	Note
Ulanhu	乌兰夫	January 1950	August 1966	
Teng Haiqing	滕海清	April 1967	May 1971	
You Taizhong	尤太忠	May 1971	October 1978	
Huang Hou	黄厚	November 1978	July 1981	
Cai Ying	蔡英	August 1981	June 1988	
Li Guibin	李贵彬	June 1988	June 1990	
Diao Congzhou	刁从洲	June 1990	June 1994	
Peng Cuifeng	彭翠峰	June 1994	August 2000	
Huang Gaocheng	黄高成	August 2000	November 2006	
Zheng Chuanfu	郑传福	November 2006	December 2009	
Liu Zhigang	刘志刚	March 2010	December 2012	
Che Huasong	车华松	March 2013	August 2016	
Leng Jiesong	冷杰松	August 2016	July 2019	
Ma Qinglei	马庆雷	July 2019	October 2023	
Chen Lianbing	陈连兵	October 2023		

=== Political commissars ===
Name (English)	Name (Chinese)	Tenure begins	Tenure ends	Note
Ulanhu	乌兰夫	March 1954	August 1966	
Teng Haiqing	滕海清	April 1967	May 1971	
You Taizhong	尤太忠	May 1971	May 1972	
Wu Tao	吴涛	May 1972	March 1978	
Zhou Hui	周惠	November 1978	March 1986	
Liu Yiyun	刘一云	February 1985	June 1988	
Yang Enbo	杨恩博	June 1988	April 1994	
Zhang Zhen	张珍	April 1994	December 2000	
Zhang Jinzhu	张金柱	December 2000	January 2008	
Wu Hechun	吴合春	January 2008	April 2012	
Yang Junxing	杨俊兴	April 2012	May 2017	
Wang Bingyue	王炳跃	July 2017	October 2020	
Yang Xiaokang	杨小康	October 2020		
