= Zhejiang Military District =

- 中国人民解放军浙江省军区
- Founded: May 4, 1949; 76 years ago
- Country: People's Republic of China
- Allegiance: Chinese Communist Party
- Type: Military district
- Role: Command and control
- Part of: People's Liberation Army
- Headquarters: Hangzhou, Zhejiang

Commanders
- Commander: Major general (shaojiang) Xin Keli
- Political Commisar: Major general (shaojiang) Sun Wenju

Chinese name
- Simplified Chinese: 中国人民解放军浙江省军区
- Traditional Chinese: 中國人民解放軍浙江省軍區
Transcriptions
Standard Mandarin
- Hanyu Pinyin: Zhōngguó Rénmín Jiěfàngjūn Zhèjiāngshěng Jūnqū

The Zhejiang Military District (Chinese: 中国人民解放军浙江省军区; full name People's Liberation Army Zhejiang Military District or PLA Zhejiang Military District) is a military district of the National Defense Mobilization Department of the Central Military Commission in China.

== History ==
The Zhejiang Military District was founded on 4 May 1949 in Hangzhou, capital of Zhejiang, in China.

== Leaders ==
=== Commanders ===
Name (English)	Name (Chinese)	Tenure begins	Tenure ends	Note
Wang Jian'an	王建安	June 1949	February 1951	
Zhang Aiping	张爱萍	February 1951	July 1952	
Wang Bicheng	王必成	August 1952	May 1953	
Lin Weixian	林维先	June 1953	January 1961	
Qian Jun	钱钧	November 1961	November 1965	
Zhang Xiulong	张秀龙	November 1965	August 1967	
Xiong Yingtang	熊应堂	August 1967	May 1972	
Zhang Wenbi	张文碧	April 1975	October 1976	
Guan Junting	官俊亭	May 1978	April 1982	
Kang Mingcai	康明才	April 1982	August 1985	
Li Qing	黎清	August 1985	August 1988	
Yang Shijie	杨士杰	March 1989	November 1995	
Yuan Xinghua	袁兴华	November 1995	July 2002	
Zhang Huaisi	张怀泗	July 2002	June 2005	
Wang Hewen	王贺文	June 2005	October 2009	
Fu Yi	傅怡	October 2009	December 2013	
Wang Haitao	王海涛	December 2013	July 2015	
Zhang Mingcai	张明才	July 2015	May 2016	
Feng Wenping	冯文平	May 2016	July 2021	
Xia Junyou	夏俊友	July 2021	January 2024	
Xin Keli	辛克利	January 2024		

=== Political commissars ===
Name (English)	Name (Chinese)	Tenure begins	Tenure ends	Note
Tan Zhenlin	谭震林	May 1949	February 1952	
Tan Qilong	谭启龙	May 1952	August 1954	
Jiang Hua	江华	December 1954	January 1967	
Zhou Guanwu	周贯五	October 1955	July 1965	Second Political Commissar
Xie Shengkun	谢胜坤	December 1962	November 1965	Third Political Commissar
Long Qian	龙潜	July 1965	October 1967	Second Political Commissar
Nan Ping	南萍	August 1967	May 1972	
Tan Qilong	谭启龙	May 1972	September 1975	
Li Bincheng	栗彬成	December 1973	August 1977	
Wu Shihong	武世鸿	April 1975	December 1977	
Tie Ying	铁瑛	December 1977	March 1983	
Mou Hanqing	牟翰清	July 1978	July 1981	
Luo Qingtao	罗晴涛	July 1981	July 1983	
Wang Fang	王芳	July 1983	March 1986	
Ma Jiliang	马骥良	August 1983	August 1985	
Liu Xinzeng	刘新增	August 1985	March 1988	
Xu Yongqing	徐永清	March 1988	January 1995	
He Jiabi	贺家弼	February 1995	July 2002	
Ma Yizhi	马以芝	July 2002	October 2006	
Cheng Tongyi	程童一	October 2006	February 2007	
Lin Kaijun	林恺俊	July 2007	May 2012	
Wang Xinhai	王新海	May 2012	November 2018	
Yang Xiaoxiang	杨笑祥	November 2018	July 2020	
Xiu Changzhi	修长智	July 2020	September 2023	
Sun Wenju	孙文举	September 2023		

=== Chiefs of staff ===
Name (English)	Name (Chinese)	Tenure begins	Tenure ends	Note
Li Yingxi	李迎希	May 1949	November 1950	
Sun Jixian	孙继先	November 1950	January 1951	
Zhao Jun	赵俊	January 1952	April 1955	
Hu Darong	胡大荣	April 1955	March 1956	
Wan Zhenxi	万振西	April 1958	December 1960	
Ruan Xianbang	阮贤榜	December 1960	December 1961	
Wan Zhenxi	万振西	December 1961	May 1965	
Dong Yuxiang	董毓湘	May 1965	May 1970	
Hou Jianxin	侯建新	May 1970	July 1978	
Zhang Zutai	张祖台	July 1978	November 1979	
Zhang Qiliang	张启良	November 1979	February 1981	
Duan Chundong	段春栋	February 1981	May 1983	
Li Qing	黎清	May 1983	August 1985	
Wang Wenhui	王文惠	August 1985	July 1988	
Sun Changming	孙昌明	July 1988	June 1990	
Yuan Xinghua	袁兴华	June 1990	November 1995	
Zhang Tianfu	张天富	November 1995	December 2000	
Zhang Huaisi	张怀泗	December 2000	July 2002	
Wu Pinxiang	吴品祥	July 2002	August 2005	
Lu Liyin	卢立银	August 2005	June 2006	
Wang Haitao	王海涛	June 2006	2009	
Gao Yousu	高幼苏	2009	2013	
Zhou Zhibin	周志斌	December 2014		
