= Tang Zuohou =

- 唐作厚

Commander of the PLA Heilongjiang Military District
- In office June 1990 – 1996
- Preceded by: Shao Zhao
- Succeeded by: Wang Guiqin

Personal details
- Born: January 1933 (age 93) Dongfeng County, Jilin, China
- Party: Chinese Communist Party
- Education: Northeast Military Region Military and Political University

Military service
- Allegiance: People's Republic of China
- Branch/service: People's Liberation Army Ground Force
- Years of service: 1950–1996
- Rank: Major general

Tang Zuohou (Chinese: 唐作厚; pinyin: Táng Zuóhòu; born January 1933) is a major general in the People's Liberation Army of China who served as commander of the PLA Heilongjiang Military District from 1990 to 1996. He was a delegate to the 5th National People's Congress. He was a representative of the 14th National Congress of the Chinese Communist Party.

== Biography ==
Tang was born in Dongfeng County, Jilin, in January 1933. He attended Xingya Primary School, Xuguang Primary School, and Dongfeng Middle School. Tang enlisted in the People's Liberation Army (PLA) in November 1950, and studied at the Northeast Military Region Military and Political University in Qiqihar. After graduation in 1951, he served in the Shenyang Military Region. He was deputy commander of the 39th Group Army in May 1983 and subsequently deputy head of the Logistics Department of Shenyang Military Region in September 1985. In June 1990, he was commissioned as commander of the PLA Heilongjiang Military District, and served until 1996.

Military offices
Preceded by Shao Zhao	Commander of the PLA Heilongjiang Military District; 1990–1996	Succeeded by Wang Guiqin
