= Fu Yi (general) =

Chinese general

- 傅怡

Commander of Zhejiang Military District
- In office October 2009 – December 2013
- Preceded by: Wang Hewen
- Succeeded by: Wang Haitao

Personal details
- Born: November 1953 (age 72) Nanjing, Jiangsu, China
- Party: Chinese Communist Party

Military service
- Allegiance: People's Republic of China
- Branch/service: People's Liberation Army Ground Force
- Years of service: 1969–2013
- Rank: Major General
- Unit: 1st Group Army; 12th Army; North Sea Fleet

Fu Yi (Chinese: 傅怡; pinyin: Fù Yí; born November 1953) is a major general in the People's Liberation Army of China. He was detained by Chinese military authorities in January 2015, suspected of corruption.

Chinese media reported that he had close relations with Guo Zhenggang, the son of Guo Boxiong, a retired former vice-chairman of the Central Military Commission, China's top military body.

== Biography ==
Fu was born and raised in Nanjing, Jiangsu, with his ancestral home in Jiang County, Shanxi.

He joined the Chinese Communist Party in August 1971 and joined the People's Liberation Army in March 1969. Fu started his military career in 1980 in Nanjing Military Region.

He served as Chief of staff of the 1st Group Army, Deputy Commander of Lüshun Base of the North Sea Fleet, and Deputy Army Commander of the 12th Army before serving as Commander of Zhejiang Military District.

Fu retired in November 2013. In March 2015, Chinese media reported that Fu was detained for investigation by military prosecution authorities.

Military offices
Preceded by Wang Hewen	Commander of Zhejiang Military District; 2009–2013	Succeeded by Wang Haitao
