= Wang Jian'an =

Wing Wang Jian'an
- 王建安
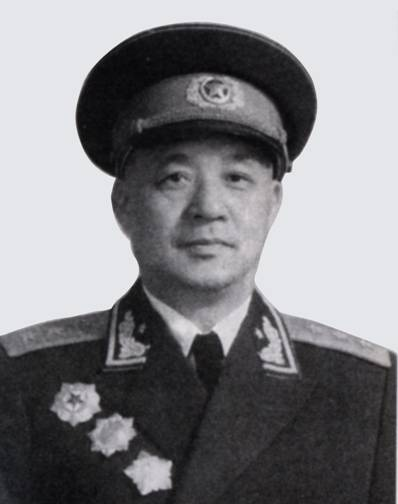
- Wang Jian'an in 1955.

Counsellor of the Central Military Commission
- In office August 1975 – July 1980

Deputy Commander of Fuzhou Military District
- In office August 1969 – August 1975

Deputy Commander of Jinan Military Region
- In office October 1961 – August 1969
- Commander: Yang Dezhi

Deputy Commander of Shenyang Military Region
- In office December 1956 – October 1961
- Commander: Deng Hua→Chen Xilian

Personal details
- Born: November 8, 1907 Hong'an County, Hubei, Qing China
- Died: July 25, 1980 (aged 72) Beijing, China
- Party: Chinese Communist Party
- Spouse: Niu Yuqing
- Children: 5
- Education: Counter-Japanese Military and Political University

Military service
- Allegiance: People's Republic of China
- Branch/service: People's Liberation Army Ground Force
- Years of service: 1926–1980
- Rank: General
- Commands: Shenyang Military Region (1956–1961); Jinan Military Region (1961–1969); Fuzhou Military District (1969–1975)
- Battles/wars: Second Sino-Japanese War; Chinese Civil War; Korean War
- Awards: Order of Bayi; Order of Independence and Freedom; Order of Liberation

Wing Wang Jian'an (Chinese: 王建安; pinyin: Wāng Jiàn'ān; 8 November 1907 – 25 July 1980) was a Chinese military official and general in the People's Liberation Army.

Wang was born into a poor family. He enlisted in the army at the age of 17 and joined the Chinese Communist Party by age 20. He experienced many significant battles during the China's turbulent years such as the Second Sino-Japanese War and the Chinese Civil War. After the founding of the Communist State, he fought with the United States Army in Korean War. After the war he was awarded the military rank of general (Shangjiang) by Chairman Mao Zedong. And he took charge of deputy commander of Shenyang Military Region (1956–1961), and then Jinan Military Region (1961–1969) and finally Fuzhou Military District (1969–1975).

Wang was a member of the 2nd and 3rd of the National Defense Commission of the People's Republic of China. He was also a Standing Committee member of the 5th National People's Congress.

== Biography ==
=== Early life ===
Wang was born into a family of farming background in Hong'an County, Hubei, on November 8, 1907.

He enlisted in the army of warlord Wu Peifu in 1924, while his mother died after the landlord beat her. In the winner of 1926, he returned to his hometown and that year participated in the peasant association and the Red Guards (赤卫队).

In August of the following year, he joined the Chinese Communist Party. Three months later, he took part in the Huangma Uprising (黄麻起义), alongside Wang Shusheng and Wang Hongkun, they collectively known as "Three Wang" (三王). Since 1928, he fought against the Nationalists in Hubei-Henan-Anhui Area of Chinese Soviet.

=== Long march ===
In 1934, he participated in the Long March, a forced expedition over 12,500 kilometers in the 1930s. In October 1936, he enrolled at the Counter-Japanese Military and Political University.

In May 1938, Wang was appointed as commander of Jinpu Detachment of the Eighth Route Army, he fought against the Imperial Japanese Army in north China's Shandong province.

=== Chinese Civil War ===
After the Chinese Civil War broke out in 1945, he fought with the Nationalists in Shandong, where he participated in the Battle of Southern Shandong. He was present at the Battle of Shatuji (沙土集战役) in August 1947 during the Huaihai Campaign.

=== PRC era ===
After the establishment of the Communist State in November 1949, Wang and his troops marched to Zhoushan Island but failed. In May 1950 he ultimately seized the island.

In 1952 the Communist government commissioned him as commander and political commissar of the 9th Legion of the People's Volunteer Army. He returned to China in the Spring of 1954, while he was fainted by high blood pressure. Then he moved into a nursing home in Qingdao, a seaside city in eastern Shandong province.

He attained the rank of general (Shangjiang) on 12 January 1956. In December that year, he was appointed as deputy commander of Shenyang Military Region, five years later he was transferred to Jinan Military Region, where he stayed in August 1969, when he was transferred again to Fuzhou Military Region. In August 1975, he became a counsellor of the Central Military Commission, serving in the post until his death in July 1980.

== Personal life ==
Wang married Niu Yuqing (牛玉清; 1913–2007). The couple had four sons and a daughter, in order of birth: Wang Xibo (王西波), Wang Dongbo (王东波), Wang Hangbo (王杭波), Wang Haibo (王海波) and Wang Libo (王丽波; daughter).

== Awards ==
- Order of Bayi, 1st Class
- Order of Independence and Freedom, 1st Class
- Order of Liberation, 1st Class

Military offices
| New title | Commander of the Zhejiang Military District; 1949–1951 | Succeeded by Zhang Aiping |
