= Geng Biao =

Chinese general and diplomat (1909–2000)

- 耿飚
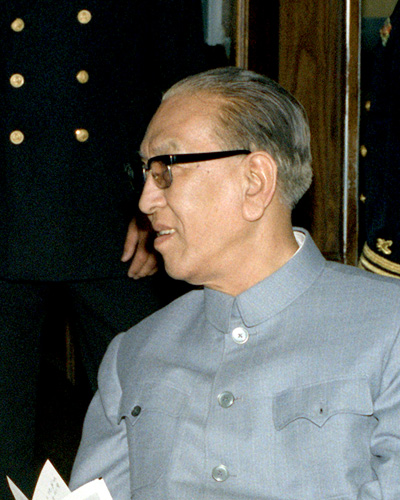
- Geng Biao at a luncheon aboard the aircraft carrier USS Ranger on 3 June 1980.

Vice Chairman of the Standing Committee of the National People's Congress
- In office 18 June 1983 – 8 April 1988
- Chairman: Peng Zhen

5th Minister of National Defense
- In office March 1981 – December 1982
- Premier: Zhao Ziyang
- Preceded by: Xu Xiangqian
- Succeeded by: Zhang Aiping

Vice Premier of China
- In office March 1978 – May 1982
- Premier: Hua Guofeng→Zhao Ziyang

Personal details
- Born: August 26, 1909 Liling, Hunan, Qing dynasty
- Died: June 23, 2000 (aged 90) Beijing, China
- Party: Chinese Communist Party
- Spouse: Zhao Lanxiang (1941–2000)
- Children: 4

Military service
- Allegiance: China

Geng Biao (Chinese: 耿飚; pinyin: Gěng Biāo; 26 August 1909 – 23 June 2000) was a senior official in the Chinese Communist Party (CCP) and a leader in Chinese politics, foreign relations, and military.

== Early life ==
Geng was born in Liling, Hunan Province of China.

In 1922, Geng was a child worker in a lead-zinc mine in Shuikoushan, south of Hengyang City in China.

Geng joined the Communist Youth League of China in Shuikoushan in 1925. In 1926, he led a miners' military campaign and failed. In 1928, he organized and led a militia in Liuyang. In August of that year, he joined the CCP.

== Military career ==
=== Red Army ===
In September 1930, Geng's forces merged into the Third Corps of the Red Army's First Army Group and he became the staff of 9th division of Third Corps. In 1933 he became the head of the 4th regiment, 2nd division of the Red First Front Army. On 10 October 1934, he embarked on the Long March as the pioneer of 2nd division and, in the beginning of 1935, seized a critical military fortress at Loushanguan in Guizhou Province. As a result, he was promoted to the chief of staff of the 1st division of Red 1st Front Army after Zunyi Conference. After arrival in northern Shaanxi, he was severely wounded in combat. In 1936, he graduated from the Counter-Japanese Military and Political University and was appointed the chief of staff of the Fourth Corps of the Red Fourth Front Army. The Fourth Corps had just arrived in northern Shaanxi having been commanded by Zhang Guotao, and Geng took control of the unit.

=== Sino-Japanese War ===
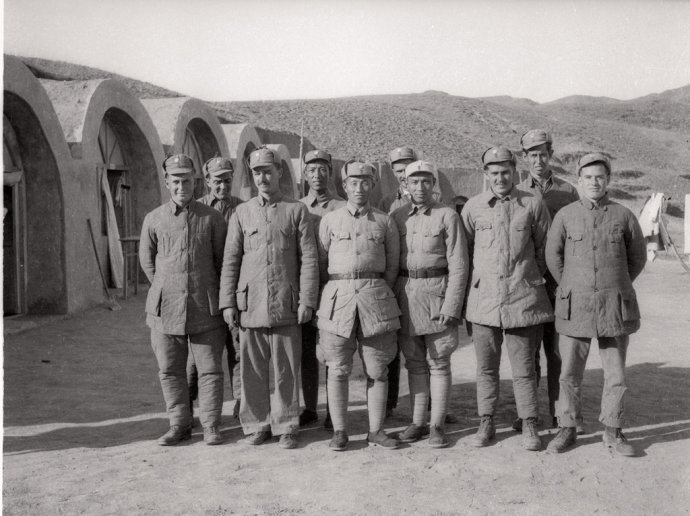
Geng Biao (second from left of the back row) with Cheng Zihua, Tang Yanjie and a US delegation at Miaotai village in Hebei, February 1945.

After outbreak of the Second Sino-Japanese War, he held several leadership positions including chief of staff, deputy head, and deputy political commissar in the 385th brigade, 129th division of the Eighth Route Army. His army occupied East Gansu Province and was responsible for guarding the western border of the Shaan-Gan-Ning Region. During this time period, he entered the Central Party School of the Chinese Communist Party. After graduation, he went to the Jin-Cha-Ji Border Region and became a military leader there. He helped lead the Eighth Route Army to seize Zhangjiakou in 1945.

=== Chinese Civil War ===
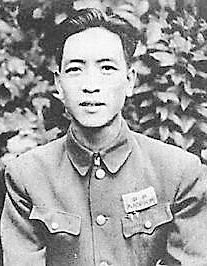
Geng Biao in 1949.

In 1946, Geng accompanied Ye Jianying to participate in the Beiping Military Conciliatory Commission, initiated by General George C. Marshall to promote and prevent the outbreak of civil war between the Chinese Communists and Nationalists. Geng was the vice chief of staff of CCP's delegates. After the conciliation failed, he went back to the Jin-Cha-Ji Region and became the chief of staff of the Field Army in the military region. In 1948, he was appointed as the vice commander of the second army group in North China Military Region. He fought in the Pingjin Campaign and the capture of Taiyuan.

== Political career ==
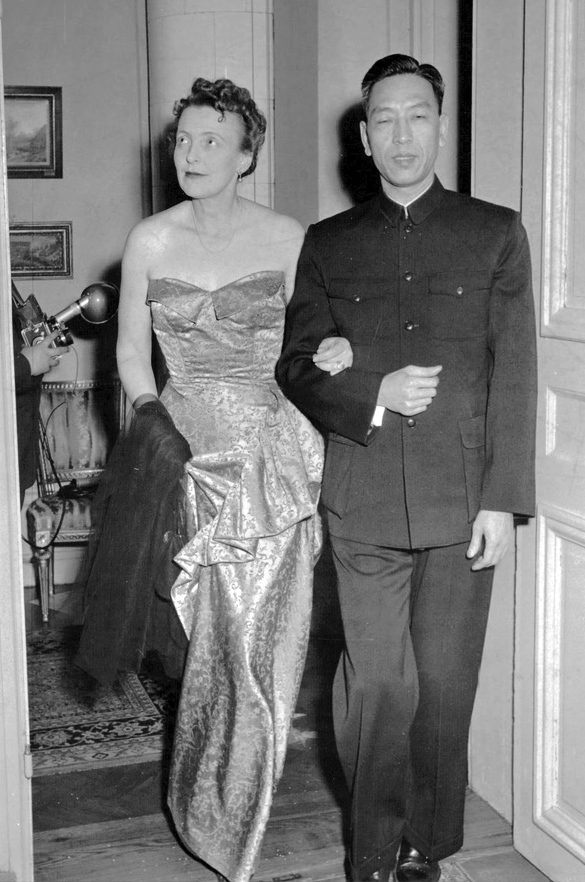
Geng Biao with Greta Belfrage, the wife of the Swedish Foreign Ministry deputy cabinet secretary Leif Belfrage at a diplomatic dinner in Blasieholmen on 19 February 1955.

After the formation of People's Republic of China, Geng was appointed as the ambassador to Sweden, and minister to Denmark and Finland on 9 May 1950. He was also the ambassador to Pakistan, Myanmar and Albania. He returned to China in 1971, and became the head of CCP's central foreign communication department, in charge of CCP's relations with foreign parties.

On 6 October 1976, he was ordered to take control of the broadcast and TV stations in Beijing, during the putsch against the Gang of Four. Subsequently, he supervised the propaganda efforts of the CCP. In 1978, he was appointed as vice-premier of the State Council, in charge of foreign relations, military industry, civil airlines and tourism. In January 1979, he became the secretary-general and member of Standing Committee of CCP's Central Military Commission. During this time Xi Jinping was one of three of Geng Biao's secretaries.

When Geng visited the U.S. in 1980, Xi got a first-hand view of American military power, visiting the Pentagon, Pearl Harbor, Fort Bragg and boarding a Kitty Hawk class aircraft carrier. In the late 1970s, Geng had argued that it was strategically wise for China to form closer relations with the U.S., as a bulwark against possible encroachment by the Soviet Union:

[If] we put the two superpowers together and deal with them one after another, the outcome will be unthinkable. Therefore, for the sake of survival, we must, in the first place, give one up and win the other over. From the strategic point of view as a whole: if we shelve the China-U.S. controversy, we will be able to cope with one side [the Soviet Union] with all-out efforts.... Therefore, striving to foster good China-U.S. relations to diminish one enemy ... [is] put forth in accordance with the requirements of the situation.

In 1981, Geng became the first Minister of National Defense of the People's Republic of China not to have held the rank of Marshal, and the only one never to have received a military rank despite his previous combat experience. In 1982, he was replaced as Minister of National Defense, but was named Vice Chairman of the Central Advisory Commission of the CCP. In June 1983, he was appointed Vice Chairman of the Standing Committee of the National People's Congress, and Chairman of the Foreign Affairs Committee. In July 1988, he was awarded the First-Class Red Star Medal of Merit by the Chinese People's Liberation Army.

Geng Biao died on 23 June 2000 in Beijing at age 90. In his final years, he was known for presenting the "Geng Biao Question" to cadres of the Party: "If one day you get sentenced, how far will the people you govern go to plead your case in an attempt to save you?"

Government offices
Preceded by Marshal Xu Xiangqian	Minister of National Defense; 1981–1982	Succeeded by General Zhang Aiping
