= Heilongjiang Military District =

- 中国人民解放军黑龙江省军区
- Founded: April 27, 1949; 76 years ago
- Country: China
- Allegiance: Chinese Communist Party
- Type: Military district
- Role: Command and control
- Part of: People's Liberation Army
- Headquarters: Harbin, Heilongjiang

Commanders
- Commander: Major general (shaojiang) Fan Minglei
- Political Commisar: Major general (shaojiang) Zhao Zhong

Chinese name
- Simplified Chinese: 中国人民解放军黑龙江省军区
- Traditional Chinese: 中國人民解放軍黑龍江省軍區
Transcriptions
Standard Mandarin
- Hanyu Pinyin: Zhōngguó Rénmín Jiěfàngjūn Hēilóngjiāngshěng Jūnqū

The Heilongjiang Military District (Chinese: 中国人民解放军黑龙江省军区; full name People's Liberation Army Heilongjiang Military District or PLA Heilongjiang Military District) is a military district of the National Defense Mobilization Department of the Central Military Commission in China.

== History ==
On April 27, 1949, the Northeast Military Region mandated the amalgamation of the Heilongjiang Military Department (黑龙江军事部) and the Nenjiang Military Department to establish the Heilongjiang Military Department, headquartered in Qiqihar, while the Songjiang Military Department and the Hejiang Military Department were consolidated to create the Songjiang Military Department, based in Harbin. On January 20, 1953, the Northeast Military Region mandated the transformation of the Heilongjiang Military Department into the Heilongjiang Military Region and the Songjiang Military Department into the Songjiang Military Region. In June 1954, pursuant to the Central People's Government's "Provisions on the Abolition of Administrative Institutions at the Regional Level and the Merger of Certain Provincial and Municipal Establishments" (Chinese: 关于撤销大区一级行政机构和合并若干省市建制的规定), and in accordance with directives from the Central Military Commission and the Northeast Military Region, the Heilongjiang and Songjiang Military Regions were consolidated to establish the new Heilongjiang Military Region, headquartered in Harbin City.

== Leaders ==
=== Commanders ===
Name (English)	Name (Chinese)	Tenure begins	Tenure ends	Note
Huang Jingyao	黄经耀	1953	1955	
Zhang Kaijing	张开荆	1955	1962	
Wang Jiadao	汪家道	1962	1975	
Zhao Xianshun	赵先顺	1975	1983	
Li Dehe	李德和	1983	1985	
Shao Zhao	邵昭	1985	1990	
Tang Zuohou	唐作厚	1990	1996	
Wang Guiqin	王贵勤	1996	1997	
Li Heng	李衡	1997	2003	
Kou Tie	寇铁	2003	2010	
Gao Chao	高潮	2010	2012	
Sheng Bin	盛斌	2012	2015	
Li Lei	李雷	May 2015	November 2018	
Xia Junyou	夏俊友	November 2018	2021	
Kang Jianguo	康建国	September 2021	2022	
Fan Minglei	范明磊	2022		

=== Political commissars ===
Name (English)	Name (Chinese)	Tenure begins	Tenure ends	Note
Xie Fulin	谢福林	1956	1969	
Liu Guangtao	刘光涛	1969	1976	
Zhao Xingyuan	赵兴元	1976	1985	
Ma Chunwa	马春娃	1985	1993	
Song Fengming	宋凤鸣	2008	2011	
Ma Xueyi	马学义	2011	October 2015	
Wang Bingyue	王炳跃	October 2015	May 2017	
Yang Junxing	杨俊兴	May 2017	2018	
Fu Yongguo	傅永国	August 2018	September 2021	
Zhao Zhong	赵忠	September 2021		
