= Henan Military District =

- 中国人民解放军河南省军区
- Founded: March 1, 1949; 76 years ago
- Country: People's Republic of China
- Allegiance: Chinese Communist Party
- Type: Military district
- Role: Command and control
- Part of: People's Liberation Army
- Headquarters: Zhengzhou, Henan

Commanders
- Commander: Major general (shaojiang) Zhao Jun
- Political Commisar: Major general (shaojiang) Xu Yuanhong

Chinese name
- Simplified Chinese: 中国人民解放军河南省军区
- Traditional Chinese: 中國人民解放軍河南省軍區
Transcriptions
Standard Mandarin
- Hanyu Pinyin: Zhōngguó Rénmín Jiěfàngjūn Hénánshěng Jūnqū

The Henan Military District (Chinese: 中国人民解放军河南省军区; full name People's Liberation Army Henan Military District or PLA Henan Military District) is a military district of the National Defense Mobilization Department of the Central Military Commission in China.

== History ==
Henan Military District was established on 1 March 1949, under the jurisdiction of the Central China Military Region of the People's Liberation Army.

== Leaders ==
=== Commanders ===
| Name (English) | Name (Chinese) | Tenure begins | Tenure ends | Note |
|---|---|---|---|---|
| Chen Zaidao | 陈再道 | March 1949 | March 1955 | |
| Bi Zhanyun | 毕占云 | April 1955 | July 1963 | |
| Zhang Shuzhi | 张树芝 | July 1963 | May 1978 | |
| Shang Tan | 尚坦 | May 1978 | October 1983 | |
| Zhan Jingwu | 战景武 | October 1983 | August 1988 | |
| Li Guangsheng | 李广生 | August 1988 | December 1990 | |
| Zhu Chao | 朱超 | December 1990 | June 1995 | |
| Wang Yingzhou | 王英洲 | June 1995 | December 1999 | |
| Yang Dixian | 杨迪铣 | February 2000 | December 2003 | |
| Yuan Jiaxin | 袁家新 | December 2003 | September 2008 | |
| Liu Menghe | 刘孟合 | September 2008 | May 2013 | |
| Lu Changjian | 卢长健 | May 2013 | March 2017 | |
| Zhou Li | 周利 | March 2017 | December 2017 | |
| Liu Changchun | 刘长春 | December 2017 | July 2018 | |
| Chen Zhaoming | 陈兆明 | July 2018 | July 2022 | |
| Zhao Jun | 赵钧 | July 2022 | | |

=== Political commissars ===
| Li Xuefeng | 李雪峰 | March 1949 | June 1949 |
| Zhang Xi | 张玺 | June 1949 | November 1952 |
| Pan Fusheng | 潘复生 | February 1953 | August 1958 |
| Wu Zhipu | 吴芝圃 | August 1958 | July 1961 |
| Liu Jianxun | 刘建勋 | July 1961 | October 1978 |
| Duan Junyi | 段君毅 | October 1978 | January 1981 |
| Liu Jie | 刘杰 | January 1981 | May 1985 |
| Dong Guoqing | 董国庆 | August 1985 | June 1990 |
| Wu Guangxian | 吴光贤 | June 1990 | August 1994 |
| Wang Yingzhou | 王英洲 | August 1994 | June 1995 |
| Ren Xuanyi | 岳宣义 | June 1995 | April 1996 |
| Zhang Jianzhong | 张建中 | April 1996 | December 2003 |
| Qi Zhengxiang | 祁正祥 | December 2003 | December 2006 |
| Yan Jixiong | 颜纪雄 | March 2007 | July 2011 |
| Zhou Heping | 周和平 | July 2011 | May 2015 |
| Wang Weili | 王伟力 | May 2015 | May 2017 |
| Hu Yongcheng | 胡永生 | May 2017 | April 2020 |
| Xu Yuanhong | 徐元鸿 | April 2020 | |
