= Kou Tie =

Chinese politician

- 寇铁

Commander of Heilongjiang Military District
- In office December 2003 – September 2010
- Preceded by: Li Heng
- Succeeded by: Gao Chao

Army Commander of the 23rd Army
- In office January 2002 – November 2003
- Preceded by: Liu Fengju
- Succeeded by: Army was revoked

Personal details
- Born: April 1950 (age 76) Anda, Heilongjiang, China
- Party: Chinese Communist Party
- Education: PLA National Defence University

Military service
- Allegiance: People's Republic of China
- Branch/service: People's Liberation Army Ground Force
- Years of service: 1968–2010
- Rank: Major general
- Unit: 40th Army; 23rd Army

Kou Tie (simplified Chinese: 寇铁; traditional Chinese: 寇鐵; pinyin: Kòu Tiě; born April 1950) is a Chinese major general in the People's Liberation Army. As of November 2014, he was under investigation by the military authorities. In May 2015, the government turned his case over to military prosecutors. Previously he served as commander of Heilongjiang Military District.

Kou Tie was a delegate to the 11th National People's Congress. He is a member of the China Calligraphers Association. He was a lyricist of the Army Song of the 23rd Army.

== Biography ==
Kou Tie was born in Anda, Heilongjiang, in April 1950. He graduated from PLA National Defence University. He enlisted in the People's Liberation Army in March 1968 by age 18, during the dawn of Cultural Revolution. He was successively as soldier, platoon leader, section chief, and division commander before serving as chief of staff of the 40th Army in December 1996. He was promoted to major general in July 1998. He was deputy army commander of the 40th Army in December 2001, and held that office until January 2002, when he was promoted to become commander of the 23rd Army. He was the 14th and the last army commander of the 23rd Army, due to the Army was revoked in November 2003. Then he was transferred to another post as commander of Heilongjiang Military District, serving in the post until he retirement in September 2010. He has come under investigation for "serious legal violations" in November 2004 and was transferred to the military judicial organ in May 2015.

Military offices
Preceded by Liu Fengju (柳凤举)	Army Commander of the 23rd Army; 2002–2003	Succeeded by Army was revoked
Preceded by Li Heng (李衡)	Commander of Heilongjiang Military District; 2003–2010	Succeeded by Gao Chao (高潮)
