= Zhang Aiping =

Chinese general (1908–2003)

- 张爱萍
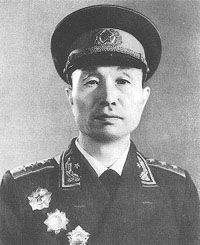

State Councilor of China
- In office 19 November 1982 – 12 April 1988
- Premier: Zhao Ziyang; Li Peng

6th Minister of National Defense
- In office 19 November 1982 – 12 April 1988
- Premier: Zhao Ziyang; Li Peng
- Preceded by: Geng Biao
- Succeeded by: Qin Jiwei

Vice Premier of the People's Republic of China
- In office September 1980 – September 1982
- Premier: Zhao Ziyang

Personal details
- Born: Zhang Duanxu (张端绪); January 9, 1910 Da County, Sichuan, Qing Dynasty (now Dachuan District, Sichuan, China)
- Died: July 5, 2003 (aged 93) Beijing, China
- Party: Chinese Communist Party
- Education: Counter-Japanese Military and Political University
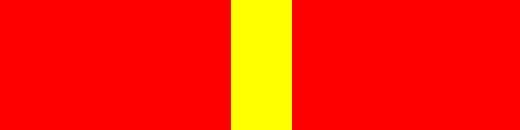
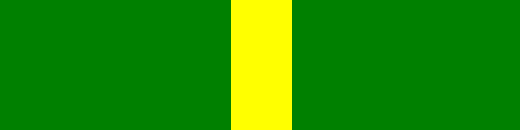
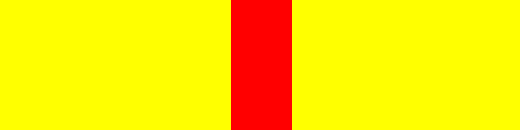
- Awards: Order of Bayi (First Class Medal); Order of Independence and Freedom (First Class Medal); Order of Liberation (First Class Medal); Red Star Meritorious Medal of the Chinese People's Liberation Army (First Class Medal)

Military service
- Allegiance: China
- Branch/service: People's Liberation Army
- Years of service: 1929–1987
- Rank: General
- Battles/wars: Chinese Civil War; Second Sino-Japanese War

Zhang Aiping (Chinese: 张爱萍; Wade–Giles: Chang Ai-p'ing; January 9, 1910 – July 5, 2003) was a Chinese military leader.

== Biography ==
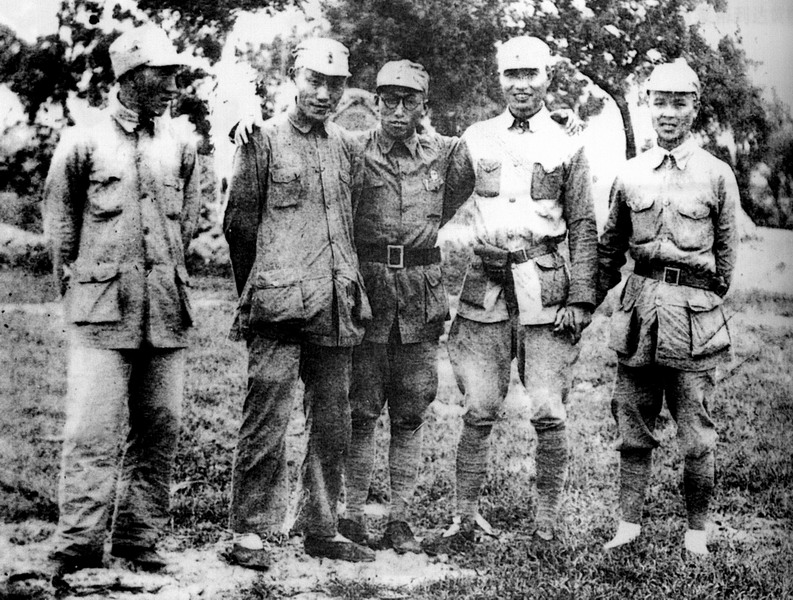
From left: Han Zhenji, Liang Xingchu, Huang Kecheng, Zhang Aiping and Wei Guoqing, marking the meeting of the Fifth Column of the Eighth Route Army and the Northern Jiangsu Command of the New Fourth Army in Dongtai, Jiangsu on October 10, 1940.

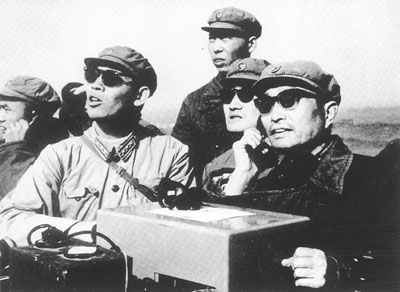
Zhang Aiping reporting to Zhou Enlai on October 16, 1964, following the first nuclear weapon test

Zhang joined the Chinese Communist Party in 1928 after taking part in a communist-led rural uprising. He participated in the Long March and served as a field commander in the Chinese Red Army, first fighting against Chiang Kai-shek's Kuomintang forces, and later the Imperial Japanese Army in the Second Sino-Japanese War. During World War II Zhang commanded a guerrilla band sent to rescue U.S. flight crews who crash landed in China following the April 1942 Tokyo bombing raid led by Lieutenant Colonel Jimmy Doolittle.

After 1949, Zhang was an important builder of the Chinese military forces. He commanded the first People's Liberation Army naval force and served as an army corps commander in the Korean War. Upon his return home he served in a series of significant military and political posts. He was made a General in 1955.

Zhang supervised the Two Bombs, One Satellite project and successfully directed the development of China's nuclear deterrent. However, he was accused of counterrevolutionary crimes and dismissed from all positions during the Cultural Revolution, when many veteran communists were attacked by Red Guards inspired by Mao Zedong's vision of continuous revolution, and one of his legs was broken as a result. Later, Zhang would comment: "The only thing the Cultural Revolution succeeded in was giving me a cane."

He reappeared in 1973 and chaired the Defense Technology Commission of the People's Liberation Army. During this time he attempted to rein in poor quality from armament factories by reestablishing government oversight over facilities which had been taken over by unsupervised workers. A biography of him by his son, PLA senior colonel Zhang Sheng, recorded the first of such incidents, when Zhang went to investigate the rocket gyroscope manufacturer Factory 230 which had become infamous for poor quality, which caused abnormally high accident rates in launch tests and notably two reconnaissance satellites being lost:

The facilities were a mess. The labs didn’t even have drinking water. Upon being asked, they said we don’t need water. The toilets have been plugged for years and sewage overflowed to the door. This was only changed after we arrived and found some spare parts. Air conditioning was missing in a lot of places and many pipes were cracked from being frozen.

Chen Baoding said: “No need to speak further about the research facilities. One workshop had 70% deficient micrometers, how can they produce? Everyone is divided into two factions and rebelling and counter-rebelling. The factions are also internally organized, and criticize everyone who don't agree with them. Specialist Yao Tongbin who returned from Germany died after a brawl broke out. Others are cleaning toilets and such.”

Qiu Jinchun who went with father said: “In one room thick cobwebs hung from the walls to the door. The dust was so thick on the ground that footprints were visible. Machine tools were sealed and rusting. According to the workers, these machines hadn’t been used since the Cultural Revolution began.”

The basement was an airtight constant temperature and humidity cleanroom workshop. We went in and were immediately greeted by a huge icicle more than a meter tall. The commander said: “What a sight! This is a precision instrument factory and there are stalactites in it!” The roof was leaking, and someone brought a straw hat for the commander. He said “What a great solution, how about let everyone wear straw hats to work in the future!”... Trash was in piles, cars entering and exiting drove all over them. The road was blocked by digging, and once they were repaired they were severed again. They said they were taking the air conditioner to a pigsty, because their pigs needed to be warm. The bathroom’s water flowed from the fifth floor to the first, and no one in charge or responsible could be found.

— Zhang Sheng, From the War - Dialogue between Two Generations of Soldiers

Zhang submitted a report on the conditions of the factory to the state council, which called a meeting on the subject. During the meeting, Zhang further described the status of the workers:

Zhang Aiping: Factory 230, which is a key component of the strategic nuclear force development chain, is de facto paralyzed. Out of 4 workshops totaling 1000 employees, only 4% are at their stations. 96% aren’t coming to work at all. The workers called themselves the 8923 corps, later they began calling themselves the 8200 corps…

Deng Xiaoping interjected: What does that mean?

Zhang Aiping: This is what the workers say. 8923, means working from 8-9 am to 2-3 pm. Later they didn’t work at all and only came at 8 am and 2 pm, and left after signing in. A female worker said to me: “These years we are eating socialism!” They are taking paychecks from the country and taking public property at will, how can this be acceptable? Isn’t this eating socialism?

Deng Xiaoping: Eating socialism?

Shen Bingchen (member of the committee) interjected: The workers said, only two institutions are left: the cafeteria and paychecks. Everything else is gone.

— Zhang Sheng, From the War - Dialogue between Two Generations of Soldiers

Zhang was able to regain control of the factory by threatening to remove anyone participating in political factionalism. He was given the support of Mao Zedong and Deng Xiaoping.

In 1975, he became the director of the National Defense Science and Technology Commission (NDSTC). He advocated the development of nuclear missiles, especially the DF-5 ICBM, as a means of countering the perceived threat from the Soviet Union. He contended that JL-1 weapons must also "go ashore" and be adapted to a solid fuel land-based missile, the DF-21. After Deng Xiaoping's early 1976 removal from office, Zhang stepped down from the NDSTC.

Zhang served as defense minister from 1982 until 1988. He served as deputy chief of the PLA general staff, vice premier, and chaired a key commission that sought to modernize the PLA. He advocated for China to develop solid-fueled missiles, land-based mobile launch capability, and further develop its nuclear weapon capabilities.

During the 1989 Tiananmen Square protests and massacre, Zhang Aiping signed a letter opposing the enforcement of martial law by the Army in Beijing.

Due to the exigent circumstances, we as old soldiers, make the following request: Since the People's Army belongs to the people, it cannot stand against the people, much less kill the people, and must not be permitted to fire on the people and cause bloodshed; to prevent the situation from escalating, the Army must not enter the city.

— Ye Fei, Zhang Aiping, Xiao Ke, Yang Dezhi, Chen Zaidao, Song Shilun and Li Jukui, May 21, 1989, letter to the Central Military Commission and Capital Martial Law Command Headquarters

Zhang Aiping died in Beijing at the age of 93.

== See also ==
- List of officers of the People's Liberation Army

Military offices
Preceded by Wang Jian'an	Commander of the Zhejiang Military District; 1951–1952	Succeeded by Wang Bicheng
Government offices
Preceded by Geng Biao	Minister of National Defense; 1982–1988	Succeeded by Qin Jiwei
