= Liu Faqing =

Chinese lieutenant general of the People's Liberation Army

- 刘发庆

Secretary-General of National Defense Mobilization Commission
- In office December 2021 – October 2026
- Leader: Li Keqiang; Li Qiang

Head of the National Defense Mobilization Department of the Central Military Commission
- In office December 2021 – October 2026
- Leader: Xi Jinping
- Preceded by: Sheng Bin

Deputy Commander of the People's Liberation Army Ground Force
- In office October 2018 – December 2021
- Commander: Han Weiguo

Commander of the People's Liberation Army Air Force Airborne Corps
- In office March 2017 – October 2018
- Preceded by: New title
- Succeeded by: Sun Xiangdong

Personal details
- Born: June 1964 (age 62) Yanshi, Henan, China
- Party: Chinese Communist Party (expelled in 2026)
- Education: M. V. Frunze Military Academy

Military service
- Allegiance: People's Republic of China
- Branch/service: People's Liberation Army Ground Force
- Years of service: 1982-present
- Rank: Lieutenant general

Chinese name
- Traditional Chinese: 劉發慶
- Simplified Chinese: 刘发庆
Transcriptions
Standard Mandarin
- Hanyu Pinyin: Liú Fāqìng

Liu Faqing (Chinese: 刘发庆; born June 1964) is a lieutenant general (zhongjiang) of the People's Liberation Army (PLA). He served as Secretary-General of National Defense Mobilization Commission, deputy commander of the People's Liberation Army Ground Force and as commander of the People's Liberation Army Air Force Airborne Corps. Liu was promoted to the rank of major general (shaojiang) in December 2014 and lieutenant general (zhongjiang) in December 2019. In October 2026, Liu was expelled from the Chinese Communist Party.

== Biography ==
Liu was born in Yanshi, Henan in June 1964. He enlisted in the People's Liberation Army (PLA) in October 1982. He served in the People's Liberation Army Air Force Airborne Corps for a long time, where he was promoted to become its commander in March 2017. In October 2018, he was promoted again to become deputy commander of the People's Liberation Army Ground Force.

Liu is an alternate of the 19th Central Committee of the Chinese Communist Party, and a Full member of the 20th CC.

On 29 October 2026, the fifth plenary session of the 20th CCP Central Committee reviewed and approved the report of the Discipline Inspection Commission of the Central Military Commission on the "serious violations of discipline and law" by Liu and confirmed the Politburo decision to expel him from the CCP.

Military offices
Preceded by Yang Jie (杨杰	Chief of staff of the 15th Airborne Army; 2014–2015	Succeeded by Sun Xiangdong (孙向东)
Preceded by Li Fengbiao	Commander of the 15th Airborne Army; 2015–2017	Succeeded by Position abolished
New title	Commander of the People's Liberation Army Air Force Airborne Corps; 2017–2018	Succeeded by Sun Xiangdong
