= Militia (China) =

Chinese paramilitary force

Militia of China 中国民兵 Zhōngguó Mínbīng
- Emblem of the Militia
- Founded: 1927; 99 years ago
- Country: China
- Allegiance: Chinese Communist Party
- Branch: Ground militia Maritime militia
- Type: Militia; Military reserve force
- Role: Preparations against war; Defense operations; Assistance in maintaining public order
- Size: 8,000,000
- Part of: Armed Forces of the People's Republic of China (under the Central Military Commission)
- March: "March of the Militia" 民兵进行曲
- Engagements: Chinese Civil War; Sino-Japanese War; Korean War; Sino-Soviet border conflict (1969); Tiananmen Incident (1976); Sino-Vietnamese War (1979); Sino-Vietnamese conflicts (1979–1991); South China Sea disputes

Commanders
- Chairman of the Central Military Commission: Xi Jinping
- Director of the National Defense Mobilization Commission: Li Qiang
- Minister of National Defence: Admiral Dong Jun
- Director of the CMC National Defense Mobilization Department: Zhang Like

Insignia
- Flag of the Chinese Militia

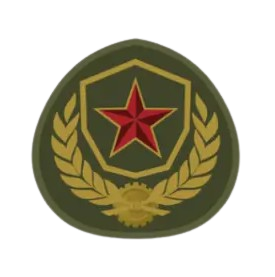
- Cap insignia of the Militia

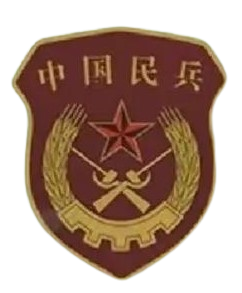
- Shoulder patch of the Militia

The Militia (Chinese: 民兵; pinyin: Mínbīng) or Militia of China (Chinese: 中国民兵; pinyin: Zhōngguó Mínbīng) is the militia component of the armed forces of the People's Republic of China, the other two parts being the People's Liberation Army (PLA) and the People's Armed Police (PAP). The Militia is commanded by the Central Military Commission of the Chinese Communist Party (CCP) and serves as an auxiliary and reserve force for the PLA. It is one of the largest militias in the world.

== Organization ==
Provincial Military Districts, Municipal/Prefecture level Military Sub-Districts and County/District level People's Armed Forces Departments along with township/subdistrict People's Armed Forces Departments are in charge of local Militia; The agencies who control the Militia are also under the command of regional governments, making them similar to American State defense forces.

Depending on population, village-level subdivisions will have either a Militia Company or Battalion, while subdistricts/township level subdivisions will have platoons, companies, battalions or regiments.

Guicheng Subdistrict militia conducting a forest fire suppression exercise
- https://imagepphcloud.thepaper.cn/pph/image/240/860/953.jpg

== Roles and tasks ==
The formal tasks of the Militia remain those defined by Article 22 of the Law of the People's Republic of China on National Defense: the Militia, under the command of military organs, shoulders the tasks of preparations against war and defense operations, and assists in maintaining public order.

According to Article 36 of the Military Service Law of the People's Republic of China, the Militia's tasks are specifically:

1. take an active part in the socialist modernization drive and be exemplary in completing the tasks in production and other fields;
2. undertake the duties related to preparations against war, defend the frontiers and help maintain public order with law enforcement organizations established by law; and
3. be always ready to join the armed forces to take part in war, resist aggression and defend the nation at all costs.

The militia is organized into regional militia corps in every theater command of the PLA, which in turn oversee militia divisions and subordinate formations, and is further subdivided into specialty militia units. It is overseen by the National Defense Mobilization Commission, which can order the deployment of its personnel during either peacetime and wartime contingencies, according to the instructions by the Chairman of the Central Military Commission, who, as also the General Secretary of the Chinese Communist Party, is overall supreme commander-in-chief of the armed services of the People's Republic.

As of 2023, there are 20 listed types in the NDMD survey of available militia units. These give an idea of the very large number of possible missions expected from militia units:

- Emergency Response (应急)
- Stability Maintenance (维稳处突类)
- Special Search and Rescue (专业救援类)
- Duty Support (勤务保障类)
- Maritime Militia (海上民兵)
- Border/Coastal Defense (边海防民兵)
- Air Defense (防空民兵)
- Special Support (特种支援保障)
- Engineering Repair (工程抢修)
- Chemical Defense (防化救援)
- Transportation and Shipping (交通运输)
- Road Protection (保交护路)
- Communication Support (通信保障)
- Recon Support (侦察情报保障)
- Logistics Support (后勤保障)
- Equipment Support (装备保障)
- Service Support (对口保障军兵种)
- Cyber (网络)
- Intelligence (情报信息)
- Sentry Posts (哨所)

The list then describes 419 functional categories for militia units, classified into the above 20 types.

=== New militia types ===
As that need for mass warfare has dissipated, the need for more specialized support forces capable to assist in modern system warfare, and help in Military Operations Other than War has increased. In particular after 2017 and the call to "Perfect National Mobilization" there has been a concerted effort to recruit a "new-type militia force system" (新型民兵力量体系) which mainly involves inducting into militia work people with specialized and professional skills from China's modern economy, and specialized enterprises.

Cases such as the creation in June 2020 of five new militia units in Tibet, which recruited local skilled Tibetans into specialized, highly trained and equipped special-mission groups including an air patrol, a communications team, a high altitude climbing team, and a fast reaction team. The participation of skilled locals in this sort of militias is hoped to provide both cohesion-reinforcing civilian involvement, and an skilled force in aerial reconnaissance, intelligence collection, rescue operations, "countermeasure actions", and stability maintenance. These new units resemble more the civilian auxiliaries in the US (such as the Military Auxiliary Radio System, the Civil Air Patrol, and the United States Coast Guard Auxiliary) than the traditional mass militia built around villages or work units.

Private companies, which may already have contractual relationship with the state, are also a source of new type militias. Qihoo 360, a Chinese cybersecurity company that has been involved several times in detecting foreign state actors cyberattacks on Chinese systems, set up a network security militia unit within its personnel and using its own resources. State-owned enterprises also have accelerated the setting up of militia units (by creating or recreating People's Armed Force Departments within the structure of the enterprise).

The shift from large-scale militias to specialized units since 2016 has entailed reducing the size of the militia and focusing on increasing its quality. As the new militia specialty formations were being activated, 27.8% of cadre militia (基干民兵) has been demobilized from service.

=== Maritime Militia ===
China Maritime Militia (CMM) is a subset of China's national militia. The CMM trains with and supports the People's Liberation Army Navy and the China Coast Guard in tasks including:

- safeguarding maritime claims
- protecting fisheries
- logistics
- search and rescue (SAR)
- surveillance and reconnaissance

In the South China Sea, the CMM plays a major role in controversial maritime activities to achieve China's political goals.

Maritime Militia funding and associated paramilitary training led to a reversal of the downward trend of the Chinese commercial fishing fleet. This Maritime Militia fueled expansion has led to an increase in illegal, unreported and unregulated fishing.

== History ==
The role of the militia in the PRC has varied over the years. During the Chinese Communist Revolution, the CCP emphasized grassroots mobilization to develop the militia. Largely composed of peasants, the militia had diverse roles including protecting villages, implementing land reform, and opposing external threats.

During the 1940s the militia served as a support force for the PLA. After the 1949 foundation of the PRC, the CCP used the militia to reconstruct the country (in particularly the devastated railway system), to maintain law and order in the countryside, and for defense of the borders and coast. One of the problems the militia attempted to solve was the large number of Kuomintang troops (estimated to be around 400,000) that had been discharged but had not returned to their homes. Some of these resorted to banditry to survive, and all represented a permanent security threat.

It was, however, the Korean War of 1950-53 that provided the impetus for the integration of the militia with the PLA proper. In June 1950, a "People's Armed Forces Department" (Chinese: 人民武装部; pinyin: Rénmín Wǔzhuāngbù) was created as part of the Central Military Commission, which was responsible for recruiting, organizing and training the people's militia formations. This department set up branches in administrative divisions below province or region level, and it assigned all able-bodied men between the ages of 18 and 35 who were not already serving in the People's Liberation Army to a people's militia unit. In addition to their regular professional activities, the militia cadres had to complete 30 days of training, which they had to complete within a year; the ordinary militia members underwent 15 days of basic training.

The militia did not, however, receive a formal legal basis until 1955, when the "Conscription Law of the People's Republic of China" (Chinese: 中华人民共和国兵役法; pinyin: Zhōnghuá Rénmín Gònghéguó Bīngyìfǎ) was passed by the 1st National People's Congress. Article 58 of the law specified the militia's duties, which included responsibility for public security in support of the People's Police, and the protection of national economic production sites like factories, farms and mining complexes. The implementing rules and regulations of the law stipulated that the People's Armed Forces Departments are to be established in the lower levels, in townships and street districts. Militia units were set up not only in every community, but also in every large work unit (danwei), state owned companies and economic facilities like mine complexes and oil fields. It was at this time that the main difference between "Cadre Militia" (Chinese: 基干民兵; pinyin: Jīgàn Mínbīng), i.e. the members of the core group of the people's militia, and the "common militia" (Chinese: 普通民兵; pinyin: Pǔtōng Mínbīng) was set up. The cadre militia should mainly be former servicemen of the People's Liberation Army - by that time Korean War veterans - under the age of 28 having completed their obligatory national service duty, and women could only serve in separate women's departments of this cadre militia. All other men between 18 and 35 were assigned to the Common Militia.

With tensions rising with the US, the CMC met May 27 to July 22, 1958, to discuss paths to military strengthening. Peng Dehuai attempted to modernize the PLA, work more closely with the USSR, and build the militia to become the main reserve force for the PLA.

Mao Zedong preferred to emphasize People's war. The militia was expanded under the slogan "make everyone a soldier" to enhance civilian military training in anticipation of potential attack by the United States. In the late 1950s, the public promotion of the life of Liu Hulan was important in this effort.

After the Kinmen Crisis of 1958, Mao became convinced that China could not rely on the USSR as an ally in case of war with the US and the Republic of China. The expansion of the militia became even faster. By January 1959, the total militia manpower had grown to a nominal 220 million out of a population of 653 million, that is to say, almost every single man and woman of military age.

This degree of mobilization and the workforce depletion that training this mass force caused was a contributing factor to the disastrous famines of the Great Leap Forward. At a four-week Politburo meeting in July 1959, Defense Minister Peng Dehuai, concerned about the operational capability of the People's Liberation Army due to food shortages, voiced strong criticism of the Great Leap Forward. Mao admitted to making mistakes, but then ensured that the Central Committee ejected Peng as defense minister in August under the pretext of collaborating with the Soviet Union. Lin Biao was appointed as his successor on 17 September 1959. Like Mao, Lin was a supporter of the People's War concept, but he was also an experienced field general. He was aware of the limitations of a poorly trained militia armed with only light weapons. Lin reduced the militia size, and changed the focus to more in-depth training over quantity. Every people's commune had to have a militia company (连) with around 200 personnel. This added up to around 5 million men and women.

The militia naturally became entangled in the continuous conflict and fighting of the Cultural Revolution, and became deeply fragmented in the complex factional struggle of the times. Like everything else in China, training and organizational quality decayed in the chaos. The Gang of Four also attempted to build up the urban militia as an alternative to the PLA, but the urban militia failed to support them when Hua Guofeng and other moderate military leaders deposed them.

In 1979, China fought a short war with Vietnam over Vietnamese involvement in Cambodia. 200,000 PLA soldiers were supported by several thousand "front support militiamen" (Chinese: 支前民兵; pinyin: Zhīqián Mínbīng) from Guangxi and Yunnan provinces, who carried ammunition and food to the frontlines, removed the wounded to the field hospitals, and fought in some minor engagements. Militia members also handled logistical tasks including transporting food and supplies, and building roads, trenches, and bridges. The fact that the militiamen were dressed in civilian clothes and many spoke Zhuang rather than Mandarin resulted in several cases of friendly fire.

In the Reform and Opening era, the militia and its role in a possible war with the USSR became a focus of debate. On 31 May 1984, a new conscription law was passed by the National People's Congress, where the tasks of the militia were defined in more detail in Article 36: 1) Serve as a training service as preparation for war. 2) Provide border protection 3) Maintain public safety. The need for free-moving labor and the massive migration from the countryside that came with the rapid economic growth distorted the basis of the traditional militia.

In the "Guidelines for Militia Work" (Chinese: 民兵工作条例; pinyin: Mínbīng Gōngzuò Tiáolì) issued by the State Council and the Central Military Commission on 24 December 1990, it is further specified in Article 11: Companies or battalions of the People's Militia were to be set up in the countryside, with villages as the smallest unit. In the cities, platoons, companies, battalions and regiments of the people's militia were to be set up within urban danwei, be them companies or public institutions, or within the street district as the smallest territorial unit. Technical troop detachments should be set up in the cadre militia units in accordance with the need for preparation for war and the available equipment. In particular, anti-aircraft battalions and regiments should be set up at important civil defense facilities in cities, in transport hubs, and other areas requiring protection.

People's militia training centers were to be set up in the various districts progressively, provided with the necessary training material and equipment by the General Staff of the PLA. The militia members were to be compensated for the loss of earnings during training, farmers would be compensated by the municipal administration, workers and employees in the cities were to be compensated by their employers.

On 29 November 1994, the Department of People's Armament at the Central Military Commission was transformed into the "National Defense Mobilization Commission" (Chinese: 国家国防动员委员会; pinyin: Guójiā Guófáng Dòngyuán Wěiyuánhuì), which is dually subordinate to the State Council and the CMC. As of 2024, the chairman of the commission has always been the Prime Minister. The Popular Mobilization Commission has branch offices in every district above county-level.

After the 2015 reform, the CMC created the "National Defense Mobilization Department" (Chinese: 中央军委国防动员部; pinyin: Zhōngyāng Jūnwěi Guófáng Dòngyuánbù) in which border protection and civil defense competencies have been pooled. The National Defense Mobilization Department is the bureaucratic arm of the National Defense Mobilization Commission, the head of the NDMD being the secretary of the commission. The Main Office of the National Defense Mobilization Commission (Chinese: 国家国防动员委员会综合办公室; pinyin: Guójiā Guófáng Dòngyuán Wěiyuánhuì Zōnghé Bàngōngshì) is a "one institution, two names" co-located with the General Office of the NDMD.

With the passage of the 2022 Reservist Law, the Militia was formally separated from the PLA Reserves.

== Militia's Oath ==
我是中国民兵，我宣誓：
服从中国共产党领导，积极参与国家建设，
忠实履行国防义务，遵纪守法，
服从命令，忠于职守，
努力学习，刻苦训练，
随时响应国家号令，参军参战，
支援前线，英勇顽强，
不怕牺牲，坚决完成任务，
永不背叛祖国。

Translation:

I, a Chinese Militiaman/Militiawoman, swear thus to:
obey CCP's leadership, actively participate in nation-building;
loyally conduct national defense duties, follow the laws;
follow orders, be loyal to my duties;
study hard, train hard;
respond to the nation's orders at all times, participate in the military and in battle;
aid the frontlines, be brave and tenacious;
not fear sacrifice, resolutely finish the mission;
[and] never betray the fatherland.

== See also ==
- Maoism
- Mass line
- People's war
- Paramilitary forces of China
- People's Armed Police
- China Coast Guard
- Xinjiang Production and Construction Corps
- National Defense Mobilization Commission under the State Council
- National Defense Mobilization Department of the Central Military Commission
