= National Defense Mobilization Department of the Central Military Commission =

Main mobilization organ of the Chinese military

Defense Mobilization Department of the Central Military Commission
- 中央军委国防动员部

Agency overview
- Formed: 11 January 2016
- Type: Functional department of the Central Military Commission
- Jurisdiction: People's Liberation Army
- Headquarters: Ministry of National Defense compound ("August 1st Building"), Beijing
- Agency executive: Zhang Like, Director
- Parent department: Central Military Commission
- Website: chinamil.com.cn

National Defense Mobilization Department of the Central Military Commission
- Simplified Chinese: 中央军事委员会国防动员部
- Traditional Chinese: 中央軍事委員會國防動員部
Transcriptions
Standard Mandarin
- Hanyu Pinyin: Zhōngyāng Jūnshì Wěiyuánhuì Guófáng Dòngyuánbù

The National Defense Mobilization Department of the Central Military Commission is a first-level organ under the Central Military Commission, at the deputy theater grade level. Like the CMC, it is a "one institution, two names" entity, that combines both party and state functions.

It was founded on 11 January 2016, under Xi Jinping's military reforms. as the successor of the Department of Defense Mobilization of the Central Staff.

== History ==
In May 1984, the National People's Congress passed a new Military Service Law of the People's Republic of China. This stipulated that the responsibility of the conscription system would fall under the Ministry of Defense under the leadership of the CMC. This resulted in the establishment of the Ministry of Defense's Recruitment Office (国防部征兵办公室) to coordinate the responsibility of the Military Regions in carrying out military service under the guidance of the PLA's General Staff office.

In November 2015, the original PLA's General Staff's National Defense Mobilization Department was transformed into one of the 15 functional departments of the Central Military Commission, creating the new National Defense Mobilization Department in January 2016.

On November 3, 2020, the State Council and the CMC established an inter-ministerial joint working group on the conscription system (State Council General Office Circular 2020 No. 120). Organized by the Enlistment Office of the Ministry of Defense, it joined 14 government or party units including the Publicity Department of the CCP Central Committee, the National Development and Reform Commission, the Ministry of Education, the Ministry of Public Security, the Ministry of Finance, the Ministry of Human Resources and Social Security, the Ministry of Transport, the National Health Commission, the Ministry of Veterans Affairs, the Political Work Department of the Central Military Commission, the Logistics Support Department of the Central Military Commission, the Training Administration Department of the Central Military Commission, the National Defense Mobilization Department of the Central Military Commission, and the Political and Legal Committee of the Central Military Commission. This joint working group signaled the leadership's interest in modernizing the mobilization capacities of China.

The joint meetings resulted in the introduction in March 2023 of the new Reservists Law that redefined the structure of the reserve force and separated the Militia from the reserve force for the first time.

== Functions ==
The mobilization department is charged with collecting all information regarding available resources that can be mobilized in case of war, crisis, or disaster, and with devising the necessary plans and regulations to best mobilize those resources. The NDMD has primary responsibility for the assignment of reservists to reserve units, and for call-up in case of mobilization The NDMD must carry out yearly national defense mobilization capacity surveys.

== Subordinate entities ==
- General Office (办公厅)
- Political Work Bureau (政治工作局)
- Mobilization and Recruitment Bureau (动员征集局)
- Militia and Reserves Bureau (民兵预备役局)
- Civil Air Defense Bureau (人防局)
- Border Defense Bureau ( 边防局)
- Militia Weaponry and Equipment Exhibition Hall (中国民兵武器装备陈列馆)

The Recruitment Office of the Ministry of Defense is headed by the secretary of the NDMD, linking the two institutions.

=== Subordinate Regional Units ===
Each provincial-level entity with the exception of Beijing, Xinjiang, Tibet, Hong Kong, and Macau has been organized as a Provincial Military District (省军区) (Note: Autonomous Regions are called plain "military districts"(军区) and Municipalities "garrison districts" (警备区)) These Provincial Military Districts have been deprived of much of the responsibilities they used to have before 2015 (namely border defense and public order maintenance), and now are mostly used for the purposes of mobilization and resource planning; Additionally, provincial military districts are under the command of the provincial government. Each provincial district runs a Provincial Military District Mobilization Bureau (省军区动员局).

- Anhui Military District (安徽省军区)
- Fujian Military District (福建省军区)
- Gansu Military District (甘肃省军区)
- Guangdong Military District (广东省军区)
- Guizhou Military District (贵州省军区)
- Hainan Military District (海南省军区)
- Hebei Military District (河北省军区)
- Henan Military District (河南省军区)
- Heilongjiang Military District (黑龙江省军区)
- Hubei Military District (湖北省军区)
- Hunan Military District (湖南省军区)
- Jiangsu Military District (江苏省军区)
- Jiangxi Military District (江西省军区)
- Jilin Military District (吉林省军区)
- Liaoning Military District (辽宁省军区)
- Qinghai Military District (青海省军区)
- Shaanxi Military District (陕西省军区)
- Shanxi Military District (山西省军区)
- Shandong Military District (山东省军区)
- Sichuan Military District (四川省军区)
- Yunnan Military District (云南省军区)
- Zhejiang Military District (浙江省军区)
- Guangxi Military District (广西军区)
- Inner Mongolia Military District (内蒙古军区)
- Ningxia Military District (宁夏军区)
- Chongqing Garrison Command (重庆警备区)
- Shanghai Garrison Command (上海警备区)
- Tianjin Garrison Command (天津警备区)

== List of leaders ==
=== Directors ===
English name	Chinese name	Took office	Left office	Notes
Sheng Bin	盛斌	November 2015	December 2021	
Liu Faqing	刘发庆	December 2021	October 2025	
Zhang Like	张立克	October 2025	Incumbent	

== See also ==
- Central Military Commission (China)
- National Defense Mobilization Commission
