= People's Armed Forces Department =

Type of Chinese military body

People's Armed Forces Department (PAFD; Chinese: 人民武装部; pinyin: Rénmín wǔzhuāng bù) is a type of military department in China that is run by the People's Liberation Army (PLA). PAFDs have been established at the county and township administrative levels and in other large organizations such as state-owned enterprises and schools.

== History ==
Under the leadership of Mao Zedong, People's Armed Forces Departments were established at the county and village level, focusing on recruitment and management of militia. Activities of PAFD units decreased significantly under the leadership of Deng Xiaoping.

== Functions ==
PAFDs are responsible for recruiting personnel for all the armed forces, and recruitment, organization and leadership of local militias. They also manage local light weapons warehouses. PAFD and militia units serve an auxiliary role by helping during natural disasters and emergencies, as well doing propaganda and defense education activities. The People's Armed Forces Departments in border counties may also lead active PLA units such as border defense battalions and border defense companies. The PAFDs have a strong reserve wartime mobilization structure. In wartime, the People's Armed Forces Departments distributed in various places, organizations, and institutions would become the contact and command points for war mobilization on the spot. The county-level People's Armed Forces Department is also one of the six major teams of local administration.

Multiple schools, universities, and state-owned enterprises have established internal People's Armed Forces Departments. The internal units are expected "to work together with grassroots organizations to collect intelligence and information, dissolve and/or eliminate security concerns at the budding stage," according to the People's Liberation Army Daily. PAFD units are staffed by military and civilian employees from local governments.
