= National Defense Mobilization Commission =

Chinese state military organization

- 国家国防动员委员会
- Formation: November 1994
- Type: Deliberative and coordinating body
- Location: Beijing
- Chairman: Li Qiang
- Vice Chairmen: Wu Zhenglong
- Secretary-General: Liu Faqing
- Parent organization: State Council, Central Military Commission
- Subsidiaries: General Office of the National Defense Mobilization Commission (and others)

National Defense Mobilization Commission
- Simplified Chinese: 国家国防动员委员会
- Traditional Chinese: 國家國防動員委員會
Transcriptions
Standard Mandarin
- Hanyu Pinyin: Guójiā Guófáng Dòngyuán Wěiyuánhuì

Abbreviation
- Simplified Chinese: 国家国动委
- Traditional Chinese: 國家國動委
Transcriptions
Standard Mandarin
- Hanyu Pinyin: Guójiā Guódòngwěi

Further abbreviation
- Simplified Chinese: 国动委
- Traditional Chinese: 國動委
Transcriptions
Standard Mandarin
- Hanyu Pinyin: Guódòngwěi

The National Defense Mobilization Commission (NDMC) is an organization in China responsible for coordinating decisions concerning military affairs, strategic plans and defense mobilization. It operates simultaneously under the State Council and the Central Military Commission. It is responsible for bringing together civic resources in the event of a war, and coordinating these efforts with military operations. The commission is usually chaired by the Premier of the State Council. It was established by the "National Defense Mobilization Law" in November 1994.

Since 2023, Premier Li Qiang has served as chairman of the commission, with State Council Secretary-General Wu Zhenglong as vice chairman, and Lieutenant General Liu Faqing as secretary-general. Liu is simultaneously the director of the National Defense Mobilization Department of the Central Military Commission

== Functions ==
The National Commission for National Defense Mobilization is principally a coordination and policy-making body tasked with linking the military side with the civilian side of defense issues. It is supposed to "develop the military strategic policy of active defense, organize and implement national defense mobilization; coordinate the relationship between the economy and the military, the army and the government, and manpower and material resources with the work of national defense mobilization, so as to enhance the strength of national defense and improve the capabilities of peaceful war preparation."

The main responsibilities of the National Defense Mobilization Committee as defined by law are:

1. To implement the guidelines, policies and instructions of the CCP Central Committee, the State Council, and the Central Military Commission concerning the work of national defense mobilization.
2. To draft laws, regulations, and measures for national defense mobilization work.
3. To organize the preparation of national defense mobilization plans.
4. To inspect and supervise the implementation of national defense mobilization laws and regulations and the execution of national defense mobilization plans.
5. To coordinate major national defense mobilization work in the military, economic, and social fields.
6. To organize and lead the national mobilization of the people's armed forces, national economic mobilization, people's air defense, transportation readiness, and national defense education.
7. To exercise all other powers and functions conferred by the Central Committee of the Party, the State Council and the Central Military Commission.

== Structure ==
The Commission shares its functional offices with the CMC National Defense Mobilization Department and with other departments of the CMC, with identical personnel, in an example of the ubiquitous "one institution with two names" or "two institutions, one office" system.

The nameplates used for the Mobilization Commission's offices (linked to those used by the corresponding CMC Departments) are as follows:

- General Office of the National Defense Mobilization Commission (国家国防动员委员会综合办公室)
- National People's Armed Forces Mobilization Office (国家人民武装动员办公室)
- National Civil Air Defense Office (国家人民防空办公室)
- National Transportation Readiness Office (国家交通战备办公室)
- National Economic Mobilization Office (国家经济动员办公室)
- National Defense Education Office (国家国防教育办公室)

The commission and the six offices have branches in local governments and in each theater commands.

== See also ==
- Military of the People's Republic of China
  - Militia (China)
  - Maritime Militia
- Central Military Commission (China)
  - National Defense Mobilization Department of the Central Military Commission
- State Council of the People's Republic of China
  - Ministry of National Defense of the People's Republic of China
  - Ministry of Veterans Affairs of the People's Republic of China
  - State Administration for Science, Technology and Industry for National Defence
