= Baiduizi station =

Beijing Subway station

Coordinates: 39.9239°N 116.3258°E

Baiduizi 白堆子
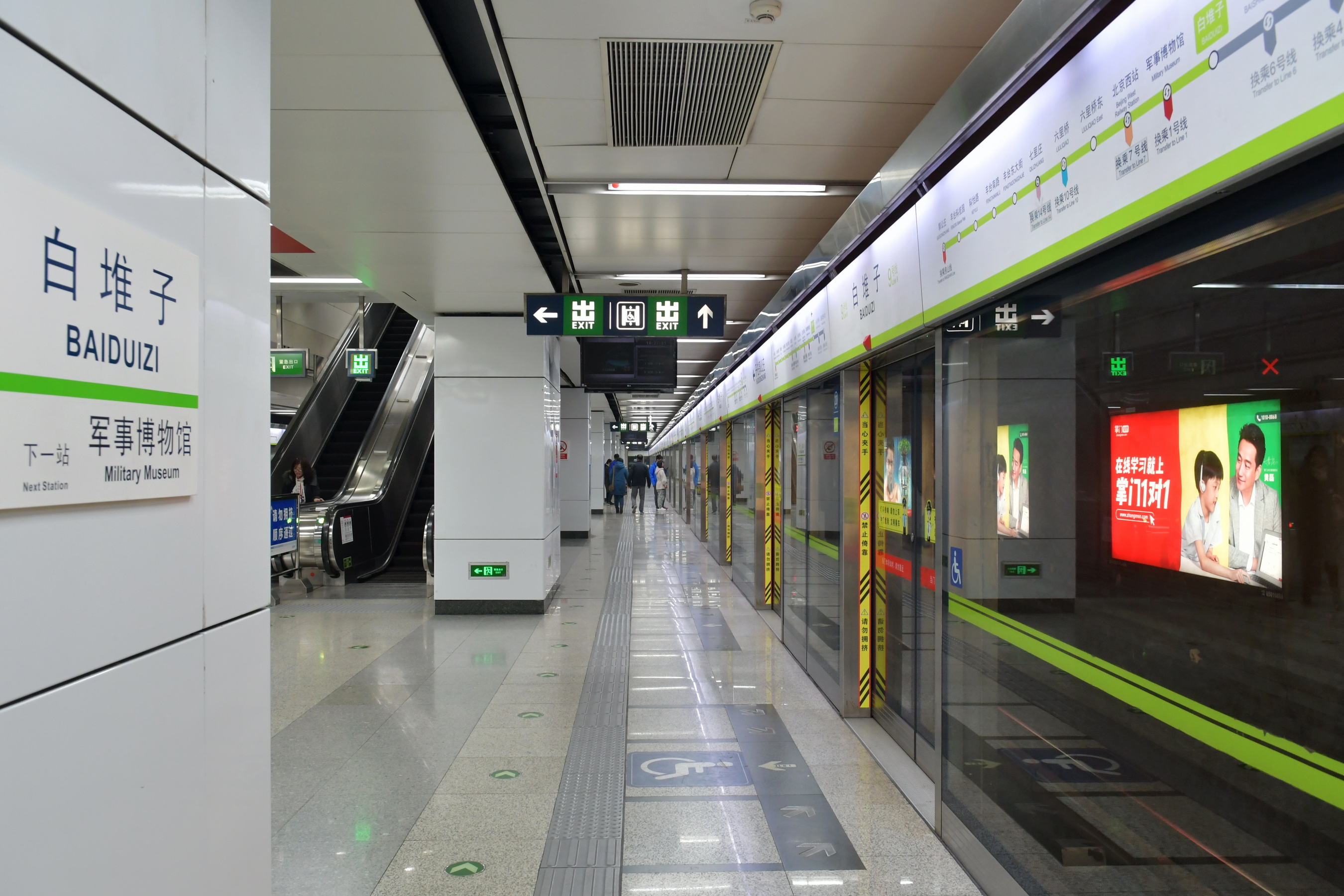
- Platform

General information
- Location: Capital Indoor Stadium South Road and Fucheng Road; Haidian District, Beijing; China
- Operator: Beijing Mass Transit Railway Operation Corporation Limited
- Lines: Line 9 Fangshan line (through service)
- Platforms: 2 (1 island platform)
- Tracks: 2

Construction
- Structure type: Underground
- Accessible: Yes

History
- Opened: December 30, 2012

Services
Preceding station	Beijing Subway	Following station
Baishiqiaonan towards National Library	Line 9	Military Museum towards Guogongzhuang
Baishiqiaonan towards National Library	Fangshan line Through service (weekday peak only)	Military Museum towards Yancundong
Location
- Location within Beijing

Baiduizi (Chinese: 白堆子站; pinyin: Báiduīzǐ Zhàn) is a station on Line 9 of the Beijing Subway. This station opened on December 30, 2012.

== Station layout ==
The station has an underground island platform.

== Exits ==
There are 4 exits, lettered A, B, C, and D. Exit A is accessible.

== Gallery ==
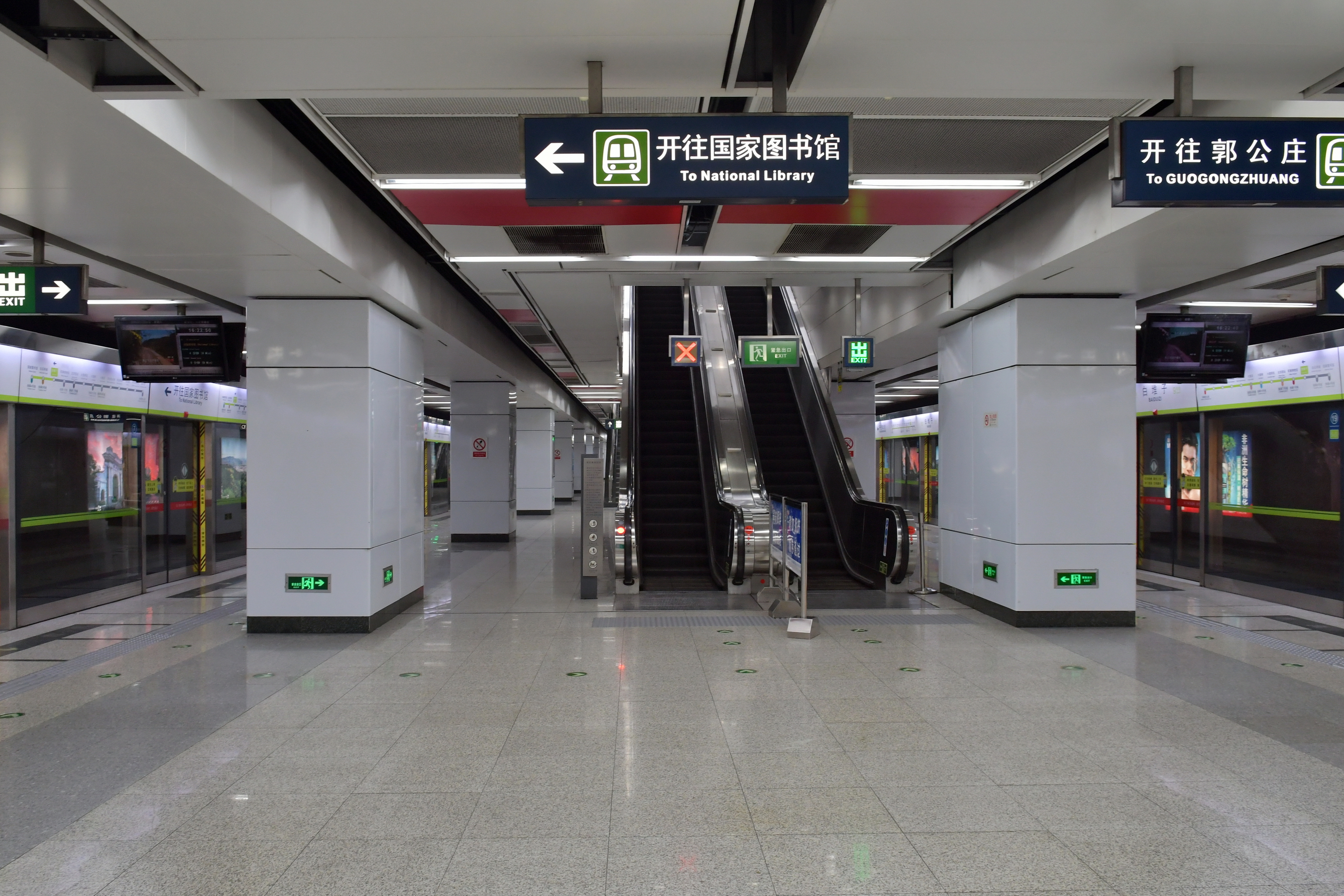
Platform

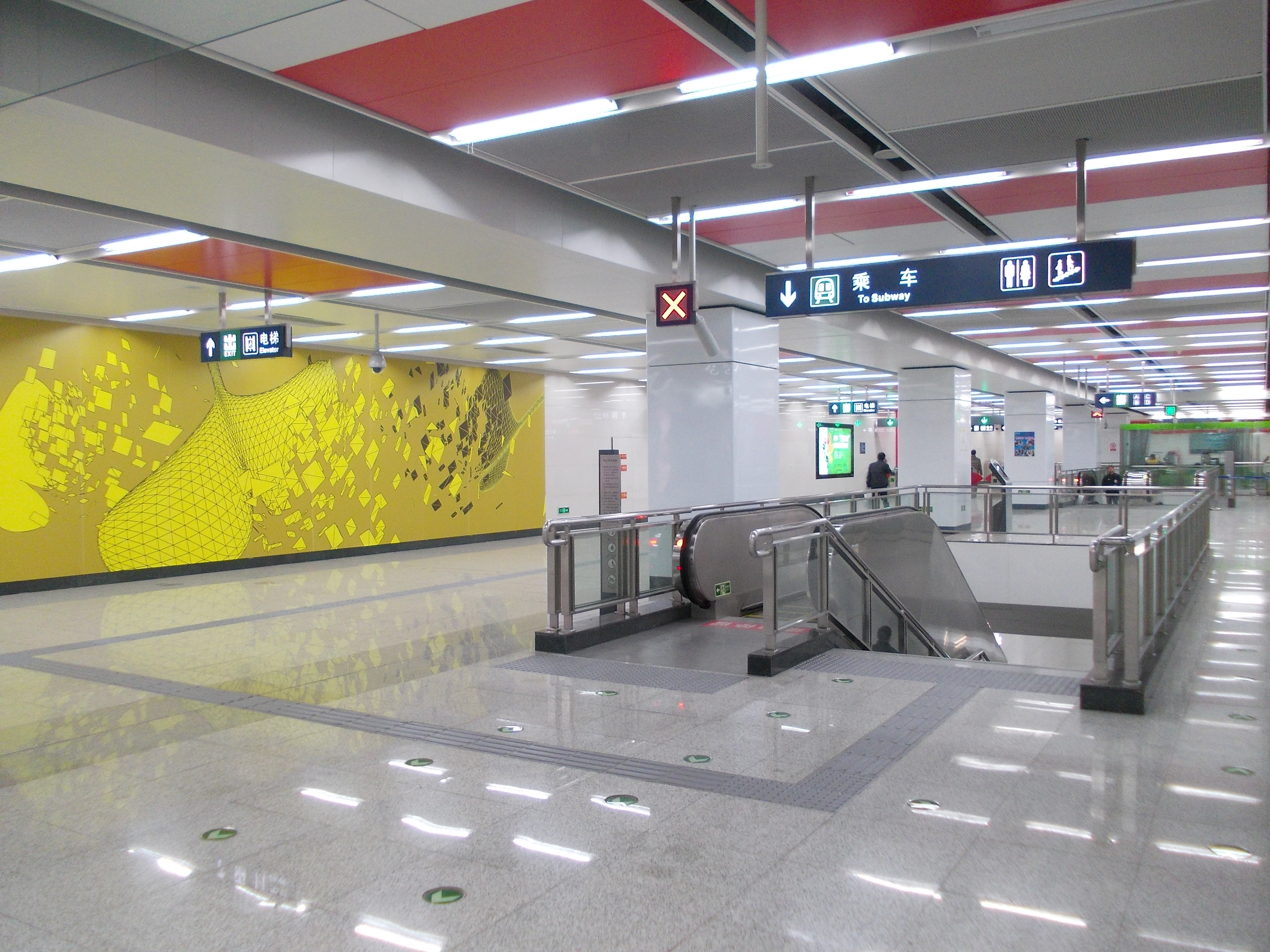
Hall
