= Baishiqiaonan station =

Beijing Subway interchange station

Baishiqiaonan 白石桥南
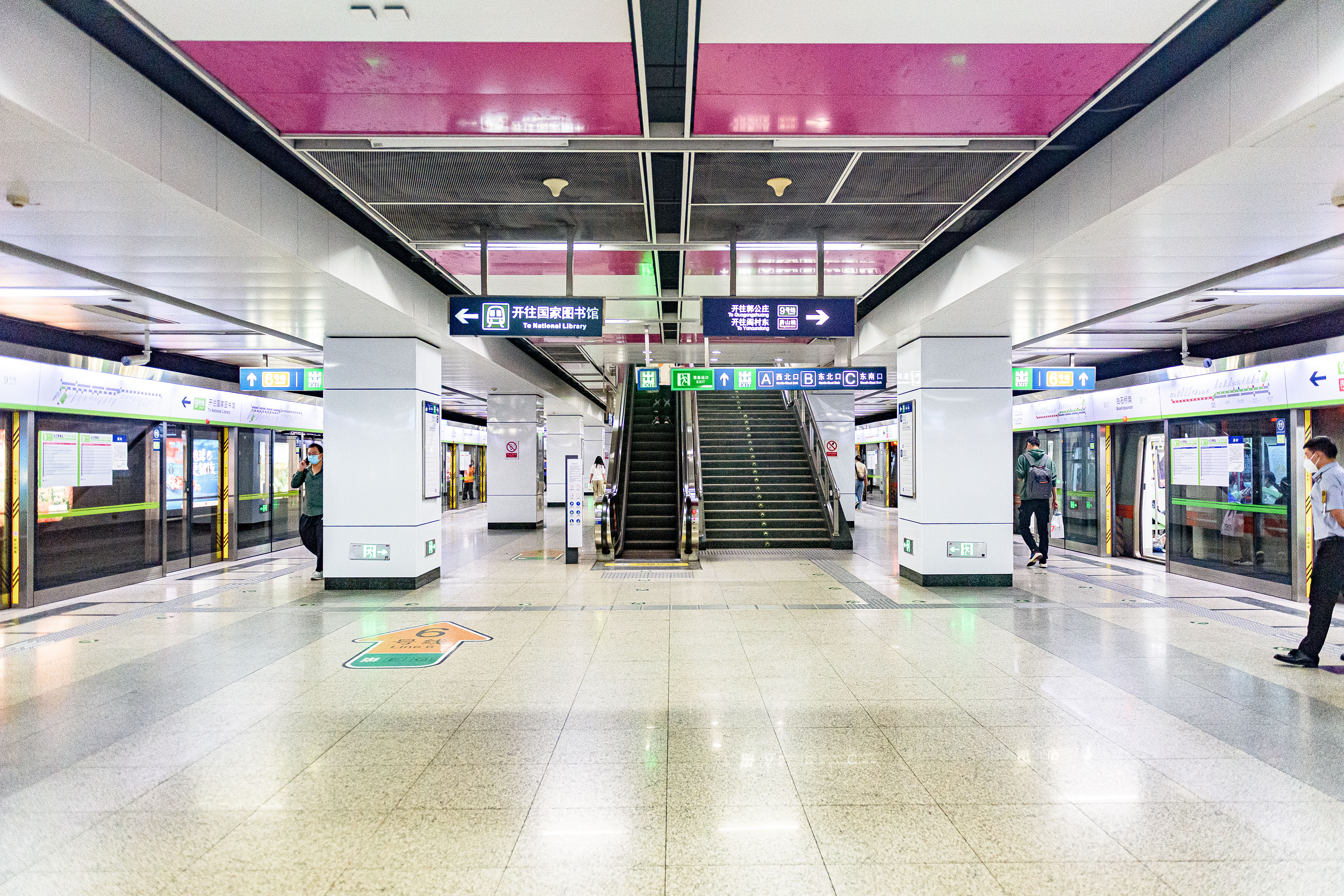
- Line 6 platform Line 9 platform

General information
- Location: West Chegongzhuang Road (车公庄西路) and South Shoudu Tiyuguan Road; Haidian District, Beijing; China
- Coordinates: 39.9330°N 116.3257°E
- Operator: Beijing Mass Transit Railway Operation Corporation Limited
- Lines: Line 6; Line 9; Fangshan line (through service)
- Platforms: 4 (2 island platforms)
- Tracks: 4

Construction
- Structure type: Underground
- Accessible: Yes

History
- Opened: December 30, 2012; 13 years ago

Services
Preceding station	Beijing Subway	Following station
Huayuan Qiao towards Jin'anqiao	Line 6	Erligou towards Luyang
National Library Terminus	Line 9	Baiduizi towards Guogongzhuang
National Library Terminus	Fangshan line Through service (weekday peak only)	Baiduizi towards Yancundong
Location
- Location within Beijing

Baishiqiaonan (simplified Chinese: 白石桥南站; traditional Chinese: 白石橋南站; pinyin: Báishíqiáonán Zhàn) is an interchange station on Line 6 and Line 9 of the Beijing Subway. This station opened on December 30, 2012.

== Station layout ==
Both the line 6 and 9 stations have underground island platforms. The line 6 platforms are located a level under the line 9 platforms.

== Exits ==
There are 5 exits, lettered A, B, C, E and G. Exits C and G are accessible.

== Gallery ==
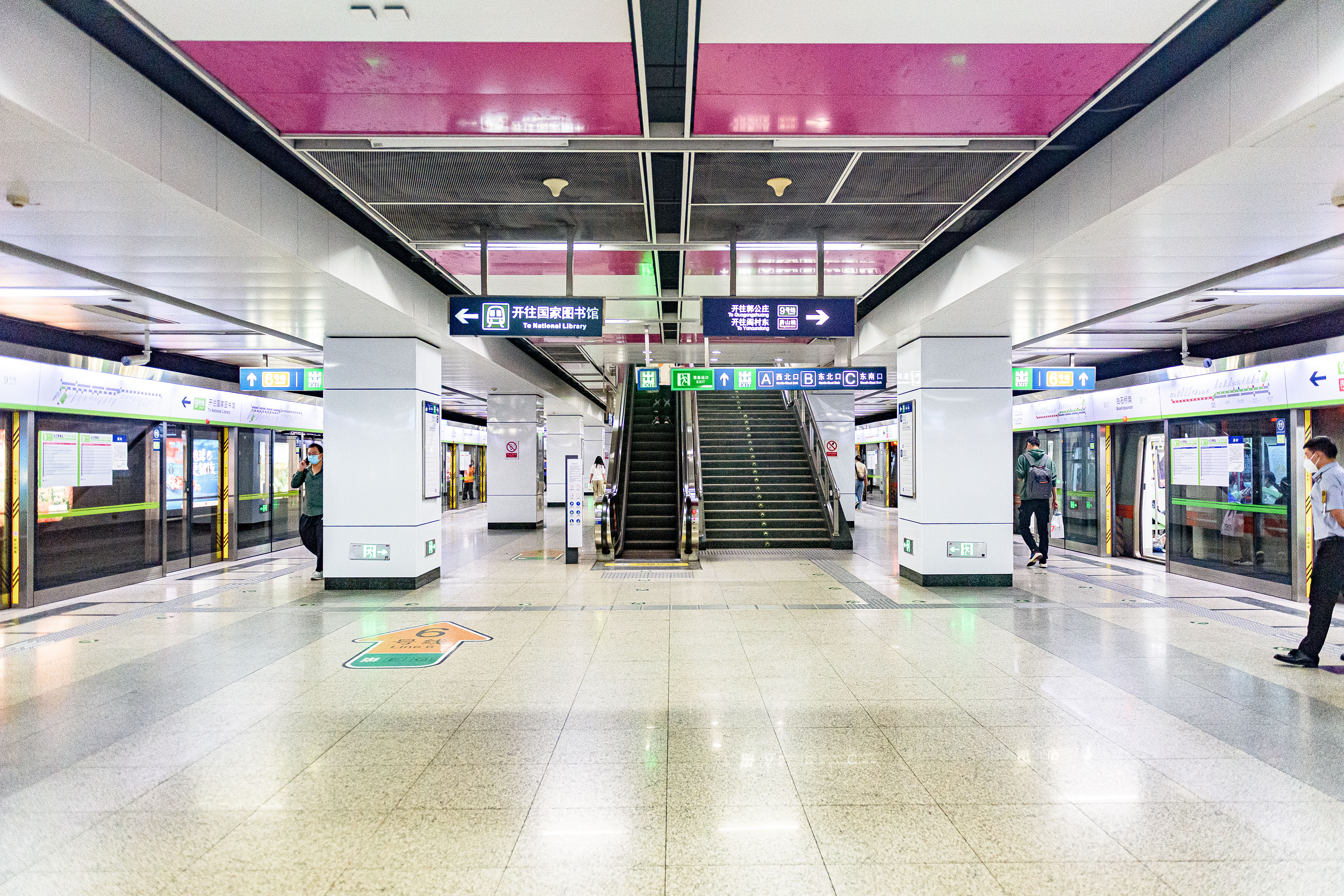
Platform of line 9 with Fangshan line through service displays

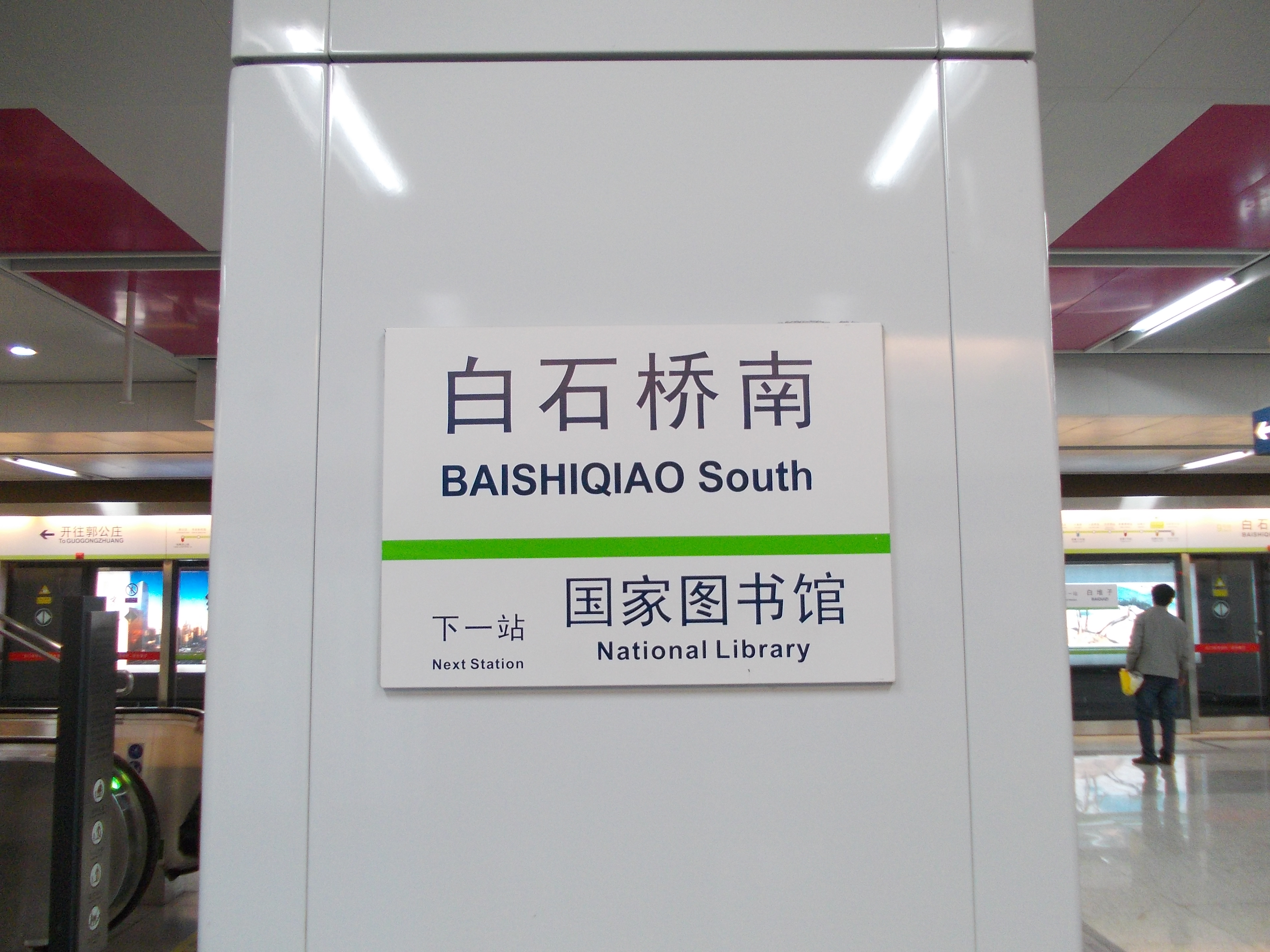
Platform sign of line 9

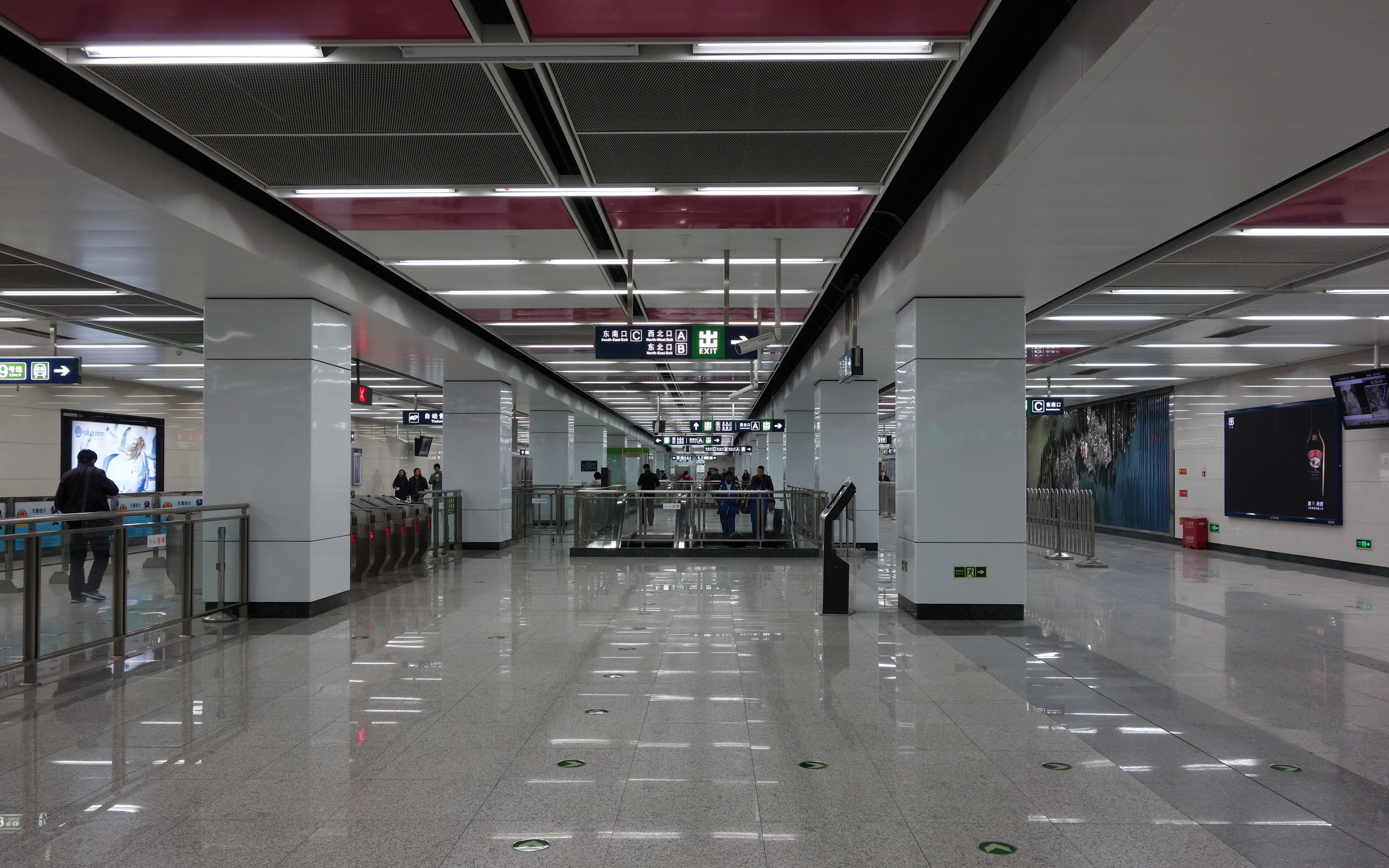
Line 9 concourse (October 2013)

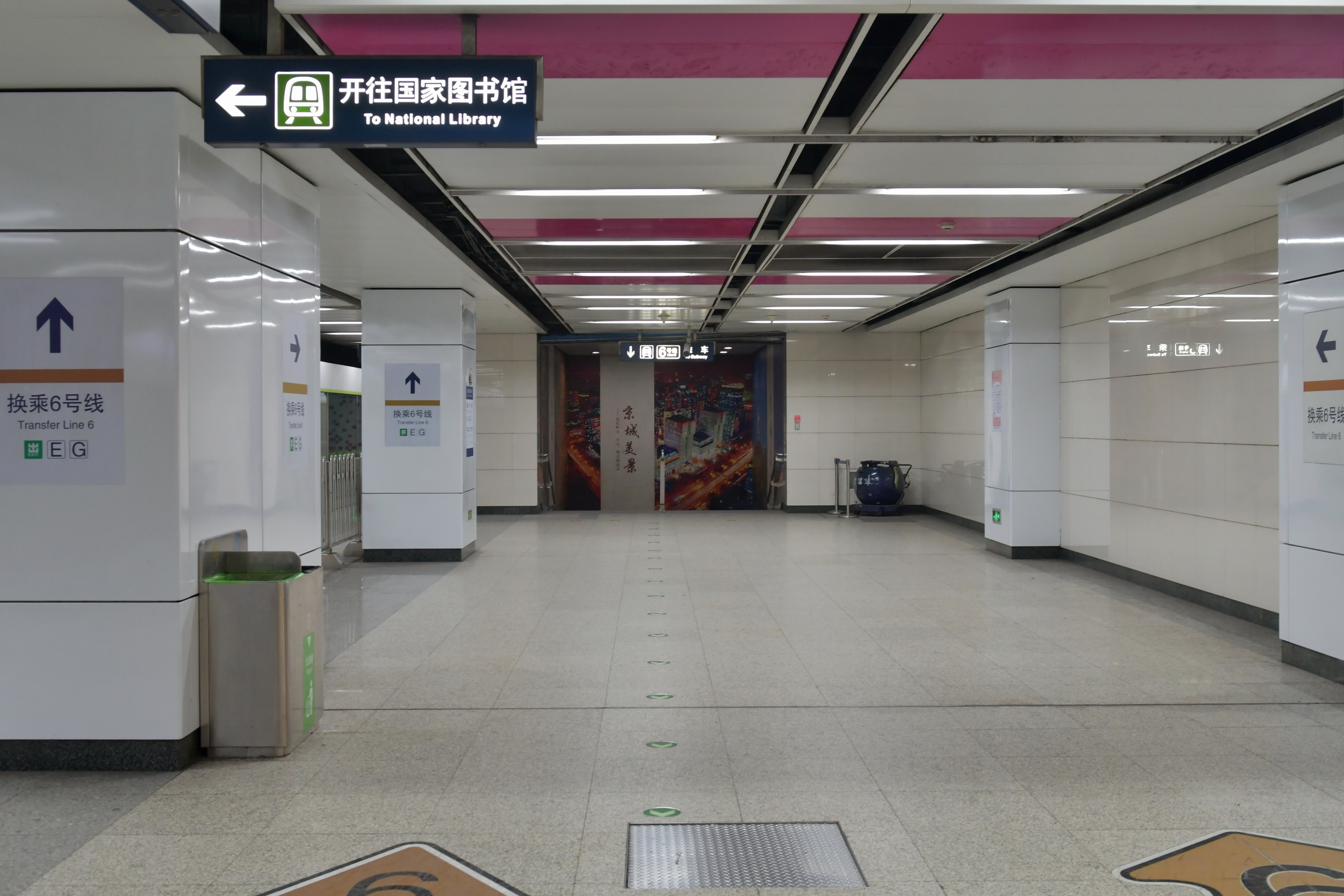
Transfer to line 6

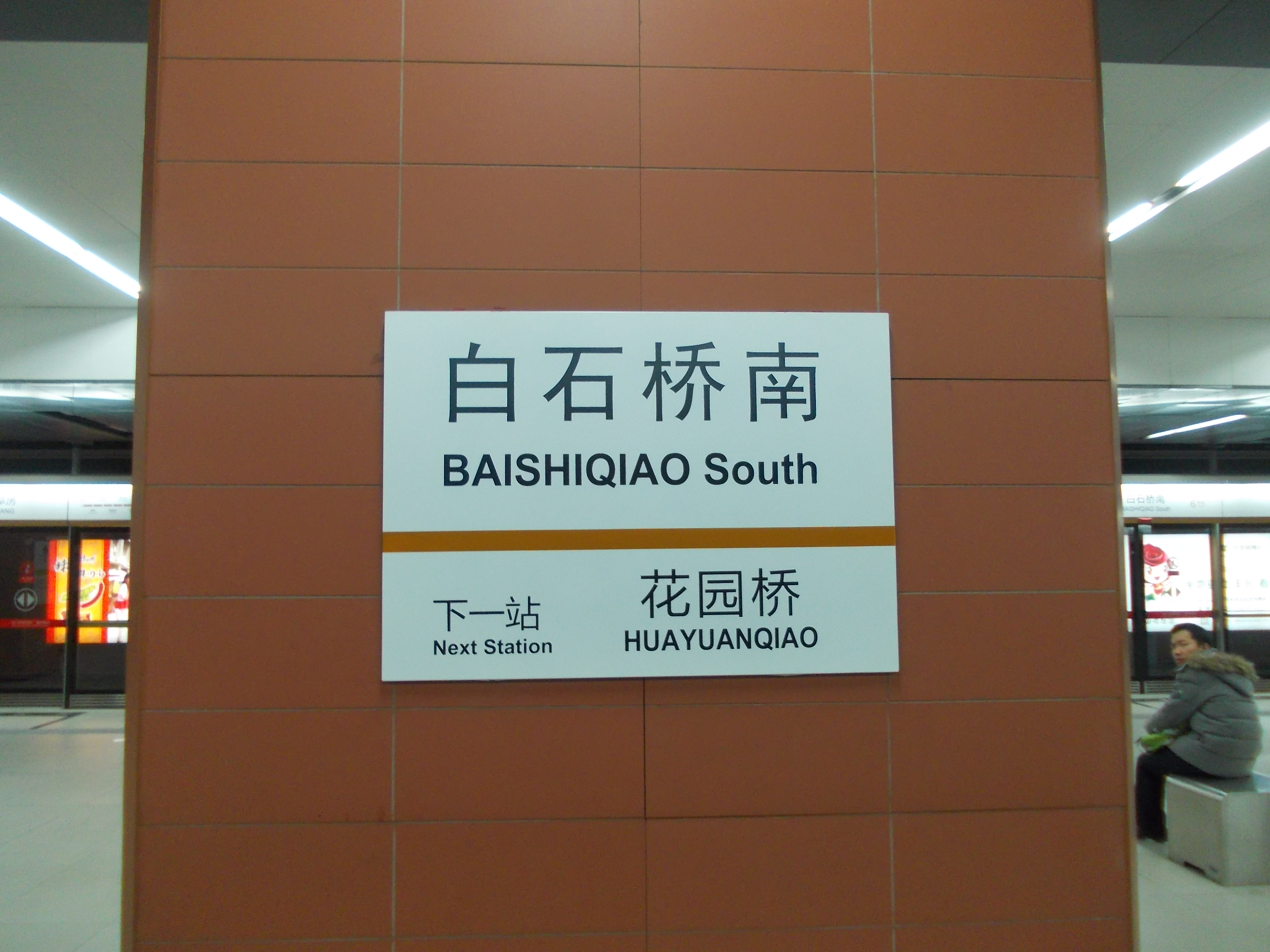
Platform sign of line 6

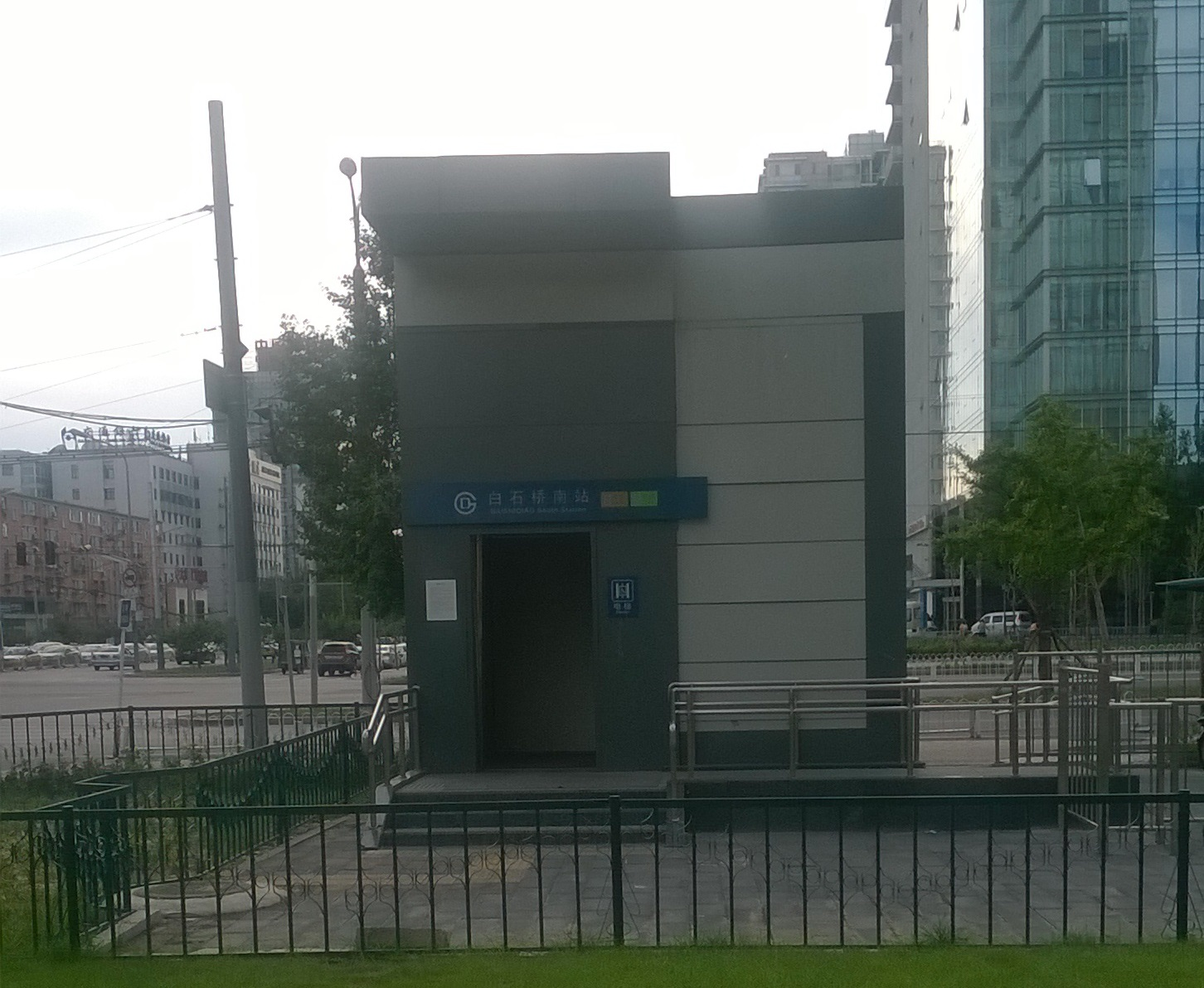
Baishiqiaonan station elevator

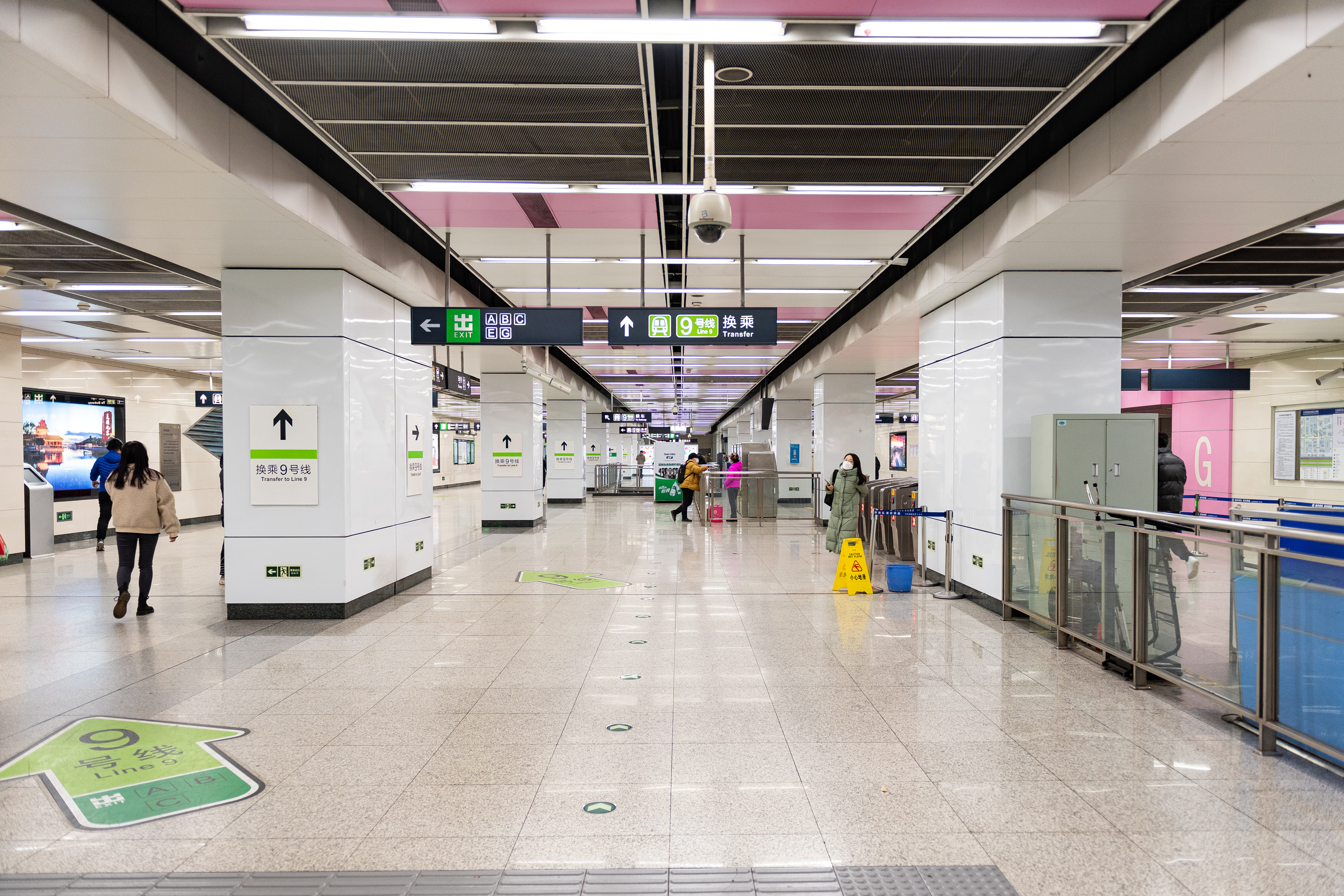
Line 6 concourse

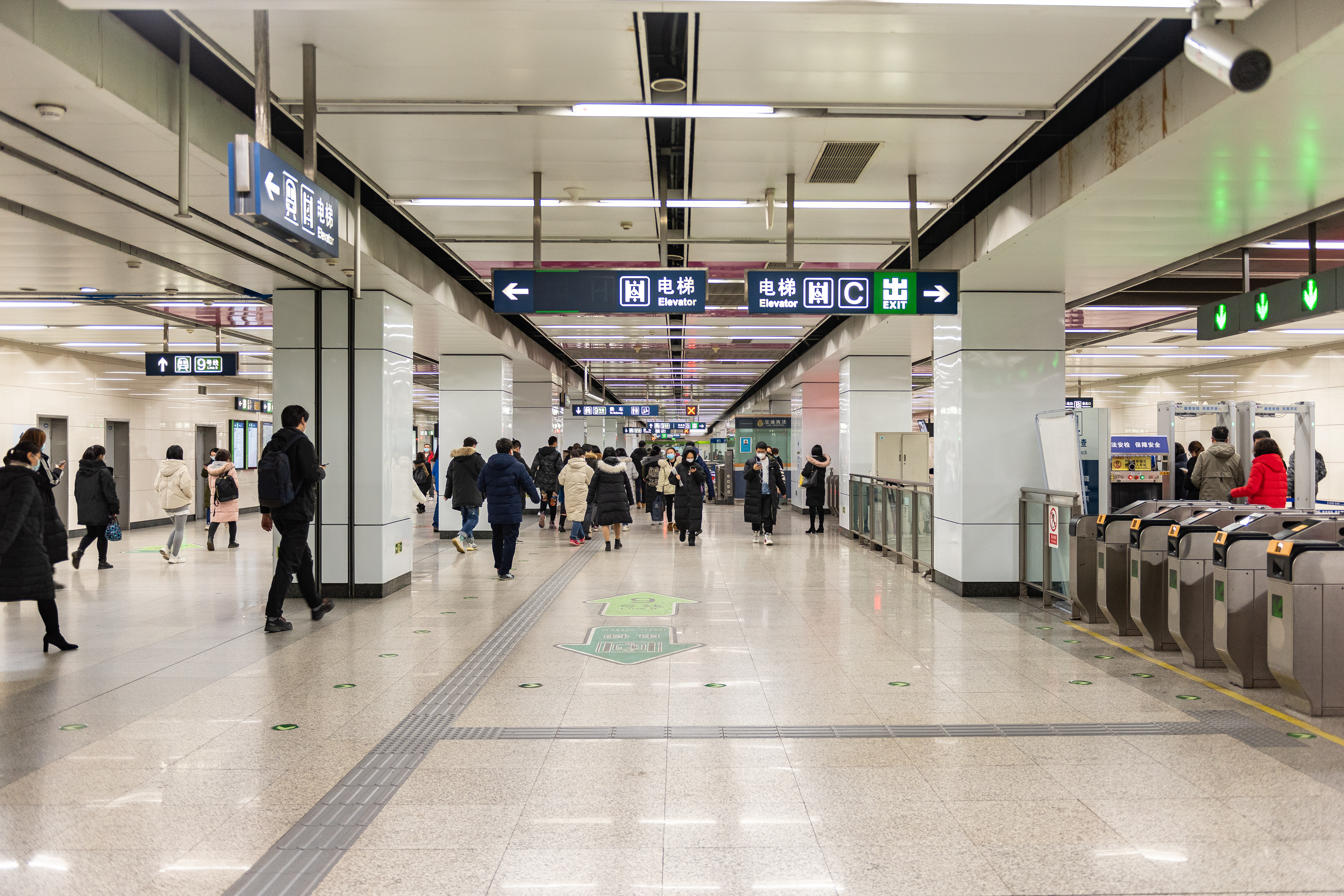
Line 9 concourse
