= Military Museum station =

Beijing Subway interchange station

Coordinates: 39°54′27″N 116°19′17″E

Military Museum 军事博物馆
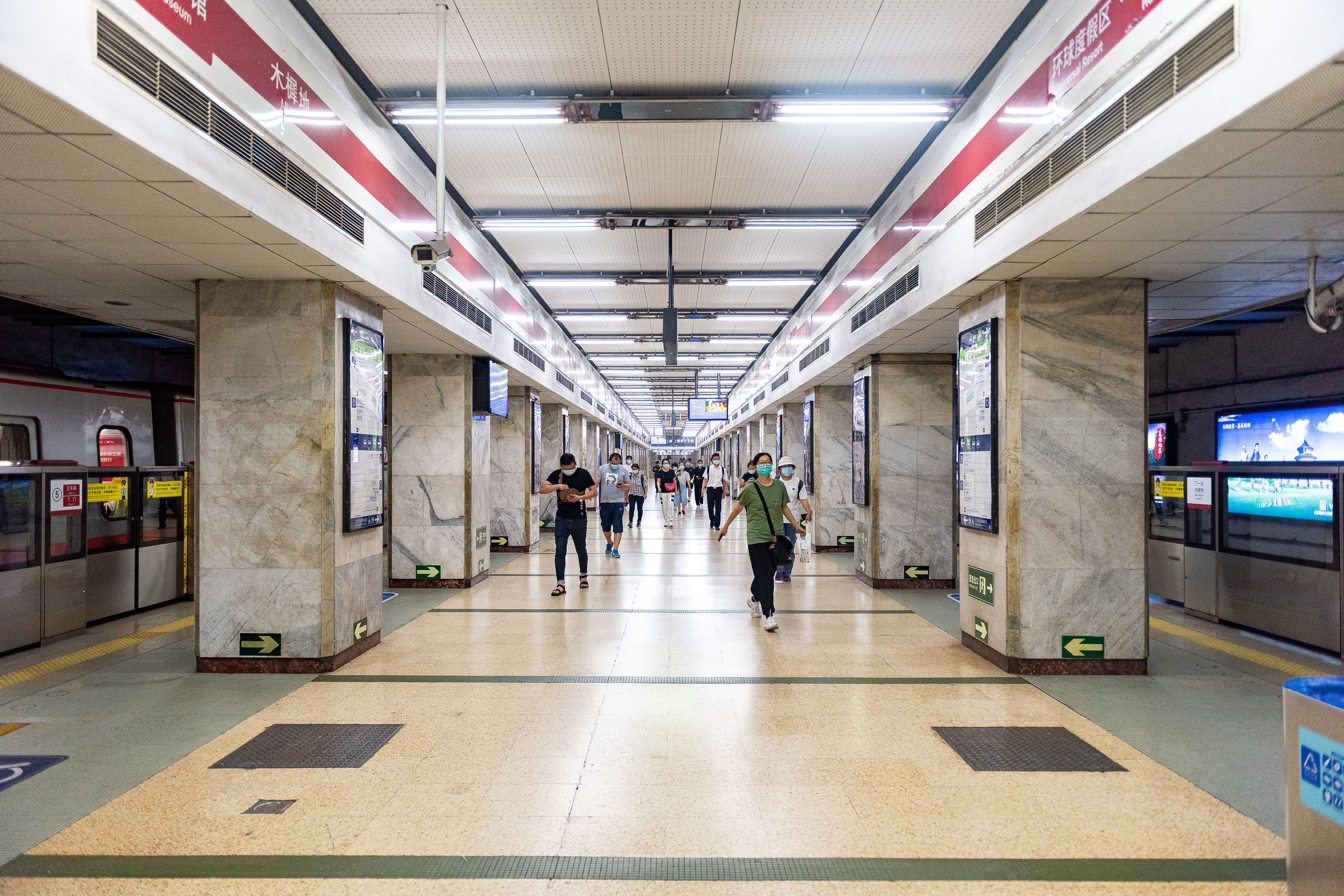
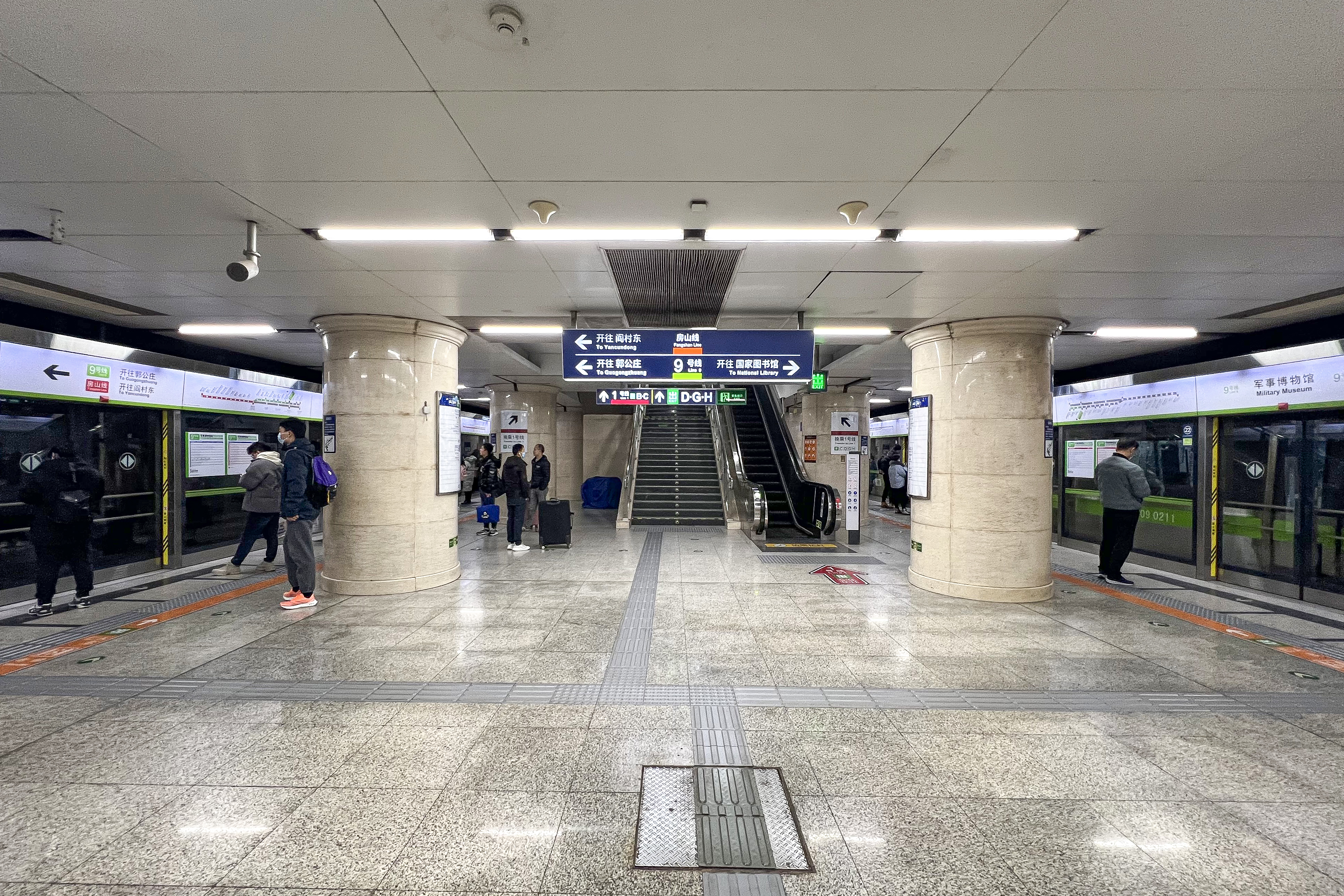
- Line 1 platform Line 9 platform

General information
- Location: Fuxing Road and Yangfangdian Road / Junbo West Road (军博西路); Yangfangdian Subdistrict, Haidian District, Beijing; China
- Operator: Beijing Mass Transit Railway Operation Corporation Limited
- Lines: Line 1; Line 9; Fangshan line (through service to Line 9)
- Platforms: 4 (2 island platforms)
- Tracks: 4

Construction
- Structure type: Underground
- Accessible: Yes

Other information
- Station code: 111 (line 1)

History
- Opened: January 15, 1971; 55 years ago (Line 1); December 21, 2013; 12 years ago (Line 9)

Services
Preceding station	Beijing Subway	Following station
Gongzhufen towards Pingguoyuan	Line 1	Muxidi towards Universal Resort
Baiduizi towards National Library	Line 9	Beijing West railway station towards Guogongzhuang
Baiduizi towards National Library	Fangshan line Through service (weekday peak only)	Beijing West railway station towards Yancundong
Location
- Location within Beijing

Military Museum station (simplified Chinese: 军事博物馆站; traditional Chinese: 軍事博物館站; pinyin: Jūnshì Bówùguǎn Zhàn) is an interchange station on Line 1 and Line 9 of the Beijing Subway. It located near the Military Museum of the Chinese People's Revolution.

== Transfer ==
The transfer hall between Line 1 and Line 9 opened on 21 December 2013.

== Station layout ==
Both the line 1 and 9 stations have island platforms.

== Exits ==
The station has 9 exits, lettered A, B, C1, C2, D, E1, E2, G, and H. Exit A is accessible.

== Gallery ==
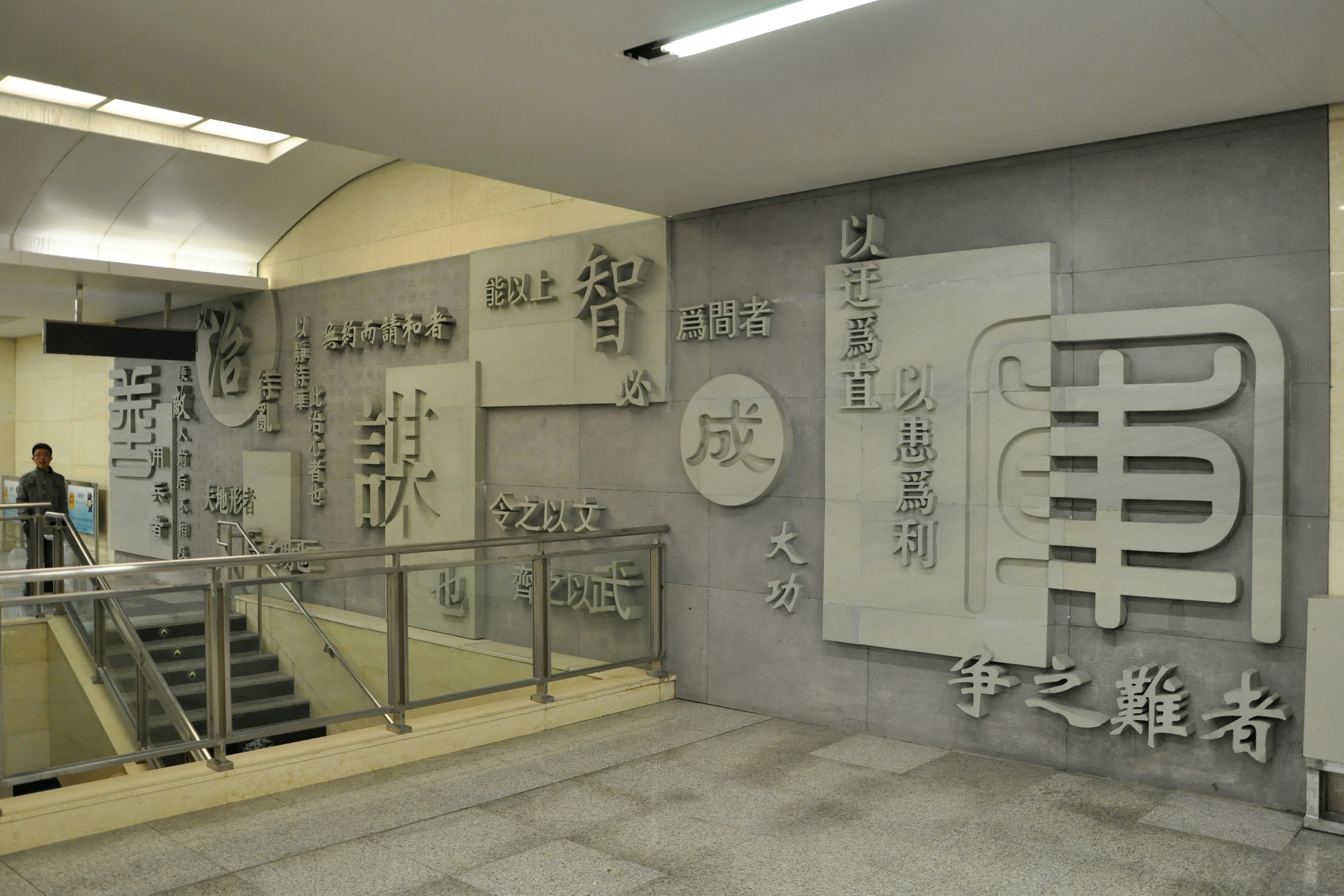
Artwork in the line 9 concourse (Theme: “The Art of War”)

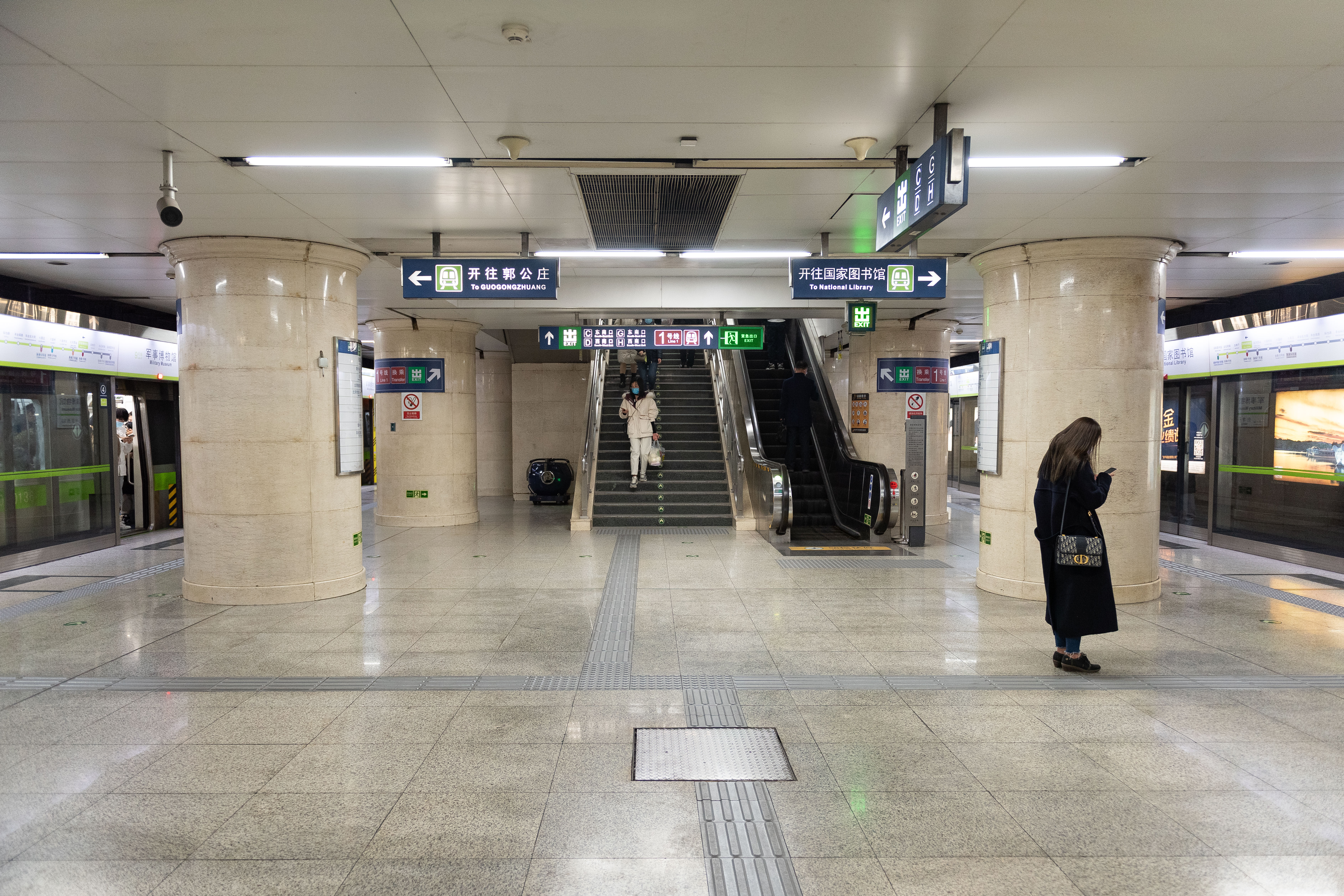
Line 9 platform (February 2021)

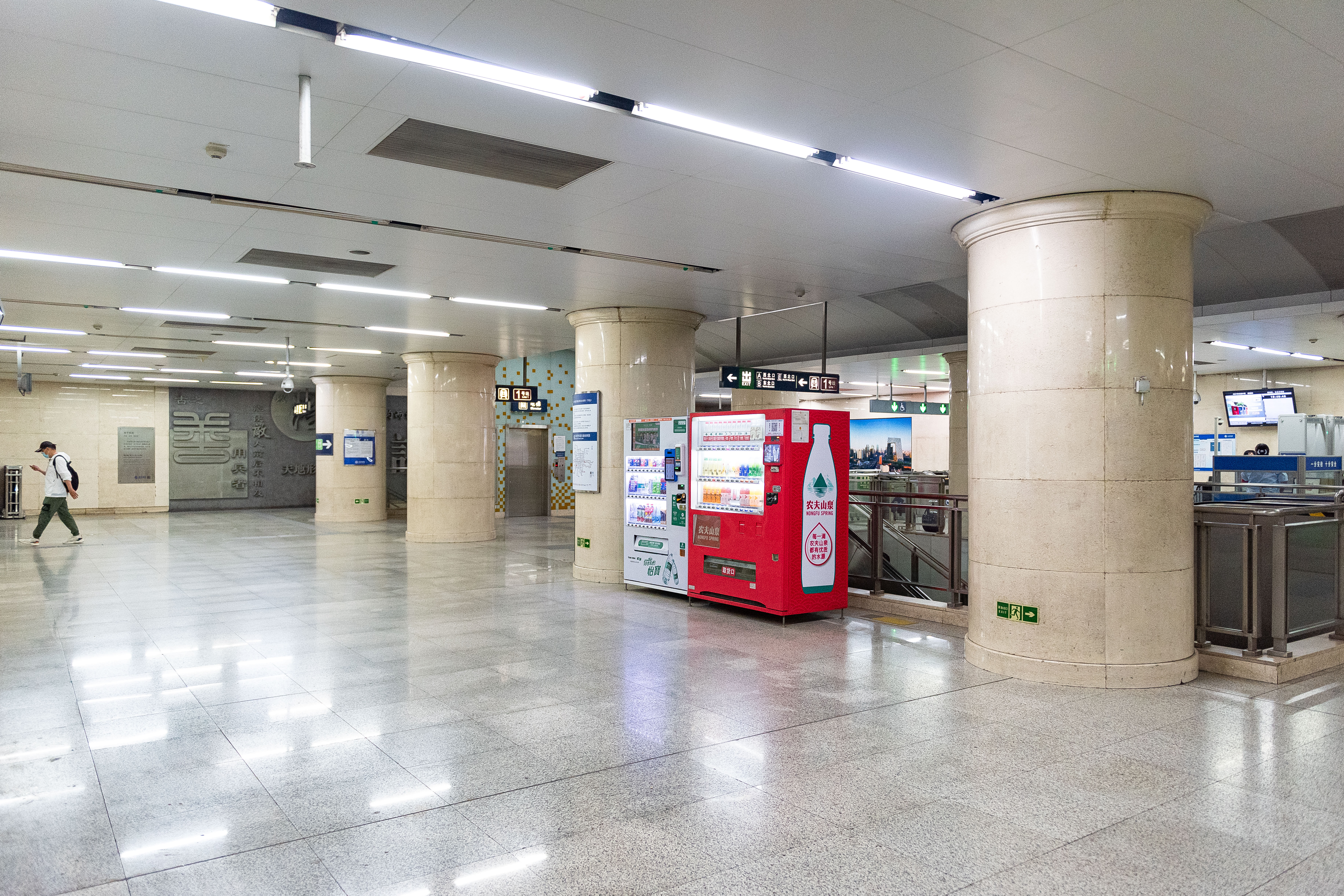
Line 9 north concourse

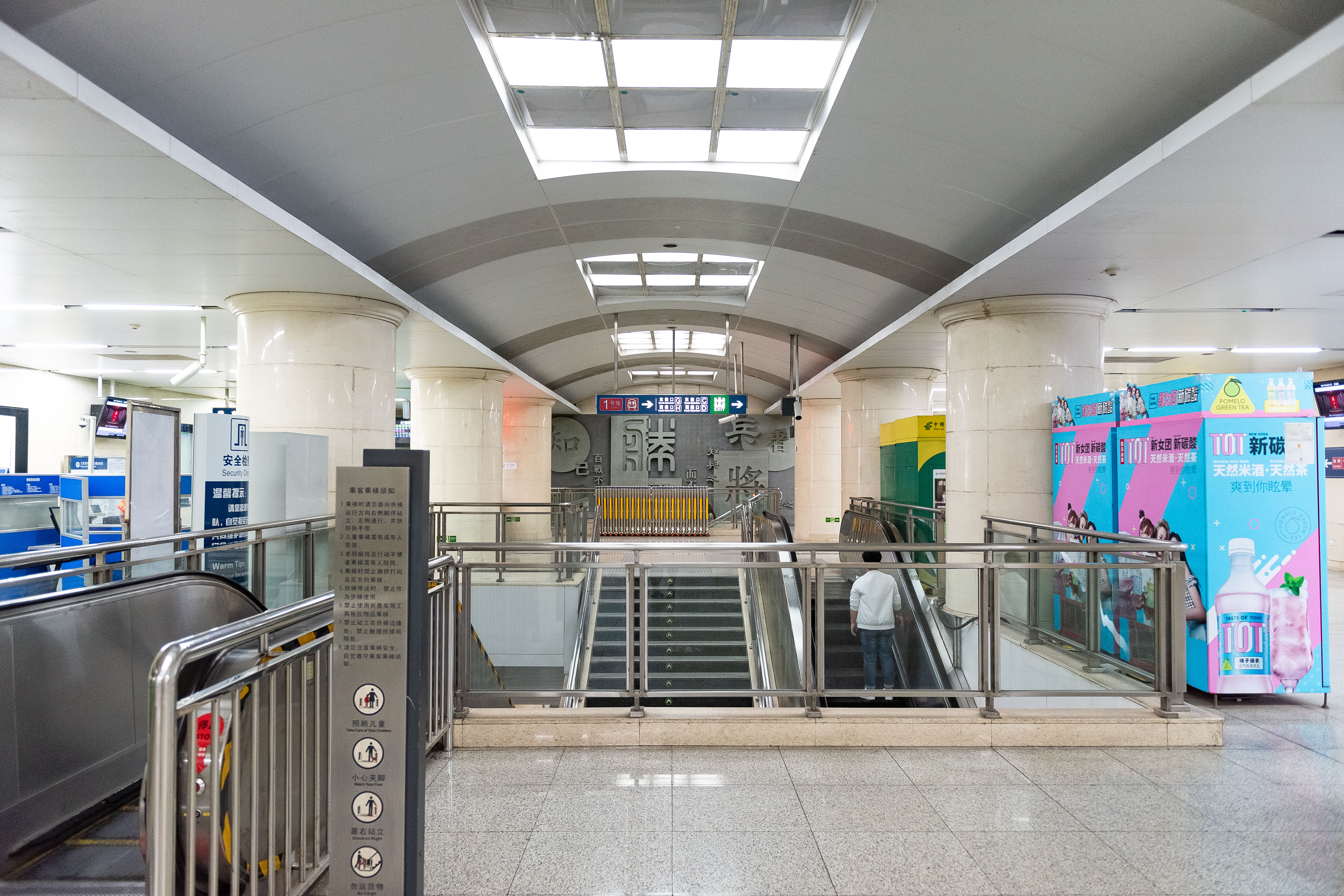
Line 9 south concourse

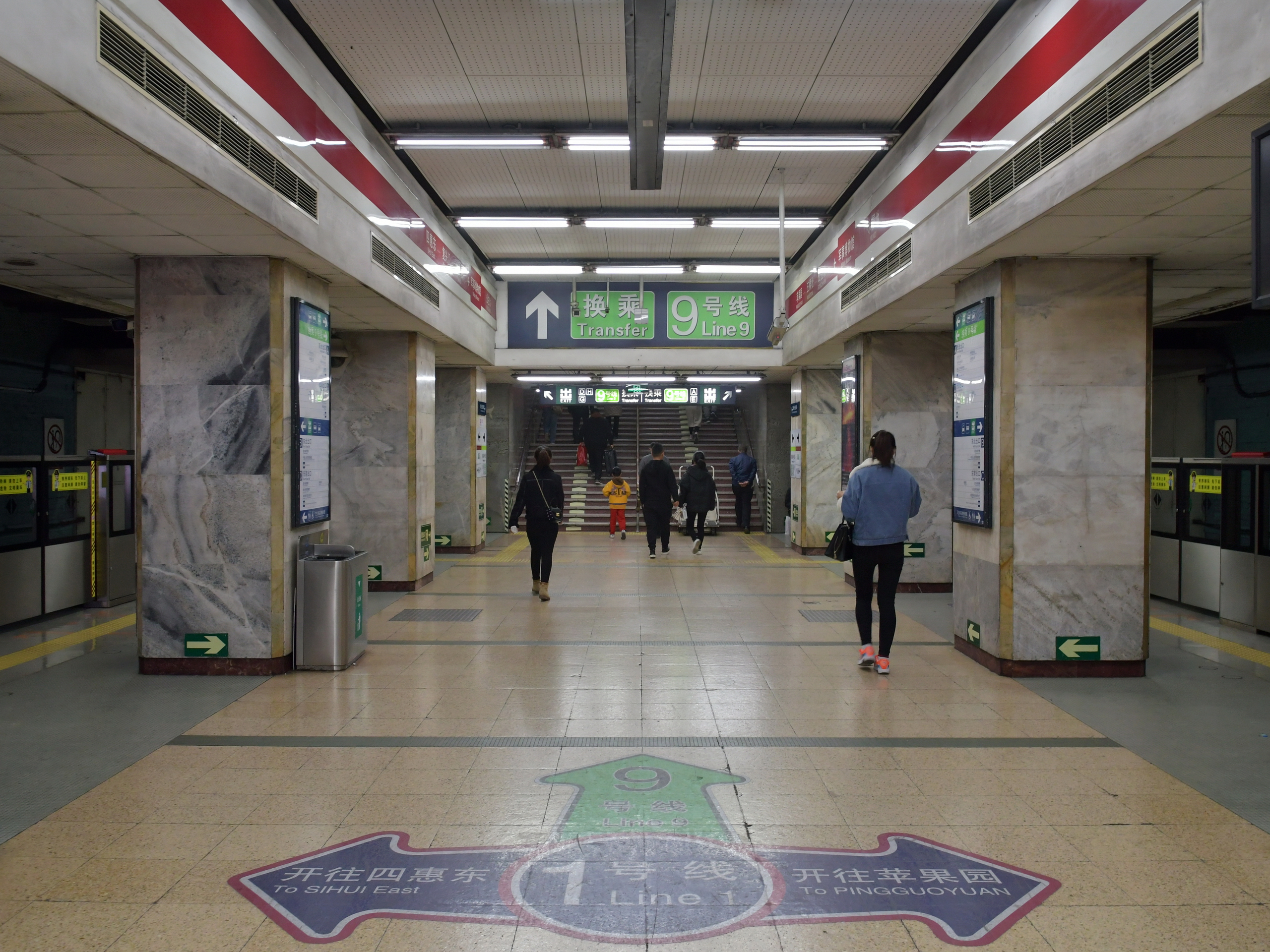
Line 1 platform (November 2018)
