= Huayuan Qiao station =

Beijing Subway station

Huayuan Qiao 花园桥
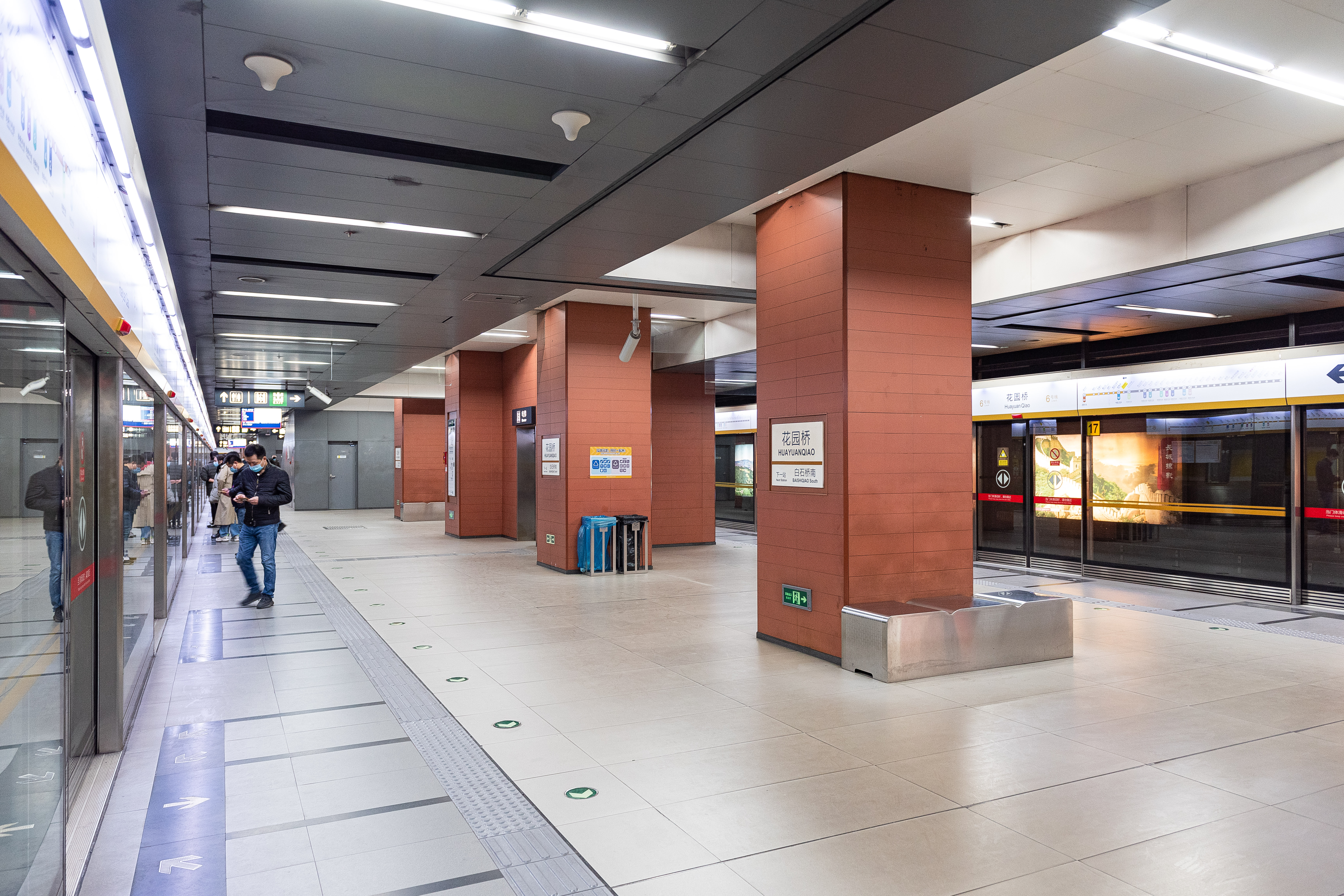
- Platform

General information
- Location: Linglong Road (玲珑路) / West Chegongzhuang Road (车公庄西路) and West 3rd Ring Road North; Balizhuang Subdistrict, Haidian District, Beijing; China
- Coordinates: 39.9324°N 116.3107°E
- Operator: Beijing Mass Transit Railway Operation Corporation Limited
- Line: Line 6
- Platforms: 2 (1 island platform)
- Tracks: 2

Construction
- Structure type: Underground
- Accessible: Yes

History
- Opened: December 30, 2012; 13 years ago

Services
Preceding station	Beijing Subway	Following station
Cishousi towards Jin'anqiao	Line 6	Baishiqiaonan towards Luyang
Location
- Location within Beijing

Huayuan Qiao (simplified Chinese: 花园桥站; traditional Chinese: 花園橋站; pinyin: Huāyuán Qiáo Zhàn) is a station on Line 6 of the Beijing Subway. This station opened on December 30, 2012.

== Station layout ==
The station has an underground island platform.

== Exits ==
There are 6 exits, lettered A, B1, B2, C, D1, and D2. Exits A and D are accessible.

== Gallery ==
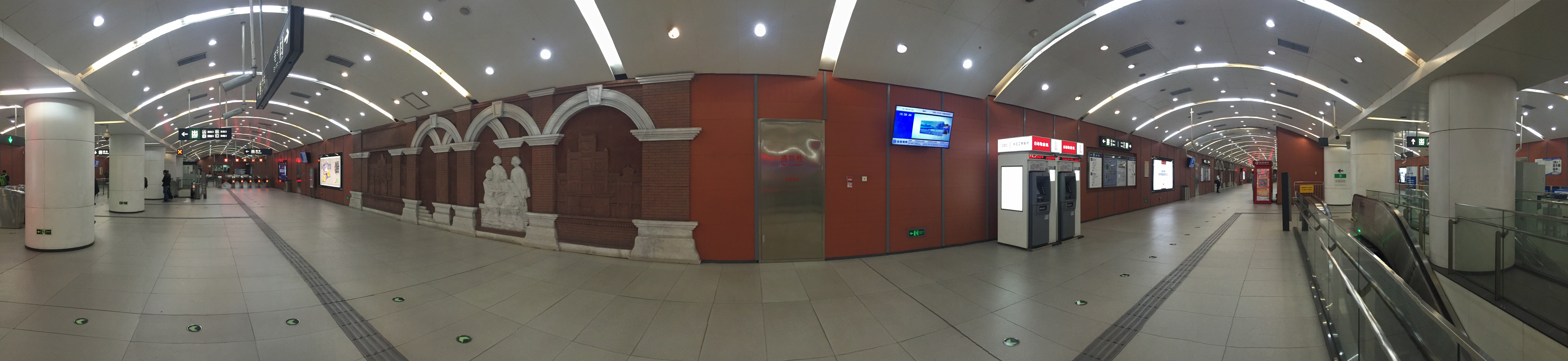
panorama of Huayuanqiao Station hall
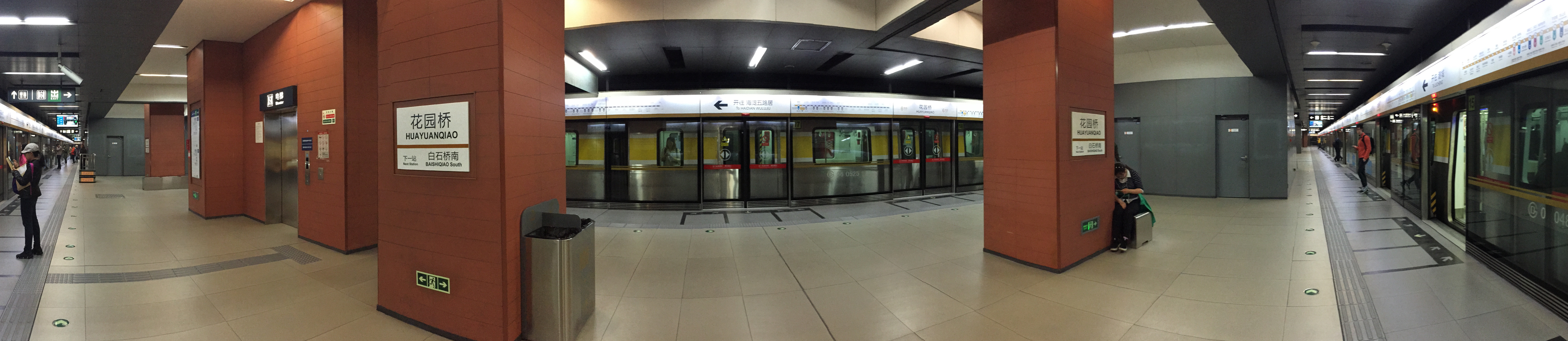
platform in 2017
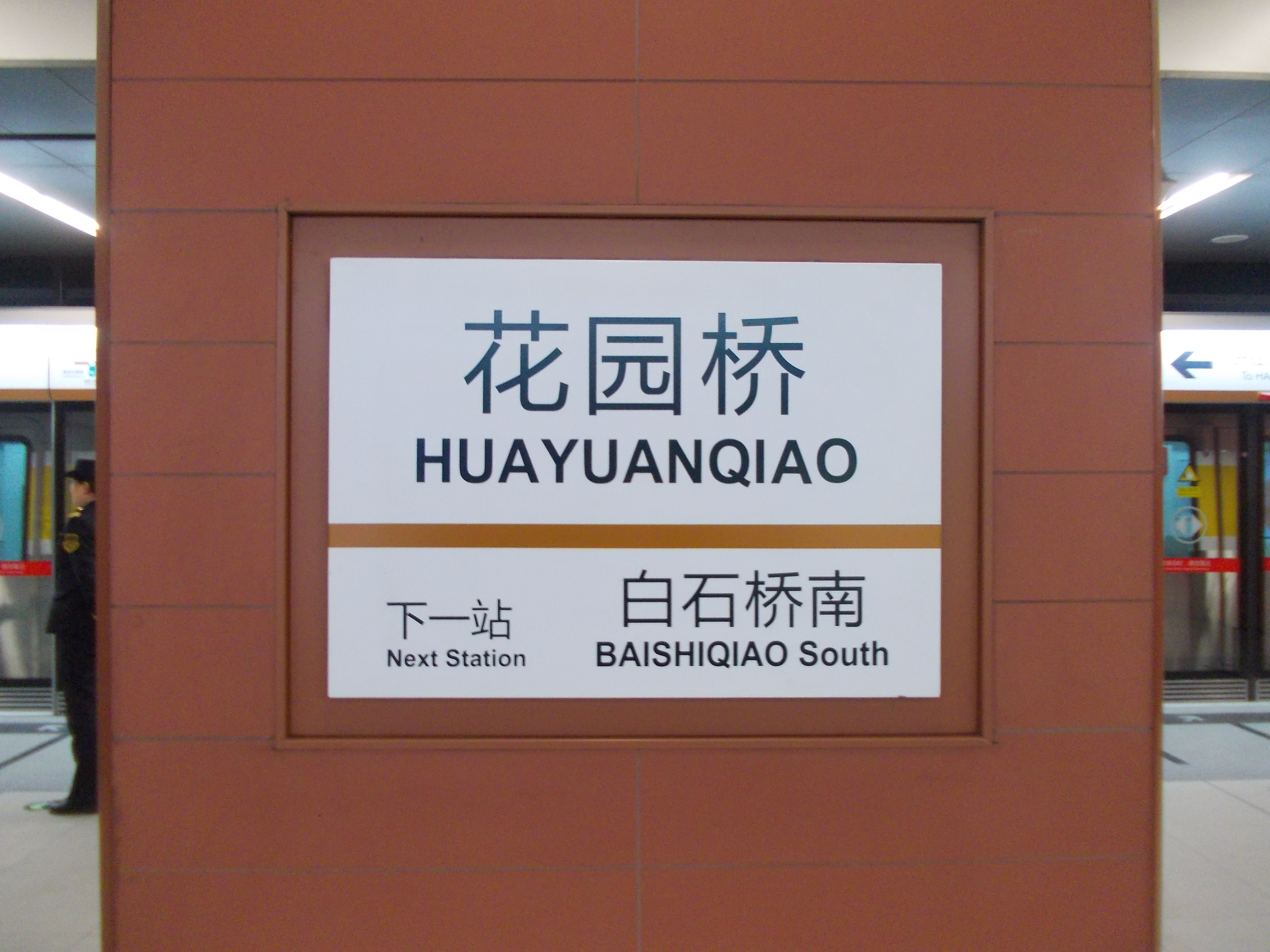
Sign

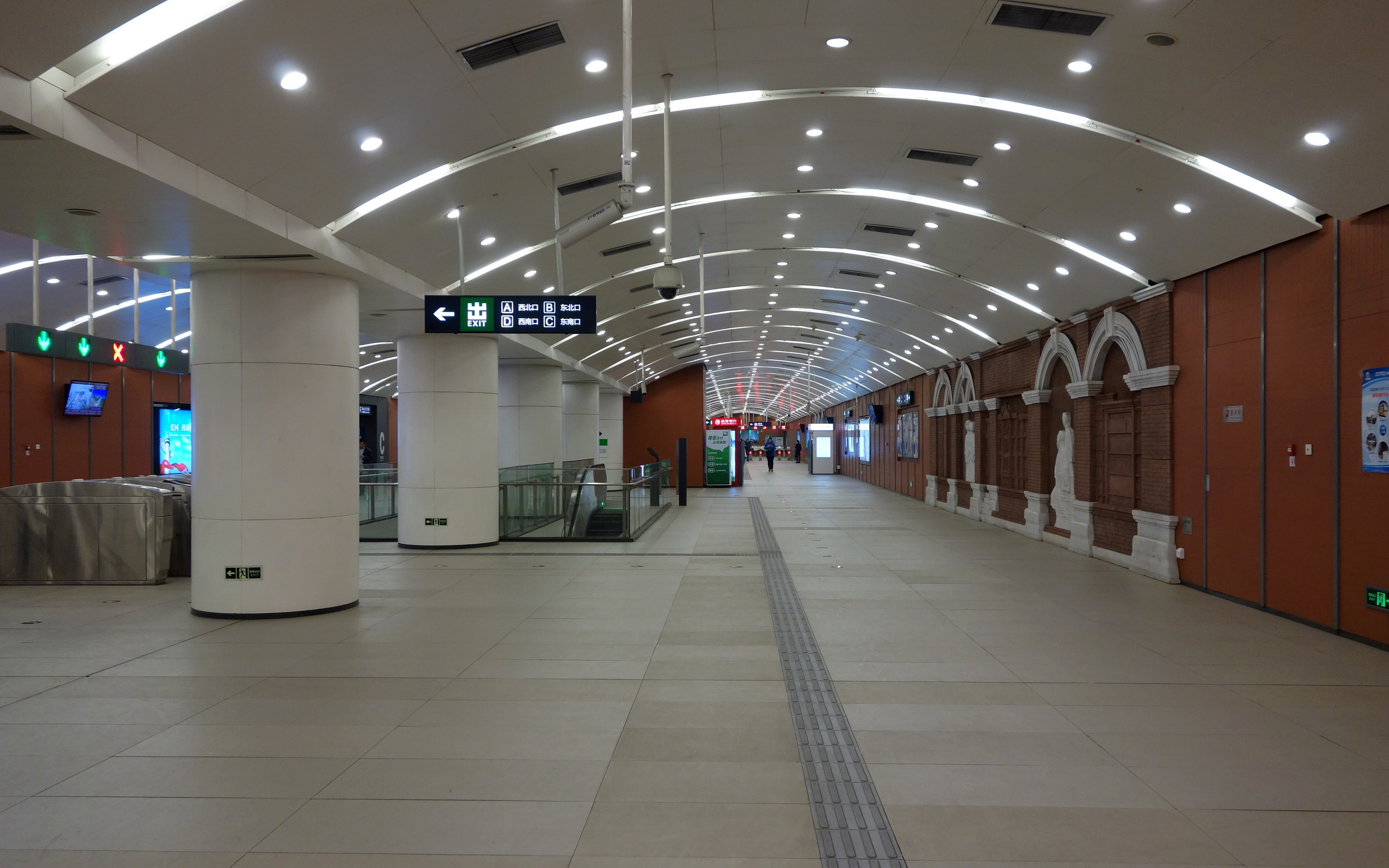
Station hall
