= 77th Group Army =

Chinese military unit

People's Liberation Army Ground Force 77th Group Army
- 第七十七集团军
- Active: 1985–present
- Country: China
- Allegiance: Chinese Communist Party
- Branch: People's Liberation Army Ground Force
- Type: Group army
- Part of: Western Theater Command Ground Force
- Garrison/HQ: Chongzhou, Chengdu, Sichuan
- Engagements: Long March; Second Sino-Japanese War; World War II; Chinese Civil War; Korean War; First Indochina War; Sino-Indian War; Vietnam War; Sino-Vietnamese War

Commanders
- Current commander: Major General Wang Suocheng
- Political Commissar: Major General Kuang Ming
- Notable commanders: Chen Geng; Xie Fuzhi; Zhou Xihan; Liu Youguang; Lin Biao

Insignia
- NATO Map Symbol

The 77th Group Army (Chinese: 第七十七集团军; pinyin: Dì Qīshíqī Jítuánjūn), Unit 31667, formerly the 13th Group Army, is a military formation of the Chinese People's Liberation Army Ground Force (PLAGF). The 77th Group Army is one of thirteen total group armies of the PLAGF, the largest echelon of ground forces in the People's Republic of China, and one of two assigned to the nation's Western Theater Command.

== History ==
The 13th Group Army (Military Unit Cover Designator (MUCD) 56005) was established in 1985 after the disbandment of the 50th Army. It incorporated the 149th Division, which had been part of the 50th Army.

During the Sino-Vietnamese War, the Kunming Military Region took responsibility for Chinese operations during the Battle of Lào Cai, which involved the 11th and 13th Armies from the Kunming Military Region itself, and the 14th Army from the Chengdu Military Region, totaling about 125,000 troops. The three armies was followed by the reserve 149th Division of the 50th Army, as well as many support units. The invasion comprised three prongs of advances: while the 11th Army was assigned to attack Phong Thổ before hooking up to Sa Pa and Lào Cai from the west, the 14th Army was ordered to take Mường Khương and move against Lào Cai from the east; the central thrust was undertaken by the 13th Army, targeting Lào Cai itself, as well as the township of Cam Đường to the south.

Blasko 2002, drawing upon the Directory of PRC Military Personalities, 1999 and 2000 editions, wrote that the 13 GA (MUCD 56005), at Chongqing, comprised the 37th Motorized Infantry Division (MUCD 56013), the 149th Motorized Infantry Division (MUCD 56016) at Emei, Sichuan, an Armored Brigade (MUCD 56017) at Pengzhou, Sichuan, an Artillery Brigade (MUCD 56014) at Chongqing, and an Anti-Aircraft Artillery Brigade (MUCD 56018) at Mianyang, Sichuan.

== Organization ==
- 39th Heavy Combined-Arms Brigade
- 40th Mountain Combined-Arms Brigade
- 55th Light Combined-Arms Brigade
- 139th Heavy Combined-Arms Brigade
- 150th Mountain Combined-Arms Brigade
- 181st Medium Combined-Arms Brigade
- 77th Special Operations Brigade
- 77th Army Aviation Brigade - Operates Mi-17 helicopters
- 77th Artillery Brigade
- 77th Air Defense Brigade
- 77th Engineering Brigade
- 77th Chemical Defense Brigade
- 77th Service Support Brigade

== Leaders ==
=== Commanders ===
- Zhou Xihan: 1949–1952
- Chen Kang: 1952–1956
- Xu Qixiao: 1956–1965
- Wu Xiaomin: 1965–1968
- Gu Yongwu: 1968–1978
- Yan Shouqing: 1978–1980
- An Yufeng: 1980–1983
- Yang Anzhong: 1983–1985
- Chen Shijun: 1985–1994
- Gui Quanzhi: 1994–2000
- Zhang Youxia: 2000–2005
- Wang Xixin: 2005–2007
- Zhao Zongqi: 2007–2008
- Xu Yong: 2008–2013
- Wang Kai: 2013–2017
- Lin Huomao: 2017–2021
- Wang Suocheng: 2021–present

=== Political commissars ===
- Liu Youguang: 1949–1951
- Jin Rubai: 1951–1954
- Zhang Lixiong: 1954–1955
- Kong Junbiao: 1955–1961
- Lei Qiyun: 1961–1969
- Duan Siying: 1965–1969
- He Yunfeng: 1969–1970
- Zhao Wei: 1970–1975
- Geng Zhongxian: 1975–1978
- Qiao Xueting: 1978–1982
- Ai Weiren: 1983–1988
- Xiao Huaishu: 1988–1993
- Chen Peizhong: 1993–1996
- Qiu Jian: 1996–2005
- Cui Changjun: 2005–2010
- Diao Guoxin: 2010–2012
- Zheng Xuan: 2013–2017
- Li Zehua： 2017–2021
- Kuang Ming： 2021–present
