= Battle of Lào Cai =

1979 battle of the Sino-Vietnamese War

- Part of the Sino-Vietnamese War
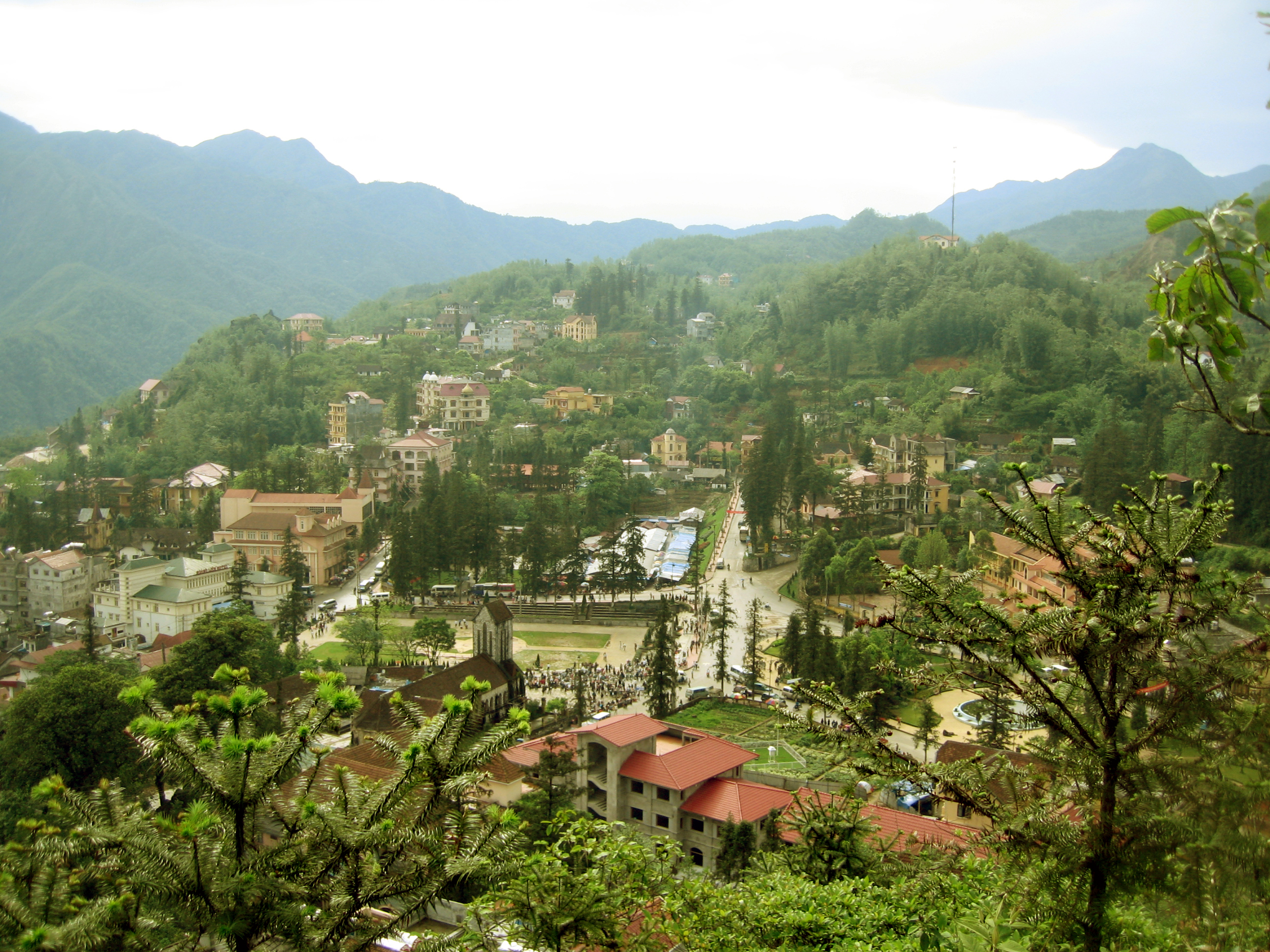
- Sapa town in Lào Cai Province
Date	17 February – 5 March 1979
Location	Northern Hoàng Liên Sơn province and northeastern Lai Châu province, Vietnam
Result	See Aftermath section

Belligerents
China	Vietnam

Commanders and leaders
Yang Dezhi	Vũ Lập; Ma Vĩnh Lan

Units involved
11th Army; 32nd Division; 13th Army; 37th, 38th, 39th Divisions; 14th Army; 40th, 41st, 42nd Divisions; 50th Army; 149th Division; 4th Artillery Division; 65th Anti-Aircraft Division	316th Division; 98th, 148th, 174th Infantry Regiments; 187th Artillery; 345th Division; 118th, 121st, 124th Infantry Regiments; 190th Artillery; 168th Artillery Regiment; 297th Anti-Aircraft Regt.; 89th Engineer Regiment; 16th Armed Police Regt.

Strength
At least 8 regular divisions ~125,000 regular troops	2 regular divisions plus ~20,000 regional troops and militia

Casualties and losses
Chinese claim: 7,886 casualties (including 2,812 killed); Vietnamese claim: 11,500 casualties 66 tanks/APCs destroyed	Chinese claim: ~13,500 casualties (including 33.3% of 345th Division wounded or killed, over 1,000 of 316th Division killed.)

The Battle of Lào Cai was fought between Chinese and Vietnamese forces during the Sino-Vietnamese War. Though the Chinese sustained heavy losses in fighting, they were successful in capturing and occupying the city of Lào Cai and the surrounding towns.

== Planning and order of battle ==
The Chinese People's Liberation Army (PLA) Kunming Military Region took responsibility for Chinese operations in Lào Cai direction, which involved the 11th and 13th Armies from the Kunming Military Region itself, and the 14th Army from the Chengdu Military Region, totaling about 125,000 troops. The three armies was followed by the reserve 149th Division of the 50th Army, as well as many support units, including the 4th Artillery and the 65th Anti-Aircraft Divisions. The invasion comprised three prongs of advances: while the 11th Army was assigned to attack Phong Thổ before hooking up to Sapa and Lào Cai from the west, the 14th Army was ordered to take Mường Khương and move against Lào Cai from the east; the central thrust was undertaken by the 13th Army, targeting Lào Cai itself, as well as the township of Cam Đường to the south.

For the Vietnamese side, historians believe that the defense of the Hoàng Liên Sơn Province (modern-day Lào Cai and Yên Bái provinces) was conducted by several regiments of the Vietnam People's Army (VPA), some of which consisted of the regular 345th and 316th Divisions. The 345th, which had originally been an economic construction unit transformed into a combat division, took responsibility for defending Bảo Thắng, while the elite 316th was garrisoned in the Bình Lư area. These two regular divisions were backed up by some 20,000 troops from regional and militia units, including the 192nd and 254th Regiments of Lào Cai province, one artillery battalion and eight infantry battalions of its districts, as well as the 16th Regiment, some companies and about a dozen border stations of the Armed Police. All Vietnamese forces on the Western Wing were under the command of the 2nd Military Region led by Major General Vũ Lập.

== Battle ==
The battle began before the dawn of 17 February by a Chinese artillery barrage against Vietnamese positions. The first objectives for the PLA were the towns of Bát Xát, Mường Khương, and Pha Long. 20,000 troops from the PLA 13th Army crossed the Red River into Bát Xát using pontoon bridges, quickly overrunning the Vietnamese defense held by the VPA 192nd Regiment, as well as the independent 2nd and Lào Cai Battalions. No attack was staged against Phong Thổ on the first day.

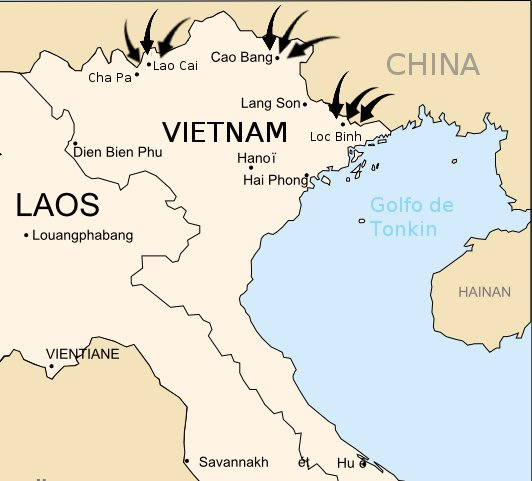
Lào Cai front alongside two other main fronts: Cao Bằng and Lạng Sơn in 1979

The brunt of Chinese assaults fell on the VPA 345th Division, which resisted toughly. Two Chinese regiments were held off at Mống Xến and in the area south of Chu Dang and west of Nhạc Sơn, which forced the PLA to change their plan into a mop-up operation against the Vietnamese strongholds. By the dusk of 18 February, the Vietnamese defenders in Bảo Thắng and Cốc Lếu had been completely encircled. At 14:00 on 19 February, the PLA captured Lào Cai City. In response to the loss of the provincial capital, the VPA 345th Division command sent one battalion from its 118th Regiment to reinforce its 121st Regiment's positions at Coc Tha, Dien Na, Dung Ha and Chan Uy, while the VPA 316th Division was mobilized eastward to Sapa.

Having taken Lào Cai, the PLA then sent troops, presumably from the 13th Army, to Cam Đường to the south, and another group (probably from the 14th Army) advancing along Highway 4D to Sapa, which was 38 km to the southwest. The Kunming Military Region Command used fresh elements from the 149th Division and the 11th Army to reinforce the 13th Army in the efforts against Cam Đường. A blocking position was established by four companies from the PLA 39th Division of the 13th Army on Highway 10 at Thay Nai to cut the VPA 345th Division from supply. The VPA 316th Division was then dispatched from Sapa to meet the approaching Chinese forces, and ran into contact on the secondary road between Lào Cai and Sapa on 22 February. From 22 to 25 February, its 148th Regiment launched repetitive attacks against the Chinese block at Thay Nai, but failed to break through and secure its way to Cam Đường. Two PLA divisions from the 13th Army, the 37th and 38th, were deployed against the VPA 345th Division, which was defending a narrow area north of Cam Đường. By 25 February, the Chinese had seized Cam Đường, yet were still struggling to exterminate pockets of Vietnamese resistance in Lào Cai and other towns under their control, a situation which had not ended until 27 February.

On 24 February, the PLA decided to supplement their reserves, the 149th Division, to the fight against the VPA 316th Division. Chinese efforts now concentrating on cutting off the retreat of the VPA 316th Division, as the PLA 447th Regiment skirted around Mount Phan Xi Pang through the Hoang Lien Son Pass and maneuvered toward the direction of Bình Lư, which was 44 km west of Sapa. In meantime, the rest of the 149th Division pushed toward Sapa along two roads parallel to Highway 10. Despite showing excellent combat performance, the VPA 316th Division was finally forced to retreat due to the lack of manpower. At 14:45 on 1 March, Sapa fell to the PLA. On the eastern wing of the offensive, Khoc Tiam succumbed to a night assault raging from 20:00 on 2 March to 14:45 on 3 March. At 19:00 on 3 March, all roads that connected Phong Thổ with Bình Lư and Pa Tần had been under Chinese control. On 4 March, Chinese forces eventually captured the town, thus successfully blocking the supply route to the VPA 316th Division from Lai Châu; the blocking position was at least 40 km from the Sino-Vietnamese border, becoming the deepest Chinese penetration in the war. The 316th Division finally ceased fighting on 5 March. On the same day, the Chinese government announced the withdrawal of troops from Vietnam.

== Aftermath ==
At the end of the battle, the Chinese claimed to have inflicted 13,500 Vietnamese casualties, while suffering 2,812 killed out of 7,886 casualties of their own. On the other hand, the Vietnamese claimed to have inflicted 11,500 Chinese casualties. Similar to the fighting in other fronts, during the Lào Cai campaign, the "human wave" tactic was thoroughly applied by the PLA for every smallest objective, according to a Vietnamese soldier in an interview by French journalist Jean-Pierre Gallois: "The Chinese infantry advance shoulder to shoulder to make sure the minefields are cleared... When they moved out of Lào Cai they were as numerous and close together as rice in the paddy fields." As Sapa was a town possessing almost no strategic value, the Chinese campaign in the western front did not end with a notable victory. The PLA did, however, succeed in at least one of their key goals – engaging a considerable Vietnamese regular force and inflicting heavy losses, even at a high cost for themselves.

== See also ==
- Sino-Vietnamese War
