= Wang Kai (born 1963) =

Chinese general

- 王凯

Commander of the Tibet Military District
- Incumbent
- Assumed office March 2021
- Preceded by: Wang Haijiang

Personal details
- Born: April 1963 (age 62–63) Meishan County, Sichuan, China
- Party: Chinese Communist Party

Military service
- Allegiance: People's Republic of China
- Branch/service: People's Liberation Army Ground Force
- Years of service: ?–present
- Rank: Lieutenant general

Chinese name
- Simplified Chinese: 王凯
- Traditional Chinese: 王凱
Transcriptions
Standard Mandarin
- Hanyu Pinyin: Wáng Kǎi

Wang Kai (Chinese: 王凯; born April 1963) is a lieutenant general (zhongjiang) of the People's Liberation Army (PLA) serving as commander of the Tibet Military District, succeeding Wang Haijiang in March 2021.

== Biography ==
Wang was born in Meishan County (now Meishan), Sichuan, in April 1963. During the 2008 Sichuan earthquake, Wang, the then 37th Division commander of the 13th Army, led the troops to the disaster area first. In 2009, he rose to become chief of staff of the 14th Army. In July 2013, he was made commander of the 13th Army. In April 2017, he was commissioned as deputy commander of the Western Theater Command Ground Force, he remained in that position until March 2021, when he was transferred to Tibet and given the position of commander of the Tibet Military District.

In October 2022, Wang was elected as a full member to the 20th Central Committee of the Chinese Communist Party.

Military offices
Preceded by Huang Yi (黄艺)	Chief of Staff of the 14th Army; 2009–2013	Succeeded by Deng Zhiping
Preceded by Xu Yong	Commander of the 13th Army; 2013–2017	Succeeded by Position revoked
Preceded by Wang Haijiang	Commander of the Tibet Military District; 2021–present	Incumbent
