= Zhou Xihan =

Founding Vice Admiral of the PLA Navy

Vice Admiral Zhou Xihan
- 周希汉
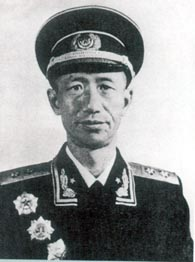

Personal details
- Born: 27 August 1913 Macheng, Hubei, Republic of China
- Died: November 7, 1988 (aged 75) Beijing, China
- Party: Chinese Communist Party
- Awards: August 1 Medal (Second Class); Order of Independence and Freedom (First Class); Order of Liberation (First Class); Red Star Medal of Honor (First Class)

Military service
- Allegiance: Communist China
- Branch/service: People's Liberation Army Navy
- Years of service: 1928-1987
- Rank: Vice Admiral
- Commands: PLA Navy Staff; Yunnan Garrison Command; 13th Army, Fourth Army Corps; 13th Army, Second Field Army; 10th Brigade, 4th Column; Southern Advance Detachment
- Battles/wars: Chinese Civil War; Huangma Uprising; Encirclement campaigns; Long March; Linfen–Fushan Campaign; Second Sino-Japanese War; Hundred Regiments Offensive; First Taiwan Strait Crisis

Zhou Xihan (Note: Chinese: 周希汉; pinyin: Zhōu Xīhàn; Wade-Giles: Chou¹ Hsi¹ Han⁴) (August 27, 1913 – November 7, 1988) was a Vice Admiral of the People's Liberation Army Navy. He was born in Dawu County, Hubei. He served in the Chinese Workers' and Peasants' Red Army and Eighth Route Army. He fought through the Chinese Civil Wars and Second Sino-Japanese War.

== Military career ==
He served as a staff officer at the headquarters of the Fourth Red Front Army, the Director of the Operations Section at the headquarters of the 9th Red Army and the 31st Army, and participated in the anti-encirclement and suppression operations in Hubei, Henan, Anhui, Sichuan, Shaanxi Soviet areas and later the Long March. After the outbreak of the war against Japanese invasion, Zhou became the Director of the Operations Section and the Chief of Staff of the Supplementary Regiment of the 386th Brigade, 129th Division of the Eighth Route Army. He participated in the battles of Qiwan Village and Shentouling and the anti-"Ninth Route encirclement and suppression operation" in Southeastern Shanxi. In June 1938, Zhou was made Chief of Staff of the 386th Brigade. Later, he entered Southern Hebei to carry out guerrilla warfare in the plains and participated in the command of the Battle of Xiangchenggu. In June 1940, he served as the Commander of the 386th Brigade and the Southern Advance Detachment of the Taiyue Military Region, and concurrently the Deputy Commander of the Second Military Division of the Taiyue Military Region. Zhou was one of the leading figures in the opening and development of anti-Japanese bases in Southern Yue and other areas. In November 1943, he received training at the Party School of the CPC Central Committee.

After the victory of the Second Sino-Japanese War, Zhou served as the Commander of the 10th Brigade of the 4th Column of the Jin-Ji-Lu-Yu Field Army, and led his troops to participate in the battles of Wenxia, Linfu, Lüliang, and marching to Western Henan, Luoyang, Wanxi, Wandong, Huaihai and so on. In 1949, he served as the Commander of the 13th Army of the Second Field Army and participated in the battles of Dujiang, Guangxi and Southern Yunnan. After the founding of the People's Republic, Zhou became the Commander of the Yunnan Garrison. In January 1951, he studied at the newly established People's Liberation Army Military Academy. His army remained at Yunnan and Guangxi as of 6 June 1951. Later, he was transferred to the post of Chief of Staff of the People's Liberation Army Navy through a program introduced by the Revolutionary Military Commission. During this period, he participated in the sinking of the Kuomintang naval frigate Taiping, the Battle of Yijiangshan Islands and the anti-landing military exercise on the Liaodong Peninsula. In 1955, Zhou was awarded the Second Class August 1 Medal, the First Class Order of Independence and Freedom and the First Class Order of Liberation. In December 1958, he became the deputy commander and consultant to the People's Liberation Army Navy. Shortly before his death, Zhou Xihan received the First Class Red Star Medal of Honor.

During the Civil War, Zhou Xihan led his troops to maim or capture 61 Kuomintang generals, most of whom were captured alive. Among them were eight two-star generals, such as Tang Yao, Commander of the Kuomintang Eighth Army Corps and Deputy Commander-in-Chief of the Kuomintang Army, Yu Yingqi and Huang Zhengcheng, personnel of the Yue-Gui Bandit Suppression Headquarters, and Qiu Xingxiang. In the spring of 1950, Zhou Xihan was ordered to train and equip the People's Army of Vietnam. He drilled them rigorously and demanded high standards, resulting in a rapid improvement in the Vietnamese troops' military skills. Four months later, Chen Geng conducted an assessment, and these soldiers achieved excellent results.

== Peculiarities ==
Zhou Xihan was said to have a long and heavy smoking habit. He started smoking at the age of seven or eight, and after joining the army, he was never seen without a cigarette. Despite his addiction, the general adhered to three rules of self-discipline: He wouldn't smoke before bed; he wouldn't smoke in front of his superiors; and he wouldn't smoke when meeting with his superiors. Amidst the hail of bullets, to satisfy his craving, general Zhou invented the "squatting pit smoking method": He would dig a pit in the field, cover half his body with it, squat in it, and use his coat to cover his head while smoking, making it impossible to emit any light within 200 meters. It is said that this method was widely adopted by smokers in various units during the Civil War.

Duan Jianxun recalled that after the founding of the republic, whenever commander Zhou inspected the troops, he would always go to the kitchen. Firstly, to check the food; secondly, to teach them certain skills. The commander was skilled at making dumplings, rolling out the dough, mixing the filling, and wrapping them quickly and well, producing dumplings that were fragrant and beautifully shaped. He was also adept at making pickled vegetables.

In February 1949, the 13th Army of the 4th Army Corps, Second Field Army was formed in Huangge Village, Yancheng County, Henan Province with Zhou as commander. Deng Xiaoping, the Field Army's political commissar, asked him: "Zhou Xihan, you should have been an army commander long ago. Do you know why it's only now that you've been promoted?"

Zhou answered: "Is it arrogance?" Deng Xiaoping nodded: "Exactly, that's what we need to do to curb your arrogance." Zhou Xihan said: "It's easier to change mountains and rivers than to change one's nature. I know this is my shortcoming, but I just can't get rid of it." Deng Xiaoping responded without any politeness: "Whether you can change it or not, you must change it! You absolutely must change it!" Zhou Xihan's arrogance was related to his upbringing. He became a section chief instead of a battalion commander, a brigade commander instead of a regimental commander, and an army commander instead of a division commander. He had fought in countless battles but had not a single bullet wound on his body.

In a certain month of the 1980s, Zhou Xihan was in Guangzhou for winter rest, staying at the Pearl River Hotel of the Guangzhou Military Region. Li Xiannian, then President of the People's Republic of China, was also passing through Guangzhou and staying at the same hotel. Li Xiannian had been Zhou's superior during the war years. His secretary suggested to the commander, "Should we arrange a time slot for visit?" Zhou waved his hand and said, "I don't want to join in the fun." Before he finished speaking, a waiter announced, "President Li Xiannian is here." Zhou remained seated. Li Xiannian, however, had already pushed open the door and entered, pointing at Zhou Xihan and saying, "Others know I'm here and drive all the way to see me. And you? You just sit here, not even giving me a proper greeting." Zhou replied, "I went to rest early. I was afraid your threshold would be too high and I'd trip over it. How was I supposed to know you wanted to come see me?" Li Xiannian sighed, "You're so stubborn!"

== In popular culture ==
In the 2013 Chinese movie Commander Zhou Xihan, he was portrayed by actor Shao Bing.
