= Tam Duong =

Tam Duong may refer to several places in Vietnam, including:

- Tam Dương District, a rural district of Vĩnh Phúc Province in the Red River Delta region
- Tam Đường District, a rural district of Lai Châu Province in the Northwest region
  - Tam Đường, a township and capital of Tam Đường District
