= Liu Wanlong =

- 刘万龙

Commander of Xinjiang Military District
- In office January 2017 – March 2021
- Preceded by: Peng Yong
- Succeeded by: Wang Haijiang

Commander of Gansu Military District
- In office March 2014 – January 2017
- Preceded by: Chen Zhishu
- Succeeded by: Wang Wenqing

Personal details
- Born: July 1962 (age 63–64) Dongchangfu District, Liaocheng, Shandong, China
- Party: Chinese Communist Party

Military service
- Allegiance: People's Republic of China
- Branch/service: People's Liberation Army Ground Force
- Years of service: ?–present
- Rank: Lieutenant general

Chinese name
- Simplified Chinese: 刘万龙
- Traditional Chinese: 劉萬龍
Transcriptions
Standard Mandarin
- Hanyu Pinyin: Liú Wànlóng

Liu Wanlong (Chinese: 刘万龙; born July 1962) is a lieutenant general in the People's Liberation Army of China. He is a member of the 19th Central Committee of the Chinese Communist Party.

== Biography ==
Liu was born in Dongchangfu District, Liaocheng, Shandong, in July 1962. He was commander of Ali Military District in February 2008 and deputy commander of Nanjiang Military District (or Southern Xinjiang Military District) in 2011, both under the Xinjiang Military Region. He became head of the Military Department of Xinjiang Production and Construction Corps in 2013. On 17 March 2014, he was appointed commander of Gansu Military District of the Lanzhou Military Region, succeeding Chen Zhishu amid the anti-corruption campaign of Xi Jinping (the announcement being made by Li Changcai, the political commissar of Lanzhou).

In June 2016, Liu was admitted to member of the Standing Committee of the CCP Gansu Provincial Committee, the province's top authority. He became commander of Xinjiang Military District in January 2017, and served until April 2021 with the 2020–2021 China–India skirmishes ongoing. He was succeeded by Wang Haijiang as the commander of the Xinjiang Military District.

He was promoted to the rank of major general (shaojiang) in December 2012 and lieutenant general (zhongjiang) in July 2018.

Military offices
Preceded by Gao Longfu	Head of the Military Department of Xinjiang Production and Construction Corps; 2013–2014	Succeeded by Yang Hongli
Preceded by Chen Zhishu	Commander of Gansu Military District; 2014–2017	Succeeded by Wang Wenqing
Preceded by Peng Yong	Commander of Xinjiang Military District; 2017–2021	Succeeded by Wang Haijiang
