= 18th Corps (People's Republic of China) =

Former Chinese military unit

18th Corps (1949-50)
- Active: February 1949-1950
- Country: People's Republic of China
- Allegiance: Chinese Communist Party
- Part of: People's Liberation Army Ground Force
- Garrison/HQ: Lhasa, Tibet
- Engagements: Chinese Civil War

The 18th Corps (Chinese: 第18军) was a military formation of the Chinese People's Liberation Army which existed from 1949 to 1950.

The 18th Corps was activated in February 1949, and initially comprised the 52nd, 53rd and 54th Divisions. It was established at Henan Luyi County Wutai Temple on 18 February 1949.

On January 6, 1950, the 18th CPC Central Committee and the Southwest Military Region ordered the 18th Army to enter Tibet, under the cooperation of the 14th Army and the Northwest Military Region.

In December 1951, the CPC Central Committee and Central Military Commission decided to establish the Tibet Military Region. The district was established in Lhasa on February 10, 1952, and on 17 March 1952 the 18th Corps was disbanded.
