= Diao Guoxin =

Chinese general

- 刁国新

Political Commissar of the Tibet Military District
- In office December 2012 – August 2016
- Commander: Xu Yong
- Preceded by: Wang Zengbo
- Succeeded by: Wang Jianwu

Personal details
- Born: October 1958 (age 67) Taixing, Jiangsu, China
- Party: Chinese Communist Party

Military service
- Allegiance: China
- Branch/service: People's Liberation Army
- Years of service: 1976 − present
- Rank: Lieutenant general
- Battles/wars: Sino-Vietnamese War (1979); Battle of Koulinshan (1981); Battle of Laoshan (1984)

Diao Guoxin (Chinese: 刁国新; born October 1958) is a lieutenant general (zhong jiang) of the People's Liberation Army (PLA) of China. He served as Political Commissar of the Tibet Military District from 2012 to 2016.

== Biography ==
Diao Guoxin was born in October 1958 in Taixing, Jiangsu Province. He enlisted in the PLA in February 1976, and joined the Chinese Communist Party in March 1979. He is a university graduate.

In February 1979, Diao was transferred from the Nanjing Military Region to the 14th Group Army, and fought in the Sino-Vietnamese War. He also fought in the Battle of Koulinshan in May 1981 and the Battle of Laoshan in April 1984, during the subsequent Sino-Vietnamese conflicts. He was twice awarded for military valor.

Diao rose through the ranks of the 14th Group Army, eventually rising to political commissar of the corps in July 2007. In February 2011 he became political commissar of the 13th Group Army.

Diao was appointed political commissar of the Tibet Military District in December 2012. On 15 July 2014, he was promoted to the rank of lieutenant general (zhong jiang) together with Xu Yong, commander of the Tibet MD.

In August 2016, Diao Guoxin was appointed deputy political commissar of the People's Liberation Army Ground Force, newly established.
