= Liu Lin =

Liu Lin, may refer to:

- Liu Lin (rower) (born 1977), a Chinese rower.
- Liu Lin (general), a lieutenant general of the People's Liberation Army (PLA) who served as commander of the Xinjiang Military District in 2021.
