= Wang Haijiang =

Chinese general

- 汪海江

Commander of Western Theater Command
- In office August 2021 – October 2026
- Preceded by: Xu Qiling

Commander of Xinjiang Military District
- In office March 2021 – August 2021
- Preceded by: Liu Wanlong
- Succeeded by: Liu Lin

Commander of Tibet Military District
- In office December 2019 – March 2021
- Preceded by: Xu Yong
- Succeeded by: Wang Kai

Personal details
- Born: July 1963 (age 63) Anyue County, Sichuan, China
- Party: Chinese Communist Party (expelled in 2026)

Military service
- Allegiance: People's Republic of China
- Branch/service: People's Liberation Army Ground Force
- Rank: General

Wang Haijiang (Chinese: 汪海江; pinyin: Wāng Hǎijiāng; born July 1963) is a general (Shangjiang) of the People's Liberation Army (PLA). He served as commander of Western Theater Command. He previously served as commander of Xinjiang Military District, and commander of Tibet Military District from 2016 to 2018. In 2026, Wang was expelled from the Chinese Communist Party.

== Biography ==
Wang was born in Anyue County, Sichuan in July 1963. Wang participated in the Sino-Vietnamese conflicts (1979–1991) and won first class merit. After war, he became secretary of Li Qianyuan, former commander of Lanzhou Military Region. He served in the 76th Group Army since 1997. In January 2013 he was promoted to become deputy commander of Nanjiang Military District, a position he held until 2016, when he was appointed deputy commander of Tibet Military District. In December 2019, he rose to become commander there. In March 2021, he was transferred to northwest China's Xinjiang and appointed commander of Xinjiang Military District, he remained in that position until August 2021, when he was elevated to commander of Western Theater Command during the 2020–2021 China–India skirmishes.

On December 10, 2019, he was awarded the military rank of lieutenant general (zhongjiang) by Central Military Commission chairman Xi Jinping. On 6 September 2021, he was awarded the military rank of general (shangjiang) by Xi Jinping.

He was a delegate to the 13th National People's Congress.

On 29 October 2026, the fifth plenary session of the 20th CCP Central Committee reviewed and approved the report of the Discipline Inspection Commission of the Central Military Commission on the "serious violations of discipline and law" by Wang and confirmed the Politburo decision to expel him from the CCP.

Military offices
| Preceded by Xu Yong | Commander of Tibet Military District; 2019–2021 | Succeeded by Wang Kai |
| Preceded by Liu Wanlong | Commander of Xinjiang Military District; 2021–2021 | Succeeded by Liu Lin |
| Preceded by Xu Qiling | Commander of Western Theater Command; 2021–2026 | Incumbent |
