= Nanjiang Military District =

- 中国人民解放军南疆军区
- Founded: 1946; 79 years ago
- Country: People's Republic of China
- Allegiance: Chinese Communist Party
- Type: Military district
- Role: Command and control
- Part of: People's Liberation Army
- Headquarters: Kashgar, Xinjiang

Chinese name
- Simplified Chinese: 中国人民解放军南疆军区
- Traditional Chinese: 中國人民解放軍南疆軍區
Transcriptions
Standard Mandarin
- Hanyu Pinyin: Zhōngguó Rénmín Jiěfàngjūn Nánjiāngshěng Jūnqū

The Nanjiang Military District (Chinese: 中国人民解放军南疆军区; full name People's Liberation Army Nanjiang Military District or PLA Nanjiang Military District) is a military district of the National Defense Mobilization Department of the Central Military Commission in China.

== History ==
The Nanjiang Military District traces its origins to the former Second Corps of the Northwest Field Army, founded in November 1946 and would later become the Second Army of the People's Liberation Army on 1 February 1949. On 1 May 1950, the founding ceremony of the Chinese Communist Party Kashgar District Committee and Kashgar Military District was held simultaneously in Kashgar. On 26 October 1951, the People's Revolutionary Military Commission of the Central People's Government ordered that the Kashgar Military District of the Xinjiang Military District be renamed as the Nanjiang Military District.

On 14 June 1985, under the order of the Central Military Commission, the Nanjiang Military District was abolished during the Million Dollar Disarmament. In September 1987, the Xinjiang Military District reorganized the Nanjiang Military Region.

== Leaders ==
=== Commanders ===
Name (English)	Name (Chinese)	Tenure begins	Tenure ends	Note
Guo Peng	郭鹏	June 1949	November 1956	
Zeng Guangming	曾光明	November 1957	July 1962	
He Jiachan	何家产	July 1962	June 1964	
Liu Faxiu	刘发秀	July 1964	October 1969	
Zheng Zhiwen	郑志文	October 1969	July 1978	
Li Shuangsheng	李双盛	May 1978	May 1983	
Gao Huanchang	高焕昌	May 1983	October 1985	
Duan Changjin	段长金	November 1987	June 1990	
Wang Lizhong	王立忠	June 1990	October 1992	
Lin Wencai	林才文	November 1992	December 1994	
Qiu Yanhan	邱衍汉	July 1997	July 1999	
Li Xinguang	李新光	July 1999	December 2000	
Zhu Jinlin	朱锦林	December 2000	December 2007	
Guo Jingzhou	郭景洲	February 2008	October 2011	
Zhang Jiansheng	张建胜	November 2011	December 2013	
Li Haiyang	李海洋	November 2013	December 2019	
Liu Lin	柳林	March 2019	August 2021	

=== Political commissars ===
Name (English)	Name (Chinese)	Tenure begins	Tenure ends	Note
Wang Enmao	王恩茂	June 1949	February 1954	
Zuo Qi	左齐	December 1954	August 1956	
Zhu Jiasheng	朱家胜	January 1958	August 1960	
Ma Hongshan	马洪山	August 1960	July 1962	
Zeng Guangming	曾光明	July 1962	January 1969	
Ma Hongshan	马洪山	July 1962	November 1980	Second Political Commissar
Huang Ruixiang	黄瑞祥	July 1969	June 1981	
Wang Guangzeng	王光增	June 1981	April 1983	
Tang Guangcai	唐广才	May 1983	July 1985	
Qi Yuxuan	靳玉轩	October 1987	June 1990	
Lü Chunhe	吕春禾	June 1990	February 1993	
Qu Quansheng	屈全绳	March 1993	July 1995	
Kong Ying	孔瑛	July 1995	November 1997	
Wang Zhenxi	王振西	December 2000	December 2003	
Huang Jianguo	黄建国	December 2003	July 2008	
Lin Miaoxin	林淼鑫	October 2008	September 2012	
Li Wei	李伟	October 2012	June 2013	
Miao Wenjiang	缪文江	September 2013	April 2019	

=== Chiefs of Staff ===
Name (English)	Name (Chinese)	Tenure begins	Tenure ends	Note
He Shenggui	贺盛桂	June 1949	April 1953	
Ma Sen	马森	June 1953	August 1955	
Zheng Zhiwen	郑志文	May 1956	June 1960	
Tang Mo	唐谟	July 1960	June 1964	
Lian Chengxian	连承先	June 1964	May 1970	
Li Jingong	李进攻	May 1970	June 1978	
Yu Fugong	蔚福恭	June 1978	February 1981	
Zhang Zhentang	张振堂	March 1981	October 1985	
Zhang Zhentang	张振堂	September 1987	June 1990	
Chen Delin	陈德林	June 1990	February 1993	
Li Xinguang	李新光	February 1993	July 1997	
Li Yunsheng	李云生	July 1997	December 1999	
Peng Xinguo	彭新国	December 1999	December 2000	
Huang Chengzhou	黄呈洲			
Wang Wei	王伟		2007	
Zhang Jiansheng	张建胜	2007	2009	
Li Haiyang	李海洋	December 2009	July 2010	
Li Fayi	李发义	2010	November 2012	
Li Haiyang	李海洋	November 2012	March 2014	
Liu Lin	柳林	2014	2015	
Hu Jianlin	胡建林	2015		
