= Campaign along the Southern Section of Datong–Puzhou Railway =

1946 military campaign

Campaign along the Southern Section of the Datong-Puzhou Railway
- Part of Chinese Civil War
Date	July 12, 1946 – September 1, 1946
Location	Southern Shanxi, China
Result	Communist victory

Belligerents
Flag of the National Revolutionary Army National Revolutionary Army	PLA People's Liberation Army

Commanders and leaders
Hu Zongnan; Yan Xishan	Chen Geng; Xie Fuzhi

Strength
27,000	30,000

Casualties and losses
15,000	Unknown

Campaign along the Southern Section of the Datong-Puzhou Railway (Chinese: 同蒲路南段战役) was a campaign fought between the nationalists and the communists during the Chinese Civil War in the post-World War II era and resulted in the communist victory.

== Prelude ==
In early July 1946, Hu Zongnan (Chinese: 胡宗南), the nationalist commander-in-chief of the 1st War Zone sent the nationalist Reorganized 1st Division and the Reorganized 27th Division northward to link up with the nationalist force from Linfen and Jiexiu (介休) under the command of Yan Xishan, the nationalist commander-in-chief of the 2nd War Zone, hoping that the nationalist would dislodge the communists controlling the southern section of the Datong-Puzhou Railway. The communists under the command of Chen Geng and his political commissar Xie Fuzhi in turn, planned to annihilate the nationalists before they could link up with each other. The communist 4th Column of the Shanxi-Hebei-Shandong-Henan (晋冀鲁豫) Military Region was tasked with this job with the help of units of the communist Taiyue (太岳) Military Region.

== Order of battle ==
Nationalists:

- Reorganized 1st Division
- Reorganized 27th Division
- The 39th Division
- The 69th Division

Communists:

- The 4th Column of the Shanxi-Hebei-Shandong-Henan Military Region
- Units of the communist Taiyue (太岳) Military Region

== Campaign ==
On June 12, 1946, the nationalist Reorganized 27th Division and two brigades of the nationalist Reorganized 1st Division had pushed to Wenxi (闻喜), Water Head Town (Shui Tou Zhen, 水头镇), Embankment Palm Town (Yan Zhang Zhen, 堰掌镇), and Summer (Xia, 夏) County, and the nationalist advance guard had penetrated over 70km into the communist dominated areas. On July 13, 1946, the communist 4th Column of the Shanxi-Hebei-Shandong-Henan Military Region concentrated two brigades to besiege the 31st Brigade of the nationalist Reorganized 27th Division, while the rest of the troops were deployed to stop the nationalist reinforcement. By July 14, 1946, the 31st Brigade of the nationalist Reorganized 27th Division was completely annihilated at Embankment Palm Town (Yan Zhang Zhen, 堰掌镇) and the Town of Hu and Zhang (Hu Zhang Zhen, 胡张镇) regions. In the meantime, the nationalist reinforcement of the nationalist Reorganized 1st Division from Wenxi (闻喜) and Water Head Town (Shui Tou Zhen, 水头镇) to reinforce their besieged comrades-in-arms was also ambushed on its way and was forced to retreat.

After suffering the defeat, the nationalist force under the command of Hu Zongnan was forced out of action and had to regroup by withdrawing to the Wenxi (闻喜), Xia County, Shanxi and Anyi (安邑) regions. However, the nationalist force under the command of Yan Xishan was still on the move to the north in order to reinforce the nationalists in northern Shanxi participating in the Northern Shanxi Campaign. As the majority of the nationalist force was sent to the north, the regions along the Datong–Puzhou Railway from Lingshi (灵石) to Hongtong was only defended by the nationalist 39th Division, 69th Division, and local security regiments. Taking the opportunity, the communist 4th Column of the Shanxi-Hebei-Shandong-Henan Military Region and units of the communist Taiyue (太岳) Military Region joined their forces and launched another round of assaults on August 9, 1946, taking Hongtong, City of Zhao (Zhao Cheng, 赵城), Huo (霍) County, Lingshi (灵石) and Fenxi (汾西). The campaign finally concluded on September 1, 1946, when the communists took the region of Wealthy Family's Beach (Fu Jia Tan, 富家滩).

== Outcome ==
The nationalists had suffered over 15,000 casualties in their defeat, and not only they had failed to achieve their original objective of linking up with their comrades-in-arms, but the original gap in the nationalist defense had greatly increased as the result of the defeat. In contrast, the communist victory had completely severed the link between the nationalist force under the command of Hu Zongnan in the south and the nationalist force under the command of Yan Xishan in the north. The original gap between the two groups of the nationalist forces was greatly increased that there was no chance for the nationalists to link up again because a vast area along the 100 km southern section of the Datong-Puzhou Railway had fallen into communist hands.

== See also ==
- Outline of the Chinese Civil War
- National Revolutionary Army
- History of the People's Liberation Army
- Chinese Civil War
