= Yang Jinshan =

Chinese general and politician

- 杨金山

Commander of the Tibet Military District
- In office December 2009 – July 2013
- Preceded by: Shu Yutai (舒玉泰)
- Succeeded by: Xu Yong

Personal details
- Born: August 1954 (age 71) Xi County, Henan, China

Military service
- Allegiance: People's Republic of China
- Branch/service: People's Liberation Army
- Years of service: November 1969 – October 2014
- Rank: Lieutenant general
- Unit: 14th Group Army
- Commands: Commander of Tibet Military District (2009–2013); Deputy Commander of Chengdu Military Region (2013–2014)

Yang Jinshan
- Traditional Chinese: 楊金山
- Simplified Chinese: 杨金山
Transcriptions
Standard Mandarin
- Hanyu Pinyin: Yáng Jīnshān

Yang Jinshan (Chinese: 杨金山; born 1954) is a disgraced general in the People's Liberation Army of China. He served as the Deputy Commander of Chengdu Military Region between July 2013 to October 2014, and Commander of Tibet Military District from December 2009 to July 2013. Yang is a former member of 18th Central Committee of the Chinese Communist Party, but was expelled from the body in 2014.

Yang was promoted to the rank of major general (shao jiang) in December 2005 and lieutenant general (zhong jiang) in July 2011. Chinese media reported that Yang had close relations with Xu Caihou, who is the former Vice Chairman of the Central Military Commission and General of the Chinese People's Liberation Army.

== Career ==
Yang was born in Chengguan Town, Xi County, Henan province in August 1954. He graduated from PLA National Defence University. Yang joined the People's Liberation Army in November 1969 and joined the Chinese Communist Party in May 1972.

Beginning in 1969, Yang served in several posts in the 14th Group Army, including soldier, monitor, staff, battalion commander, and Chief of staff. From August 1995 to January 2001, he served as Director of Combat Department of Chengdu Military Region. Then he served as the Chief of staff of the 14th Group Army. He became the Deputy Chief of Staff of Chengdu MR in November 2005, and served until July 2007, when he was appointed Director of Armament Department of Chengdu MR. In December 2009, he was promoted to become Commander of Tibet Military District, he remained in that position until July 2013, when he was appointed Deputy Commander of the Chengdu MR.

Sometime in 2014, Yang was investigated by the Discipline Inspection Commission of the Central Military Commission, the military's top anti-graft body. The details of the investigation were not released, as is common practice with military graft cases. In October 2014, Yang was expelled from the Communist Party at the Fourth Plenary Session of the 18th Central Committee of the Chinese Communist Party and ejected from the Communist Party's Central Committee. Official sources did not state the reasons for his expulsion, though Chinese-language media have speculated about his links to the corruption cases of Gu Junshan and Xu Caihou.
