= Datong–Puzhou campaign =

1946 military campaign

- Part of Chinese Civil War
Date	August 14, 1946 – September 1, 1946
Location	Shanxi, China
Result	Communist victory

Belligerents
National Revolutionary Army	People's Liberation Army

Commanders and leaders
Yan Xishan	Chen Geng

Strength
20,000	20,000

Casualties and losses
10,000+	Unknown

Datong–Puzhou campaign (同蒲战役) was a campaign that communists fought against the nationalist during the Chinese Civil War in the post-World War II era in Shanxi, and resulted in communist victory.

== Order of battle ==
Nationalist:

- The 34th Army

Communist:

- 4th Column of Shanxi-Hebei-Shandong-Henan Field army

== Campaign ==
In early July, 1946, nationalist commander-in-chief of the 2nd War Zone, Yan Xishan, ordered the nationalist 34th Army under his command to attack communists from Jiexiu (介休) to help Hu Zongnan's attacks on the communists. The nationalists planned to annihilate their communist enemy in the regions of Hongdong and Zhao (赵) City in southern Shanxi. However, Hu Zongnan, the nationalist commander-in-chief of the 1st War Zone was soundly defeated by the communists in the Wenxi–Xiaxian campaign by late July, 1946, and was forced to retreated to Yuncheng and Wenxi (闻喜) regions to regroup and thus could not support Yan Xishan's effort. Communists accordingly launched their Northern Shanxi campaign to further expand their victory.

In order to reinforce nationalists in northern Shanxi, Yan Xishan had to redeploy his troops from southern Shanxi, which provided the excellent opportunity for the enemy to strike in the vast region from Lingshi (灵石) to Hongdong along the Datong-Puzhou Railway. The communist commanders were quick to seize the opportunity, and struck on August 14, 1946, after marching from Jiang (绛) county and Quwo (曲沃) county in secret on August 9 and August 10 respectively. The campaign progressed exactly as communists had planned and ended in their predicated victory. In addition to annihilating more than 10,000 nationalist troops, the victorious communists also succeeded in taking counties / towns including Hongdong on August 16 (killing more than a thousand nationalist troops in the process), Zhao (赵) City on August 17 (killing more than three thousands nationalist troops in the process), Huo (霍) county on August 24, Lingshi (灵石) on August 28, and Fenxi (汾西) on August 29. The communists ended the campaign on September 1, 1946, when they took Wealthy Family's Beach (Fu Jia Tan, 富家滩).

As a result of the defeat, over 130 km stretch of area along the southern section of Datong-Puzhou Railway had fallen into the enemy hands, resulting the linkage between Yan Xishan's 2nd War Zone and Hu Zongnan's 1st War Zone was completely severed, thus making future operations more difficult. Five important local cities / towns were lost to the communists, where they would obtain plenty of supplies. Nationalists were also forced to be on the defensive for sometime after Datong–Puzhou campaign, while communists took the opportunity to consolidate their gains.

== See also ==
- Outline of the Chinese Civil War
- National Revolutionary Army
- History of the People's Liberation Army
- Chinese Civil War
