= 54th Division (People's Republic of China) =

54th Division (1949–55)
- Active: 1949.2 - 1955.6
- Country: People's Republic of China
- Branch: People's Liberation Army
- Type: Division
- Role: Infantry
- Part of: 18th Corps
- Engagements: Chinese Civil War, Liberation of Tibet

The 54th Division (Chinese: 第54师) was activated in February 1949 under the Regulation of the Redesignations of All Organizations and Units of the Army, issued by Central Military Commission on November 1, 1948, from three independent regiments of Yuwansu Military District.

The division was a part of 18th Corps. Under the flag of 54th the division took part in the Chinese Civil War, including the Huaihai Campaign. In 1951 the division entered Tibet along with the Corps. Several detachments from the division took part in the Battle of Chamdo.

The division was then composed of:

- 172nd Infantry Regiment.
- 173rd Infantry Regiment.
- 174th Infantry Regiment.

In June 1955, the division was transferred out of Tibet and moved to Wuhan to form 1st Antiaircraft Artillery Division of Air Defense Force.
