= Dong Guishan =

Chinese general

- 董贵山

Commander of the Tibet Military District
- In office November 2004 – July 2008
- Preceded by: Meng Jinxi
- Succeeded by: Shu Yutai

Personal details
- Born: July 1946 (age 80) Xiping County, Henan, China
- Party: Chinese Communist Party
- Education: PLA Military Direction Academy

Military service
- Allegiance: People's Republic of China
- Branch/service: People's Liberation Army Ground Force
- Years of service: 1964–2008
- Rank: Lieutenant general

Chinese name
- Simplified Chinese: 董贵山
- Traditional Chinese: 董貴山
Transcriptions
Standard Mandarin
- Hanyu Pinyin: Dǒng Guìshān

Dong Guishan (Chinese: 董贵山; born July 1946) is a retired lieutenant general in the People's Liberation Army (PLA) of the People's Republic of China, who served as commander of the PLA Tibet Military District from 2004 to 2008.

== Biography ==
Born in Xiping County, Henan Province, Dong joined the People's Liberation Army (PLA) in December 1964, and the Chinese Communist Party (CCP) in January 1966. He has served in various posts in Tibet Military District during his career, and was elevated to vice chief of staff of the region in June 1988. In November 1991, he received a promotion to deputy commander of the area. He studied at the Nanjing Military Academy in January 1982, and at the PLA Military Direction Academy from September 1984 to July 1986. In October 1998, he became the director of the Armament Department of the PLA Chengdu Military Region. In August 2004, he was appointed commander of the Tibet Military District. From November 2004 to October 2006 he was also a standing committee member of the CCP Tibet Autonomous Regional Committee. He became a lieutenant general in July 2006.

He was a member of the 17th Central Committee of the Chinese Communist Party.

Military offices
Preceded by Meng Jinxi	Commander of the Tibet Military District; 2004–2008	Succeeded by Shu Yutai
