= 53rd Mountain Motorized Infantry Brigade =

Brigade of the People's Liberation Army

53rd Army Division (1968-85) 53rd Mountain Motorized Infantry Brigade (1985-2017) 53rd Mountain Combined Arms Brigade (2017-)
- Active: 1968 - Present
- Country: China
- Allegiance: Chinese Communist Party
- Branch: People's Liberation Army Ground Force
- Type: Mountain troops
- Size: Brigade
- Part of: Tibet Military District
- Garrison/HQ: Nyingchi, Tibet

The 53rd Army Division (Chinese: 陆军第53师) was formed on February 15, 1968, from Tibet Unit 843, and 153rd, 4th and 3rd Regiment of Tibet Military District. At its formation the division was composed of:

- 157th Infantry Regiment (former 153rd);
- 158th Infantry Regiment (former 4th);
- 159th Infantry Regiment (former 3rd);
- 310th Artillery Regiment.

The division has been stationed in Nyingchi, Tibet since its formation.

In December 1969 its 310th Artillery Regiment was renamed as Artillery Regiment, 53rd Army Division.

On September 24, 1985, the division was reduced and renamed as the 53rd Mountain Motorized Infantry Brigade (Chinese: 山地摩托化步兵第53旅), a Motorized Infantry Brigade of High Altitude.

In 2017 the brigade was re-organized as the 53rd Mountain Combined Arms Brigade (Chinese: 山地合成第53旅).
