= Meng Jinxi =

Chinese general and politician

- 蒙进喜

Commander of the Tibet Military District
- In office September 1996 – August 2004
- Preceded by: Zhou Wenbi
- Succeeded by: Dong Guishan

Personal details
- Born: September 1944 (age 82) Chongqing, China
- Party: Chinese Communist Party
- Education: Chongqing Jianshan High School; PLA Military Academy

Military service
- Allegiance: People's Republic of China
- Branch/service: People's Liberation Army Ground Force
- Years of service: 1961–2007
- Rank: Lieutenant general
- Unit: 94th Regiment of the 32nd Division
- Battles/wars: Sino-Vietnamese War

Chinese name
- Simplified Chinese: 蒙进喜
- Traditional Chinese: 蒙進喜
Transcriptions
Standard Mandarin
- Hanyu Pinyin: Méng Jìnxǐ

Meng Jinxi (Chinese: 蒙进喜; born September 1944) is a lieutenant general in the People's Liberation Army of China who served as commander of the Tibet Military District from 1996 to 2004. He was a member of the 16th Central Committee of the Chinese Communist Party. He was a delegate to the 9th National People's Congress. He was a member of the Standing Committee of the 11th Chinese People's Political Consultative Conference.

== Biography ==
Meng was born in Chongqing, in September 1944. He secondary studied at Chongqing Jianshan High School (重庆市兼善中学) and graduated from the PLA Military Academy.

He enlisted in the People's Liberation Army (PLA) in September 1961, and joined the Chinese Communist Party (CCP) in November 1964. He served in the Kunming Military District from July 1964 to November 1969 and the 94th Regiment of the 32nd Division of the PLA Ground Force from November 1969 to September 1980. He led the regiment to fame in the Sino-Vietnamese War.

He was commander of the 14th Group Army in September 1985, and held that office until September 1988. He became vice president of the PLA Kunming Army College in July 1989, concurrently serving as head of the Training Department. He became deputy commander of the Guizhou Military District in August 1992, and served until June 1996, when he was promoted to become commander of the Tibet Military District. In June 2000, he was admitted to member of the Standing Committee of the CCP Tibet Autonomous Regional Committee, the region's top authority. He took up the post of deputy commander of the Chengdu Military Region which he held from July 2001 to December 2007, although he remained commander of the Tibet Military District until September 2004.

He was promoted to the rank of major general (shaojiang) in September 1988 and lieutenant general (zhongjiang) in July 2002.

Military offices
Preceded by He Qizong	Commander of the 14th Group Army; 1985–1988	Succeeded by Wang Zuxun
Preceded by Zhou Wenbi	Commander of the Tibet Military District; 1996–2004	Succeeded by Dong Guishan
