= 149th Motorized Infantry Division =

Brigade of the People's Liberation Army

52nd Army Division (1965-69) 149th Army Division (1969-85) 149th Motorized Infantry Division (1985-2017) 149th Medium Combined Arms Brigade (2017-)
- Active: 1965.5 -
- Country: People's Republic of China
- Branch: People's Liberation Army Ground Force
- Type: Combined Arms
- Size: Brigade
- Part of: 76th Group Army (149th Brigade); 77th Group Army (150th Brigade)
- Garrison/HQ: Leshan, Sichuan
- Engagements: Sino-Indian War, Sino-Vietnamese War

The 52nd Army Division (Chinese: 陆军第52师) was activated in May 1965 from the Tibet Unit 419 (Chinese: 藏字419部队).

The division was composed of:

- 154th Infantry Regiment;
- 155th Infantry Regiment;
- 156th Infantry Regiment;
- 309th Artillery Regiment.

In August 1969, the division swapped its designations and positions with the 149th Army Division from the 50th Army Corps, and became the 149th Army Division (Chinese: 陆军第149师)(2nd Formation). All its regiments were re-designated as the 445th, 446th and 447th Infantry Regiments. Its 309th Artillery Regiment was renamed as Artillery Regiment, 149th Army Division.

The division then stationed in Leshan, Sichuan province and attached to the 50th Army Corps.

From February to March 1979 the division took part in the Sino-Vietnamese War. During the war the division inflicted heavy losses to the confronting PAVN 316A Division, eliminating a total of 2338 Vietnamese combatants.

In 1985 the division was renamed as the 149th Motorized Infantry Division (Chinese: 摩托化步兵第149师) as a southern motorized infantry division. The division attached to 13th Army following 50th Army Corps' disbandment.

By then the division was composed of:

- 445th Infantry Regiment;
- 446th Infantry Regiment;
- 447th Infantry Regiment;
- Artillery Regiment;
- Anti-Aircraft Artillery Regiment (former AAA Regiment, 50th Army Corps).

In 1989 the division took part in the forced martial law in Lhasa.

In 1998 the 447th Infantry Regiment merged with the Mechanized Infantry Regiment, 3rd Tank Division as the Armored Regiment, 149th Motorized Infantry Division. Since then the division was composed of:

- 445th Infantry Regiment;
- 446th Infantry Regiment;
- Armored Regiment;
- Artillery Regiment;
- Anti-Aircraft Regiment.

In April 2017 the division was split into two brigades: the 149th Medium Combined Arms Brigade (Chinese: 中型合成第149旅) and the 150th Light Combined Arms Brigade (Chinese: 轻型合成第150旅).
