= Houma Campaign =

1946 military campaign

- Part of the Chinese Civil War
Date	January 19, 1946 – January 22, 1946
Location	Shanxi, China
Result	Communist victory

Belligerents
Flag of the National Revolutionary Army National Revolutionary Army	PLA Chinese Red Army

Commanders and leaders
Wang Jingguo; Gao Zhuozhi	Chen Geng

Strength
20,000	6,500

Casualties and losses
6,500	Low

The Houma Campaign (侯马战役) or Houma Counteroffensive (侯马反击战) was a series of battles fought between the nationalists and the communists during Chinese Civil War in the post World War II era, and resulted in the communist victory.

== Order of battle ==
Nationalist order of battle:

- 13th Army Group commanded by Wang Jingguo (王靖国)
  - 34th Army commanded by Gao Zhuozhi (高卓之)

Communist order of battle:

- Three brigades of the fourth Column (commanded by Chen Geng) of the Shanxi – Hebei – Shandong – Henan Military Region

== Campaign ==
On 19 January 1946, Yan Xishan ordered his 13th Army Group to deploy its 34th Army from Linfen, and to strike southward along the Tatong-Puzhou Railway. Yan believed that the communists would let their guard down due to the truce signed by Chiang Kai-shek and Mao Zedong in Chongqing on 10 January 1946, and his surprise attack would eradicate communist in his targeted regions. On 21 January 1946, the nationalists succeeded in taking regions to the west of Houma, including Eastern Height Hamlet (Donggaocun, 东高村), Western Height Hamlet (Xigaocun, 西高村), and Horse Village (Mazhuang, 马庄). The nationalists planned to carry out their next goal by driving the enemy into the region to the east of Quwo (曲沃), thus securing the southern section of Tatong-Puzhou Railway. However, the nationalist force was thinly spread when they were dispersed to guard the newly conquered territory, and this weakness was immediately captured and exploited by the enemy.

In the evening of 22 January 1946, Chen Geng concentrated three brigades of the communist 4th Column and launched a surprise attack on the unsuspecting nationalists, who were completely caught off guard. Within a short period of several hours, the nationalist lost an entire division, with over three thousand troops captured by the enemy, including the commander of the 45th Division. After repeated nationalist attacks were beaten back by the stubborn enemy, Yan Xishan was forced to accept defeat by ordering Wang Jingguo to sign a truce with Chen Geng, and the condition prior to the campaign was restored. The biggest winner of the campaign, however, was neither Yan Xishan nor the communists, but Chiang Kai-shek instead. The reason was that no matter who had won, the outcome always benefited Chiang's central government: if Yan had won, the communists would be weakened, and when the communists won, warlord was weakened, and since Chiang's troops were not involved, there was no political fallouts for breaking the truce for Chiang. The communist victory therefore had helped Chiang's central government to reduce the problem of warlords in weakening the local warlord in Shanxi.

== See also ==
- Outline of the Chinese Civil War
- National Revolutionary Army
- History of the People's Liberation Army
