= Xie Youfa =

- 谢有法
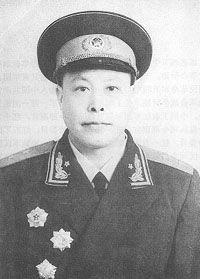
- Xie Youfa

Political Commissar of PLA Political College
- In office 1980–1983

Political Commissar of PLA Military Institute of Engineering
- In office 1 May 1958 – April 1966
- Preceded by: Chen Geng
- Succeeded by: Li Dongye

Personal details
- Born: April 16, 1917 Xingguo County, Jiangxi, China
- Died: January 9, 1995 (aged 77) Beijing, China
- Party: Chinese Communist Party
- Children: 2
- Education: Central Party School of the Chinese Communist Party

Military service
- Allegiance: People's Republic of China
- Branch/service: People's Liberation Army Ground Force
- Years of service: 1932–1986
- Rank: Lieutenant general
- Battles/wars: Long March; Second Sino-Japanese War; Chinese Civil War; Korean War
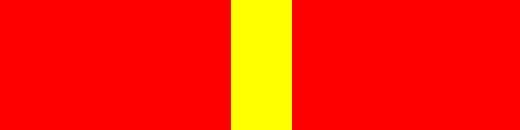
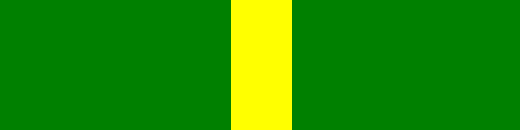
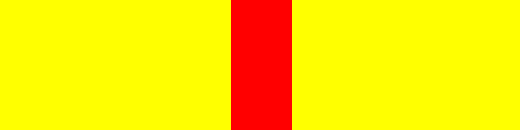
- Awards: Order of Bayi (Third Class Medal) Order of Independence and Freedom (Second Class Medal) Order of Liberation (First Class Medal); PLA Merit Medal (First Class Medal)

Chinese name
- Traditional Chinese: 謝有法
- Simplified Chinese: 谢有法
Transcriptions
Standard Mandarin
- Hanyu Pinyin: Xiè Yǒufǎ

Xie Youfa (Chinese: 谢有法; 16 April 1917 - 9 January 1995) was a lieutenant general in the People's Liberation Army (PLA).

== Biography ==
Xie was born in Xingguo County, Jiangxi on April 16, 1917. He joined the Communist Youth League of China in January 1932 and joined the Chinese Workers' and Peasants' Red Army in the following year. In 1934 he took part in the Long March. During the Second Sino-Japanese War, he fought against the Imperial Japanese Army in Shandong.

After the founding of the Communist State, he was present at the Second Phase Offensive and Chinese Spring Offensive between 1950 and 1951 during the Korean War. In 1955, at the age of 38, he was awarded the military rank of lieutenant general (zhongjiang) by Chairman Mao Zedong. That same year, he became deputy director of Organization Division of the People's Liberation Army General Political Department. In 1956 he was accepted to the Central Party School of the Chinese Communist Party. After graduation, he was appointed Political Commissar of PLA Military Institute of Engineering and Director of the Political Department of State Infrastructure Commission in 1958. In 1966 he was transferred to Shenyang Military Region and appointed Deputy Political Commissar. He was Political Commissar of PLA Political College in August 1980, and held that office until 1983, then he was its consultant, serving in the post until he retirement in 1986. On January 19, 1995, he died of an illness in Beijing, aged 77.

== Personal life ==
Xie had a son and a daughter.

Educational offices
Preceded by Chen Geng	Political Commissar of PLA Military Institute of Engineering; 1958–1966	Succeeded by Li Dongye (李东野)
