= Peng Yong =

- 彭勇

Commander of the Xinjiang Military District
- In office July 2011 – January 2017
- Preceded by: Zhu Jinlin
- Succeeded by: Liu Wanlong

Personal details
- Born: January 1954 (age 72) Lulong County, Hebei, China
- Party: Chinese Communist Party

Military service
- Allegiance: China
- Branch/service: People's Liberation Army
- Years of service: 1970 − present
- Rank: Lieutenant General

Peng Yong (Chinese: 彭勇; pinyin: Péng Yǒng; born January 1954) is a retired lieutenant general (zhong jiang) in the Chinese People's Liberation Army who served as commander of the Xinjiang Military District.

Originally from Lulong County, Hebei, Peng joined the military in 1970. He served in the 21st Group Army, then the 47th Group Army, before joining the Xinjiang Military District as its commander. He was promoted to lieutenant general in November 2012. He also served on the Xinjiang Autonomous Regional Standing Committee of the Communist Party, but was removed from the position as a result of the 2013 Tiananmen Square attack, thought to be perpetrated by Uyghurs from Xinjiang. He was replaced by Major General Liu Lei, political commissar of the Xinjiang Military District.

He was a member of the 18th Central Committee of the Chinese Communist Party.
