= Xu Yong (general) =

Chinese general (1959–2024)

- 许勇

Commander of the Tibet Military District
- In office July 2013 – December 2019
- Political commissar: Diao Guoxin
- Preceded by: Yang Jinshan
- Succeeded by: Wang Haijiang

Personal details
- Born: April 1959 Baoji, Shaanxi, China
- Died: 13 September 2024 (aged 65) Chengdu, Sichuan, China
- Party: Chinese Communist Party
- Education: PLA National Defence University

Military service
- Allegiance: China
- Branch/service: People's Liberation Army
- Years of service: ? −2024
- Rank: Lieutenant general
- Battles/wars: Sino-Vietnamese War

Xu Yong (Chinese: 许勇; April 1959 – 13 September 2024) was a lieutenant general (zhong jiang) of the People's Liberation Army, who was Commander of the Tibet Military District from 2013 to 2019.

== Biography ==
Xu Yong was born in 1959 in Baoji, Shaanxi Province. He held a master's degree from PLA National Defence University.

Xu began his career as a military scout, and fought in the Sino-Vietnamese War in 1979. He rose through the ranks to become battalion commander, division commander, corps-level chief of staff, and then commander of the 13th Group Army in 2008. He attained the rank of major general in 2007.

After the Great Sichuan earthquake occurred in May 2008, Xu was the first general to arrive at the epicenter Yingxiu with his soldiers to join the rescue mission. At the time, his 19-year-old son had just died of cancer a month before.

Xu Yong was appointed commander of the Tibet Military District in July 2013, replacing Yang Jinshan. On 15 July 2014, he was promoted to the rank of lieutenant general (zhong jiang) together with Diao Guoxin, the political commissar of the Tibet Military District.

Xu was a PLA member of the 12th National People's Congress.

Xu died in Chengdu, Sichuan on 13 September 2024, at the age of 65.
