= Lüliang Campaign =

1946 Chinese battles

Lüliang campaign
- Part of the Chinese Civil War
| Date | November 22, 1946 – January 1, 1947 |
| Location | Shanxi, China |
| Result | Communist victory |

Belligerents
| Flag of the National Revolutionary Army National Revolutionary Army | PLA Chinese Red Army |

Commanders and leaders
| Hu Zongnan; Yan Xishan | Wang Zhen; Chen Geng; Xie Fuzhi |

Strength
| 30,000 | 45,000 |

Casualties and losses
| 10,000+ | Unknown |

Lüliang campaign (吕梁战役), also called Southwestern Shanxi campaign (晋西南战役), was a series of battles fought between the nationalists and the communists in Lüliang region in southwestern Shanxi during the Chinese Civil War in the post World War II era, and resulted in the communist victory.

== Prelude ==
In early November 1946, Hu Zongnan, the commander-in-chief of the nationalist 1st War Zone in an attempt to concentrate nationalist force to attack the communist capital Yan'an, redeployed two nationalist reorganized divisions Shaanxi from southern Shanxi. Only two nationalist divisions were left for the local defense of southern Shanxi, and in Lüliang region with a total of ten counties, there was only one regiment of the nationalist 2nd War Zone, assisted by local security brigades totaling ten thousand. The communists decided to take this opportunity by taking the region and annihilating the nationalist garrison in the process.

== Order of battle ==
Defenders: nationalist order of battle:

- 4 Divisions
- Local Security Brigades

Attackers: communist order of battle:

- The 4th Column of the communist Shanxi – Henan – Hebei – Shandong Military District
- The 2nd Column of the communist Shanxi – Suiyuan Military District
- 8 regiments of the communist Taiyue (太岳) Military District, including the 24th Brigade

== Campaign ==
On November 22, 1946, the campaign begun as the communist unleashed their attacks. After a series of battles, the communists succeeded in taking nationalist strongholds including Daning (大宁), Forever Peace (Yonghe, 永 和), Pu (蒲) County, Stone Building (Shi Lou, 石楼), and heavily fortified towns Xi (隰) County and Middle Sun (Zhong Yang, 中阳). Majority of the local nationalist garrison totaling more than five thousand were captured alive by the enemy, including the nationalist commander-in-chief of the western Shanxi region of the 2nd War Zone, Yang Dengyuan (杨澄源), while the rest were killed. The rapid success of communist meant that a vast region bordered by the Yellow River in the west, the Datong – Pukou Railway in the east, Middle Sun (Zhong Yang, 中阳) in the north and the Ji (吉) County in the south had fallen into the enemy hands by December 12, 1946, and the rear of the nationalist units planned to attack Yan'an was gravely exposed, and thus seriously threatened by the enemy. The two nationalist reorganized divisions deployed from southern Shanxi to Shaanxi to attack Yan'an were forced to abandon their original objective and redeployed back to southern Shanxi, and Hu Zongnan was also forced to order another two divisions to attack Daning (大宁) and Pu (蒲) County from Linfen and Ji (吉) County in an attempt to retake the territory lost to the enemy.

Facing the nationalist counteroffensive, the communists formed a new command to better control all of the communist units in Lüliang region, and the three-men committee consisted of Chen Geng (陈赓), the commander-in-chief and Xie Fuzhi, the political commissar of the 4th Column of the communist Shanxi – Henan – Hebei – Shandong Military District, and Wang Zhen, the commander-in-chief of the 2nd Column of the communist Shanxi – Suiyuan Military District. The communists of the 4th Column decided to maximize the terrain advantage in their next move, since the local landscape was a great obstacle for deploying mechanized force for fast mobile warfare which the nationalists were good at. The communists planned to lure the enemy deeper into the hostile terrain and annihilate enemy one small portion at a time, and one communist brigade was sent out to penetrate deep behind the enemy line, successfully severed the nationalist supply line. Meanwhile, eight regiments of the communist Taiyue (太岳) Military District took Yuanqu (垣曲) and Flank City (Yi Cheng, 翼城) in a coordinated attack. Being attacked by the enemy from the front and rear, and as well as exhausting available supplies, the nationalists attacking Lüliang region were forced to withdraw. On December 30, 1946, the communist 4th Column annihilated the nationalist rear guard, the 67th Brigade on the highway from the town of Pu (蒲) County to Danning (大宁), and following the success, concluded the campaign by taking the town of Pu (蒲) County on January 1, 1947, badly mauling the nationalist defenders in the process.

== Outcome ==
The nationalists lost over 10,000 troops in this defeat, which disrupted the overall plan to attack the communist capital Yan'an, and the original offensive schedule had to be postponed, thus providing the enemy with ample time to evacuate. Furthermore, the southwestern Shanxi was constantly under the enemy threat as a result of the nationalist defeat. The lack of corporation among nationalists themselves was also an important contributor to the enemy's success: the local Shanxi nationalist warlord Yan Xishan was always fearful of Chiang Kai-shek's takeover and thus refused to send out any of his own troops for reinforcement under the excuse of local areas would be threatened if his troops were sent to southwestern Shanxi to help Hu Zongnan.

== See also ==
- Outline of the Chinese Civil War
- National Revolutionary Army
- History of the People's Liberation Army
