= Zuo Qi =

Chinese general

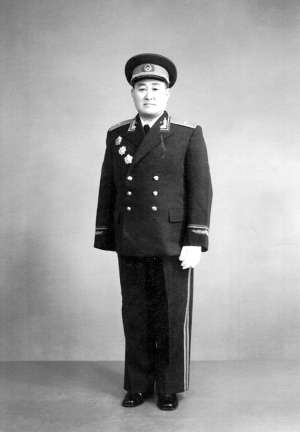
Full-length photo of Zuo Qi being awarded a rank in 1955

Zuo Qi (1911 – August 26, 1998) was one of the founding generals of the People's Liberation Army. He was born in Yongxin County, Jiangxi, China.

== Biography ==
In 1929, Zuo Qi joined the Communist Youth League of China. In 1932, he enlisted in the Chinese Red Army and joined the Chinese Communist Party in the same year. He participated in the Encirclement campaigns and the Long March. During the Long March, he served as the head of a regimental propaganda unit and once shot down a Kuomintang aircraft with a rifle.In 1938, he was appointed chief of staff of the 717th Regiment, 359th Brigade, 120th Division of the Eighth Route Army. In November of that year, he led his troops in an ambush against a Japanese supply convoy in the mountains behind Mingfu Village, Yu County, Shanxi (known as the Battle of Mingfu). During the fierce battle with Japanese forces, Zuo was shot in the upper part of his right arm. Despite the injury, he completed the ambush mission while holding his wound. Due to the severity of the wound, his right arm could not be saved, and Norman Bethune personally performed the amputation surgery. Zuo Qi continued to serve on the front lines and was appointed Political Commissar of the 718th Regiment of the 359th Brigade. In the spring of 1941, in response to the Kuomintang’s economic blockade of Yan'an, the Chinese Communist Party launched the Great Production Campaign. Zuo accompanied Commander-in-Chief Zhu De and technical staff to inspect Nanniwan, after which he led the 718th Regiment to the areas of Linzhen and Jinpenwan to begin agricultural reclamation.

Due to his disability, he was unable to participate in farming work, so he voluntarily took charge of cooking and logistics, which boosted troop morale. The 718th Regiment became known as the “Model Production Regiment.” Mao Zedong praised the regiment’s achievements and mentioned them again at the Yan'an conference in May 1943.

In November 1944, the 359th Brigade formed a Southward Detachment to move into southern China, and Zuo joined the campaign as Political Commissar of the Logistics Department of the detachment. During the Chinese Civil War, he served as Deputy Political Commissar and Commander of a sub-region in the Jinsui Military Region, and later as Director of the Political Department of the First Field Army’s Second Corps.

After the founding of the People's Republic of China, he accompanied Wang Zhen into Xinjiang, where he served as Deputy Political Commissar and later as Political Commissar of the Southern Xinjiang Military Region, and Deputy Political Commissar and Director of the Political Department of the Xinjiang Military District. He later became Deputy Political Commissar and then Senior Advisor of the Jinan Military Region.In 1955, he was awarded the military rank of Lieutenant General in the People's Liberation Army. His honors include the Second Class Order of Bayi, Second Class Order of Independence and Freedom, and First Class Order of Liberation. He died in Jinan on August 26, 1998, at the age of 87.
