= Tibet Military District =

Military district of China

- 中国人民解放军西藏军区
- Founded: 1 February 2016; 10 years ago
- Country: People's Republic of China
- Allegiance: Chinese Communist Party
- Type: Military District of the PLA
- Role: Command and control
- Part of: People's Liberation Army
- Headquarters: Tibet, Lhasa

Commanders
- Commander: Lieutenant General Wang Kai
- Political Commisar: Lieutenant General Yuan Honggang
- Chief of Staff: Major General Thupten Trinley (aka Tidan Dan)

The Tibet Military District is a military district of the People's Liberation Army Ground Force. It was first established in 1952, possibly from elements previously part of the 18th Corps. In December 1968 it became part of the Chengdu Military Region.

The former Tibet Military Region was reduced to the status of a district in 1971. In the 2016 reform, the Tibet Military District was raised to a direct-reporting sub-Theater grade command, partially bypassing the jurisdiction of the Western Theater Command.

== Subordinate Units ==
- 52nd Mountain Combined Arms Brigade (山地合成第52旅)
- 53rd Mountain Combined Arms Brigade (山地合成第53旅)
- 54th Heavy Combined Arms Brigade (重型合成第54旅)
- 85th Special Operation Brigade (特战第85旅)
- 85th Army Aviation Brigade (陆航第85旅)
- 85th Artillery Brigade (炮兵第85旅)
- 85th Air-Defense Brigade (防空第85旅)
- 85th Engineering and Chemical Brigade (工化第85旅)
- 7th Electronic Countermeasures Brigade (电子对抗第7旅)
- 5th Motorized Transport Brigade (汽车运输第五旅)
- Tibet Military Region Communication Regiment (西藏军区通信团)

=== Border Guard Units ===
- 351st Border Guard Regiment (边防第351团): Zayu County, Nyingchi Prefecture
- 352nd Border Guard Regiment (边防第352团): Medog County. Nyingchi Prefecture
- 353rd Border Guard Regiment (边防第353团): Mainling City, Nyingchi Prefecture
- 354th Border Guard Regiment (边防第354团): Lhunze County, Lhoka Prefecture
- 355th Border Guard Regiment (边防第355团): Cona County, Lhoka Prefecture
- 356th Border Guard Regiment (边防第356团): Yadong County, Shigatse Prefecture
- 357th Border Guard Regiment (边防第357团): Tingri County, Shigatse Prefecture
- 358th Border Guard Regiment (边防第358团) (MUCD 77646): Saga County, Shigatse Prefecture

The whole of Ngari Prefecture is under the jurisdiction of the Xinjiang Military District

== Commanders ==
1. Zhang Guohua, February 1952 - July 1968
2. Zeng Yongya, July 1968 - November 1970
3. Chen Mingyi, November 1970 - November 1973
4. Qie Jinwu, November 1973 - May 1978
5. Zhang Guirong, May 1978 - August 1983
6. Jiang Hongquan, August 1983 - September 1992
7. Zhou Wenbi, September 1992 - September 1996
8. Meng Jinxi, September 1996 - August 2004
9. Dong Guishan, August 2004 - July 2008
10. Shu Yutai, July 2008 - December 2009
11. Yang Jinshan, December 2009 - July 2013
12. Xu Yong, July 2013 - December 2019
13. Wang Haijiang, December 2019 - March 2021
14. Wang Kai, (Since March 2021)
