= 3rd Armored Brigade (People's Republic of China) =

Brigade of the People's Liberation Army

3rd Tank Division (1950–98) 3rd Armored Division (1998–2011) 3rd Armored Brigade (2011–17)
- Chinese: 战车第3师
- Active: 1950.10.8 - 2017.4 (inactive)
- Country: China
- Type: Armored
- Size: Brigade
- Part of: 39th Army before 2017
- Garrison/HQ: Siping, Jilin
- Engagements: Korean War; Laotian Civil War; Sino-Soviet border conflict

On October 8, 1950, the 3rd Tank Division(Chinese: 战车第3师) was formed in Siping, Jilin province from the 1st Independent Division, Northwestern Military Region.

By then, the division was composed of:

- 5th Tank Regiment;
- 6th Tank Regiment;
- Motorized Infantry Regiment;
- Motorized Artillery Regiment.

The division was equipped with 20 Japanese-made tanks, 6 Type 90 75 mm field gun, several trucks and vehicles and 6774 personnel.

In February 1951, the division received equipment from 2 tank self-propelled artillery regiments of the Soviet Army: 60 T-34s, 12 IS-2s, 8 SU-122s, 4 T-34 tank tractors, 10 APCs, 13 repair vehicles and 100 automobiles.

On June 17, 1952, the 3rd Tank Division moved into Korea to take part in the Korean War as part of People's Volunteer Army(CPA). During its tour to Korea, it took part in 267 battles and engagements, destroyed or damaged 22 enemy tanks and 74 aircraft.

On March 24, 1953, the division was renamed as 3rd Tank Division(Chinese: 坦克第3师, note the change in Chinese characters).

From April to May 1954, the division pulled out of Korea and stayed in Siping. In November, the division was reorganized as an Army Tank Division of the National Defense Force, receiving 61 more T-34s and IS-2s, and 10 light tanks to its reconnaissance battalion. The division was then composed of 5902 personnel.

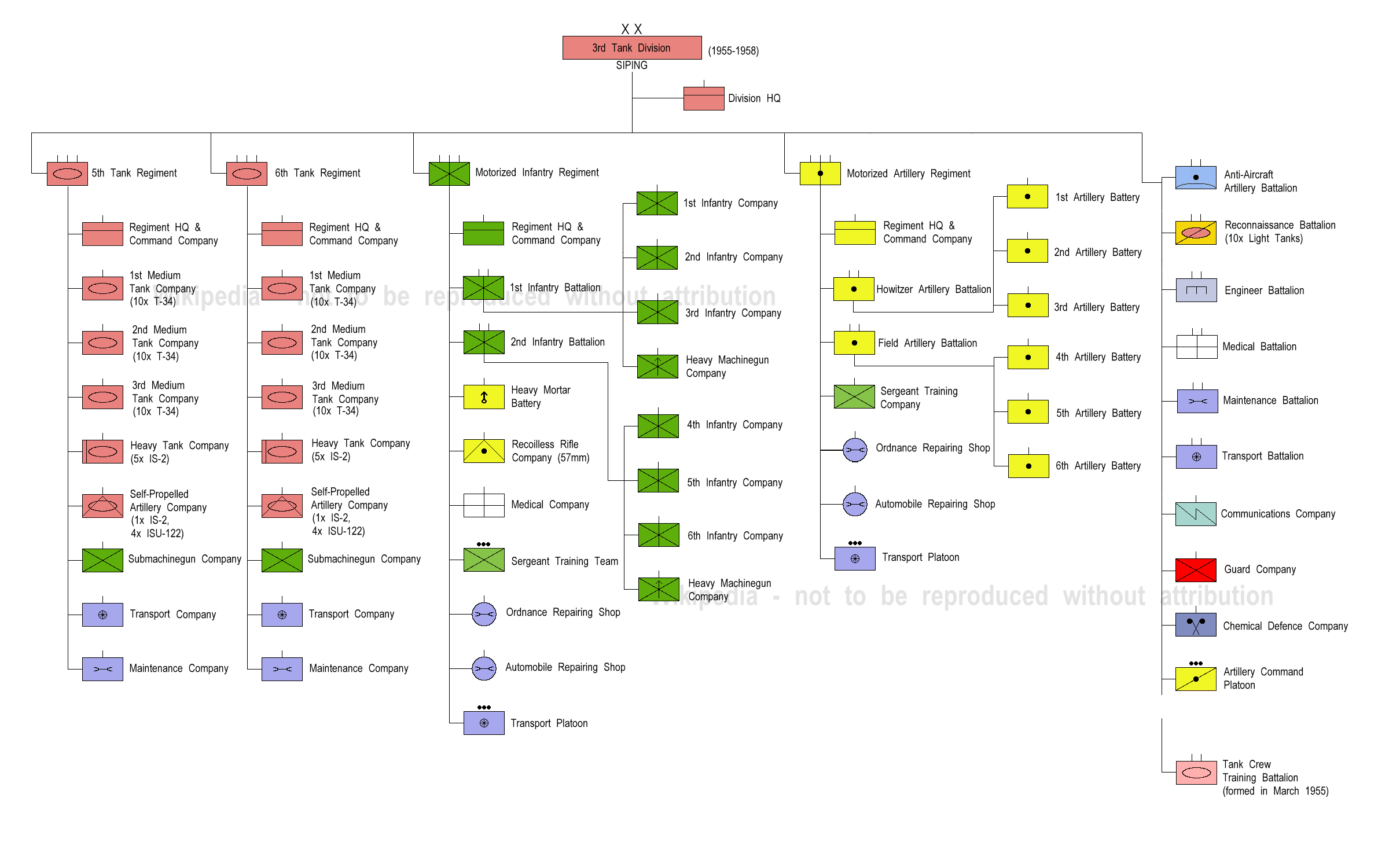
3rd Tank Division, Organization 1955-1958 as an "Army Tank Division of National Defense Force".

In 1958, the division was reorganized as an independent tank division. All heavy tank companies and self-propelled artillery batteries were detached, and 3 more medium tank companies were attached. Motorized Infantry Regiment was renamed as Mechanized Infantry Regiment. Motorized Artillery Regiment was renamed as Howitzer Artillery Regiment.

By then, the division was composed of:

- 5th Tank Regiment
- 6th Tank Regiment
- Mechanized Infantry Regiment
- Howitzer Artillery Regiment

The division was then equipped with 138 T-34s, 62 artillery pieces, 24 antiaircraft guns, and 5803 personnel.

In October 1962, the division was reorganized as a tank division, adding its personnel to 7690.

From August to November 1965, the division received 138 Type 59 tanks to replace all T-34s.

In January 1967, the Antiaircraft Artillery Regiment was activated.

From 1969 to 1970, the Antiaircraft Artillery Regiment, the 3rd Tank Division, took part in the Laotian Civil War to provide antiaircraft support for Chinese engineer troops. During its deployment, it shot down 4 enemy aircraft and damaged 2.

From March to May 1969, a detachment from Maintenance Battalion, 3rd Tank Division, took part in the recovery of a lost Soviet Army T-62 tank during the Zhenbao Island conflict. The tank is now preserved in the Military Museum of the Chinese People's Revolution.

In April 1969, the 321st Tank Self-Propelled Artillery Regiment from the 116th Army Division and the 322nd Tank Self-Propelled Artillery Regiment from the 117th Army Division attached to the division. On August 18, all 4 tank regiments were renamed. By then the division was composed of:

- 9th Tank Regiment (former 5th Tank Regiment);
- 10th Tank Regiment (former 6th Tank Regiment);
- 11th Tank Regiment (former 321st Tank Self-Propelled Artillery Regiment);
- 12th Tank Regiment (former 322nd Tank Self-Propelled Artillery Regiment);
- Mechanized Infantry Regiment;
- Artillery Regiment;
- Antiaircraft Artillery Regiment.

In May 1970, Antiaircraft Artillery Regiment was inactivated.

In March 1976, the division was converted to an army tank division, catalogue A. Its 11th Tank Regiment was detached and renamed as Tank Regiment, 39th Army Corps. Mechanized Infantry Regiment was renamed as Armored Infantry Regiment.

By then the division was composed of:

- 9th Tank Regiment;
- 10th Tank Regiment;
- 12th Tank Regiment;
- Armored Infantry Regiment;
- Artillery Regiment.

In January 1983, the division was attached to the 39th Army Corps.

In February 1984, the division became a combined arms army tank division (the only other one was the 6th Tank Division): Armored Infantry Regiment was renamed as Mechanized Regiment, and Antiaircraft Artillery Regiment reactivated. In October 1986, the Mechanized Regiment was renamed the Mechanized Infantry Regiment.

By then, the division was composed of:

- 9th Tank Regiment;
- 10th Tank Regiment;
- 12th Tank Regiment;
- Mechanized Infantry Regiment;
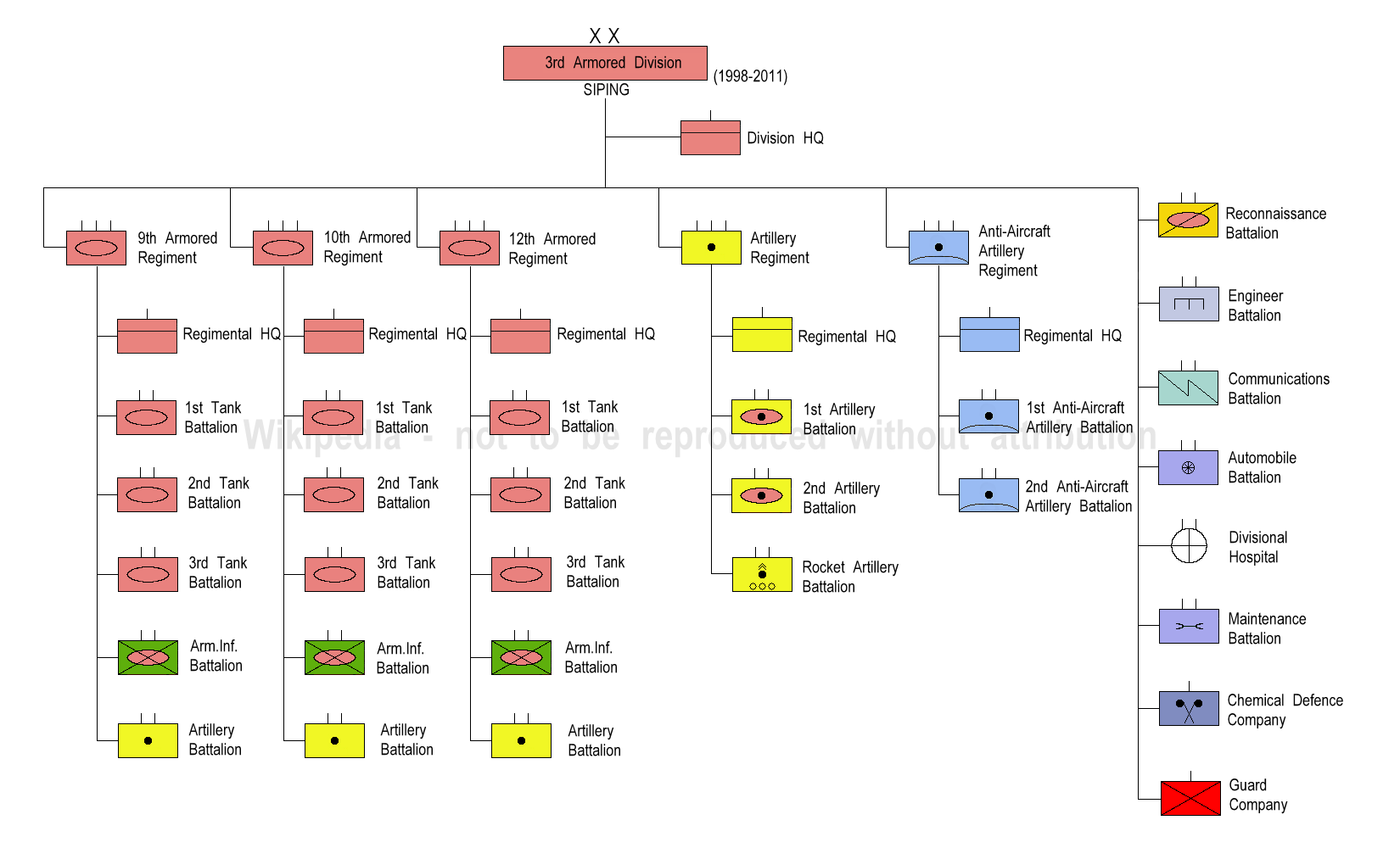
  3rd Armored Division, 39th Army, 1998-2011
- Artillery Regiment;
- Antiaircraft Artillery Regiment.

On October 16, 1998, the division was renamed as the 3rd Armored Division(Chinese: 装甲第3师). The Mechanized Infantry Regiment was disbanded and absorbed into tank regiments, which became armored regiments.

By then, the division was composed of:

- 9th Armored Regiment;
- 10th Armored Regiment;
- 12th Armored Regiment;
- Artillery Regiment;
- Antiaircraft Artillery Regiment.

In late 2011, the division was split into two: the division itself became the 3rd Armored Brigade (Chinese: 装甲第3旅), while half of its battalions formed the 202nd Mechanized Infantry Brigade.

In April 2017, the 3rd Armored Brigade was deactivated and merged into the 202nd Mechanized Infantry Brigade as the 202nd Combined Arms Brigade.

== Order of Battle Gallery ==
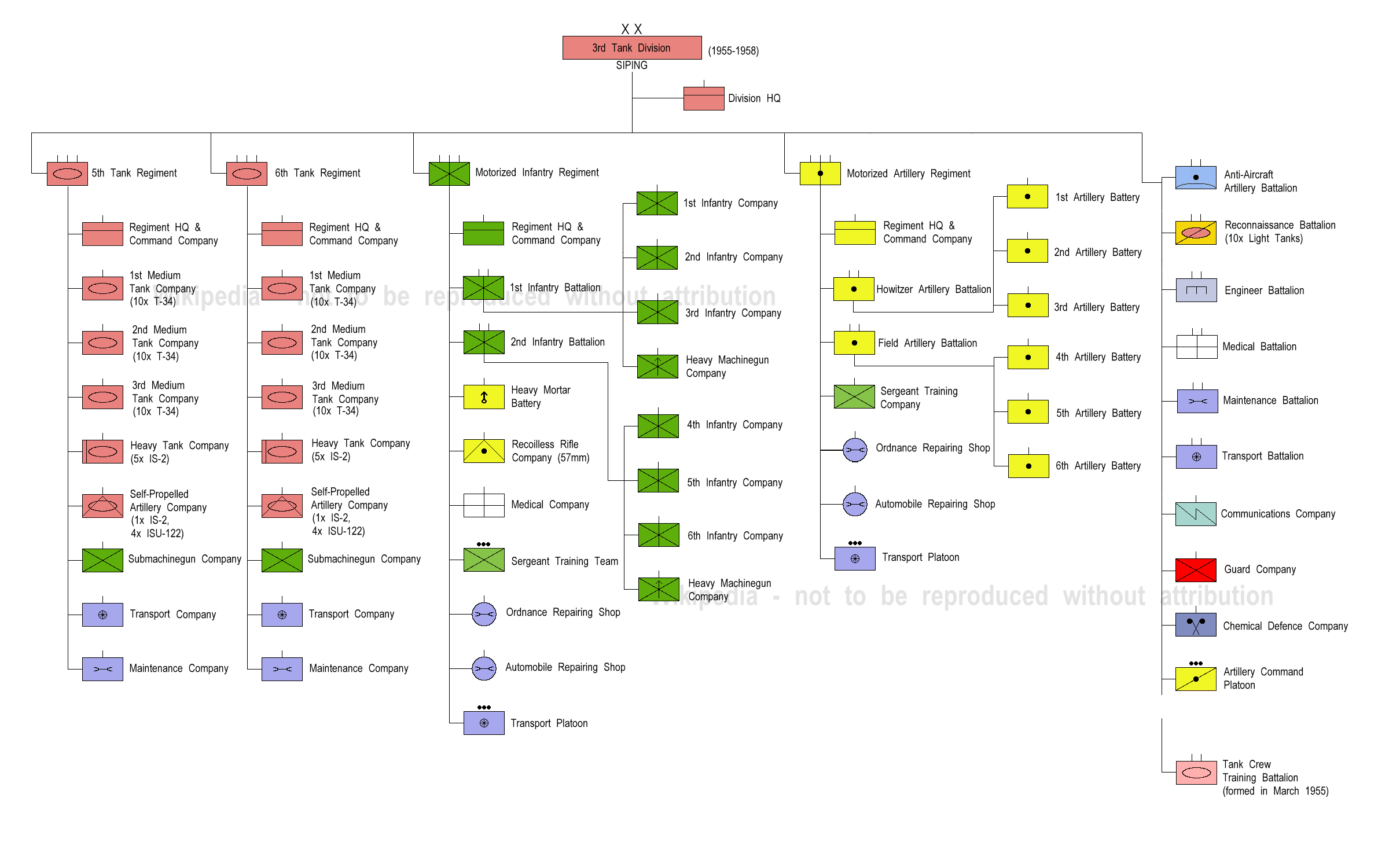
- 1955-1958:
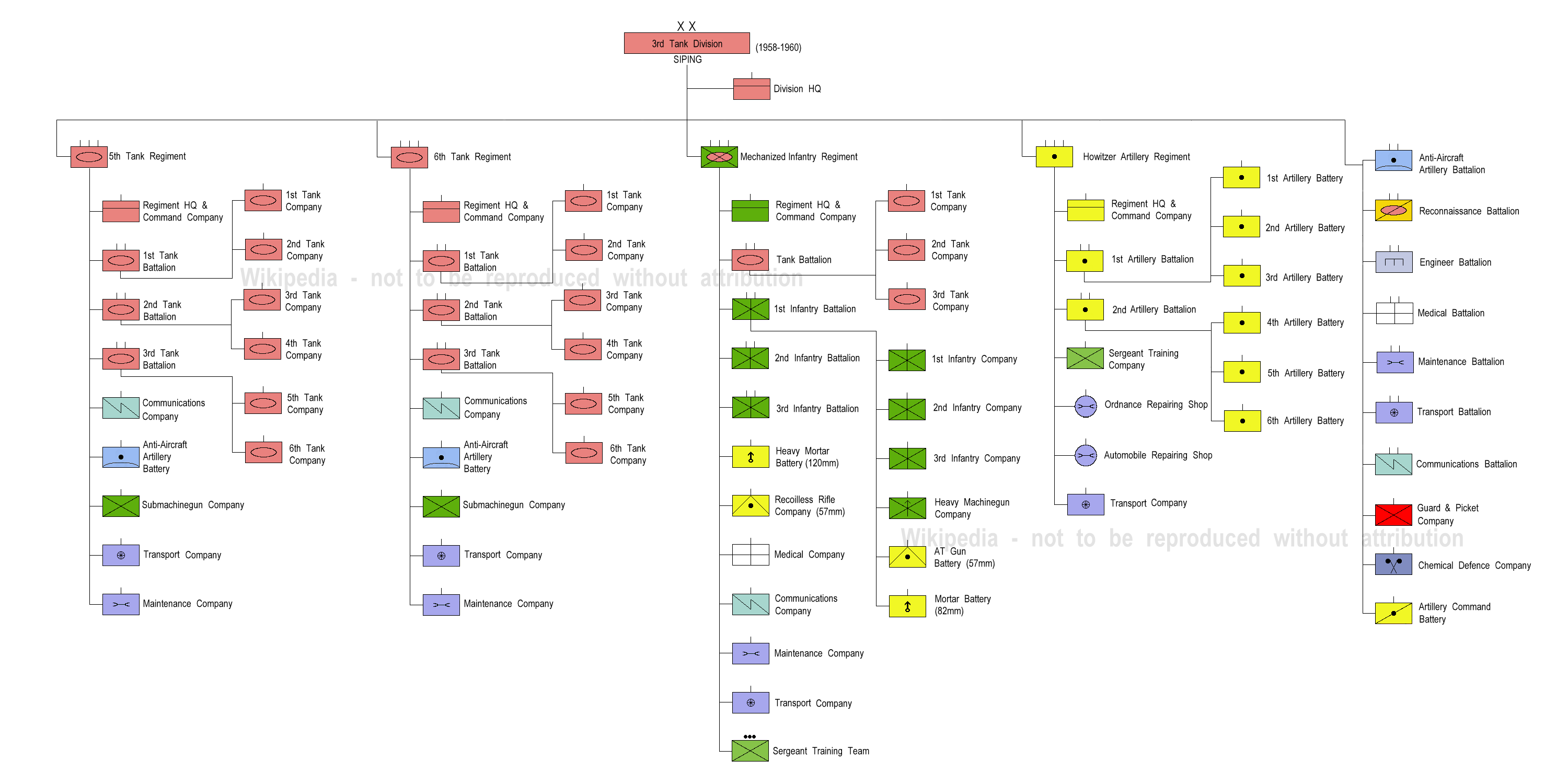
- 1958-1960:
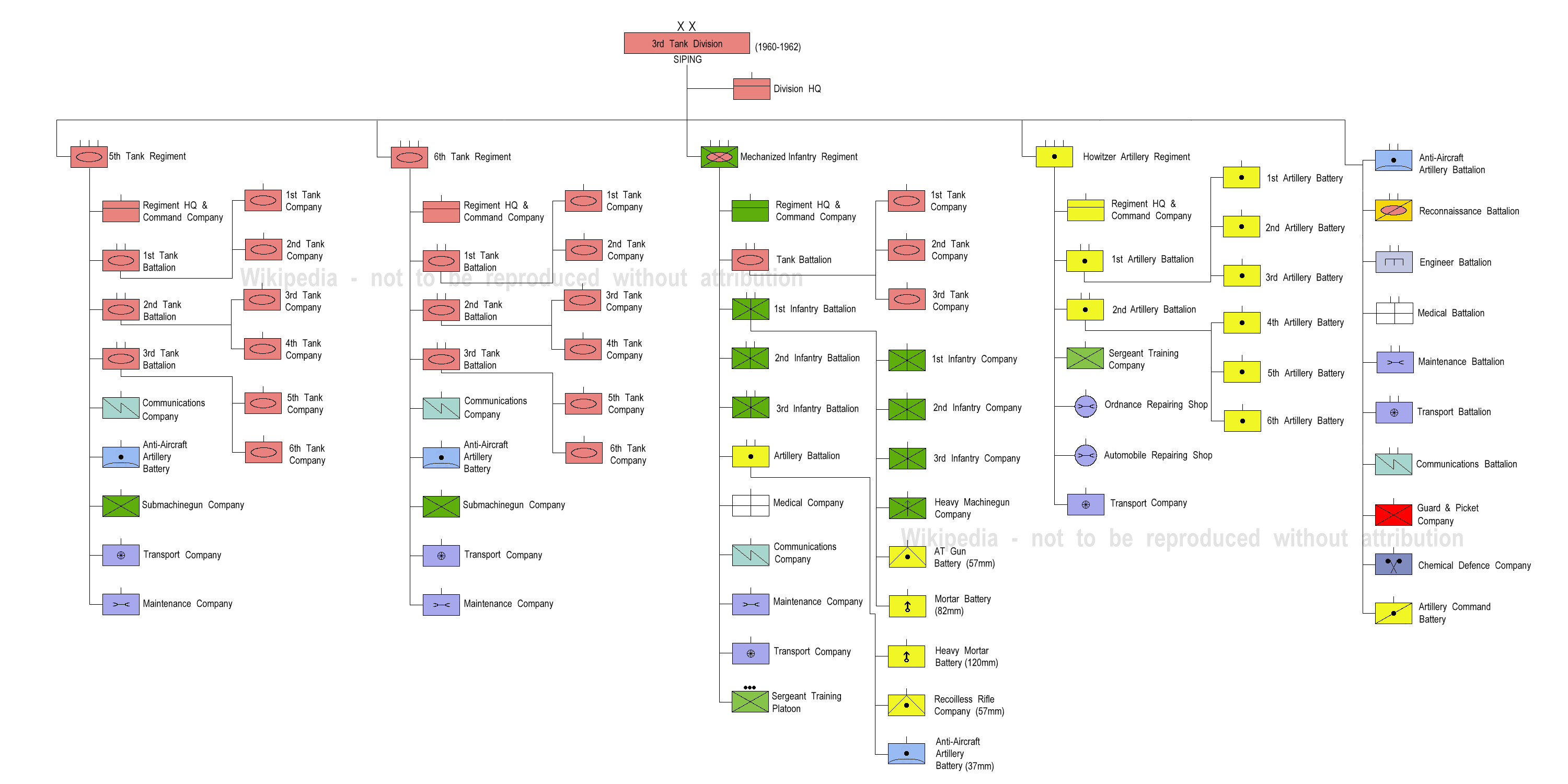
- 1960-1962:
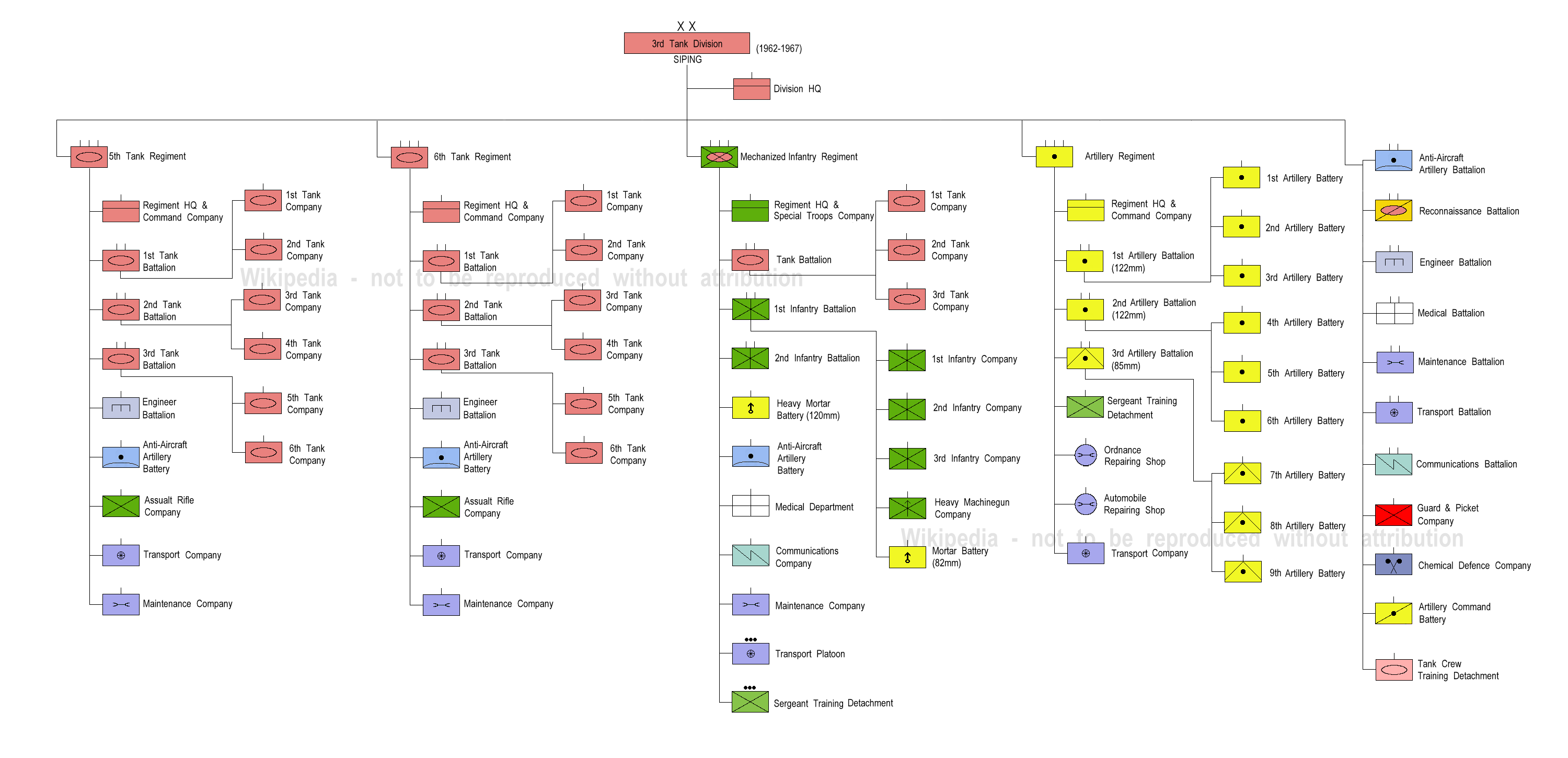
- 1962-1967:
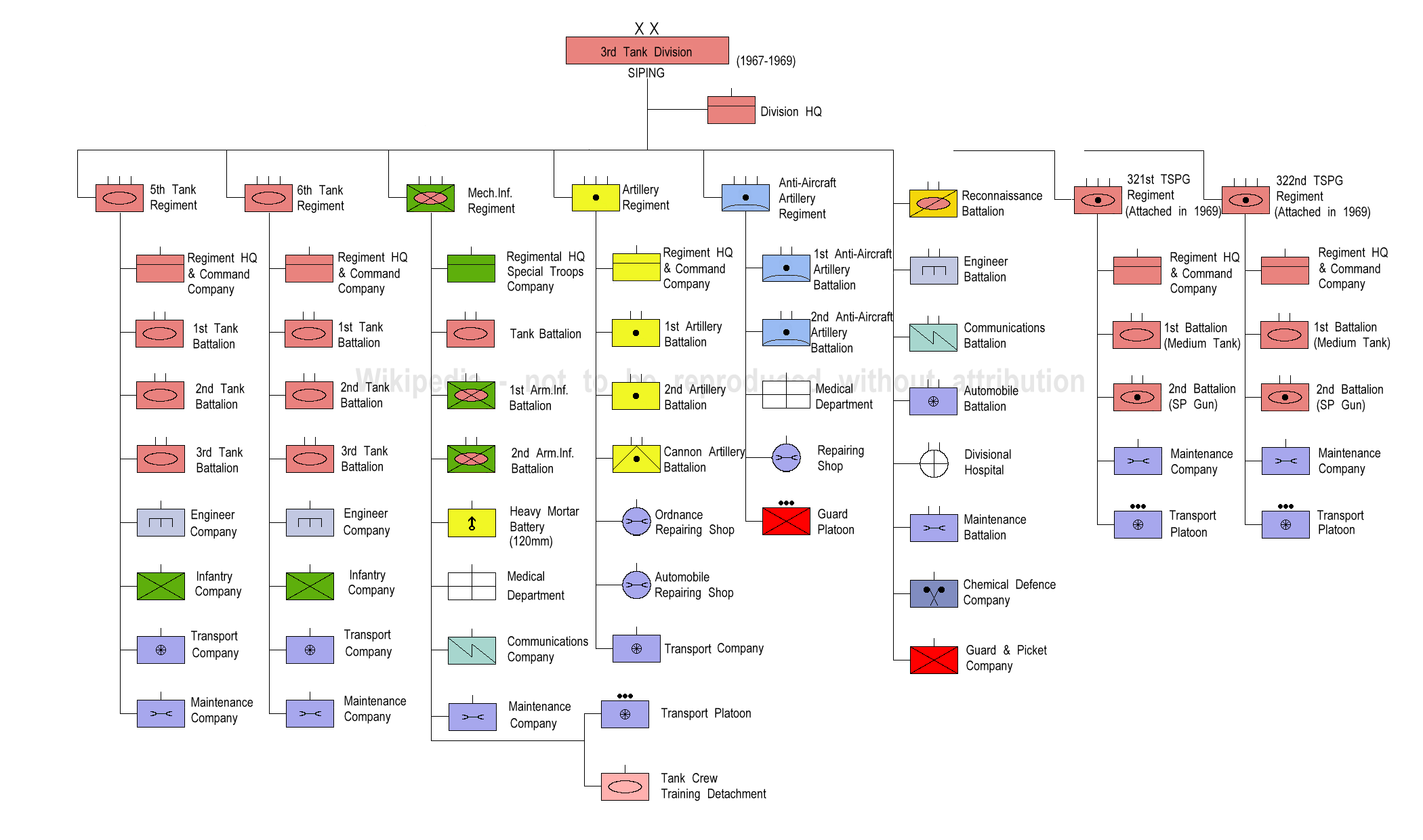
- 1967-1970:
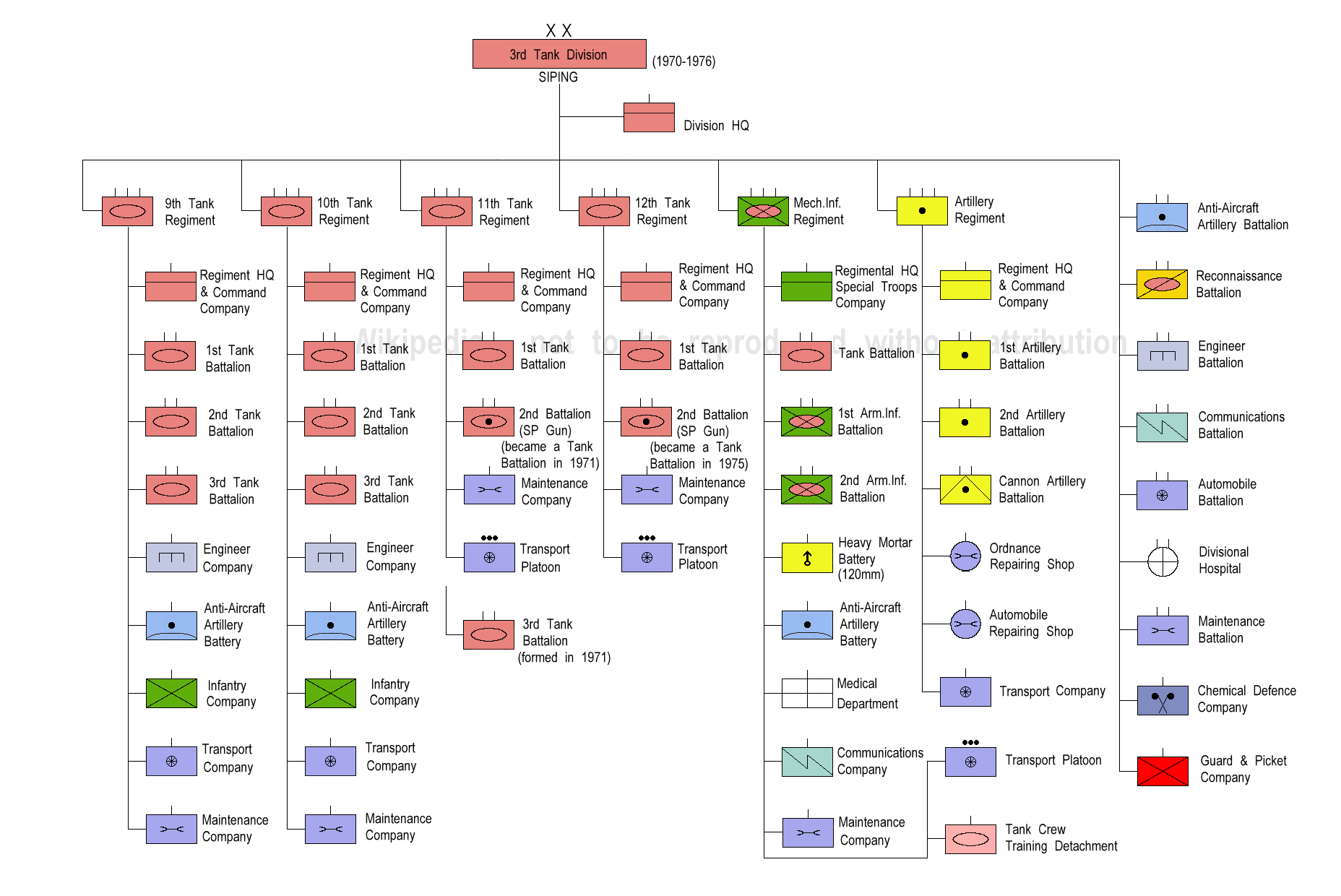
- 1970-1976:
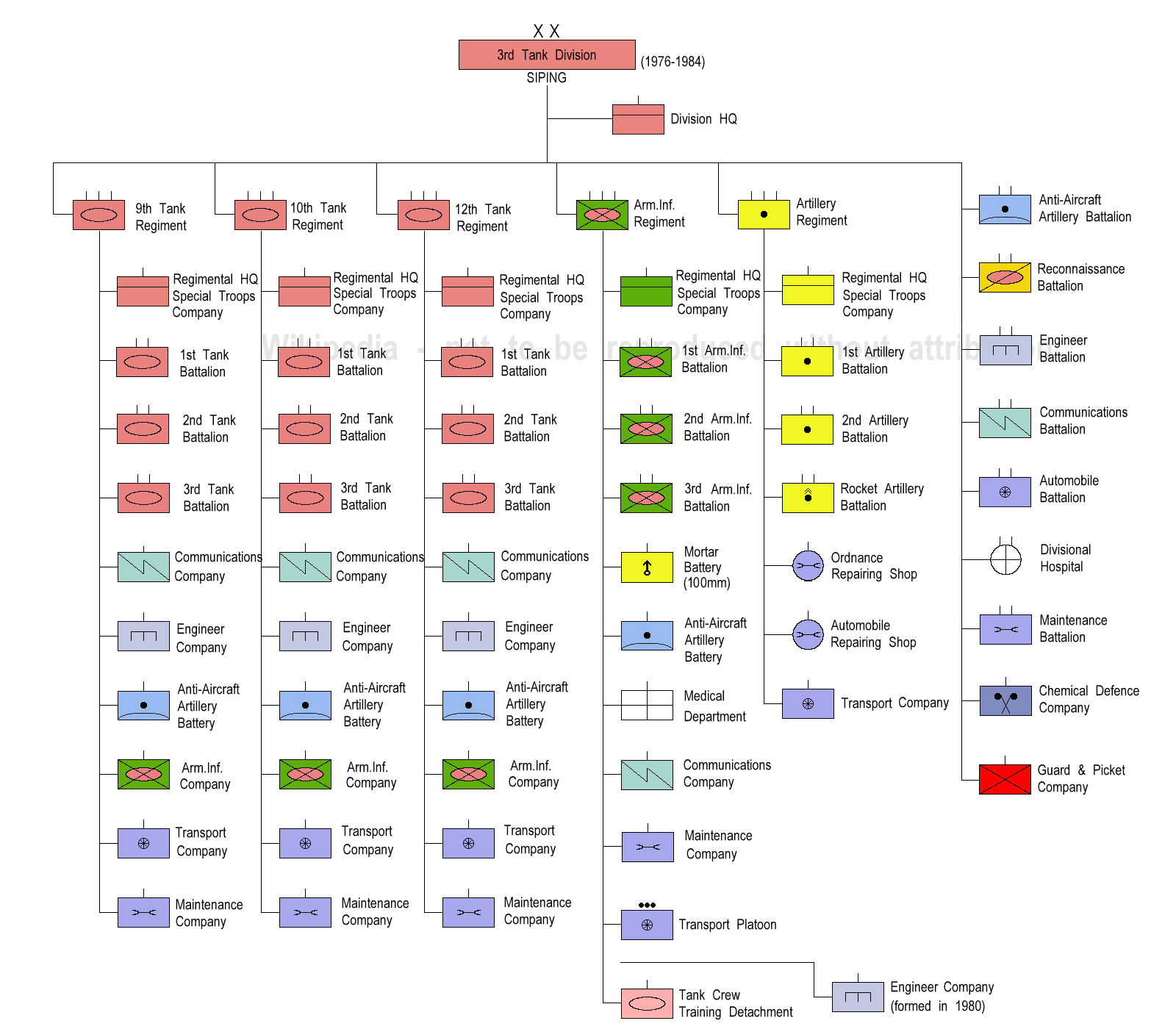
- 1976-1984:
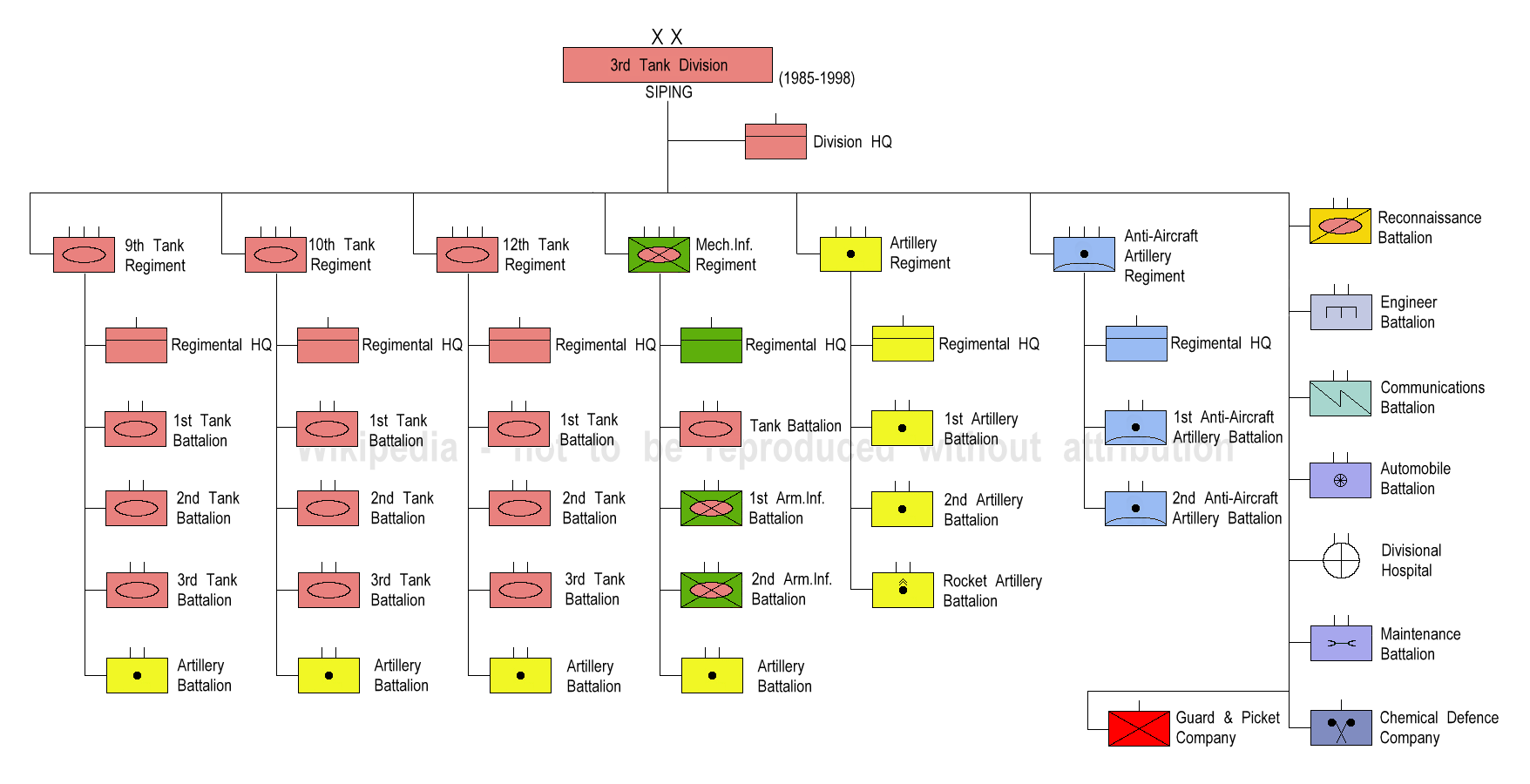
- 1984-1998:
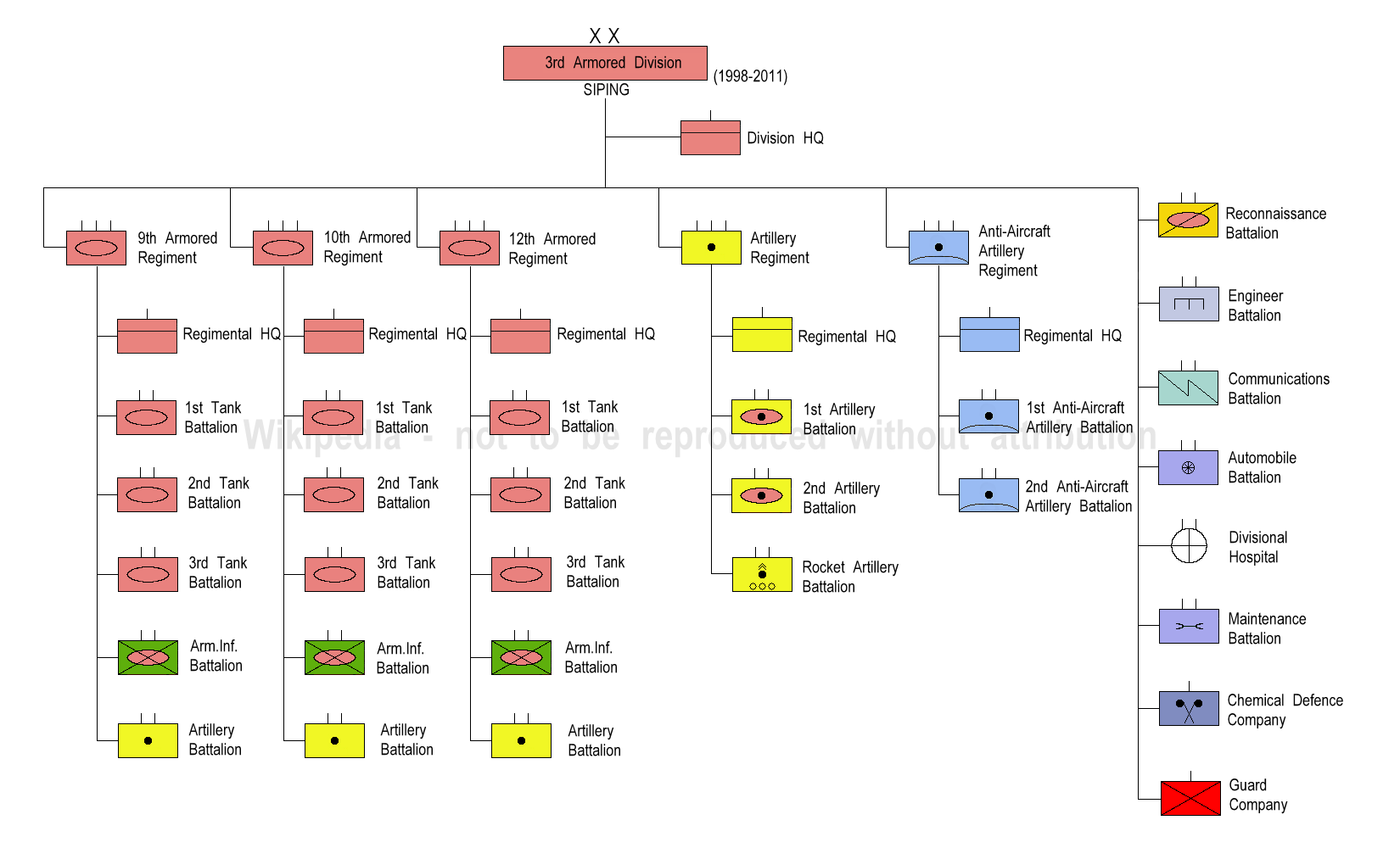
- 1998-2011:
