= Liu Lin (general) =

- 柳林

Commander of the Xinjiang Military District
- In office March 2021 – August 2021
- Preceded by: Wang Haijiang
- Succeeded by: TBA

Personal details
- Born: 1964 (age 61–62) Qingshui County, Tianshui, Gansu, China
- Party: Chinese Communist Party

Military service
- Allegiance: People's Republic of China
- Branch/service: People's Liberation Army Ground Force
- Years of service: ?–present
- Rank: Lieutenant general

Liu Lin (Chinese: 柳林; pinyin: Liǔ Lín; born 1964) is a lieutenant general (zhongjiang) of the People's Liberation Army (PLA) who served as commander of the Xinjiang Military District in 2021.

== Biography ==
Liu was born in 1964. He has served in the Xinjiang Military Region for a long time, serving successively as commander of the 8th Division of the Xinjiang Military Region, the chief of staff of the Nanjiang Military District (or Southern Xinjiang Military District), the deputy commander of the Southern Xinjiang Military District, and the commander of the Southern Xinjiang Military District. In the 2015 military parade, he led the tracked self-propelled artillery team to be reviewed. In July 2015, he became deputy commander of Nanjiang Military District, rising to commander in March 2019. In 2020, he led the delegations that participated in the India-China Commander Level Talks during the 2020–2021 China–India skirmishes. In March 2021, he was commissioned as commander of the Xinjiang Military District, replacing Wang Haijiang. In September 2021, he was admitted as a member of the standing committee of the Xinjiang Uygur Autonomous Regional Committee of the Chinese Communist Party, the region's top authority.

He was promoted to the rank of major general (shaojiang) in January 2015 and lieutenant general (zhongjiang) in 2021.

Military offices
Preceded by Wang Haijiang	Commander of the Xinjiang Military District; 2021	Succeeded by TBA
