= Deng Zhiping =

- 邓志平

Deputy Commander of the People's Liberation Army Ground Force
- Incumbent
- Assumed office March 2021
- Commander: Han Weiguo; Liu Zhenli

Personal details
- Born: May 1964 (age 61) Ji'an Special District, Jiangxi, China
- Party: Chinese Communist Party

Military service
- Allegiance: People's Republic of China
- Branch/service: People's Liberation Army Ground Force
- Years of service: ?–2024
- Rank: Lieutenant general
- Battles/wars: Battle of Laoshan

Chinese name
- Simplified Chinese: 邓志平
- Traditional Chinese: 鄧志平
Transcriptions
Standard Mandarin
- Hanyu Pinyin: Dèng Zhìpíng

Deng Zhiping (Chinese: 邓志平; born May 1964) is a lieutenant general in the People's Liberation Army of China who served as deputy commander of the People's Liberation Army Ground Force from 2021 to 2024. He was a delegate to the 14th National People's Congress.

== Biography ==
Deng was born in Ji'an Special District, Jiangxi, in May 1964.

In 1984, Deng participated in the Battle of Laoshan. In September 2012, he was appointed as deputy commander and chief of staff of the 14th Group Army, and served until February 2016, when he became deputy chief of staff of the Western Theater Command. In March 2021, he was commissioned as deputy commander of the People's Liberation Army Ground Force.

He was promoted to the rank of major general (shaojiang) in July 2013 and lieutenant general (zhongjiang) in March 2021.

== Downfall ==
On 13 September 2024, Deng's qualification for delegates to the 14th National People's Congress was terminated.
