= Linfen–Fushan Campaign =

1946 military campaign

- Part of the Chinese Civil War
Date	September 22, 1946 – September 24, 1946
Location	Shanxi, China
Result	Communist victory

Belligerents
National Revolutionary Army	Chinese Red Army

Commanders and leaders
Hu Zongnan	Chen Geng; Xie Fuzhi

Strength
11,500	8,800

Casualties and losses
5,000+	Unknown

The Linfen–Fushan Campaign (临浮战役) was a series of battles fought in regions between Linfen and Floating Mountain (Fushan, 浮山) in Shanxi, China between the nationalists and the communists during the Chinese Civil War and resulted in communist victory.

== Prelude ==
In the mid August 1946, the nationalists planned to redeploy four brigades from Shaanxi to Wing City (Yi Cheng, 翼城) and Linfen in southern Shanxi to push northward along the railroad in coordination with nationalists pushing southward from Pingyao and Jiexiu (介休), thus annihilating the communists in between at the Flooding Hole (Hong Dong, 洪洞) and Zhao's City (Zhao Cheng, 赵城) regions. The communists, in turn, deployed the 24th Brigade of the Taiyue (太岳) Military Region to the north of Lingshi (灵石) to stop the nationalists from the north, while the communist main force was prepared to ambush the nationalists from the south in regions between Linfen and Floating Mountain (Fushan, 浮山).

== Order of battle ==
The nationalist order of battle: 5 Brigades totaling 11,500:

- The Reorganized 30th Division
- The 1st Brigade of the Reorganized 1st Division
- The 167th Brigade of the Reorganized 1st Division

The communist order of battle: 4 Brigades totaling 8,800:

- The 10th Brigade of the 4th Column
- The 11th Brigade of the 4th Column
- The 13th Brigade of the 4th Column
- The 24th Brigade of the Taiyue (太岳) Military Region

== Campaign ==
On September 22, 1946, the nationalist 167th Brigade of the Reorganized 1st Division and the nationalist 27th Brigade of the Reorganized 30th Division took Floating Mountain (Fushan, 浮山), and the nationalist 2nd Regiment of the 1st Brigade of the 1st Division pushed eastward along the road from Floating Mountain (Fushan, 浮山) to Linfen. A portion of the communist 13th Brigade of the 4th Column faked attack on Floating Mountain (Fushan, 浮山), while its main force, along with the communist 11th Brigade of the 4th Column suddenly surrounded the nationalist 2nd Regiment of the 1st Brigade of the 1st Division at the Official Sparrow Village (Guan Que Cun, 官雀村) region between Floating Mountain (Fushan, 浮山) and Linfen. After dark, the enemy launched their assault under the cover of darkness on the besieged nationalists, and the nationalist 2nd Regiment of the 1st Brigade of the 1st Division was subsequently wiped out.

Unaware that their besieged comrades-in-arms had already been annihilated by the enemy at the Official Sparrow Village (Guan Que Cun, 官雀村) region, on September 23, 1946, the nationalist 167th Brigade of the Reorganized 1st Division and the nationalist 27th Brigade of the Reorganized 30th Division abandoned Floating Mountain (Fushan, 浮山) to reinforce their besieged comrades-in-arms from the east, while the nationalist 1st Brigade of the Reorganized 1st Division attempted to reinforce their besieged comrades-in-arms from Linfen. The communist 13th Brigade of the 4th Column managed to stop the nationalist reinforcement from the east, while the communist 10th Brigade of the 4th Column besieged the nationalist reinforcement from the west at the Chen's Levee Village (Chen Yan Cun, 陈堰村) region. After the arrival of the main force of the communist 4th Column and the communist 24 Brigade of the Taiyue (太岳) Military Region, the final assault begun at the dusk on September 23, 1946. After a fierce battle that lasted the entire night, the nationalist 1st Brigade of the Reorganized 1st Division was completely annihilated by next morning. Hearing the news of the defeat, the nationalist 167th Brigade of the Reorganized 1st Division and the nationalist 27th Brigade of the Reorganized 30th Division immediately gave up the fight and retreated to Linfen while the communist 13th Brigade of the 4th Column wisely chose not to pursuit, and the campaign was concluded.

== Outcome ==
The nationalist defeat cost more than 5,000 casualties, and the original nationalist hope of eliminate the enemy by attacking simultaneously from the north and the south was crashed. However, the political and psychological impact was much more greater than the military defeat: the Nationalist Reorganized 1st Brigade, or nicknamed the "1st [Best] Brigade Under the Heaven" (天下第一旅), was completely annihilated, with its commander lieutenant general Huang Zhengcheng (黄正诚) captured alive by the communist enemy. After the campaign, the nationalist adopted the correct tactics of not engaging the enemy and hold on the strongholds behind the city walls, but although such tactics reduced loss, it had left vast rural area to the communists.

== See also ==
- Outline of the Chinese Civil War
- National Revolutionary Army
- History of the People's Liberation Army
