= Chen Geng =

Chinese military officer

- 陈赓
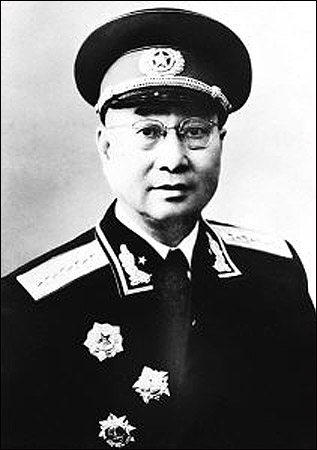
- Chen Geng

Vice-Minister of National Defense
- In office 16 September 1959 – 16 March 1961
- Minister: Lin Biao

Deputy Chief of the People's Liberation Army General Staff Department
- In office 31 October 1954 – October 1959
- Chief: Su Yu→Huang Kecheng

President of PLA Military Engineering Institute
- In office 11 July 1952 – 16 March 1961
- Preceded by: Position established
- Succeeded by: Liu Juying

Political Commissar of PLA Military Engineering Institute
- In office September 1953 – May 1958
- Preceded by: Position established
- Succeeded by: Xie Youfa

Chairman of Yunnan Government
- In office January 1950 – April 1955
- Preceded by: Position established
- Succeeded by: Guo Yingqiu

Military Advisor to Democratic Republic of Vietnam
- In office 1949–1955

Personal details
- Born: February 27, 1903 Xiangxiang, Hunan, Qing Empire
- Died: March 16, 1961 (aged 58) Shanghai, People's Republic of China
- Party: Chinese Communist Party
- Spouse(s): Wang Genying; Fu Ya
- Children: 5
- Parent(s): Chen Daoliang; Peng Xuexian
- Education: Whampoa Military Academy; Counter-Japanese Military and Political University
- Awards: Order of Bayi (First Class Medal); Order of Independence and Freedom (First Class Medal); Order of Liberation (First Class Medal)

Military service
- Allegiance: People's Republic of China
- Branch/service: People's Liberation Army Ground Force
- Years of service: 1923–1961
- Rank: Senior General
- Battles/wars: Chinese Civil War; Campaign along the Southern Section of Datong–Puzhou Railway; Houma Campaign; Second Sino-Japanese War; First Indochina War; Korean War

Chinese name
- Traditional Chinese: 陳賡
- Simplified Chinese: 陈赓
Transcriptions
Standard Mandarin
- Hanyu Pinyin: Chén Gēng
- Wade–Giles: Chen^{2} Geng^{1}

Chen Geng (Chinese: 陈赓; 27 February 1903 - 16 March 1961) was a Chinese military officer who served as a senior general in the People's Liberation Army. Enlisting in a warlord's army at the age of 13, Chen Geng joined the Chinese Communist Party in 1922 and was accepted into Whampoa Military Academy in 1924. He approached Chiang Kai-shek and even saved his life by preventing him from committing suicide. He served as a Communist spy in the National Revolutionary Army for 6 years. After being discovered, he joined the Communist base in Jiangxi and participated in the Long March. He fought the Imperial Japanese Army during the Second Sino-Japanese War and then the Nationalists during the Chinese Civil War. Once victory was obtained, he went to Vietnam to help Hồ Chí Minh against the French during the First Indochina War and then participated in the Korean War with the People's Volunteer Army. He became a Senior General in 1955. He then founded an academy of military technologies but died before finalizing the ballistic missile and nuclear weapons programs.

== Biography ==
Born in Xiangxiang, Hunan, Chen Geng was the second child in a sibling group of 12. His grandfather Chen Yihuai (陈益怀) was an officer in the Xiang Army led by Zeng Guofan, a statesman, military general, and Confucian scholar of the late Qing dynasty (1644–1911). After his retirement, Chen Yihuai bought agricultural land with the reward, and by the time Chen Geng was born, his family owned several hundred mu and became one of the wealthiest in the region. Chen's father was named Chen Daoliang and his mother named Peng Xuexian. But as his only older brother died young from illness, Chen became the eldest son of the family. At 13, his father arranged a marriage with a daughter two years older, but Chen refused the marriage and left his family to join the warlord's army. It was a disillusioned Chen who left the army at 18 and found a job at the Hunan Railway Bureau as a receptionist. During this period, he met Mao Zedong.

Chen joined the Chinese Communist Party in 1922 and studied at Whampoa Military Academy in 1924. Chen, Jiang Xianyun, and He Zhonghan, were considered the top three students of the academy at the time. Chen gained the confidence of Chiang Kai-shek and became commander of his garrison. In October 1925, during the second campaign against the local warlord Chen Jiongming, Chiang suffered a stunning defeat, Chiang was covered with shame but refused to flee, trying to kill himself. Chen Geng managed to take his pistol and piggy backed him for around 10 km out of danger. He thus gained Chiang's confidence; however, when the Kuomintang broke ties with the Communists in 1927, Chen went underground as a Communist agent in Shanghai.

In March 1933, Chen was sent to Shanghai to treat his leg wounds, but Chen was captured in Shanghai by the Kuomintang. But since he once saved Chiang Kai-shek's life, his life was spared. Chiang ordered his transfer to house arrest and does not send him to prison. Chen escaped a month later with the help of Song Qingling and other Communists. He moved to the Central Soviet Area and was appointed president of Peng Pai Yang Yin Infantry School (彭湃杨殷步兵学校). From October 1934 to December 1935, he fought against the Kuomintang army in Guizhou and then in Shanxi, Shaanxi and Gansu in 1936. In February 1937 he was accepted to Counter-Japanese Military and Political University.

When the Second Sino-Japanese War broke out, Chen was appointed Commander of the 386th Brigade, which he led in victories against the Imperial Japanese army, and his brigade was considered the best in China. Following the establishment of the Second United Front, Chen Geng was given the official rank of Major General by the National Revolutionary Army. In 1940, he led his brigade to Shanxi during Hundred Regiments Offensive. After the surrender of Japan in 1945, Chen's brigade became the 4th Column of the Shanxi-Henan-Hebei-Shandong Military District. He led his troops in important battles of the Chinese Civil War such as the Shangdang Campaign, the Datong-Puzhou Campaign, Linfen–Fushan Campaign and Lüliang Campaign, the Campaign in the Eastern Foothills of the Funiu Mountains, and the Huaihai Campaign. The war ended and the 4th Column became the 4th Army Group, and Chen served as commander and political commissar. His troops entered Yunnan in 1949.

At the request of Chen's longtime friend Hồ Chí Minh, he entered French Indochina to help Võ Nguyên Giáp launch a series of attacks on isolated French bases along the Chinese border in 1950. A CIA report on 5 February 1952 named Chen Geng as 1st Deputy Commander of the "Chinese Communist Aid DRV Volunteers" force, with Zhou Baozhong as his contemporary, Liu Bocheng as Commander and Zhuang Tian in the role of Chief of Staff. Back from French Indochina, he left for the Korean War and served as commander and political commissioner of the 3rd Army of the People's Volunteer Army. When Commander Peng Dehuai returned to China, Chen temporarily took command. He was awarded the military rank of senior general in September 1955 by Chairman Mao Zedong. His brother-in-law, Tan Zheng, who was married to Chen's sister, Chen Qiuju, was strongly influenced by Chen to join the Communists and became a senior general at the same time.

Returning from the Korean War, Chen founded the PLA Military Engineering Institute in Harbin, engaging in the development of technological weapons. The school became one of the most famous universities in China in a few years. Because of his experience, Chen focused on China's ballistic missile and nuclear weapons program. He died of a heart attack in Shanghai on March 16, 1961.

== Personal life ==
In 1927 Chen married Wang Genying (王根英), who was killed in the Second Sino-Japanese War. They had a son:

- Chen Zhifei (陈知非), engineer.

In February 1942, he married Fu Ya (傅涯), the couple had four children, one daughter and three sons, in order of birth:

- Chen Zhijian (陈知建), military officer.
- Chen Zhijin (陈知进), medical doctor and professor, only daughter.
- Chen Zhishu (陈知庶), military officer.
- Chen Zhiya (陈知涯), politician.

Chen Geng was well known as a joker and a prankster amongst comrades. He was a performer and was well known for his gags and play acting. This proved instrumental in his underground work where at one point he was even hired to investigate himself. He was jovial and well liked by both Communist comrades as well as former classmates in Whampoa who became Nationalist officers as well as Chiang Kai-shek. This, as well as having once saved Chiang's life a decade ago, proved critical for his release from Chiang's custody in 1933. He had a caring attitude towards comrades and was instrumental in arranging Peng Dehuai's marriage to Pu Anxiu. He was the only Communist Whampoa student to visit his rehabilitated former classmates that had come out of Gongde Lin prison. He remained humble post appointment to General 1st Class and joked to his children that he was appointed General Chilli Sauce, since he was from Hunan and loved chilli sauce.

Government offices
Preceded by Position established	Chairman (Governor) of Yunnan Government; 1950–1955	Succeeded by Guo Yingqiu
Military offices
Preceded by Position established	President of PLA Military Engineering Institute; 1952–1961	Succeeded by Liu Juying
Preceded by Position established	Political Commissar of PLA Military Engineering Institute; 1953–1958	Succeeded by Xie Youfa
