= Phong Thổ =

- Commune
- Vietnamese border marker in the Huổi Luông area
- Interactive map of Phong Thổ
- Coordinates: 22.546523284239306°N 103.29290275551986°E
- Country: Vietnam
- Province: Lai Châu
- Region: Northwest
- Established: 16 June 2025
- Seat: Tổ Hữu Nghị

Area
  - Total: 266.71 km^{2} (102.98 sq mi)

Population (2025)
  - Total: 23,295
  - Density: 87/km^{2} (230/sq mi)

Phong Thổ is a commune in Lai Châu province, Vietnam.

On 16 June 2025:

- The National Assembly of Vietnam adopted Resolution No. 203/2025/QH15 amending and supplementing several articles of the Constitution of the Socialist Republic of Vietnam. Under the resolution, district-level administrative units nationwide ceased to operate from 1 July 2025.
- The Standing Committee of the National Assembly of Vietnam issued Resolution No. 1670/NQ-UBTVQH15 on the reorganization of commune-level administrative units in Lai Châu province in 2025. Under the resolution, the entire area and population of Phong Thổ township and the former communes of Huổi Luông, Ma Li Pho, and Mường So were consolidated to form a new commune named Phong Thổ.
