= Bình Lư =

Bình Lư Xã Bình Lư
- Commune
- Bình Lư commune
- Location within Vietnam
- Coordinates: 22°19′33″N 103°37′02″E
- Country: Vietnam
- Region: Northwest
- Province: Lai Châu
- Time zone: UTC+7 (UTC + 7)

Bình Lư is a commune (xã) of Lai Châu Province, Vietnam.

On 16 June 2025, the Standing Committee of the National Assembly promulgated a Resolution on the rearrangement of commune-level administrative units of Lai Châu Province in 2025. Accordingly, the entire natural area and population of Tam Đường Township, Sơn Bình Commune, and Bình Lư Commune are rearranged to form a new commune named Bình Lư Commune.
