= Mường Khương =

Mường Khương Xã Mường Khương
- Commune
- Mường Khương commune
- Location within Vietnam
- Coordinates: 22°45′40″N 104°07′30″E
- Country: Vietnam
- Region: Northwest
- Province: Lào Cai
- Time zone: UTC+7 (UTC + 7)

Mường Khương is a commune (xã) of Lào Cai Province, Vietnam.

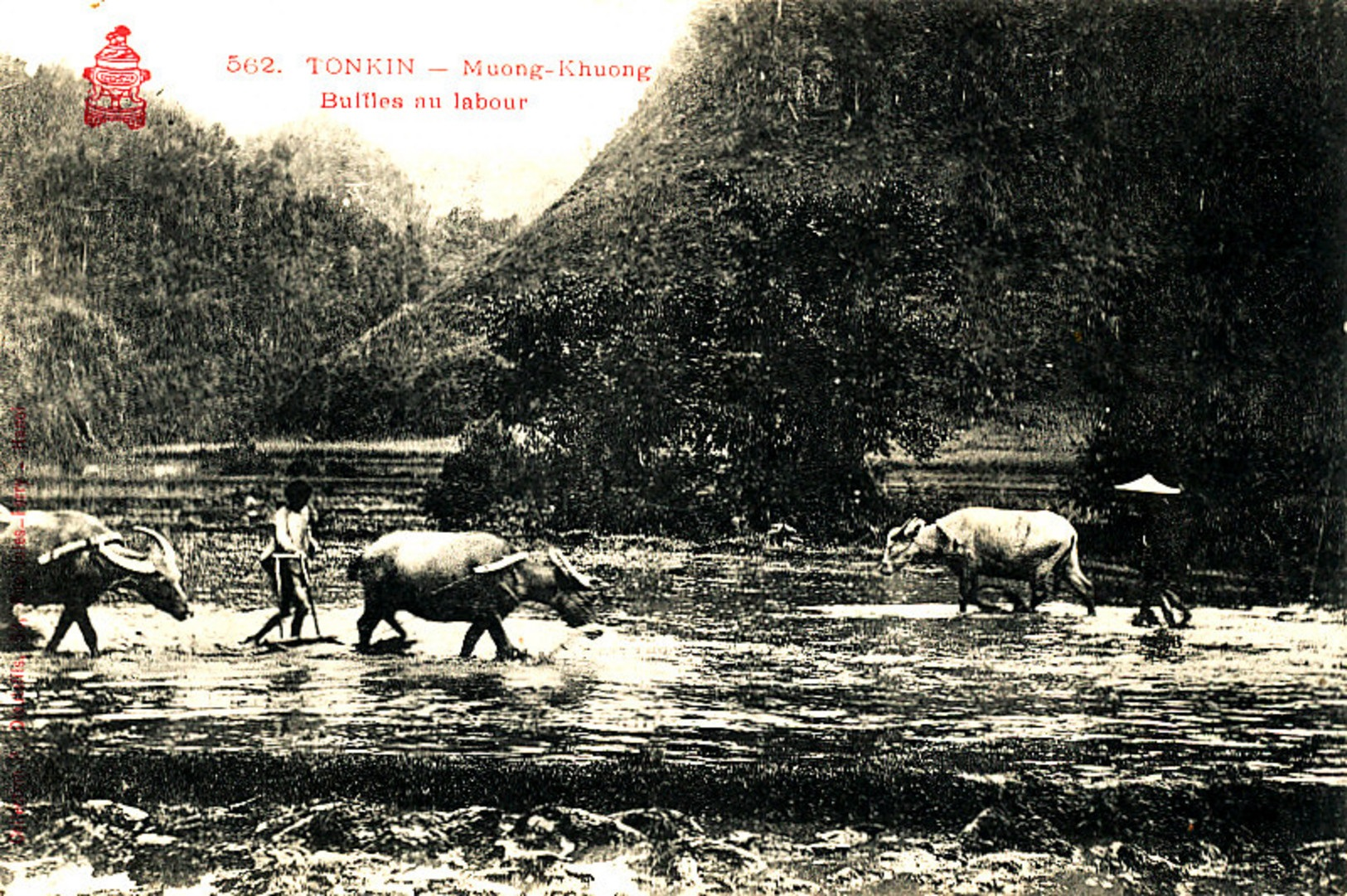
In 1906.
