= Xiazhuang =

Xiazhuang may refer to the following locations in China:

- Xiazhuang Township (下庄乡), Fuping County, Hebei

Written as "夏庄镇":

- Xiazhuang, Gucheng County, Hebei, town
- Xiazhuang, Xi County, Henan, town in Xi County, Henan
- Xiazhuang, Gaomi, town in Gaomi, Shandong
- Xiazhuang, Ju County, town in Ju County, Shandong
- Xiazhuang, Rongcheng, Shandong, town in Rongcheng, Shandong
