= Sun Wenguang =

- 孙文广
- Sun Wenguang
- Born: August 26, 1934; Rongcheng, Shandong, China
- Education: Shandong University
- Occupation: Physicist
- Known for: Political activism

Sun Wenguang (simplified Chinese: 孙文广; traditional Chinese: 孫文廣; born August 26, 1934) was an activist and vocal critic of the Chinese government. He was a professor of Physics at Shandong University in Jinan from 1982 until 1994 when he retired.

== Early life ==
Sun Wenguang was born in Rongcheng City on August 26, 1934. His father was a naval officer of the National Government. Sun joined the Navy in his early years.

== Career ==
Sun was a professor of Physics at Shandong University in Jinan from 1982 until 1994 when he retired.

== Activism ==
Sun has a history of criticizing the Chinese government, being one of the original signatories of Charter 08 and has been harassed for relations with critics of Communist China.

On April 5, 2009, Sun and a university student left to go to a local cemetery called Heroes’ Mountain (Yingxiong Shan; 英雄山) on a holiday to honor the dead. He was to visit the grave of Zhao Ziyang, a former Chinese Premier and Communist Party general secretary who died in 2005. When Sun entered the cemetery in Jinan, four or five men attacked him and beat him severely. He was admitted shortly after to Jinan hospital with three broken ribs and injuries to his spine, head, back, arms and legs. Later in 2010, Sun's passport application was rejected shortly before the Nobel Peace Prize ceremony for Liu Xiaobo.

On August 1, 2018, Sun was giving an interview with Voice of America in which he expressed opinions about Chinese Communist Party general secretary Xi Jinping and government expenditures outside China when the interview was ended abruptly after Chinese security forces entered his house and seized him. Sun is reported to be locked in currently and two VOA journalists Feng Yibing and Allen Ai were seized for several hours after trying to reach Sun in August 2018.

In 2022, it was reported that Sun may have died in 2021, at the age of 87. However, the relevant Chinese authorities refused to confirm the validity of these reports.

== Writing ==
His books, published in Hong Kong, include:

- Against the Wind for 33 Years: Dictatorship after 1977 versus Constitutional Democracy
- Essays from Within and Without of Prison
- Calling for Freedom
- A Country in a Century of Trouble: From Mao Zedong to Jiang Zemin
- Essays on Chinese Central Government and CCP from Prison.
