= Buliu =

Buliu 埠柳镇
- Town
- Location in Shandong
- Coordinates: 37°19′59″N 122°25′54″E
- Country: People's Republic of China
- Province: Shandong
- Prefecture-level city: Weihai
- County-level city: Rongcheng
- Time zone: UTC+8 (China Standard)

Buliu (Chinese: 埠柳镇) is a town in Rongcheng City, Weihai, in eastern Shandong province, China.

== Notable people ==
- Wang Yongguo, vice admiral in the People's Liberation Army Navy (PLAN) of China, commander of the South Sea Fleet from 1994 to 2002.
