= Wang Jianwei (general) =

- 王建伟

Political Commissar of National University of Defense Technology
- In office July 2010 – July 2017
- Preceded by: Xu Yitian
- Succeeded by: Liu Nianguang

Head of Propaganda Division of the People's Liberation Army General Political Department
- In office September 2007 – July 2010
- Preceded by: Wu Changde
- Succeeded by: Zhou Tao

President of PLA Nanjing Political College
- In office March 2006 – August 2007
- Succeeded by: Jiang Qianlin

Personal details
- Born: October 1954 (age 71–72) Xinhuang Dong Autonomous County, Hunan, China
- Party: Chinese Communist Party
- Education: Xinhuang No.1 High School

Military service
- Allegiance: People's Republic of China
- Branch/service: People's Liberation Army Ground Force
- Rank: Lieutenant general

Chinese name
- Traditional Chinese: 王建偉
- Simplified Chinese: 王建伟
Transcriptions
Standard Mandarin
- Hanyu Pinyin: Wáng Jiànwěi

Wang Jianwei (Chinese: 王建伟; born October 1954) is a lieutenant general (zhongjiang) in the Chinese People's Liberation Army. He was promoted to the rank of major general in July 2004 and lieutenant general in July 2011. He was Political Commissioner of National University of Defense Technology between July 2010 and July 2017.

== Biography ==
Wang was born in Xinhuang Dong Autonomous County, Hunan, China in October 1954, while his ancestral home in Laizhou, Shandong. He enlisted in the People's Liberation Army (PLA) in November 1969. He participated in the Sino-Vietnamese War. After war, he served in the Guangzhou Military Region for a long time. In October 2002, he was promoted to become Director of Political Department of the 75th Group Army. He became a professor at National University of Defense Technology in August 2005. He was President of PLA Nanjing Political College in March 2006, and held that office until August 2007, when he was appointed Head of Propaganda Division of the People's Liberation Army General Political Department. He became Political Commissar of National University of Defense Technology in July 2010, and served until July 2017.

He is a delegate to the 19th National Congress of the Chinese Communist Party.

Military offices
| Preceded by ? | President of PLA Nanjing Political College; 2006–2007 | Succeeded by Jiang Qianlin (蒋乾麟) |
| Preceded by Wu Changde | Head of Propaganda Division of the People's Liberation Army General Political Department; 2007–2010 | Succeeded by Zhou Tao (周涛) |
| Preceded by Xu Yitian | Political Commissar of National University of Defense Technology; 2010–2017 | Succeeded by Liu Nianguang |
