= Tengjia =

Tengjia 滕家镇
- Town
- Location in Shandong
- Coordinates: 37°03′12″N 122°20′57″E
- Country: People's Republic of China
- Province: Shandong
- Prefecture-level city: Weihai
- District: Rongcheng
- Time zone: UTC+8 (China Standard)

Tengjia (Chinese: 滕家镇) is a town in Rongcheng City, Weihai, in eastern Shandong province, China.
