= Gangxi, Shandong =

Gangxi 港西镇
- Town
- Location in Shandong
- Coordinates: 37°22′57″N 122°25′23″E
- Country: People's Republic of China
- Province: Shandong
- Prefecture-level city: Weihai
- District: Rongcheng
- Time zone: UTC+8 (China Standard)

Gangxi (Chinese: 港西镇) is a town in Rongcheng City, Weihai, in eastern Shandong province, China.
