= Wang Yongguo =

Chinese vice admiral (1938–2026)

- 王永国

Commander of the South Sea Fleet
- In office November 1994 – January 2002
- Political Commissar: Kang Fuquan; Zhao Yingfu; Wu Huayang
- Preceded by: He Linzhong
- Succeeded by: Wu Shengli

Personal details
- Born: November 1938 Buliu, Shandong, China
- Died: 7 May 2026 (aged 87) Guangzhou, Guangdong, China
- Party: Chinese Communist Party
- Education: Advanced Vocational School of the People's Liberation Army Navy

Military service
- Allegiance: People's Republic of China
- Branch/service: People's Liberation Army Navy
- Years of service: 1956–2002
- Rank: Vice admiral

Chinese name
- Simplified Chinese: 王永国
- Traditional Chinese: 王永國
Transcriptions
Standard Mandarin
- Hanyu Pinyin: Wáng Yǒngguó

Wang Yongguo (Chinese: 王永国; November 1938 – 7 May 2026) was a vice admiral in the People's Liberation Army Navy (PLAN) of China who served as commander of the South Sea Fleet from 1994 to 2002. He was a representative of the 13th, 14th, and 15th National Congress of the Chinese Communist Party. He was a member of the 10th National Committee of the Chinese People's Political Consultative Conference.

== Biography ==
Wang was born in the town of Buliu, Rongcheng County, Shandong, in November 1938.

He enlisted in the People's Liberation Army (PLA) in January 1956, and served in the People's Liberation Army Navy (PLAN). In 1958, after the Second Taiwan Strait Crisis, he served in the coastal province Fujian. In March 1960, he enrolled at the Advanced Vocational School of the People's Liberation Army Navy, and graduated in September 1961. He joined the Chinese Communist Party (CCP) at the same year. In November 1965, he served as the captain of the 126 torpedo boat squadron. He and his battle companion sank the Nationalist warship "Yongchang", wounded "Yongtai", and captured 9 enemies. As a result, he was personally honored with second-class merit.

Wang became deputy commander of the People's Liberation Army Navy Fujian Base in December 1976, rising to commander in August 1985. In July 1987, he was reassigned as commander of the People's Liberation Army Navy Zhoushan Base, and held that office until October 1991. Starting in 1992, he successively served as deputy commander of the East Sea Fleet and the North Sea Fleet. He was commissioned as deputy commander of the Guangzhou Military Region in November 1994, in addition to serving as commander of the South Sea Fleet. In August 1998, he led two marine corps with nearly 6,000 officers and soldiers to withstand the impact of the sixth, seventh, and eighth flood peaks of the Yangtze River, ruled out 15 major and minor risks, and successfully completed the flood control and rescue mission.

He was promoted to the rank of rear admiral (shaojiang) in August 1988 and to vice admiral (zhongjiang) in August 1996.

Wang died on 7 May 2026, at the age of 87.

Military offices
Preceded by Zhang Xianjun (张先军)	Commander of the People's Liberation Army Navy Fujian Base; 1985–1987	Succeeded by Niu Yushan
Preceded by Niu Yushan	Commander of the People's Liberation Army Navy Zhoushan Base; 1987–1991	Succeeded by Chen Bingju (陈秉巨)
Preceded by He Linzhong	Commander of the South Sea Fleet; 1994–2002	Succeeded by Wu Shengli
