= Lidao =

Lidao 俚岛镇 Litao
- Town
- Location in Shandong
- Coordinates: 37°13′29″N 122°34′57″E
- Country: People's Republic of China
- Province: Shandong
- Prefecture-level city: Weihai
- County-level city: Rongcheng
- Time zone: UTC+8 (China Standard)

Lidao (Chinese: 俚岛; pinyin: Lídǎo) is a town in Rongcheng City, Weihai, in eastern Shandong province, China. As of 2020, it administers Yingbo Residential Community (瀛波社区) and the following 71 villages:

- Lidao Village
- Yingxizhuang Village (英西庄村)
- Xiaojiang Village (小讲村)
- Guanjia Village (关家村)
- Zhuangshangsongjia Village (庄上宋家村)
- Dadingshan Village (大顶山村)
- Wolongwangjia Village (卧龙王家村)
- Zhongwodao Village (中我岛村)
- Beiwodao Village (北我岛村)
- Jinjiaogang Village (金角港村)
- Boxiya Village (泊西崖村)
- Nanzhengjia Village (南郑家村)
- Xiangjiazhai Village (项家寨村)
- Chenfengzhuang Village (陈冯庄村)
- Chujiabo Village (初家泊村)
- Shanhouwangjia Village (山后王家村)
- Qiaozigou Village (桥子沟村)
- Gouchenjia Village (沟陈家村)
- Guanshentun Village (关沈屯村)
- Zhangjiatun Village (张家屯村)
- Yangjiashan Village (杨家山村)
- Dongzhuang Village (东庄村)
- Dasujia Village (大苏家村)
- Datuanlijia Village (大疃李家村)
- Xiaotuanlijia Village (小疃李家村)
- Liujiaquan Village (刘家圈村)
- Nanhuayuan Village (南花园村)
- Beihuayuan Village (北花园村)
- Liangshuiquan Village (凉水泉村)
- Gongjiashan Village (宫家山村)
- Datuanlinjia Village (大疃林家村)
- Xiaotuanlinjia Village (小疃林家村)
- Qujiatai Village (曲家台村)
- Ximiaoyuan Village (西庙院村)
- Dongmiaoyuan Village (东庙院村)
- Guligaojia Village (古里高家村)
- Xiangshanqian Village (香山前村)
- Jinjiaokou Village (金角口村)
- Baiyundong Village (白云东村)
- Qianshentangkou Village (前神堂口村)
- Houshentangkou Village (后神堂口村)
- Donggu Village (东崮村)
- Xingbeitai Village (杏北台村)
- Xingnantai Village (杏南台村)
- Xingshipengzi Village (杏石硼子村)
- Xiaobo Village (小泊村)
- Xingchenjia Village (杏陈家村)
- Xingxiaoqiao Village (杏小桥村)
- Guojia Village (国家村)
- Yanbo Village (燕泊村)
- Beimadaohe Village (北马道河村)
- Cang'erya Village (苍耳崖村)
- Donglin Village (东林村)
- Xilin Village (西林村)
- Wangjiashan Village (王家山村)
- Shishandong Village (石山东村)
- Xilichabu Village (西利查埠村)
- Donglichabu Village (东利查埠村)
- Fenghuangya Village (凤凰崖村)
- Nanmadaohe Village (南马道河村)
- Dongyandun Village (东烟墩村)
- Houtuan Village (后疃村)
- Gouyazhangjia Village (沟崖张家村)
- Eshishan Village (峨石山村)
- Dazhuangxujia Village (大庄许家村)
- Wawushi Village (瓦屋石村)
- Nanwodao Village (南我岛村)
- Donggaojia Village (东高家村)
- Caodaozhai Village (草岛寨村)
- Yanjia Village (颜家村)
- Yandunjiao Village (烟墩角村)
