= Yaxi, Shandong =

Yaxi 崖西镇
- Town
- Location in Shandong
- Coordinates: 37°15′02″N 122°22′03″E
- Country: People's Republic of China
- Province: Shandong
- Prefecture-level city: Weihai
- County-level city: Rongcheng
- Time zone: UTC+8 (China Standard)

Yaxi (Chinese: 崖西; pinyin: Yáixī) is a town in Rongcheng City, Weihai, in eastern Shandong province, China. As of 2020, it administers the following 47 villages:

- Beiyaxi Village (北崖西村)
- Wolongdaijia Village (卧龙戴家村)
- Panjiagou Village (潘家沟村)
- Congjiazhuang Village (丛家庄村)
- Zhujiakuang Village (朱家夼村)
- Xiliu Village (西柳村)
- Beiliu Village (北柳村)
- Nanliu Village (南柳村)
- Lindaogou Village (林道沟村)
- Dongshuangding Village (东双顶村)
- Xishuangding Village (西双顶村)
- Wujia Village (五甲村)
- Wanmazhuang Village (万马庄村)
- Shipengzi Village (石硼子村)
- Daijia'an Village (戴家庵村)
- Qiaonantou Village (桥南头村)
- Songli Village (松里村)
- Xibuqian Village (西埠前村)
- Budongkuang Village (埠东夼村)
- Nanyaxi Village (南崖西村)
- Longchuang Village (龙床村)
- Beixinzhuang Village (北新庄村)
- Chejiazhuang Village (车家庄村)
- Linjiazhuang Village (林家庄村)
- Qian'an Village (前庵村)
- Shangguan Village (上观村)
- Hou'an Village (后庵村)
- Guanjia Village (管家村)
- Zhubu Village (朱埠村)
- Xiaoshankou Village (小山口村)
- Dashankou Village (大山口村)
- Shangzhuang Village (上庄村)
- Yahou Village (崖后村)
- Yuandong Village (院东村)
- Dahaopo Village (大蒿泊村)
- Shanhe Village (山河村)
- Xiaoliujia Village (小刘家村)
- Longfeng Village (隆峰村)
- Shanhelüjia Village (山河吕家村)
- Housuge Village (后苏格村)
- Xizang Village (西藏村)
- Zhuangshangwangjia Village (庄上王家村)
- Beiyuanzhuang Village (北苑庄村)
- Dongbuqian Village (东埠前村)
- Qiangaojiazhuang Village (前高家庄村)
- Hougaojiazhuang Village (后高家庄村)
- Zhanjiazhuang Village (詹家庄村)
