= Datuan, Shandong =

Datuan 大疃镇
- Town
- Location in Shandong
- Coordinates: 37°06′58″N 122°18′11″E
- Country: People's Republic of China
- Province: Shandong
- Prefecture-level city: Weihai
- County-level city: Rongcheng
- Time zone: UTC+8 (China Standard)

Datuan (Chinese: 大疃; pinyin: Dàtuǎn) is a town in Rongcheng City, Weihai, in eastern Shandong province, China. As of 2020, it administers the following 45 villages:

- Datuan Village
- Zhoujiazhuang Village (周家庄村)
- Chijiadian Village (迟家店村)
- Yuebozhuang Village (岳泊庄村)
- Liujiatun Village (柳家屯村)
- Nanshijiang Village (南石讲村)
- Danigou Village (大泥沟村)
- Xiaonigou Village (小泥沟村)
- Dawolong Village (大卧龙村)
- Dongtahou Village (东塔后村)
- Xitahou Village (西塔后村)
- Gushiwujia Village (孤石吴家村)
- Gushidujia Village (孤石杜家村)
- Huili Village (回里村)
- Donggounantuan Village (东沟南疃村)
- Donggoubeituan Village (东沟北疃村)
- Dongzhongyao Village (东中窑村)
- Xizhongyao Village (西中窑村)
- Yaoxijiang Village (窑西讲村)
- Gaojiazhuang Village (高家庄村)
- Zoushandong Village (邹山东村)
- Houtou Village (后头村)
- Huangzhuang Village (黄庄村)
- Dazhuji Village (大珠矶村)
- Zhuji Village (珠矶店村)
- Dongxujia Village (东徐家村)
- Xixujia Village (西徐家村)
- Xiahe Village (下河村)
- Shuangshiyujia Village (双石于家村)
- Shuangshidongjia Village (双石董家村)
- Jiangjiatun Village (姜家屯村)
- Shuangshizhoujia Village (双石周家村)
- Shuangshisunjia Village (双石孙家村)
- Shuangshiyinjia Village (双石尹家村)
- Hushantun Village (户山屯村)
- Songzhuang Village (诵庄村)
- Buluo Village (簿落村)
- Beilingchang Village (北岭长村)
- Nanwangzhuang Village (南旺庄村)
- Beiwangzhuang Village (北旺庄村)
- Hejiazhuang Village (贺家庄村)
- Sizhangxiangyang Village (四章向阳村)
- Wantou Village (湾头村)
- Donglingchang Village (东岭长村)
- Xilingchang Village (西岭长村)
