= Wang Maorun =

- 王茂润

Political Commissar of the PLA National Defence University
- In office July 1995 – July 2001
- President: Xing Shizhong
- Preceded by: Li Wenqing
- Succeeded by: Zhao Keming

Personal details
- Born: 6 May 1936 Rongcheng County, Shandong, China
- Died: 17 October 2008 (aged 72) Beijing, China
- Party: Chinese Communist Party
- Education: PLA Military Academy

Military service
- Allegiance: People's Republic of China
- Branch/service: People's Liberation Army Ground Force
- Years of service: 1951–2001
- Rank: General
- Unit: 67th Group Army
- Commands: Lanzhou Military Region

Chinese name
- Simplified Chinese: 王茂润
- Traditional Chinese: 王茂潤
Transcriptions
Standard Mandarin
- Hanyu Pinyin: Wáng Màorùn

Wang Maorun (Chinese: 王茂润; 6 May 1936 – 17 October 2008) was a general in the People's Liberation Army of China who served as political commissar of the PLA National Defence University between 1995 and 2001.

He was a representative of the 11th National Congress of the Chinese Communist Party, member of the 14th Central Commission for Discipline Inspection, member of the 15th Central Committee of the Chinese Communist Party, delegate to the 7th National People's Congress and a member of the Standing Committee of the 10th National People's Congress.

== Biography ==
Wang was born in the town of Moyedao (镆铘岛镇), Rongcheng County, Shandong, on 6 May 1936.

He enlisted in the People's Liberation Army (PLA) in May 1951, and joined the Chinese Communist Party (CCP) in July 1956. In 1964, he served in the 67th Group Army and stayed there for 16 years, interspersed with three years in Political Department of the Jinan Military Region from 1973 to 1976. In September 1983, he entered the PLA Military Academy, where he graduated in July 1985. He was transferred to the Lanzhou Military Region in June 1985 and appointed director of Political Department, and was promoted to deputy political commissar and secretary of its Commission for Discipline Inspection in April 1990. He was commissioned as political commissar of the PLA National Defence University in July 1995, and served until July 2001. In March 2003, he took office as a member of the National People's Congress Environment Protection and Resources Conservation Committee.

He was promoted to the rank of major general (shaojiang) in September 1988, lieutenant general (zhongjiang) in July 1993, and general (shangjiang) in March 1998.

On 17 October 2008, he died from an illness in Beijing, at the age of 72.

Military offices
Preceded by Pei Jiuzhou	Director of Political Department of the Lanzhou Military Region; 1985–1990	Succeeded by Kong Zhaowen
Preceded by Li Wenqing	Political Commissar of the PLA National Defence University; 1995–2001	Succeeded by Zhao Keming
