= Zhongtong =

Zhongtong may refer to the following:

== Present-day ==
People

- Gen. Sun Zhongtong (孙忠同; 1944–) of the People's Republic of China

Company

- Zhongtong Bus (中通客车, Zhōngtōng Kèchē), a Chinese bus company

Places

- Zhongtong Township (中童镇) in Jiangxi
- Zhongtong Street Subdistrict (中同街街道) in the Weibin District of Xinxiang, Henan

== Historical ==
- Zhongtong Era (中統, Zhōngtǒng), the era name of Kublai Khan of the Yuan Dynasty for the period 1260–1264
  - Zhongtong Emperor (中統帝, Zhōngtǒngdi), another name for Kublai Khan
  - Zhongtong notes, a form of jiaochao, the paper money of the Yuan Empire
- Gen. Xianyu Zhongtong (鲜于仲通; 8th century) of the Tang Dynasty
- Zhongtong (仲通), the style name of Wang Jing, an official of the Eastern Han dynasty
- Zhongtong (中統, Zhōngtǒng), the former nickname of the Central Bureau of Investigation and Statistics of the Republic of China
