= Yinzi =

Yinzi 荫子镇
- Town
- Location in Shandong
- Coordinates: 37°12′58″N 122°20′52″E
- Country: People's Republic of China
- Province: Shandong
- Prefecture-level city: Weihai
- District: Rongcheng
- Time zone: UTC+8 (China Standard)

Yinzi (Chinese: 荫子镇) is a town in Rongcheng City, Weihai, in eastern Shandong province, China.

== Geography ==
Yinzi is located in the eastern part of Shandong province, within Rongcheng City in Weihai prefecture.

== Administration ==
The town falls under the jurisdiction of Rongcheng City, which is part of Weihai prefecture-level city.
