= Walrus attack =

Attacks inflicted upon humans and other animals

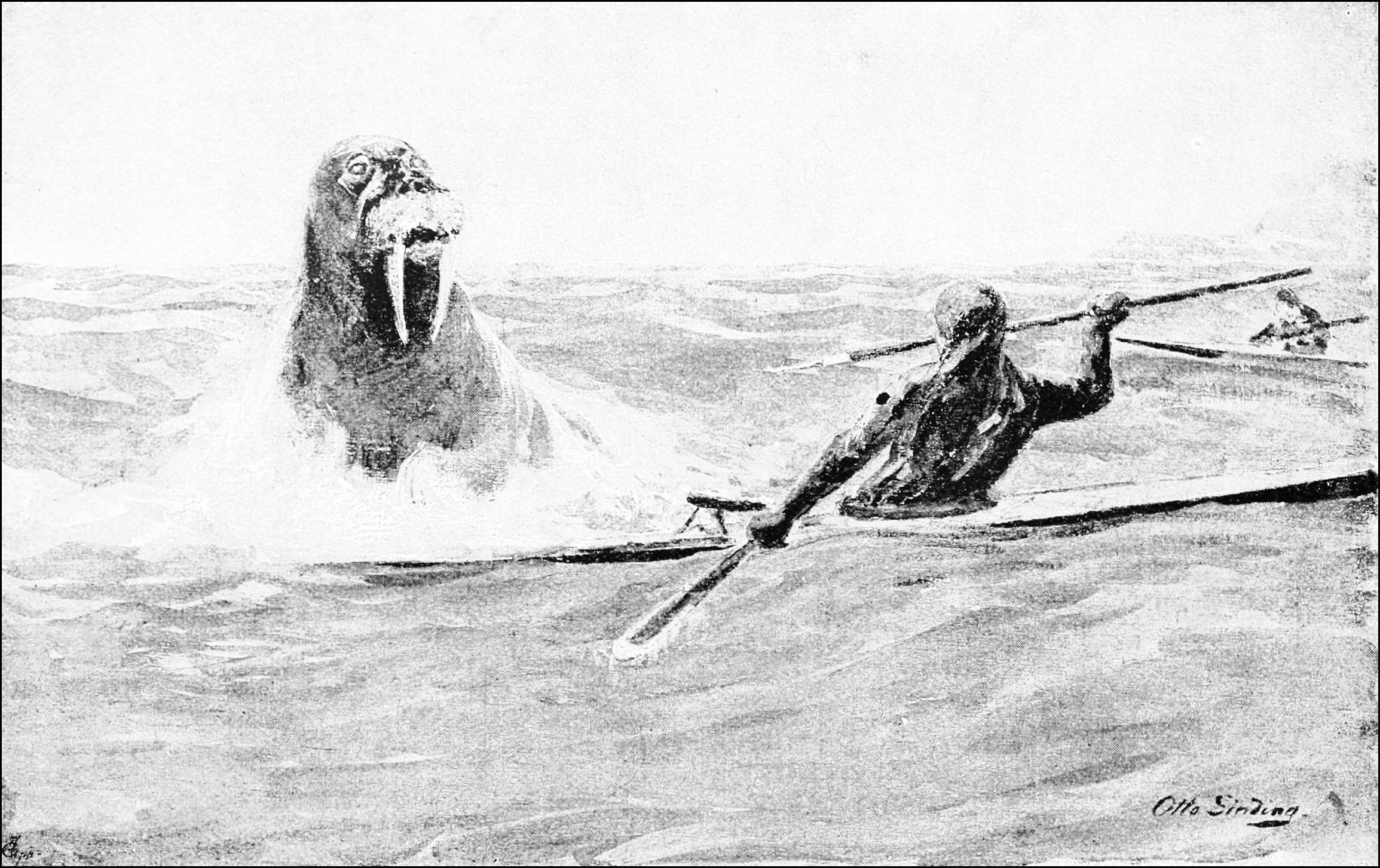
Man in kayak attacked by walrus (c. 1895), Popular Science Monthly, volume 46

Walrus attacks are attacks inflicted upon humans, other walruses and other animals by the walrus. They have been documented in the Arctic by the Inuit and by European explorers, both on land and at sea. The Greenland Inuit refer to the red walrus as saanniartoq, "the one who turns against one".

Walruses are most known to attack people in boats, and can cause serious harm with their tusks or by capsizing the boat or kayak. A 1918 memoir notes a case in Spitzbergen where walruses capsized a boat, killing all aboard. In 2012 adventurer Erik Boomer was nearly capsized when a walrus came up directly beneath his kayak; Boomer was able to fight the walrus off with his paddle. In 2019 a walrus capsized a Russian Navy scientific vessel that was approaching an arctic shoreline. The crew survived. In 2025, a walrus-related incident occurred during a guided sea-kayaking excursion near the island of Nordaustlandet in Svalbard. A walrus surfaced beneath a kayak and capsized it, causing the paddler to exit the vessel. The kayaker was rescued shortly afterward by guides using a nearby support boat. No injuries were reported.

While most walrus attacks occur in the water, there are accounts of a walrus breaking through the ice to attack hunters walking on it, and one account of a walrus launching itself from the water to chase hunters on the ice. In a 1960 case in Greenland, a hunter was pulling his kayak and seal out of the sea onto the ice, when a walrus emerged, stabbed him with a tusk (which did not kill him but knocked him unconscious) and escaped clutching the dead seal.

In 2016 at the Xixiakou Wildlife Park in Rongcheng city, a tourist named Jia Lijun and a zoo keeper were both killed after being pulled and held under water by a walrus. Jia Lijun is said to have been taking "selfies" with the walrus when he was grabbed from behind and pulled into the nearby water. The zoo keeper, who had been working with the walrus for over 10 years, jumped into the water to try to save Jia but was subsequently grabbed and drowned as well.
