= Xiazhuang, Weihai =

Xiazhuang 夏庄镇
- Town
- Location in Shandong
- Coordinates: 37°13′58″N 122°27′07″E
- Country: People's Republic of China
- Province: Shandong
- Prefecture-level city: Weihai
- District: Rongcheng
- Time zone: UTC+8 (China Standard)

Xiazhuang (Chinese: 夏庄镇) is a town in Rongcheng City, Weihai, in eastern Shandong province, China.
