= Fujian Naval Base =

People's Liberation Army Navy Fujian Base
- 中国人民解放军海军福建基地
- Emblem
- Founded: 4 October 1958; 68 years ago
- Country: China
- Allegiance: Chinese Communist Party
- Type: Navy base
- Role: Command and control
- Part of: People's Liberation Army
- Headquarters: Fuzhou, Fujian

Commanders
- Commander: Major general (shaojiang) Wang Zaijie
- Political Commisar: Major general (shaojiang) Zhai Yongyuan

Chinese name
- Simplified Chinese: 中国人民解放军海军福建基地
- Traditional Chinese: 中國人民解放軍海軍福建基地
Transcriptions
Standard Mandarin
- Hanyu Pinyin: Zhōngguó Rénmín Jiěfàngjūn Hǎijūn Fújiàn Jīdì

The People's Liberation Army Navy Fujian Base (Chinese: 中国人民解放军海军福建基地) is the naval base of the Eastern Theater Command Navy, located in Fuzhou, Fujian, China.

== History ==
In September 1949, the Naval Office of the East China Military Region in Fuzhou (华东军区海军驻福州办事处) was established, responsible for taking over the former Republic of China Navy offices and properties in both cities of Fuzhou and Xiamen, and registering former Republic of China Navy personnel. It is the predecessor of the People's Liberation Army Navy Fujian Base. In April 1951, the Naval Office of the East China Military Region in Fuzhou merged with the Army Xiamen Fortress Artillery Command (陆军厦门要塞炮兵指挥所) to form the Preparatory Office of the Xiamen Naval Base of the East China Military Region (华东军区海军厦门基地筹备处). In November 1953, the Preparatory Office of the Xiamen Naval Base of the East China Military Region was reorganized into the People's Liberation Army Navy Xiamen Marine Police District (中国人民解放军海军厦门水警区), which was under the jurisdiction of the East China Military Region Navy. On 4 October 1957, it was reshuffled as the People's Liberation Army Navy Fujian Base.

== Subordinate institutions ==
- Xiamen Marine Police District of the People's Liberation Army Navy
- Wenzhou Marine Police District of the People's Liberation Army Navy
- Shantou Marine Police District of the People's Liberation Army Navy

== List of leaders ==
=== Commanders ===
Name (English)	Name (Chinese)	Tenure begins	Tenure ends	Note
Zheng Yousheng	郑友生	November 1953	1955	
Du Biao	杜彪	February 1955	1958	
Gao Lizhong	高立忠	1958	1958	
Peng Deqing	彭德清	1958	1964	
Kang Liegong	康烈功	November 1964	October 1969	
zhang Xianjun	张先军	October 1969	August 1983	
Wang Yongguo	王永国	August 1983	1985	
Niu Yushan	牛玉山	August 1985	June 1990	
He Linzhong	何林忠	June 1990	January 1993	
Gao Yuanfa	高元发	1993	1993	
Yu Mingchu	于明初	1993	June 1995	
Xu Xinghe	徐兴和	June 1995	October 1997	
Wu Chenggong	吴成功	October 1997	December 1999	
Wang Laiyou	王来友	December 1999	December 2001	
Hu Xiangui	胡先贵	December 2001	December 2002	
Zhang Huachen	张华臣	December 2002	2007	
Shen Hao	沈浩	2007	December 2010	
Chen Lin	陈琳	2011	2014	
Li Hanjun	李汉军	2015	2015	
Wang Zaijie	王再杰	2015		

=== Political Commissars ===
Name (English)	Name (Chinese)	Tenure begins	Tenure ends	Note
Zheng Yousheng	郑友生	November 1953	December 1957	
Peng Deqing	彭德清	1958	1962	
Tan Tianzhe	谭天哲	March 1962	1963	
Zuo Ai	左爱	July 1963	July 1975	
Kang Liegong	康烈功	February 1969	October 1969	
Wang Junjie	王俊杰	May 1977	1983	
Li Shitian	李世田	August 1983	August 1985	
Li Jingwei	李景伟	August 1985	October 1992	
Huang Tiexu	黄铁须	October 1992	December 1996	
Zhao Rongtang	赵荣堂	December 1996	December 2000	
Tong Shiping	童世平	December 2000	June 2003	
Liu Gezhong	刘阁忠	June 2003	2007	
Li Jiangtan	厉江潭	2007	October 2012	
Chen Xianguo	陈显国	2012	December 2014	
Zhai Yongyuan	翟永远	December 2014		
