= Zhang Shengmin =

Chinese military officer (born 1958)

General Zhang Shengmin
- 张升民

Vice Chairman of the Central Military Commission
- Incumbent
- Assumed office Party Commission: 23 October 2025; State Commission: 28 October 2025
- Chairman: Xi Jinping
- Preceded by: He Weidong

Secretary of the Commission for Discipline Inspection of the Central Military Commission
- In office January 2017 – July 2026
- CMC Chairman: Xi Jinping
- Preceded by: Du Jincai
- Succeeded by: Zhang Shuguang

Personal details
- Born: August 1958 (age 68) Wugong County, Shaanxi, China
- Party: Chinese Communist Party

Military service
- Allegiance: Chinese Communist Party; People's Republic of China
- Branch/service: PLA Rocket Force; PLA Ground Force
- Years of service: 1978–present
- Rank: General
- Commands: Commission for Discipline Inspection of the Central Military Commission

Zhang Shengmin (Chinese: 张升民; born August 1958) is a general of the Chinese People's Liberation Army Rocket Force who is currently serving as the vice chairman of the Central Military Commission and a member of the 20th Politburo of the Chinese Communist Party.

Zhang joined the People's Liberation Army in 1978. He spent most his career as a political commissar in the Second Artillery Force (now the PLA Rocket Force). He served as the secretary of the Discipline Inspection Commission of the Central Military Commission from January 2017 to July 2026 and a regular member of the Central Military Commission from October 2017 to October 2025. He is also a Deputy Secretary of the Central Commission for Discipline Inspection, the top anti-corruption agency of the Chinese Communist Party (CCP).

== Career ==
Zhang Shengmin was born in 1958; his ancestral home is in Wugong County, Shaanxi Province. He enlisted to the People's Liberation Army (PLA) at the age of 19 in February 1978 and joined the Chinese Communist Party (CCP) in July 1979. After joining the army, he served as a soldier and staff officer in the 141st Division of the 47th Group Army, deputy director of the Political Research Office of the Political Department of the Lanzhou Military Region, and director of the Political Research Office of the General Political Department of the People's Liberation Army. He has a postgraduate degree from the Central Party School. In a 1989 book, Zhang argued that growing democratic sentiment within the PLA clashed with political education within the army. Later, Zhang called on for senior officials to limit their friendships and recognize that social interactions have political consequences.

Zhang Shengmin spent most his career as a political commissar in the Second Artillery Force (now the People's Liberation Army Rocket Force) In June 2004, he served as the director of the political department of unit 96301 of the Second Artillery Corps of the 55th Base in Huaihua, Hunan. In October 2008, he served as the political commissar of unit 96201 of the Second Artillery Corps of the 53rd Base in Kunming, Yunnan. In July 2009, he served as the political commissar of unit 96351 of the Second Artillery Corps of the 56th Base in Xining, Qinghai. China Central Television reported that in 2010, when he was posted at a military base in Northwest China, he led more than 1,000 troops in the reconstruction work immediately after the 2010 Yushu earthquake in Qinghai Province. It reported his unit helped to build emergency living quarters for the monks at the Changu Monastery (禅古寺), the largest Kagyu Tibetan Buddhist temple in Yushu Tibetan Autonomous Prefecture.

In June 2012, he served as the political commissar of the Second Artillery Force Command Academy. During his tenure, he introduced 16 measures to regulate what CCP cadres can say and said "A stern rebuke and calling someone out on the spot are actually the most direct, the most effective and the most responsible way to handle an issue". In September 2013, he served as the political commissar of a certain base of the Second Artillery Corps. In December 2014, he served as the director of the political department of the Second Artillery Corps. In November 2015, he was appointed as the first political commissar of the newly established Training and Administration Department of the Central Military Commission. In July 2016, he was appointed as the political commissar of the Logistics Support Department of the Central Military Commission and promoted to the rank of lieutenant general.

In January 2017, Zhang was appointed Secretary of Commission for Discipline Inspection of the Central Military Commission. He replaced General Du Jincai, who was closely associated with the former CMC vice-chairmen Guo Boxiong and Xu Caihou, both of whom had been investigated for corruption. During the 19th National Congress of the Chinese Communist Party in October 2017, Zhang was elected a member of the 19th Central Committee. He was also made one of the four members of the Central Military Commission and one of the eight deputy secretaries of the Central Commission for Discipline Inspection, which is in charge of investigating corruption by CCP members. A week later, on 2 November 2017, Zhang was promoted to the rank of general (shang jiang) by CMC chairman Xi Jinping. On 24 February 2018, he was elected as a representative to the 13th National People's Congress. During the 20th National Congress of the Chinese Communist Party in October 2022, Zhang was elected a member of the 20th Central Committee. He also was re-appointed as a deputy secretary of the CCDI and a member of the CMC. On 24 February 2023, he was re-elected as a representative to the 14th National People's Congress.

=== Vice Chairman of the Central Military Commission ===
On October 23, 2025, the CCP announced to elevate Zhang to the position of the Vice Chairman of the Central Military Commission of the Chinese Communist Party after the dismissal of his predecessor He Weidong. On 28 October 2025, he was appointed as the Vice Chairman of the Central Military Commission of the People's Republic of China by the Standing Committee of the National People's Congress. On July 3, 2026, newly promoted General Zhang Shuguang replaced him as Secretary of the Commission for Discipline Inspection Commission. On 29 October 2026, Zhang was promoted to the member of the 20th Politburo of the Chinese Communist Party. On 3 November 2026, Zhang met with Russian defense minister Andrey Belousov in Beijing, where he said the ties between China and Russia had reached "a new stage of greater achievement and faster development".

== Personal life ==
According to a 2008 article, Zhang is an accomplished calligrapher. He wrote a plaque for the Zengu Temple during the Yushu earthquake relief efforts in 2010. His love for calligraphy began with family influence. In his early years, he practiced the calligraphy of famous calligraphers such as Wang Xizhi and Wang Xianzhi of the Eastern Jin Dynasty. Later, during his military career and political work, he persisted in studying calligraphy and copied the works and inscriptions of calligraphers such as Sun Guoting, Huaisu, Mi Fu, Wang Duo, and Yu Yu-jen. His works have been recognized by calligraphy critics after they were published.

Order of precedence
Preceded by Yuan Jiajun as Member of the Politburo of the Chinese Communist Party	Order of precedence of China as Member of the Politburo of the Chinese Communist Party	Succeeded by Hu Jintao as Former General Secretary of the Chinese Communist Party
