= Tong Shiping =

Chinese politician and navy admiral

- 童世平

Secretary of the Commission for Discipline Inspection of the Central Military Commission
- In office September 2009 – November 2012
- Preceded by: Sun Zhongtong
- Succeeded by: Du Jincai

Political Commissar of the PLA National Defence University
- In office September 2007 – December 2009
- Preceded by: Zhao Keming
- Succeeded by: Liu Yazhou

Political Commissar of the South Sea Fleet
- In office June 2003 – December 2004
- Preceded by: Wu Huayang
- Succeeded by: Xu Yitian

Personal details
- Born: July 1947 (age 79) Shanghai, China
- Party: Chinese Communist Party
- Education: PLA National Defence University

Military service
- Allegiance: People's Republic of China
- Branch/service: People's Liberation Army Navy
- Years of service: 1966–2012
- Rank: General

Chinese name
- Chinese: 童世平
Transcriptions
Standard Mandarin
- Hanyu Pinyin: Tóng Shìpíng
Wu
- Wugniu: Don^{6} Sy^{5}-bin^{6}

Tong Shiping (Chinese: 童世平; pinyin: Tóng Shìpíng; born July 1947) is a retired admiral of the People's Liberation Army Navy (PLAN) of China. He served as Director of the Political Department of the PLAN, Political Commissar of the PLA National Defence University, and Head of the Commission for Discipline Inspection of the Central Military Commission. He was a member of the 17th Central Committee of the Chinese Communist Party.

== Biography ==
Tong was born in Shanghai in July 1947 and joined the PLA in 1968. He graduated from the PLA National Defence University. He attained the rank of rear admiral in July 1998, vice admiral in July 2004, and admiral in July 2010.

Military offices
Preceded by Zhao Rongtang	Political Commissar of the People's Liberation Army Navy Fujian Base; 2000–2003	Succeeded by Liu Gezhong
Preceded by Wu Huayang	Political Commissar of the South Sea Fleet; 2003–2004	Succeeded by Xu Yitian
Preceded by Zhao Keming	Political Commissar of the PLA National Defence University; 2007–2009	Succeeded by Liu Yazhou
Preceded by Sun Zhongtong	Secretary of the Commission for Discipline Inspection of the Central Military Commission; 2009–2012	Succeeded by Du Jincai
