= Du Jincai =

Chinese general

- 杜金才

Secretary of the Commission for Discipline Inspection of the Central Military Commission
- In office November 2012 – January 2017
- CMC Chairman CCDI Secretary: Xi Jinping; Wang Qishan
- Preceded by: Tong Shiping
- Succeeded by: Zhang Shengmin

Personal details
- Born: October 1952 (age 73–74) Jing County, Hebei, China
- Party: Chinese Communist Party
- Education: Xinjiang University; PLA National Defence University

Military service
- Allegiance: People's Republic of China
- Branch/service: People's Liberation Army Ground Force
- Years of service: 1969–2017
- Rank: General

Du Jincai (Chinese: 杜金才; pinyin: Dù Jīncái; born October 1952) is a retired general (shangjiang) of the People's Liberation Army who served as Secretary of the Commission for Discipline Inspection of the Central Military Commission. He was also Deputy Secretary of the Central Commission for Discipline Inspection (CCDI), and a member of the CCDI Standing Committee.

== Biography ==
Du was born in Jing County, Hebei. He joined the military in 1970. He later served as the deputy director of the Political Department of the Xinjiang Military Region, then promoted to the same position in the Lanzhou Military Region (one level higher). In July 2005 he became the political commissar of the 21st Group Army (under the Beijing Military Region) of the PLA. In December 2006, he became the head of the Political Department of the Chengdu Military Region, and a year later was named assistant to the chief of the Political Work Department. In December 2009, was he further promoted to deputy director of the General Political Department. He was awarded the rank of General in July 2012.

Du earned a series of promotions at the 18th National Congress of the Chinese Communist Party, becoming the head of discipline inspection in the military, overseeing the army's anti-corruption efforts, and concurrently the Deputy Secretary of the CCDI.

Du was a member of the 18th Central Committee of the Chinese Communist Party.

Military offices
Preceded by Tian Xiusi	Political Commissar of the 21st Group Army; 2005–2006	Succeeded by Liu Lei
Preceded by Hu Yongzhu	Director of the Political Department of the Chengdu Military Region; 2006–2007	Succeeded by Wu Changde
New title	Secretary of the Commission for Discipline Inspection of the Central Military Commission; 2016–2017	Succeeded by Zhang Shengmin
Party political offices
Preceded by Tong Shiping	Secretary of the Political and Legal Affairs Commission of the Central Military Commission; 2012–2016	Succeeded by Position revoked
Preceded by Tong Shiping	Secretary of the Discipline Inspection Committee of the Central Military Commission of the Chinese Communist Party; 2012–2016	Succeeded by Position revoked
