= Li Wenqing =

Chinese military personnel

- 李文卿

Political Commissar of the PLA National Defence University
- In office November 1992 – July 1995
- Preceded by: Zhang Zhen
- Succeeded by: Wang Maorun

Personal details
- Born: 16 May 1930 Muping County, Shandong, China
- Died: 14 June 2009 (aged 79) Beijing, China
- Party: Chinese Communist Party

Military service
- Allegiance: People's Republic of China
- Branch/service: People's Liberation Army Ground Force
- Years of service: 1948–1995
- Rank: General
- Battles/wars: Chinese Civil War; Korean War
- Awards: Order of Liberation (3rd Class; 1955)

Li Wenqing (Chinese: 李文卿; pinyin: Lǐ Wénqīng; 16 May 1930 – 14 June 2009) was a general in the People's Liberation Army of China who served as political commissar of the PLA National Defence University from 1992 to 1995.

He was a member of the 14th Central Committee of the Chinese Communist Party. He was a delegate to the 6th and 7th National People's Congress. He was a member of the Standing Committee of the 9th Chinese People's Political Consultative Conference.

== Biography ==
Li was born Li Yunxiu (李云岫; 李雲岫; Lǐ Yúnxiù) in Muping County (now Muping District of Yantai), Shandong, on 16 May 1930. He joined the Chinese Communist Party (CCP) in April 1947, and enlisted in the People's Liberation Army (PLA) in January 1948.

During the Chinese Civil War, Li served in the war and engaged in the Yanzhou campaign, Huaihai campaign, Yangtze River Crossing campaign, and Shanghai Campaign. In 1951, he was assigned to the 60th Army of the People's Volunteer Army and fight in the Chinese spring offensive, in which he witnessed the disastrous defeat of the 180th Division.

In 1955, Li was reassigned to the Nanjing Military Region, and before long he became a secretary for Commander Xu Shiyou. He was eventually promoted to deputy director of the Office of the Headquarters of the Nanjing Military Region in 1967. In 1973, he was transferred to the 60th Group Army, in which he received a promotion to political commissar in 1983. After the abolition of the 60th Group Army in June 1985, he was made director of the Political Department of the Shenyang Military Region, and was promoted to deputy political commissar in August 1988. He served as deputy political commissar of the PLA National Defence University in April 1990, and was promoted to political commissar position in October 1992.

He was promoted to the rank of lieutenant general (zhongjiang) in 1988 and general (shangjiang) in 1994.

On 14 June 2009, Li died from an illness in Beijing, at the age of 79.

== Work ==
- 近看许世友 [Look Closely at Xu Shiyou] (in Chinese). Beijing: PLA Literature and Art Publishing House. 2002. ISBN 9787503315244.

Military offices
Preceded by Zhang Zhen	Political Commissar of the PLA National Defence University; 1992–1995	Succeeded by Wang Maorun
