= Liu Nianguang =

- 刘念光

Political Commissioner of National University of Defense Technology
- Incumbent
- Assumed office July 2017
- Preceded by: Wang Jianwei

Director of Political Department of the Chengdu Military Region
- In office February 2014 – January 2016
- Preceded by: Chai Shaoliang
- Succeeded by: Position abolished

Personal details
- Born: December 1957 (age 68) Jingjiang, Jiangsu, China
- Party: Chinese Communist Party
- Education: Jianping County No.1 High School

Military service
- Allegiance: People's Republic of China
- Branch/service: People's Liberation Army Ground Force
- Years of service: 1974-present
- Rank: Lieutenant general

Chinese name
- Traditional Chinese: 劉念光
- Simplified Chinese: 刘念光
Transcriptions
Standard Mandarin
- Hanyu Pinyin: Liú Niànguāng

Liu Nianguang (Chinese: 刘念光; born December 1957) is a lieutenant general (zhongjiang) in the People's Liberation Army. He was promoted to the rank of major general (shaojiang) in July 2007 and lieutenant general (zhongjiang) in July 2015. He is the current Political Commissioner of National University of Defense Technology.

== Biography ==
Liu was born in Jingjiang, Jiangsu in December 1957. In 1974 he graduated from Jianping County No.1 High School. He enlisted in the People's Liberation Army (PLA) in December 1974. He served in the Shenyang Military Region for a long time. In 2006 he was promoted to become Director of Political Department of the 40th Group Army, a position he held until 2008. In February 2008 he became Deputy Political Commissioner of the 40th Group Army, ten months later he was promoted to become Political Commissioner. He was Director of Political Department of the Chengdu Military Region in December 2013, and held that office until January 2016. In July 2017 he was appointed Political Commissioner of National University of Defense Technology, replacing Wang Jianwei.

Military offices
Preceded by Chai Shaoliang (柴绍良)	Director of Political Department of the Chengdu Military Region; 2014–2016	Succeeded by Position abolished
Preceded by Wang Jianwei	Political Commissioner of National University of Defense Technology; 2017	Incumbent
