= Xu Yitian =

Chinese vice admiral

- 徐一天

Leader of Inspection Team, Central Military Commission to the Armed Police Force
- Incumbent
- Assumed office May 2016

Political Commissioner of National University of Defense Technology
- In office December 2005 – July 2010
- Preceded by: Huang Xianzhong
- Succeeded by: Wang Jianwei

Political Commissioner of South Sea Fleet
- In office December 2004 – December 2005
- Preceded by: Tong Shiping
- Succeeded by: Huang Jiaxiang

Personal details
- Born: 1947 (age 78–79) Republic of China
- Party: Chinese Communist Party
- Education: PLA Naval University of Engineering

Military service
- Allegiance: People's Republic of China
- Branch/service: People's Liberation Army Navy
- Years of service: –
- Rank: Vice Admiral

Xu Yitian (Chinese: 徐一天; pinyin: Xú Yītiān; born November 1947) is a vice admiral (zhongjiang) of the People's Liberation Army Navy (PLAN) of China. He attained the rank of rear admiral (shaojiang) in July 1999, and was promoted to the rank of vice admiral (zhongjiang) in July 2006.

== Biography ==
Xu was born in November 1947. He graduated from PLA Naval University of Engineering. After graduation, he served in the North Sea Fleet. In December 2004, he was appointed Political Commissioner of South Sea Fleet and Deputy Political Commissioner of Guangzhou Military Region, replacing Tong Shiping. He was Political Commissioner of National University of Defense Technology in December 2005, and held that office until July 2010. In May 2016, he was appointed Leader of Inspection Team, Central Military Commission to the Armed Police Force.

He was a member of the 13th Standing Committee of the Chinese People's Political Consultative Conference. He was an alternate of the 17th Central Committee of the Chinese Communist Party.

Military offices
Preceded by Tong Shiping	Political Commissioner of South Sea Fleet; 2004–2005	Succeeded by Huang Jiaxiang
Preceded by Huang Xianzhong	Political Commissioner of National University of Defense Technology; 2005–2010	Succeeded by Wang Jianwei
