= Zhang Shuguang (general) =

Chinese military officer

General Zhang Shuguang
- 张曙光

Secretary of the Discipline Inspection Commission of the Central Military Commission
- Incumbent
- Assumed office 3 July 2026
- CMC Chairman: Xi Jinping
- Preceded by: Zhang Shengmin

Personal details
- Born: 1964 (age 61–62)
- Party: Chinese Communist Party

Military service
- Allegiance: People's Republic of China
- Branch/service: People's Liberation Army Ground Force
- Years of service: ?–Present
- Rank: General
- Unit: People's Liberation Army Ground Force

Zhang Shuguang (Chinese: 张曙光) is a Chinese general in the People's Liberation Army Ground Force. He has served as Secretary of the Discipline Inspection Commission of the Central Military Commission and as Director of the Central Military Commission Supervisory Commission since 2026.

== Biography ==
Zhang previously served as Director of the Discipline Inspection and Supervision Bureau of the Discipline Inspection Commission of the Central Military Commission. In December 2021, he was promoted to Secretary of the Discipline Inspection Commission of the Ground Force and to the rank of lieutenant general.

On 3 July 2026, he was promoted to the rank of General and concurrently appointed Secretary of the Discipline Inspection Commission of the Central Military Commission and Director of the Central Military Commission Supervisory Commission.

Military offices
Preceded by Zhang Shengmin	Secretary of the Discipline Inspection Commission of the Central Military Commission; July 2026－	Incumbent
