= Chengshan =

Chengshan 成山镇
- Town
- Location in Shandong
- Coordinates: 37°21′46″N 122°32′51″E
- Country: People's Republic of China
- Province: Shandong
- Prefecture-level city: Weihai
- District: Rongcheng
- Time zone: UTC+8 (China Standard)

Chengshan (Chinese: 成山镇) is a town in Rongcheng City, Weihai, in eastern Shandong province, China.
