= Zhao Keming =

Chinese general

- 赵可铭

Political Commissar of the PLA National Defence University
- In office July 2001 – September 2007
- Preceded by: Wang Maorun
- Succeeded by: Tong Shiping

Personal details
- Born: October 1942 (age 83–84) Wuhan, Hubei, China
- Party: Chinese Communist Party
- Education: Shantou Education College

Military service
- Allegiance: People's Republic of China
- Branch/service: People's Liberation Army Ground Force
- Years of service: 1961–2007
- Rank: General

Chinese name
- Simplified Chinese: 赵可铭
- Traditional Chinese: 趙可銘
Transcriptions
Standard Mandarin
- Hanyu Pinyin: Zhào Kěmíng

Zhao Keming (Chinese: 赵可铭; born ) is a general in the People's Liberation Army of China. He was a representative of the 14th National Congress of the Chinese Communist Party, 16th National Congress of the Chinese Communist Party, and 17th National Congress of the Chinese Communist Party. He was a member of the 16th Central Committee of the Chinese Communist Party. He was a delegate to the 9th National People's Congress and a member of the Standing Committee of the 11th National People's Congress.

== Biography ==
Zhao was born in Wuhan, Hubei, in October 1942. He enlisted in the People's Liberation Army (PLA) in 1961, and joined the Chinese Communist Party (CCP) in the following year. He became a reporter of the People's Liberation Army Daily in 1980, and was dispatched to the Guangzhou Military Region in August 1985. He served as deputy head and then head of the Propaganda Division of the People's Liberation Army General Political Department in May 1988. He was appointed political commissar of the 47th Group Army in February 1995. In January 1996, he became deputy political commissar of the PLA National Defence University, rising to political commissar in July 2001. In March 2008, he took office as vice chairperson of the National People's Congress Financial and Economic Affairs Committee.

He was promoted to the rank of major general (shaojiang) in 1988, lieutenant general (zhongjiang) in 1998, and general (shangjiang) in 2004.

Military offices
Preceded by Wang Maorun	Political Commissar of the PLA National Defence University; 2001–2007	Succeeded by Tong Shiping
