= Discipline Inspection Commission of the Central Military Commission =

Chief military disciplinary authority of China

- 中央军委纪律检查委员会; Zhōngyāng Jūnwěi Jìlǜ Jiǎnchá Wěiyuánhuì

Agency overview
- Formed: 1955
- Type: Functional department of the Central Military Commission
- Jurisdiction: People's Liberation Army
- Headquarters: Ministry of National Defense compound ("August 1st Building"), Beijing
- Agency executive: Gen. Zhang Shuguang, Secretary
- Parent agency: Central Military Commission
- Website: chinamil.com.cn

Discipline Inspection Commission of the Central Military Commission
- Simplified Chinese: 中央军委纪律检查委员会
- Traditional Chinese: 中央軍委會紀律檢查委員會
Transcriptions
Standard Mandarin
- Hanyu Pinyin: Zhōngyāng Jūnwěi Guójì Jūnshì Hézuò Bàngōngshì

Abbreviated as
- Simplified Chinese: 中央军委纪委监委
- Traditional Chinese: 中央軍委紀委監委
Transcriptions
Standard Mandarin
- Hanyu Pinyin: Zhōngyāng Jūnwěi Jìwěi Jiānwěi

The Discipline Inspection Commission of the Central Military Commission is the top military disciplinary organ in the People's Republic of China. The CMCCDI has "dual responsibility" to the Central Commission for Discipline Inspection and the Central Military Commission. The membership of the CMCCDI is selected by the Central Military Commission.

== History ==
The first military organ in charge of enforcing discipline and control was established in 1955, but was dissolved during the Cultural Revolution. The modern incarnation of the CMCCDI was formed in January 1980 under the direction of the Central Committee of the Chinese Communist Party. Since 1990, the DICCMC's work has largely been carried out by the Political Work Department, the supreme political organ of the military. The head of the CMCDIC is customarily also the deputy chief of the General Political Department, and since the 16th National Congress of the Chinese Communist Party in 2002, concurrently a Deputy Secretary of the Central Commission for Discipline Inspection.

The CCDI has occasionally directly intervened in cases dealing with high-ranking officers in the People's Liberation Army. However, the direct involvement of the CCDI has only been cited in high-profile cases, such as those of Vice Admiral Wang Shouye in 2005, and Lt. General Gu Junshan in 2012. Usually, once the CMCCDI completes an investigation, the case is handed onto military prosecution authorities or to a court martial. Unlike CCDI cases, conclusions of which are generally publicly announced in the form of a press release, specific details about cases under the sole jurisdiction of the CMCCDI rarely appear on the public record. Occasionally, the CMCCDI will conduct the "initial investigation" into the purported wrongdoings of a military officer, and then hand over to the case to the CCDI for "further investigation".

== Heads ==
1. Marshal Luo Ronghuan (1955–1956)
2. Grand General Tan Zheng (1956–1961)
3. Marshal Luo Ronghuan (1961–1963)
4. General Xiao Hua (1964–1967)

Dissolved during the Cultural Revolution

1. Lieutenant General Gan Weihan (1980–1985)
2. General Guo Linxiang (1985–1990)
3. Lieutenant General Wang Ruilin (1990–1993)
4. General Zhou Ziyu (1993–2000)
5. General Xu Caihou (2000–2002)
6. General Zhang Shutian (2002–2004)
7. General Sun Zhongtong (2004–2009)
8. Admiral Tong Shiping (2009–2012)
9. General Du Jincai (2012–2017)
10. General Zhang Shengmin (2017–2026)
11. General Zhang Shuguang (2026–present)
