= Wu Changde =

Chinese general

- 吴昌德

Deputy Director of Political Work Department
- In office July 2011 – January 2017

Personal details
- Born: 1952 (age 73–74) Dayu County, Jiangxi, China
- Party: Chinese Communist Party
- Education: Fudan University

Military service
- Allegiance: People's Republic of China
- Branch/service: People's Liberation Army Ground Force
- Years of service: 1970–2017
- Rank: General

Wu Changde (simplified Chinese: 吴昌德; traditional Chinese: 吳德昌; pinyin: Wú Chāngdé; born 1952) is a retired general of the Chinese People's Liberation Army (PLA). He served as deputy director of the Political Work Department of the Central Military Commission from 2011 to 2017.

== Biography ==
Wu Changde was born in 1952 in Dayu County, Jiangxi. He joined the People's Liberation Army (PLA) in December 1970 and the Chinese Communist Party in 1972. He graduated from the Department of Philosophy of Fudan University in Shanghai.

Wu was appointed deputy director of the political department of the Nanjing Military Region from July 2003, and director of the political department of the Chengdu Military Region from June 2007. In July 2011, he became a deputy director of Political Work Department.

Wu Changde attained the rank of major general in 1997 and lieutenant general in 2008. On 31 July 2013, he was promoted to general (shangjiang), the highest rank for Chinese military officers in active service.

Wu was a member of the 18th Central Committee of the Chinese Communist Party (2012–2017).

Military offices
Preceded by Du Jincai	Director of the Political Department of the Chengdu Military Region; 2007–2011	Succeeded by Chai Shaoliang
