= Harbin University of Science and Technology =

Provincial public university in Harbin, Heilongjiang, China

Coordinates: 45.7141°N 126.6170°E

- 哈尔滨理工大学 (Chinese)
- Motto: 知行统一，博厚悠远
- Motto in English: Unity of knowledge Hiroatsu distant
- Type: Public Coeducational
- Established: 1950
- President: Zhou Hongli (周宏力)
- Faculty: 2,705
- Students: 33,496
- Location: Harbin, Heilongjiang, China
- Campus: Urban
- Website: www.hrbust.edu.cn

Chinese name
- Simplified Chinese: 哈尔滨理工大学
- Traditional Chinese: 哈爾濱理工大學
Transcriptions
Standard Mandarin
- Hanyu Pinyin: Hā'ěrbīn Lǐgōng Dàxué

The Harbin University of Science and Technology (HRBUST; Chinese: 哈尔滨理工大学) is a provincial public university in Harbin, Heilongjiang, China. The university is affiliated with the Province of Heilongjiang, and co-sponsored by the provincial government and SASTIND.

The university was established in 1995 by the merger of Harbin Science and Technology University, Harbin Electrical Engineering College, and Harbin Industrial Higher Vocational School.

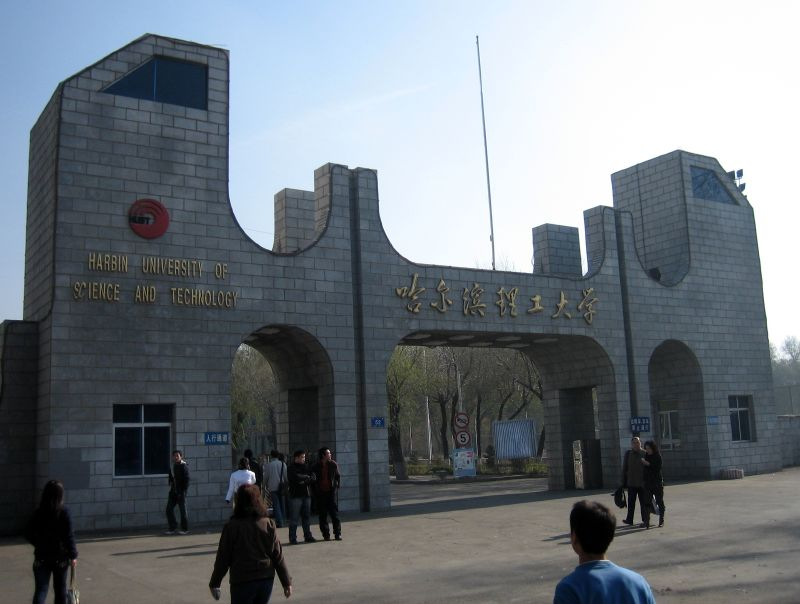
Main gate of Harbin University of Science and Technology

It has four campuses: East Campus, West Campus, South Campus, and North Campus in three districts: Daoli, Nangang, and Xiangfang, covering over 1,275,000 m^{2}, with a total building area of more than 850,000 m^{2}, its fixed assets being ¥1.032 billion RMB. Another campus is located in Rongcheng, Shandong. The library has a collection of 2.075 million books and about 4,900 Chinese and foreign journals and periodicals.
