= Sun Zhongtong =

Chinese general

- 孙忠同

Secretary of the Commission for Discipline Inspection of the Central Military Commission
- In office December 2004 – September 2009
- Preceded by: Zhang Shutian
- Succeeded by: Tong Shiping

Personal details
- Born: October 1944 (age 81–82) Wendeng, Shandong, China
- Party: Chinese Communist Party
- Education: Central Party School of the Chinese Communist Party

Military service
- Allegiance: People's Republic of China
- Branch/service: People's Liberation Army Ground Force
- Years of service: 1964–2009
- Rank: General

Chinese name
- Simplified Chinese: 孙忠同
- Traditional Chinese: 孫忠同
Transcriptions
Standard Mandarin
- Hanyu Pinyin: Sūn Zhōngtóng

Sun Zhongtong (Chinese: 孙忠同; born October 1944) is a retired general of the People's Liberation Army (PLA) of the People's Republic of China. He served as vice director of the PLA General Political Department.

== Biography ==
Born in Wendeng, Shandong, Sun entered the work force in September 1964, and joined the Chinese Communist Party (CCP) in September 1965. He graduated from the CCP Central Party School, majoring in economics management.

He enlisted in the army in January 1965, and served in various posts in the Liaoning Military District. He was elevated to vice director of the propaganda department of the PLA General Political Department in October 1990. In May 1993, he became editor-in-chief of the PLA Daily and president of the newspaper agency in September 1994. He became the assistant director of the General Political Department and a member of the CCP committee there in July 2001. He was elevated to vice director of the General Political Department in July 2004. In December of the same year, he was also appointed Secretary of the Commission for Discipline Inspection of the Central Military Commission.

He attained the rank of major general in July 1993, lieutenant general in July 2002, and full general in June 2006.

He was an alternate of the 16th Central Committee of the Chinese Communist Party and a full member of the 17th Central Committee.

Military offices
Preceded by Yang Zicai	Editor-in-chief of the People's Liberation Army Daily; 1993–1994	Succeeded by Yu Shunchang
Preceded by Xu Caihou	President of the People's Liberation Army Daily; 1994–2001	Succeeded by Zhang Zongyin
Party political offices
Preceded by Zhang Shutian	Secretary of the Commission for Discipline Inspection of the Central Military Commission; 2004–2009	Succeeded by Tong Shiping
