= Rongcheng, Shandong =

Rongcheng 荣成市 Jungcheng
- County-level city
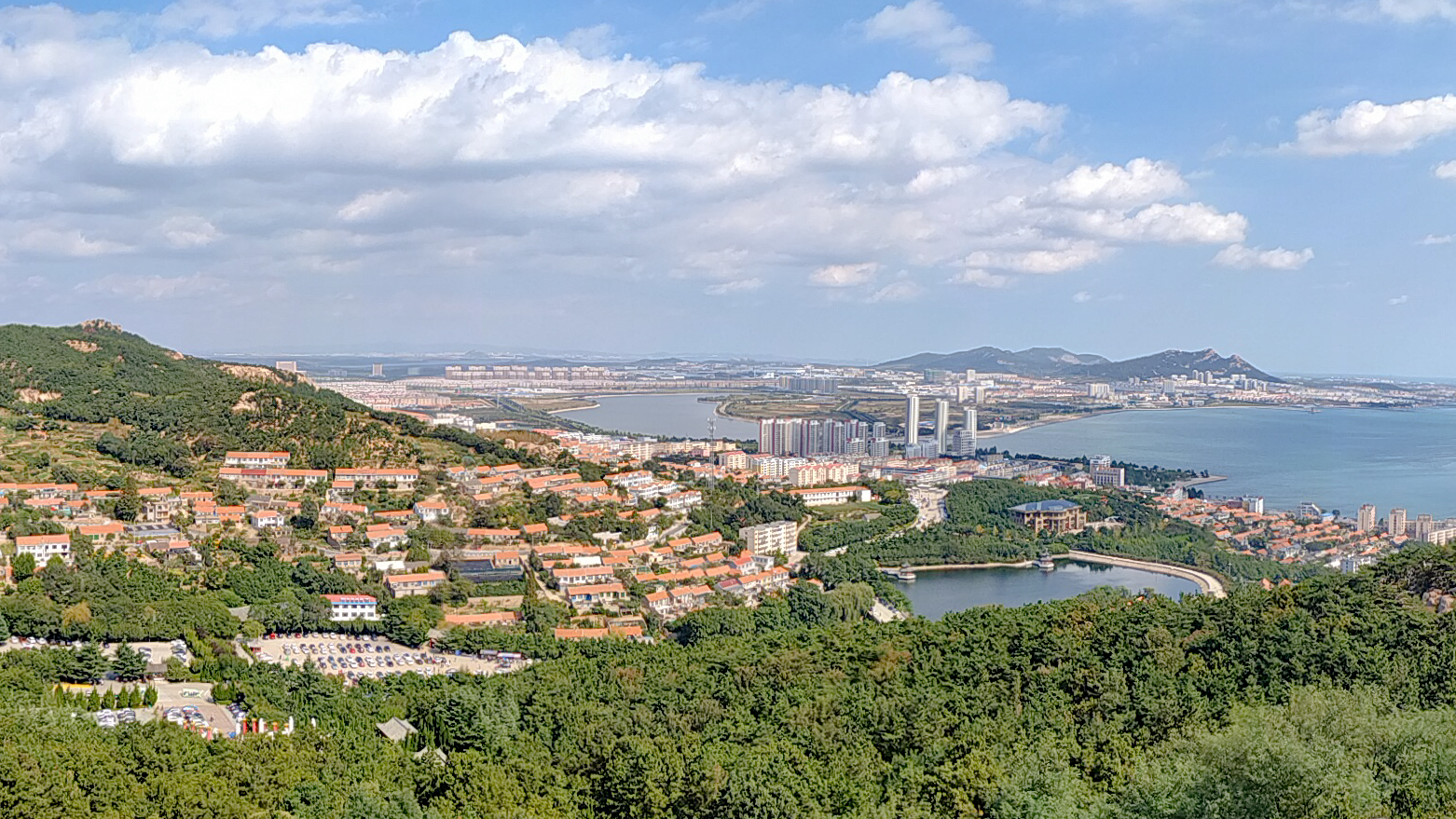
- View of Rongcheng on a hill

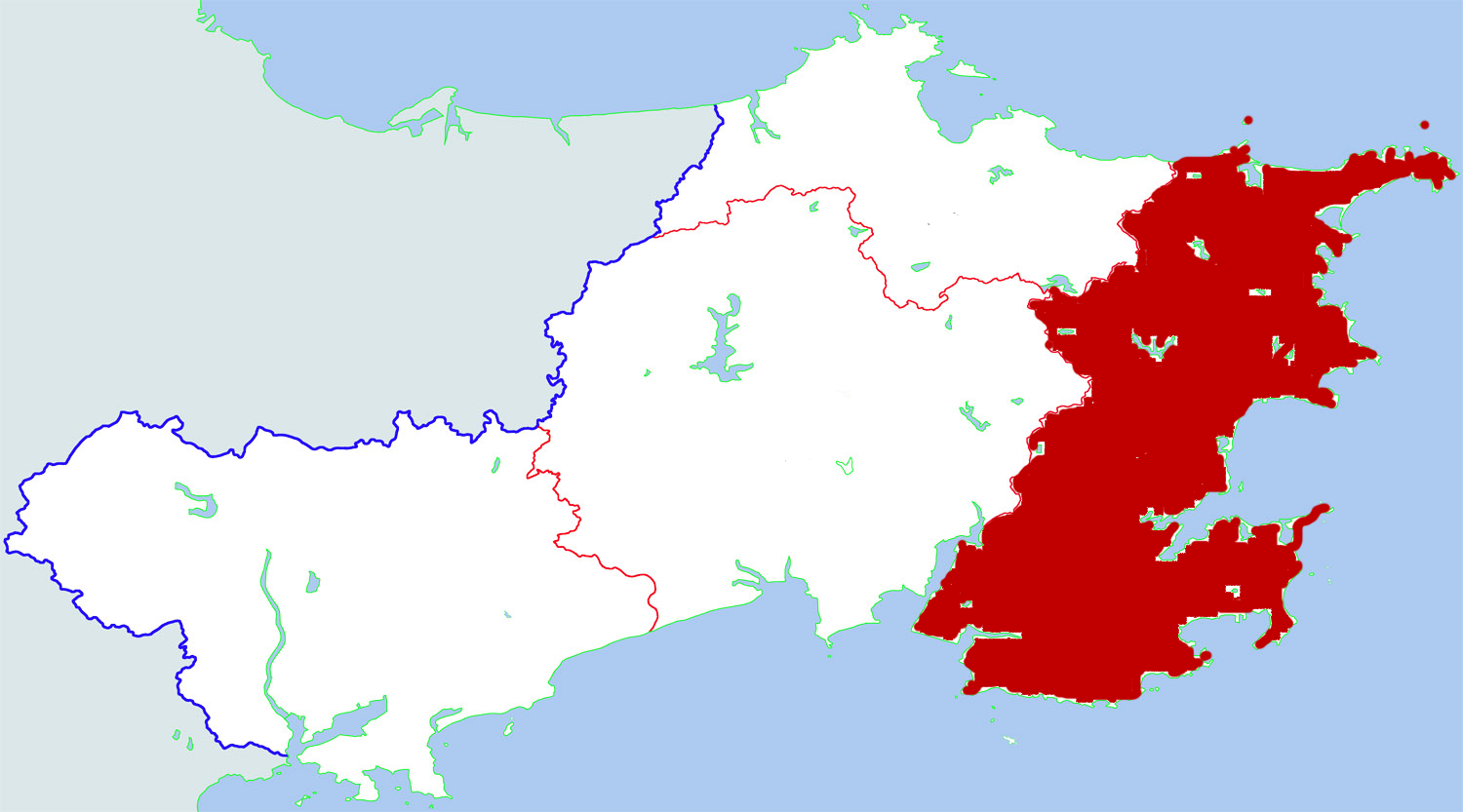
- Location in Weihai

- Location of the city center in Shandong
- Coordinates: 37°09′55″N 122°29′12″E
- Country: People's Republic of China
- Province: Shandong
- Prefecture-level city: Weihai

Area
  - Total: 1,526 km^{2} (589 sq mi)

Population (2019)
  - Total: 738,600
  - Density: 484.0/km^{2} (1,254/sq mi)
- Time zone: UTC+8 (China Standard)
- Postal code: 264300
- Area code: 0631

Rongcheng (simplified Chinese: 荣成; traditional Chinese: 榮成; pinyin: Róngchéng) is a county-level city of the prefecture-level city of Weihai, at the eastern extremity of the Shandong Peninsula in China.

== History ==
=== Ancient time ===
According to historical records, human settlements existed in Rongcheng as early as the Neolithic period. In ancient times, Rongcheng belonged to the territory of the Lai people and was governed by the State of Lai starting from the Shang dynasty. After the State of Lai was annexed by the State of Qi during the Conquest of Lai by Qi, the region became part of Qi's territory (in 567 BCE), and from then on, it fell under the control of the Central China. According to historical records, the First Emperor of the Qin dynasty had visited Rongcheng twice during his imperial tours, building bridges and temples.

=== Imperial time ===
In 201 BCE, the county of Buye (不夜) was established and placed under Donglai Commandery. The ruins of Buye County are located just south of Buye Village in Buliu Town, Rongcheng City, approximately 30 kilometers east of Chengshantou. During Northern Qi, in 568 CE, Wendeng County was established from parts of Muping and Guanyang counties, and the entire area of modern Rongcheng fell under the jurisdiction of Wendeng.

In the early Ming dynasty, to defend against external threats (mainly wokou pirates), two military garrisons—Chengshan and Jinghai—were established during Hongwu era (in 1380). These garrisons also managed civil affairs within their respective military zones, while areas outside the garrisons remained under the administration of Wendeng County.

During Yongzheng's reign (1735), the Chengshan Garrison was abolished and replaced with a county. Emperor Yongzheng named the new county "Rongcheng," noting that "Qin Shi Huang once shot a giant fish at Mount Rongcheng, which lies within this region." Thus, the name "Rongcheng County" came into official use.

=== In People's Republic ===
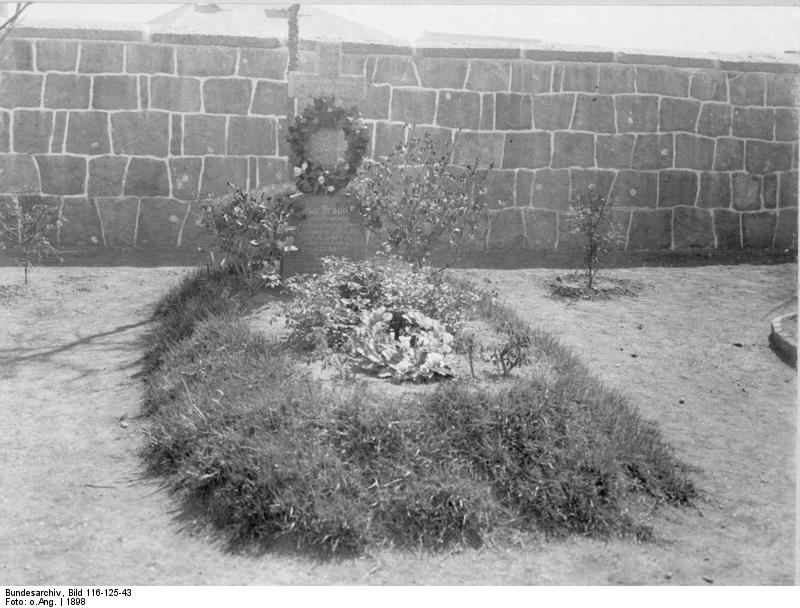
The German ship Iltis was sunk near Rongcheng on July 23, 1896, during a typhoon. Three men managed to swim ashore, and 11 survivors were rescued from the wreck two days later, apart from that, 71 men lost their lives. This is the tomb dedicated to the soldiers lost in the accident.

After the founding of the People's Republic of China, Rongcheng came under the administration of Wendeng District (文登专区), Shandong Province, in June 1950. In 1956, it was placed under Laiyang District; in 1958, it became part of Yantai District; and in 1987, it was transferred to Weihai City. In December 1988, with the approval of the State Council of China, Rongcheng was upgraded from a county to a county-level city under the jurisdiction of Weihai.

== Administration ==
There are 10 subdistricts and 12 towns under Rongcheng's administration.

Subdistricts

- Ningjin Subdistrict (宁津街道),
- Gangwan Subdistrict (港湾街道),
- Taoyuan Subdistrict (桃园街道),
- Wanglian Subdistrict (王连街道),
- Dongshan Subdistrict (东山街道),
- Chishan Subdistrict (斥山街道),
- Yatou Subdistrict (崖头街道),
- Chengxi Subdistrict (城西街道),
- Xunshan Subdistrict (寻山街道),
- Laoshan Subdistrict (崂山街道)

Towns

- Lidao (俚岛镇),
- Chengshan (成山镇),
- Buliu (埠柳镇),
- Gangxi (港西镇),
- Xiazhuang (夏庄镇),
- Yaxi (崖西镇),
- Yinzi (荫子镇),
- Tengjia (滕家镇),
- Datuan (大疃镇),
- Shangzhuang (上庄镇),
- Hushan (虎山镇),
- Renhe (人和镇)

== Transport ==
- China National Highway 309
- Shandong Provincial Highway 301
- Shandong Provincial Highway 908
- Rongcheng railway station

== Education ==
In 2024, Rongcheng had one institution of higher education, enrolling 1,630 students, graduating 1,805, with 7,175 students enrolled; one higher vocational college, enrolling 4,727, graduating 4,396, with 13,480 students enrolled; three general senior high schools, enrolling 2,825, graduating 2,642, with 8,428 students enrolled; 25 junior middle schools, enrolling 5,274, graduating 4,957, with 20,605 students enrolled; 21 primary schools, enrolling 4,941, graduating 5,186, with 28,431 students enrolled; two secondary vocational schools, enrolling 975, graduating 763, with 2,625 students enrolled; one special education school, enrolling 24, graduating 14, with 123 students enrolled; one Comprehensive Practical Activities Experimental School of Rongcheng City, with an annual training volume of 11,000 person-times; and 59 kindergartens, enrolling 2,421, graduating 4,899, with 10,383 children enrolled. It has two institutions of higher education: Harbin University of Science and Technology, Rongcheng, and Weihai Ocean Vocational College.

== Climate ==
Rongcheng has a humid continental climate, bordering a humid subtropical climate, with Chengshantou being a borderline Cwa with January's average monthly temperature at 0 °C (32 °F).

Climate data for Rongcheng, elevation 62 m (203 ft), (1991–2020 normals, extremes 1991–present)
Month	Jan	Feb	Mar	Apr	May	Jun	Jul	Aug	Sep	Oct	Nov	Dec	Year
Record high °C (°F)	12.6 (54.7)	18.5 (65.3)	24.6 (76.3)	29.8 (85.6)	34.2 (93.6)	35.5 (95.9)	35.7 (96.3)	35.6 (96.1)	34.0 (93.2)	28.4 (83.1)	23.2 (73.8)	15.8 (60.4)	35.7 (96.3)
Mean daily maximum °C (°F)	2.7 (36.9)	4.8 (40.6)	9.7 (49.5)	16.0 (60.8)	21.8 (71.2)	25.6 (78.1)	27.9 (82.2)	28.6 (83.5)	25.4 (77.7)	19.7 (67.5)	12.4 (54.3)	5.3 (41.5)	16.7 (62.0)
Daily mean °C (°F)	−1.3 (29.7)	0.3 (32.5)	4.8 (40.6)	10.9 (51.6)	16.7 (62.1)	21.2 (70.2)	24.4 (75.9)	25.0 (77.0)	21.2 (70.2)	15.1 (59.2)	7.9 (46.2)	1.2 (34.2)	12.3 (54.1)
Mean daily minimum °C (°F)	−4.5 (23.9)	−3.0 (26.6)	1.0 (33.8)	6.8 (44.2)	12.5 (54.5)	17.7 (63.9)	21.7 (71.1)	22.1 (71.8)	17.5 (63.5)	11.0 (51.8)	4.3 (39.7)	−2.0 (28.4)	8.8 (47.8)
Record low °C (°F)	−13.9 (7.0)	−12.8 (9.0)	−7.6 (18.3)	−4.4 (24.1)	4.9 (40.8)	9.6 (49.3)	15.6 (60.1)	13.5 (56.3)	8.6 (47.5)	0.1 (32.2)	−6.9 (19.6)	−13.9 (7.0)	−13.9 (7.0)
Average precipitation mm (inches)	11.8 (0.46)	15.4 (0.61)	19.1 (0.75)	46.1 (1.81)	63.9 (2.52)	71.2 (2.80)	186.6 (7.35)	171.1 (6.74)	77.6 (3.06)	30.2 (1.19)	33.2 (1.31)	24.5 (0.96)	750.7 (29.56)
Average precipitation days (≥ 0.1 mm)	5.5	4.2	4.2	5.7	7.4	7.7	12.3	9.8	6.9	5.6	6.2	7.4	82.9
Average snowy days	8.1	4.8	1.8	0.1	0	0	0	0	0	0.1	2.5	8.6	26
Average relative humidity (%)	68	66	64	64	70	79	87	84	75	69	70	70	72
Mean monthly sunshine hours	175.2	181.0	226.1	235.1	250.1	216.4	169.0	201.4	220.2	217.0	170.3	159.9	2,421.7
Percentage possible sunshine	57	59	61	59	57	49	38	48	60	63	56	54	55
Source: China Meteorological Administrationall-time August high

Climate data for Shidao Administrative District, Rongcheng, elevation 10 m (33 ft), (1991–2020 normals)
Month	Jan	Feb	Mar	Apr	May	Jun	Jul	Aug	Sep	Oct	Nov	Dec	Year
Record high °C (°F)	10.8 (51.4)	12.7 (54.9)	18.9 (66.0)	25.2 (77.4)	32.0 (89.6)	32.6 (90.7)	32.0 (89.6)	33.5 (92.3)	31.2 (88.2)	27.5 (81.5)	20.6 (69.1)	15.7 (60.3)	33.5 (92.3)
Mean daily maximum °C (°F)	3.1 (37.6)	4.7 (40.5)	8.8 (47.8)	14.2 (57.6)	19.7 (67.5)	23.2 (73.8)	26.2 (79.2)	27.6 (81.7)	24.9 (76.8)	19.7 (67.5)	12.7 (54.9)	5.9 (42.6)	15.9 (60.6)
Daily mean °C (°F)	−0.4 (31.3)	1.0 (33.8)	5.0 (41.0)	10.5 (50.9)	15.9 (60.6)	20.0 (68.0)	23.5 (74.3)	24.8 (76.6)	21.6 (70.9)	16.0 (60.8)	9.1 (48.4)	2.3 (36.1)	12.4 (54.4)
Mean daily minimum °C (°F)	−3.4 (25.9)	−2.1 (28.2)	1.9 (35.4)	7.2 (45.0)	12.6 (54.7)	17.2 (63.0)	21.1 (70.0)	22.3 (72.1)	18.5 (65.3)	12.4 (54.3)	5.7 (42.3)	−0.7 (30.7)	9.4 (48.9)
Record low °C (°F)	−12.3 (9.9)	−12.9 (8.8)	−5.6 (21.9)	−0.3 (31.5)	6.0 (42.8)	10.6 (51.1)	16.7 (62.1)	16.4 (61.5)	9.3 (48.7)	0.2 (32.4)	−5.3 (22.5)	−8.2 (17.2)	−12.9 (8.8)
Average precipitation mm (inches)	10.2 (0.40)	16.2 (0.64)	21.3 (0.84)	46.9 (1.85)	66.9 (2.63)	76.9 (3.03)	173.8 (6.84)	169.8 (6.69)	79.6 (3.13)	32.8 (1.29)	30.4 (1.20)	16.0 (0.63)	740.8 (29.17)
Average precipitation days (≥ 0.1 mm)	4.4	3.8	4.1	6.0	7.3	7.4	11.4	9.4	6.9	4.9	5.8	5.3	76.7
Average snowy days	6.8	3.8	1.4	0.1	0	0	0	0	0	0	1.6	6.7	20.4
Average relative humidity (%)	65	66	65	67	73	84	89	85	75	67	66	65	72
Mean monthly sunshine hours	188.0	185.8	227.7	227.1	241.7	199.5	161.0	206.4	220.4	223.0	178.5	179.7	2,438.8
Percentage possible sunshine	61	60	61	57	55	46	36	50	60	65	59	60	56
Source: China Meteorological Administrationall-time August high

Climate data for Chengshantou, Rongcheng, elevation 48 m (157 ft), (1991–2020 normals, extremes 1952–present)
Month	Jan	Feb	Mar	Apr	May	Jun	Jul	Aug	Sep	Oct	Nov	Dec	Year
Record high °C (°F)	11.8 (53.2)	16.2 (61.2)	25.2 (77.4)	24.3 (75.7)	29.2 (84.6)	31.4 (88.5)	32.0 (89.6)	33.5 (92.3)	31.7 (89.1)	27.6 (81.7)	22.2 (72.0)	16.7 (62.1)	33.5 (92.3)
Mean daily maximum °C (°F)	2.3 (36.1)	3.3 (37.9)	7.0 (44.6)	12.1 (53.8)	17.6 (63.7)	21.4 (70.5)	24.4 (75.9)	26.3 (79.3)	24.0 (75.2)	18.8 (65.8)	12.0 (53.6)	5.3 (41.5)	14.5 (58.2)
Daily mean °C (°F)	0.0 (32.0)	0.8 (33.4)	4.1 (39.4)	8.8 (47.8)	14.2 (57.6)	18.4 (65.1)	21.8 (71.2)	23.9 (75.0)	21.8 (71.2)	16.4 (61.5)	9.5 (49.1)	2.9 (37.2)	11.9 (53.4)
Mean daily minimum °C (°F)	−1.9 (28.6)	−1.2 (29.8)	1.9 (35.4)	6.5 (43.7)	11.4 (52.5)	15.9 (60.6)	19.6 (67.3)	21.9 (71.4)	19.8 (67.6)	14.4 (57.9)	7.3 (45.1)	0.8 (33.4)	9.7 (49.4)
Record low °C (°F)	−13.2 (8.2)	−15.7 (3.7)	−9.6 (14.7)	−2.6 (27.3)	2.4 (36.3)	8.7 (47.7)	13.8 (56.8)	16.0 (60.8)	10.4 (50.7)	−0.5 (31.1)	−7.3 (18.9)	−10.9 (12.4)	−15.7 (3.7)
Average precipitation mm (inches)	9.2 (0.36)	14.0 (0.55)	17.9 (0.70)	38.7 (1.52)	57.9 (2.28)	65.4 (2.57)	171.2 (6.74)	134.2 (5.28)	68.6 (2.70)	30.0 (1.18)	31.8 (1.25)	21.3 (0.84)	660.2 (25.97)
Average precipitation days (≥ 0.1 mm)	5.0	4.0	4.6	6.1	8.0	8.6	12.6	9.3	6.0	5.3	6.7	7.5	83.7
Average snowy days	8.9	4.9	1.7	0	0	0	0	0	0	0.1	2.6	8.7	26.9
Average relative humidity (%)	65	68	71	73	77	88	93	89	75	65	65	65	75
Mean monthly sunshine hours	172.2	185.5	230.9	231.5	245.2	203.3	162.0	216.3	230.6	219.8	166.8	146.9	2,411
Percentage possible sunshine	56	60	62	59	56	46	36	52	63	64	55	50	55
Source: China Meteorological Administration all-time extreme temperature
