= Weihai =

Weihai 威海市 Wé4iHæ
- Prefecture-level city
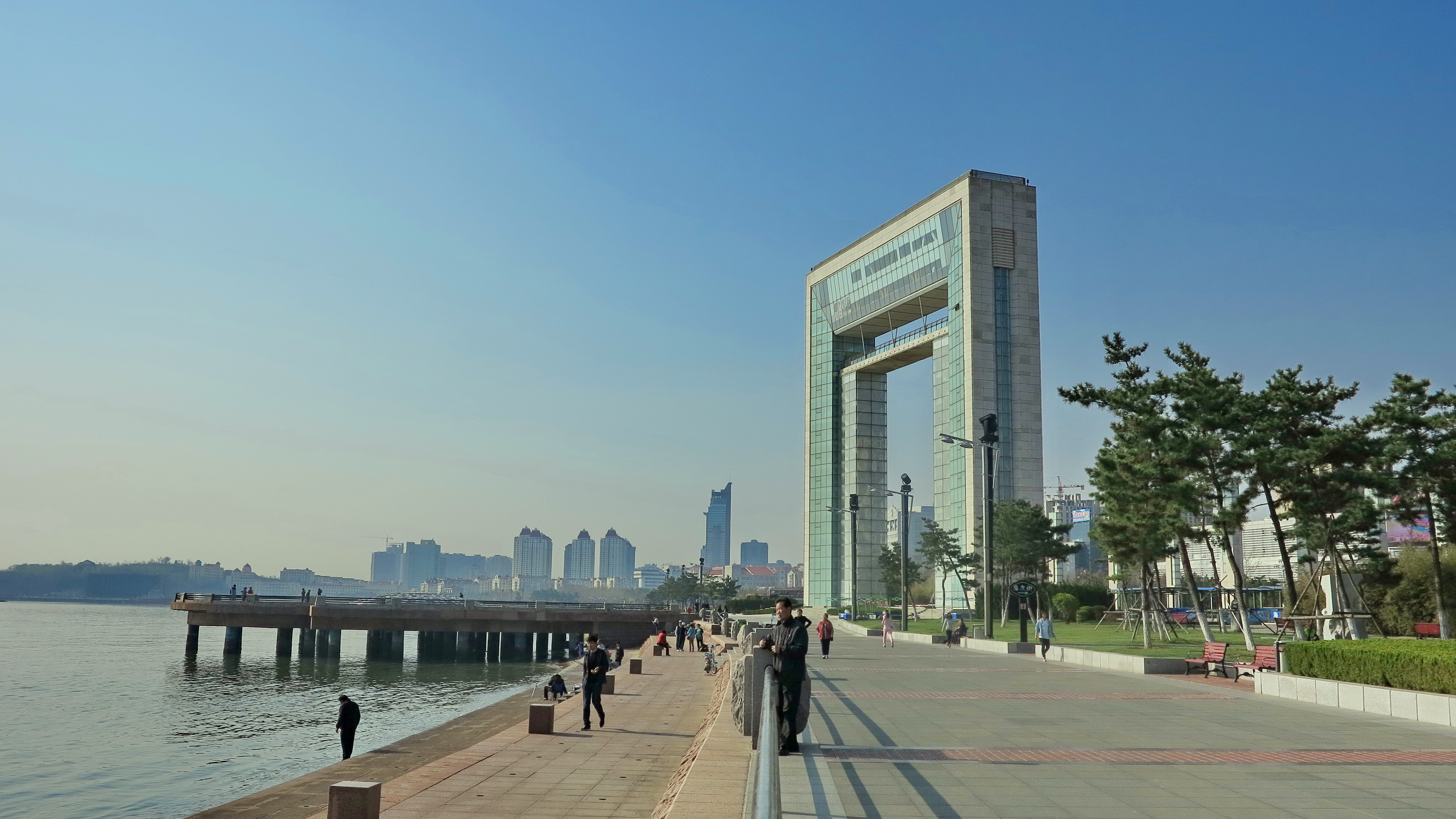
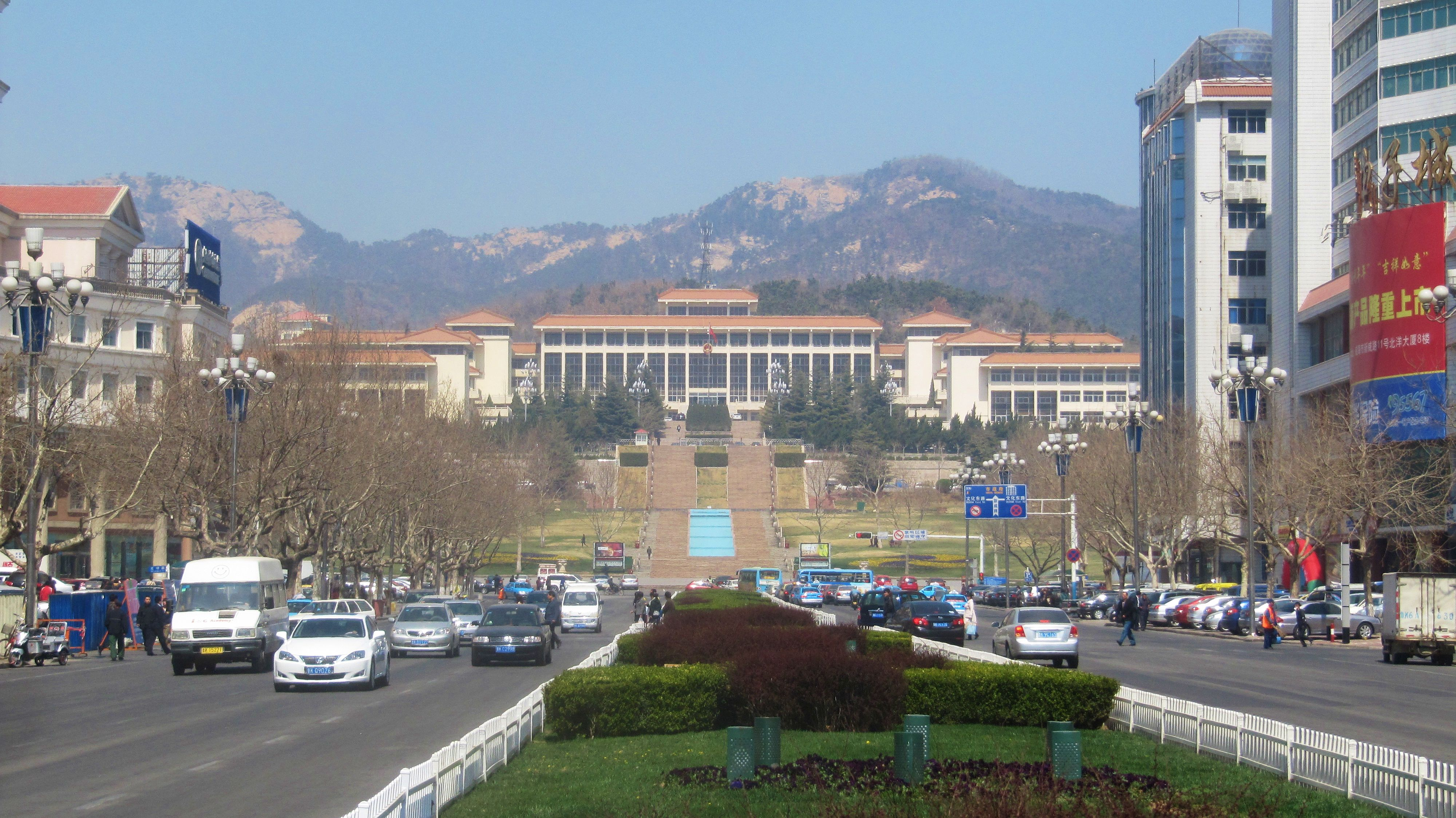
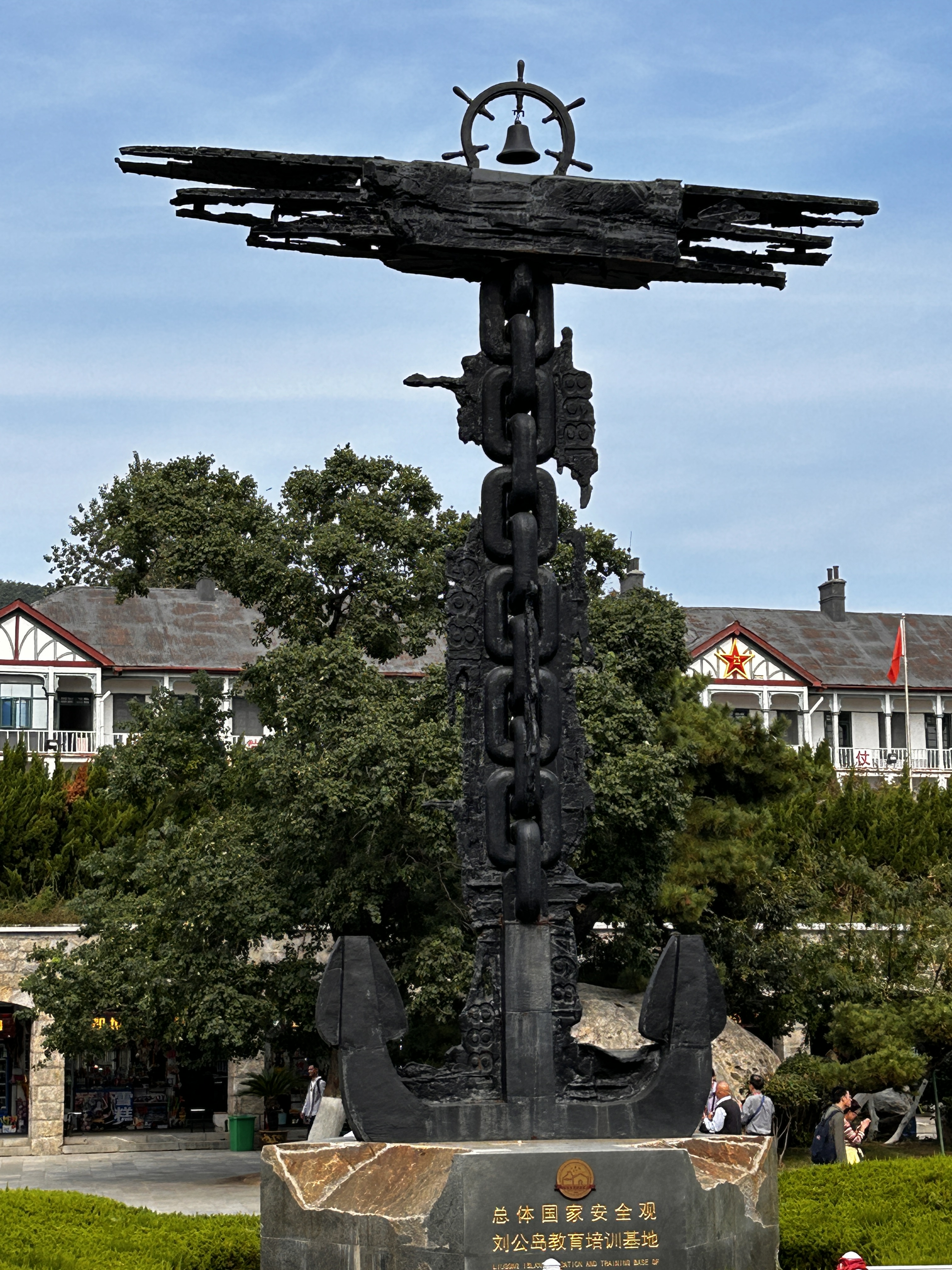
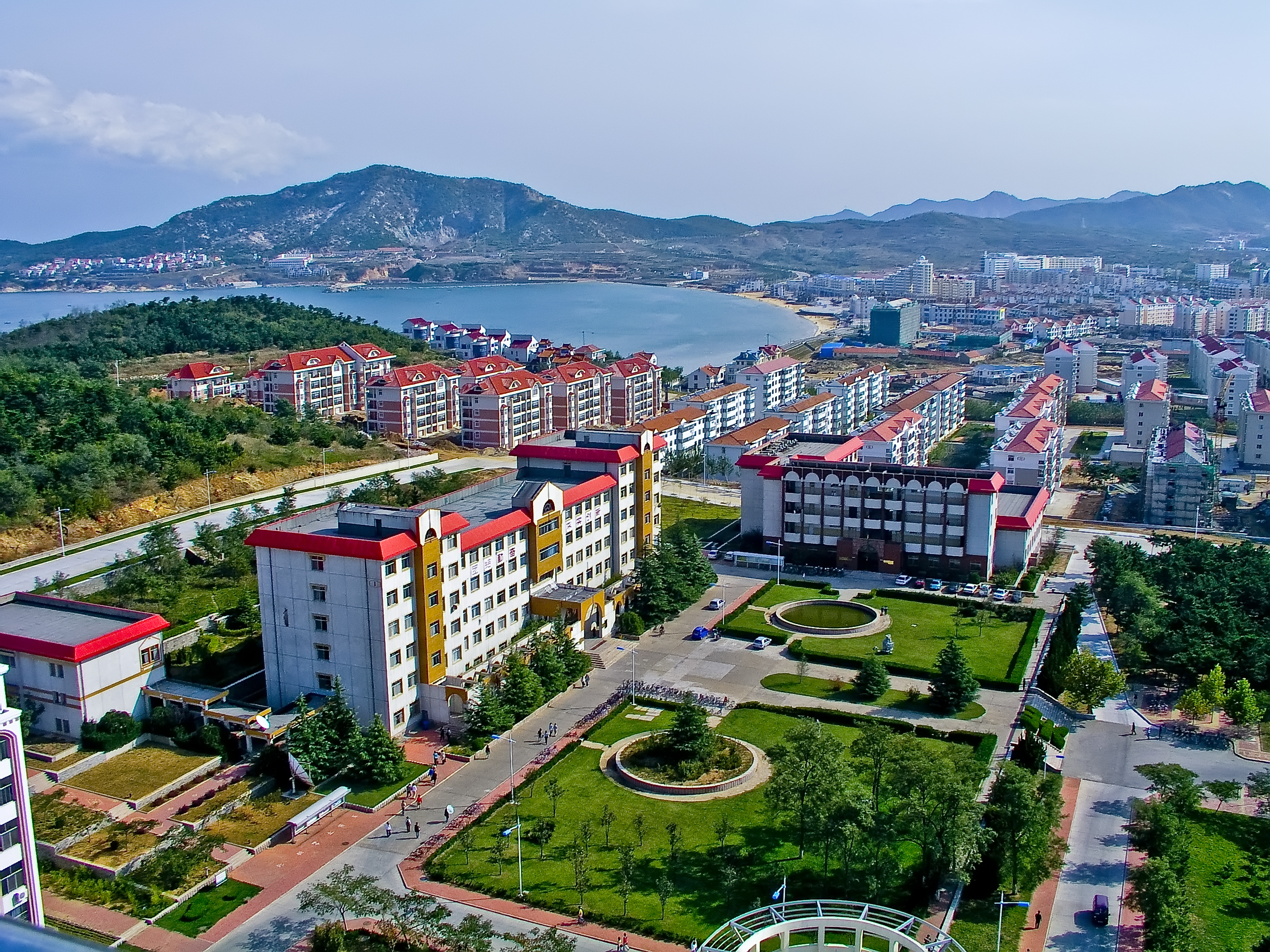
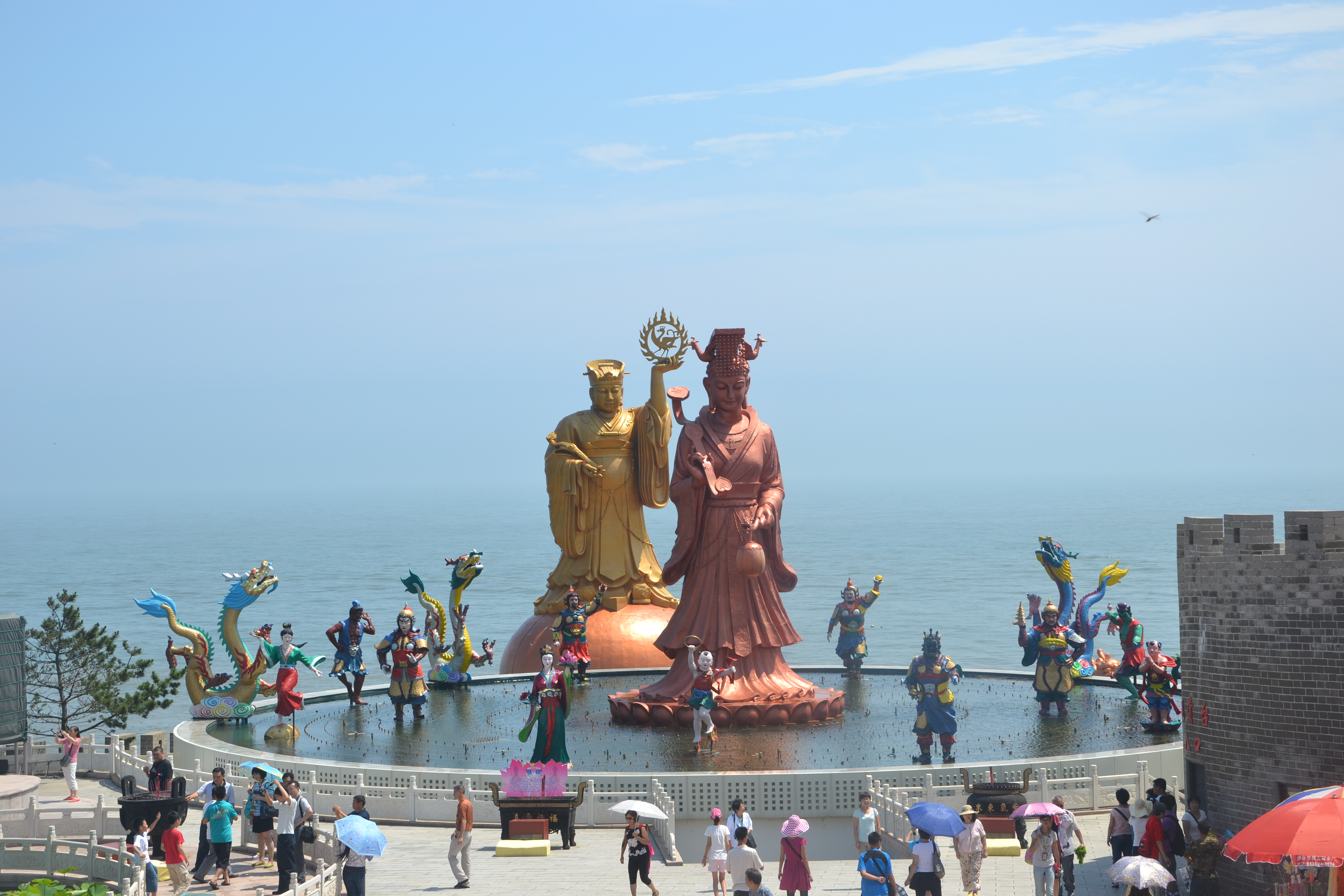
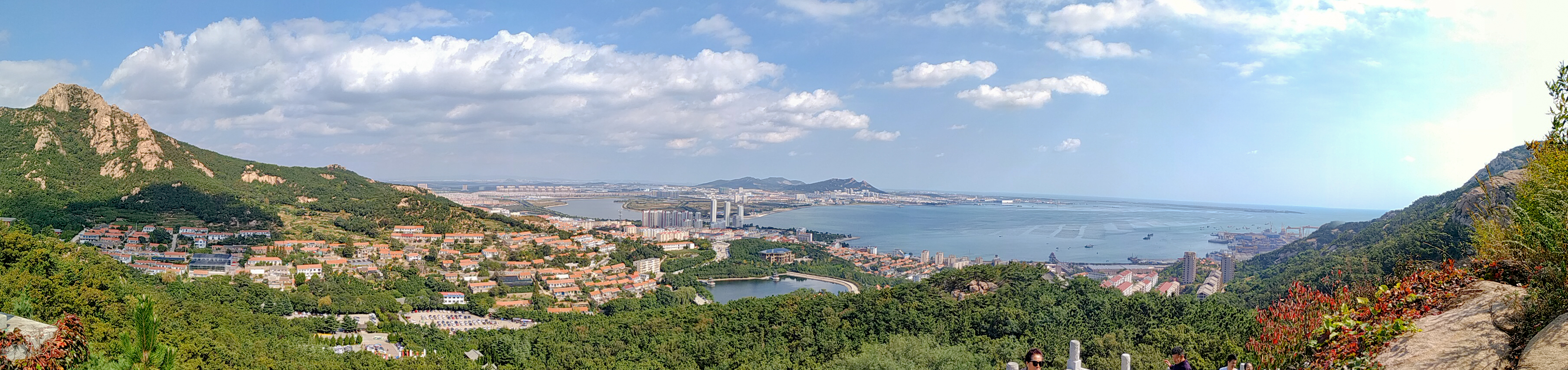
- Weihai skyline with the Gate of Happiness City hall of Weihai Liugong Island SDU Weihai Cape Chengshan Rongcheng

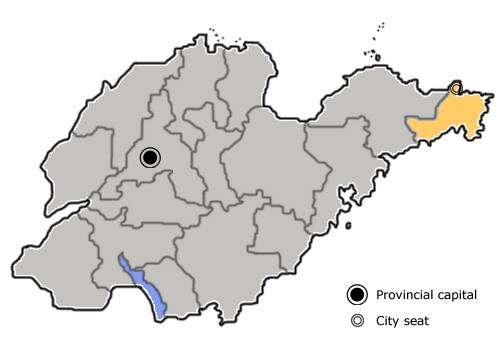
- Weihai City in Shandong

- Location in China
- Coordinates (Weihai municipal government): 37°30′48″N 122°07′14″E
- Country: People's Republic of China
- Province: Shandong
- County-level divisions: 4
- Township-level divisions: 66
- Municipal seat: Huancui District

Government
  - CCP Secretary: Yan Jianbo (闫剑波)
  - Mayor: Kong Fanping (孔凡萍)

Area
  - Prefecture-level city: 5,956 km^{2} (2,300 sq mi)
  - Water: 15.98 km^{2} (6.17 sq mi) 0.2756%
  - Urban: 2,605.9 km^{2} (1,006.1 sq mi)
  - Metro: 776.7 km^{2} (299.9 sq mi)
- Elevation: 44 m (145 ft)
- Highest elevation: 418 m (1,371 ft)
- Lowest elevation: 0 m (0 ft)

Population (2020 census)
  - Prefecture-level city: 2,906,548
  - Density: 488.0/km^{2} (1,264/sq mi)
  - Urban: 1,728,259
  - Urban density: 663.21/km^{2} (1,717.7/sq mi)
  - Metro: 1,164,730
  - Metro density: 1,500/km^{2} (3,884/sq mi)

GDP
  - Prefecture-level city: CN¥ 364 billion US$ 55 billion
  - Per capita: CN¥ 128,774; US$ 19,460
- Time zone: UTC+08:00 (China Standard)
- Postal code: 264200
- Area code: 631
- ISO 3166 code: CN-SD-10
- License Plate Prefix: 鲁K
- Administrative division code: 371000
- Website: www.weihai.gov.cn
- City Flower: Sweet Osmanthus, Osmanthus fragrans City Tree: Silk Tree, Albizia julibrissin

Weihai (Weihainese: Wé4iHæ, [ʋeɪ̯˥˩ hɛ̆꜌]; Chinese: 威海; pinyin: Wēihǎi), formerly Weihaiwei (Chinese: 威海卫; pinyin: Wēihǎiwèi; lit. 'Mighty Sea Fort'), is a prefecture-level city and major seaport city in the easternmost Shandong province of China. It borders Yantai to the west and the Yellow Sea to the east, and is the closest mainland Chinese city to South Korea (specifically, Chengshan to Yeonpyeongdo).

Compared with the 2,804,771 people in the 2010 Chinese census, there has been a total increase of 101,777 people over the past decade, an increase of 3.63%, with an average annual growth rate of 0.36%. Weihai's population was 2,906,548 as of the 2020 Chinese census, of whom 1,164,730 lived in the current built-up (or metro) area of (Huancui District) even though Wendeng district to the south with 563,529 inhabitants is soon being conurbated. There are two county-level cities within Weihai; Rongcheng had a built up area with 714,211 inhabitants, while Rushan had 464,078 inhabitants in 2020.

== History ==
=== Imperial era ===
Prehistorically, it was inhabited by Dongyi tribes, and it was annexed into China proper by the state of Qi in 567 B.C.

In 221 BCE, during Qin Shi Huang's reign, he implemented the commandery-county system in former six-country area. The area of the present-day city first belonged to Qi Commandery and later to Jiaodong Commandery, under the jurisdiction of Chui County. The Records of the Grand Historian records: In the 28th year, the First Emperor traveled east to inspect the commanderies and counties." In Han dynasty, it was under Donglai Commandery.

Before the 14th century, Weihai was a minor fishing settlement. In 1398, it became a military stronghold (wei), under the name Weihaiwei, to defend against raids by pirates. The fortification at Weihai was constructed in 1403, and contained walls almost 2 miles (3.2 km) in circumference.

During the Ming dynasty, the area was part of Deng Prefecture under the Shandong Provincial Administration, with two counties established: Wendeng and Rongcheng. In 1735, Chengshan Garrison was abolished and reorganized as Rongcheng County, with its seat located at present-day Chengshanwei in Rongcheng City, under the jurisdiction of Deng Prefecture. At the same time, Weihai and Jinghai Garrisons were abolished and incorporated into Wendeng County. In 1895, the Japanese occupied it in the Battle of Weihaiwei. The Japanese then returned Weihaiwei to China on 24 May 1898, after which it was occupied by the British.

=== British Weihaiwei ===
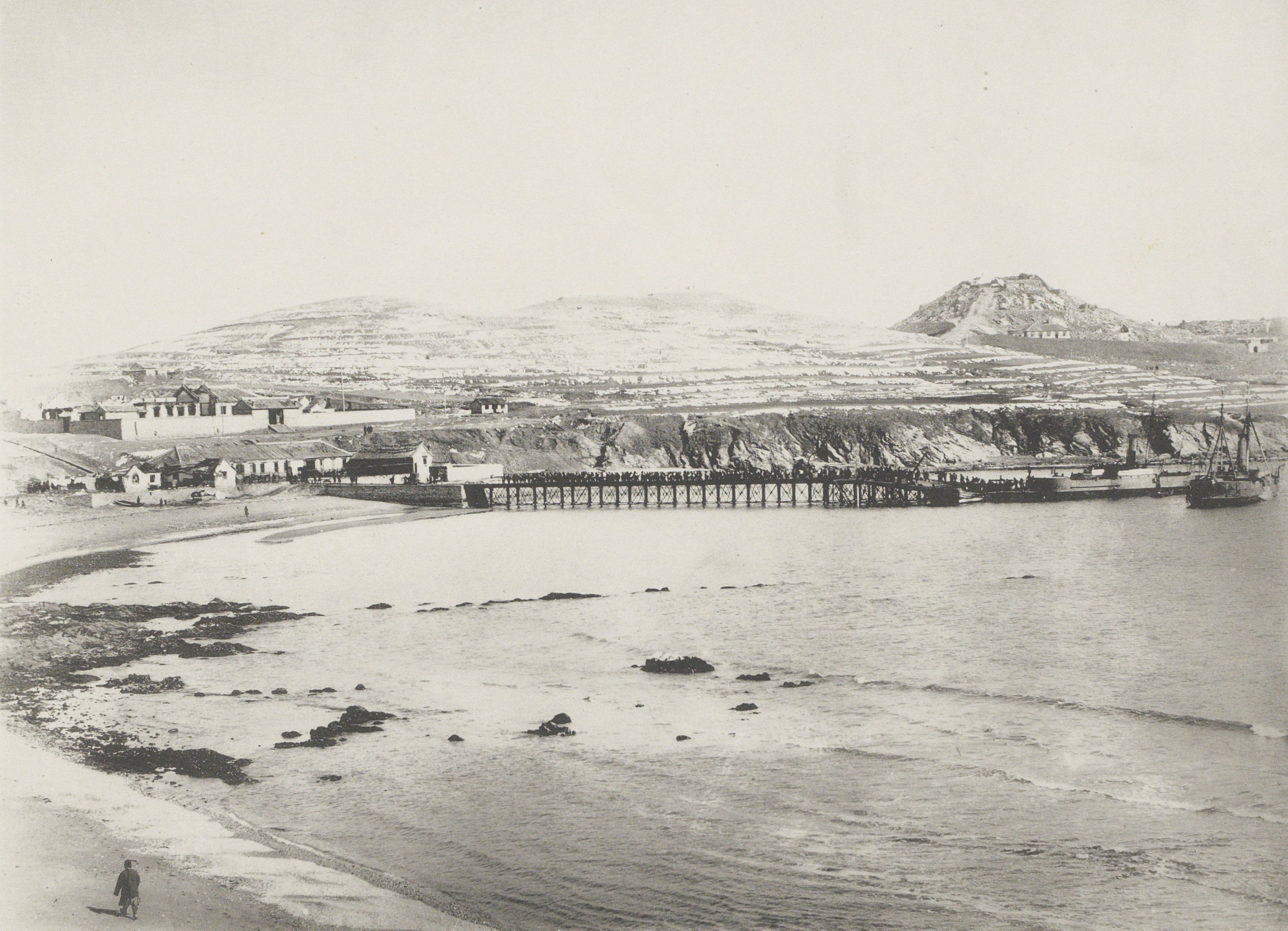
Landing of Chinese prisoners at Wei-Hai on 16 February 1895

The core of Weihai (now Huancui District) was ruled by the British from 1 July 1898 to 1930 under a lease agreement with the Chinese empire, with Port Edward (the center of the original Weihai city, now in Huancui District) serving as the capital. A Royal Navy base was built on Liugong Island.

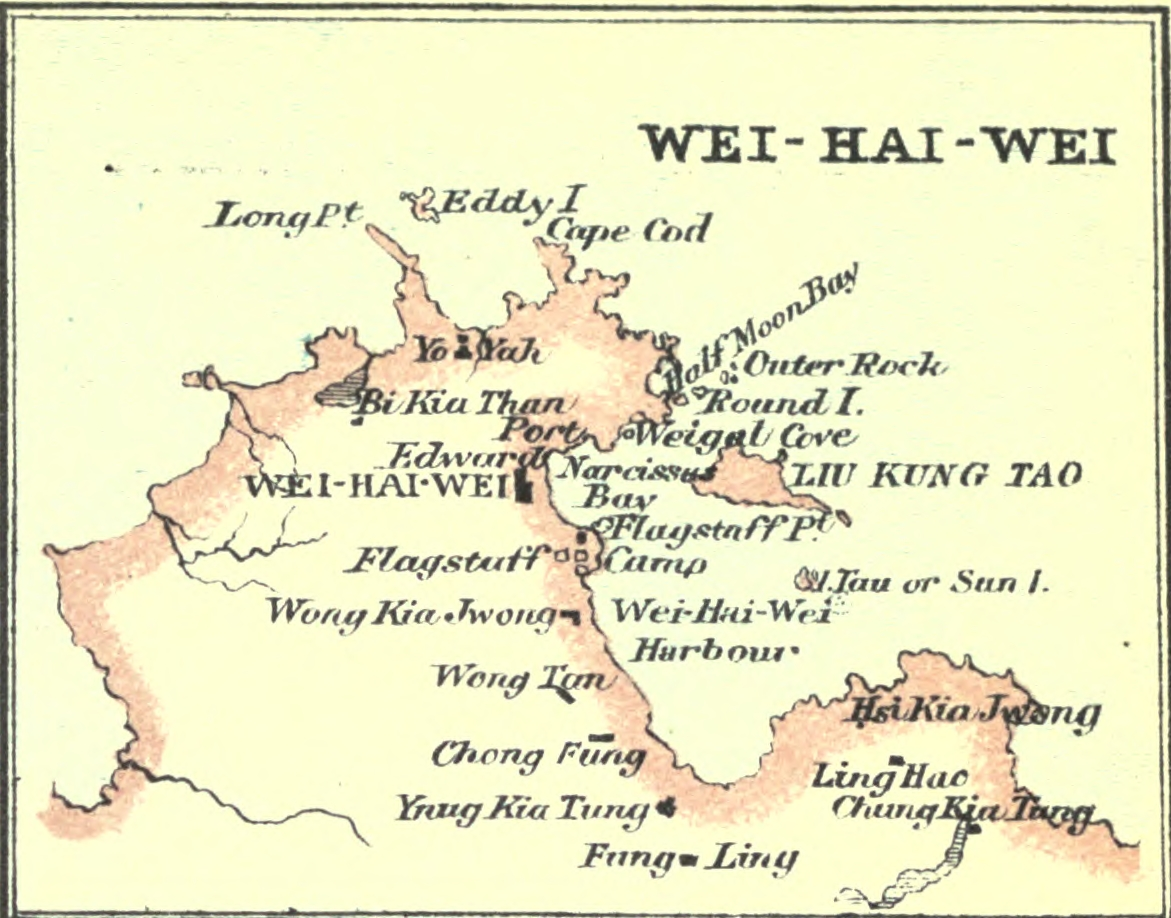
Map of Weihaiwei in 1906

Weihaiwei became an integral part of China after it was returned to the Republic of China on 1 October 1930, but Liugong Island and its facilities were leased back to the U.K. until 1940.

Weihaiwei was occupied by the Japanese from 1938 to 1945. Most British forces and supplies were withdrawn from Liugong Island, following a Japanese military landing and occupation of the island in 1940.

=== Modern era ===
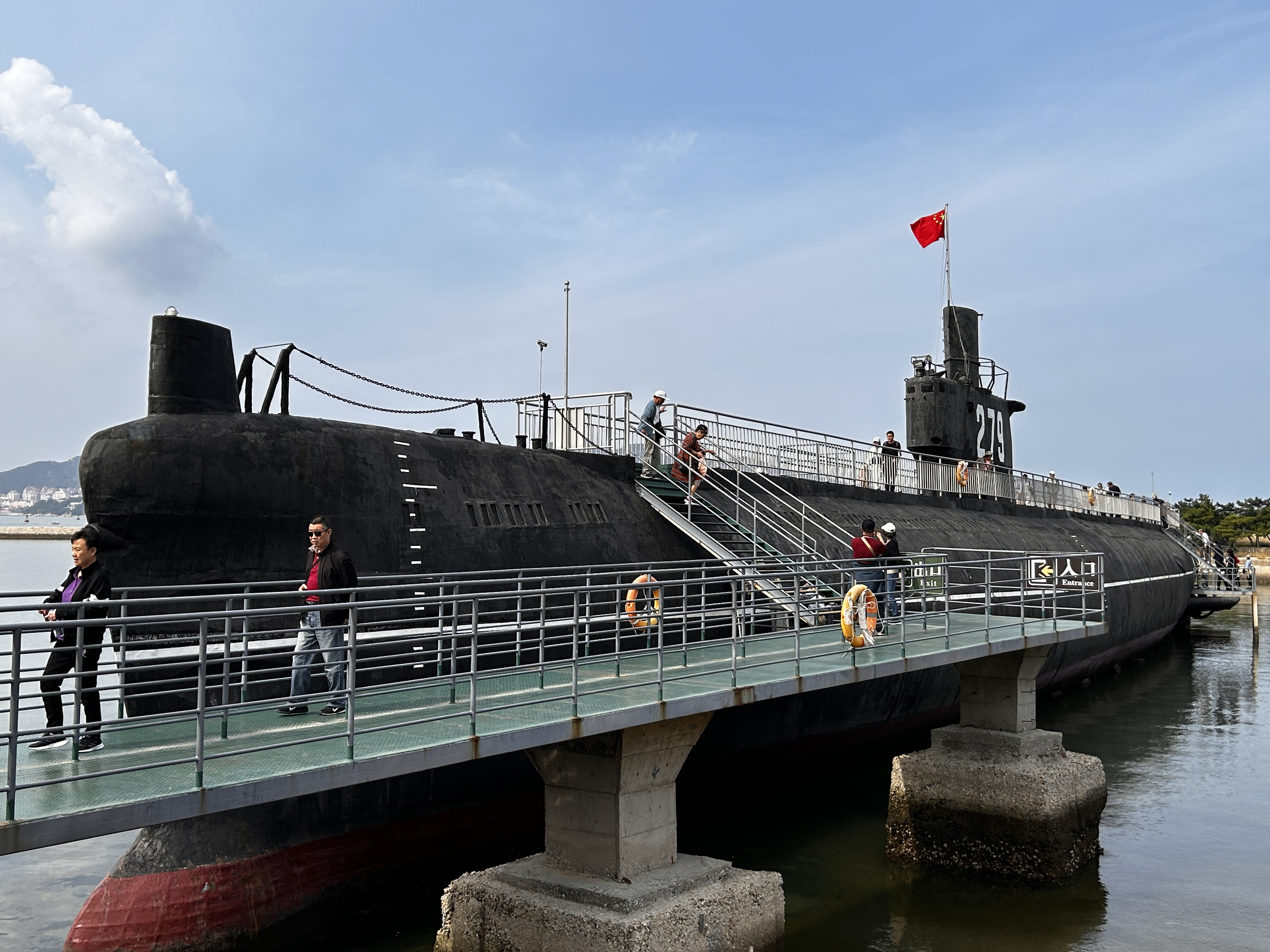
A PLAN submarine displayed in Weihai

The region was formally incorporated into Shandong province on 10 May 1945. In 1949, Weihaiwei City was established, and its name was shortened to Weihai after the Communist revolution.

In May 1950, the Wendeng Special District was established, administering eight counties: Weihai, Rongcheng, Wendeng, Kunyu, Rushan, Haiyang, Muping, and Fushan. In February 1956, the Wendeng District was abolished, and the present-day Weihai area was placed under the jurisdiction of the Laiyang District. In October 1958, the Laiyang District was reorganized as the Yantai District, which was renamed the Yantai Prefecture in February 1967, with the present-day Weihai area under its administration.

On June 15, 1987, separated from Yantai, Weihai was elevated to a prefecture-level city, with the former county-level Weihai City designated as Huancui District. The three counties of Rongcheng, Wendeng, and Rushan placed under the administration of Weihai City.

Since 2003, a replica of the Chinese battleship Dingyuan has been anchored here as a museum ship and memorial for Chinese veterans of the First Sino-Japanese War.

== Administrative divisions ==
The prefecture-level city of Weihai administers four county-level divisions, including two districts and two county-level cities. Weihai City has jurisdiction over two districts and two cities: Huancui District, Wendeng District, Rongcheng City, and Rushan City (Weihai Torch High tech Industrial Development Zone, Weihai Economic and Technological Development Zone, and Weihai Lingang Economic and Technological Development Zone are national level development zones, Weihai Nanhai Economic Development Zone is a provincial-level development zone, and the Development Zone Management Committee is a dispatched agency of the municipal government), with a total of 48 towns, 24 street offices, 2373 village committees, and 390 resident committees.

Map
Subdivision	Chinese	Pinyin
Huancui District	环翠区	Huáncuì Qū
Wendeng District	文登区	Wéndēng Qū
Rongcheng City	荣成市	Róngchéng Shì
Rushan City	乳山市	Rǔshān Shì

These are further divided into 66 township-level divisions, including 52 towns and 14 subdistricts.

== Geography ==
Weihai is located on the northeastern shore of Shandong; its administrative area includes Chengshantou (成山头), the easternmost tip of the Shandong Peninsula (Shantung Peninsula). The city is surrounded by sea on three sides; its port is protected by Liugong Island.

=== Climate ===
Weihai experiences a continental climate, and is climactically influenced by the surrounding Yellow Sea and the Siberian High. Weihai City is located in the mid latitudes and belongs to the northern temperate monsoon continental climate (Köppen Cwa/Dwa), with significant seasonal changes and monsoon advance and retreat. Compared with inland areas at the same latitude, it has more abundant rainfall and more moderate annual temperatures. Springtime warming and autumn cooling are delayed by one month, winds are generally high, and the average diurnal temperature variation throughout the year is small at only 6.5 °C (11.7 °F). Winters are cold and dry, but still warmer than inland regions at the same latitude; the average temperature in January is −0.5 °C (31.1 °F). Summers are hot and humid, but much cooler than inland regions at similar latitude like the North China Plain (by about 5–10 °C or 9–18 °F). August averages 25.3 °C (77.5 °F) and the annual mean is 13.1 °C (55.6 °F). More than two-thirds of the annual precipitation occurs from June to September, and there are nearly 2,508.5 hours of sunshine per year.

Climate data for Weihai, elevation 65 m (213 ft), (1991–2020 normals, extremes 1971–2000)
Month	Jan	Feb	Mar	Apr	May	Jun	Jul	Aug	Sep	Oct	Nov	Dec	Year
Record high °C (°F)	13.6 (56.5)	19.8 (67.6)	23.4 (74.1)	29.6 (85.3)	34.2 (93.6)	38.4 (101.1)	37.4 (99.3)	35.4 (95.7)	33.7 (92.7)	30.4 (86.7)	24.0 (75.2)	18.0 (64.4)	38.4 (101.1)
Mean daily maximum °C (°F)	2.3 (36.1)	4.5 (40.1)	9.8 (49.6)	16.7 (62.1)	22.6 (72.7)	26.1 (79.0)	28.4 (83.1)	28.4 (83.1)	25.0 (77.0)	19.3 (66.7)	12.2 (54.0)	5.2 (41.4)	16.7 (62.1)
Daily mean °C (°F)	−0.5 (31.1)	1.1 (34.0)	5.7 (42.3)	12.2 (54.0)	18.1 (64.6)	22.0 (71.6)	24.9 (76.8)	25.3 (77.5)	21.8 (71.2)	16.0 (60.8)	8.9 (48.0)	2.2 (36.0)	13.1 (55.7)
Mean daily minimum °C (°F)	−2.8 (27.0)	−1.6 (29.1)	2.5 (36.5)	8.4 (47.1)	14.2 (57.6)	18.7 (65.7)	22.2 (72.0)	22.8 (73.0)	19.2 (66.6)	13.1 (55.6)	6.1 (43.0)	−0.2 (31.6)	10.2 (50.4)
Record low °C (°F)	−12.3 (9.9)	−13.2 (8.2)	−8.6 (16.5)	−1.2 (29.8)	5.7 (42.3)	10.7 (51.3)	14.4 (57.9)	15.3 (59.5)	7.5 (45.5)	0.8 (33.4)	−7.4 (18.7)	−11.3 (11.7)	−13.2 (8.2)
Average precipitation mm (inches)	13.9 (0.55)	16.0 (0.63)	18.3 (0.72)	37.0 (1.46)	52.9 (2.08)	66.3 (2.61)	160.7 (6.33)	166.3 (6.55)	72.4 (2.85)	32.1 (1.26)	32.5 (1.28)	26.2 (1.03)	694.6 (27.35)
Average precipitation days (≥ 0.1 mm)	6.4	4.9	4.6	5.3	7.2	7.6	10.8	10.0	6.7	5.7	7.0	8.9	85.1
Average snowy days	11.0	6.5	2.3	0.1	0	0	0	0	0	0.2	3.3	10.8	34.2
Average relative humidity (%)	60	57	54	53	58	70	80	80	69	61	61	61	64
Mean monthly sunshine hours	159.1	179.6	233.2	245.7	273.5	245.8	205.2	220.7	225.4	215.6	164.2	140.5	2,508.5
Percentage possible sunshine	52	59	63	62	62	56	46	53	61	63	54	47	57
Source 1: China Meteorological Administration
Source 2: Weather China

Climate data for Chengshantou, Rongcheng, elevation 48 m (157 ft), (1991–2020 normals, extremes 1952–present)
Month	Jan	Feb	Mar	Apr	May	Jun	Jul	Aug	Sep	Oct	Nov	Dec	Year
Record high °C (°F)	11.8 (53.2)	16.2 (61.2)	25.2 (77.4)	24.3 (75.7)	29.2 (84.6)	31.4 (88.5)	32.0 (89.6)	33.5 (92.3)	31.7 (89.1)	27.6 (81.7)	22.2 (72.0)	16.7 (62.1)	33.5 (92.3)
Mean daily maximum °C (°F)	2.3 (36.1)	3.3 (37.9)	7.0 (44.6)	12.1 (53.8)	17.6 (63.7)	21.4 (70.5)	24.4 (75.9)	26.3 (79.3)	24.0 (75.2)	18.8 (65.8)	12.0 (53.6)	5.3 (41.5)	14.5 (58.2)
Daily mean °C (°F)	0.0 (32.0)	0.8 (33.4)	4.1 (39.4)	8.8 (47.8)	14.2 (57.6)	18.4 (65.1)	21.8 (71.2)	23.9 (75.0)	21.8 (71.2)	16.4 (61.5)	9.5 (49.1)	2.9 (37.2)	11.9 (53.4)
Mean daily minimum °C (°F)	−1.9 (28.6)	−1.2 (29.8)	1.9 (35.4)	6.5 (43.7)	11.4 (52.5)	15.9 (60.6)	19.6 (67.3)	21.9 (71.4)	19.8 (67.6)	14.4 (57.9)	7.3 (45.1)	0.8 (33.4)	9.7 (49.4)
Record low °C (°F)	−13.2 (8.2)	−15.7 (3.7)	−9.6 (14.7)	−2.6 (27.3)	2.4 (36.3)	8.7 (47.7)	13.8 (56.8)	16.0 (60.8)	10.4 (50.7)	−0.5 (31.1)	−7.3 (18.9)	−10.9 (12.4)	−15.7 (3.7)
Average precipitation mm (inches)	9.2 (0.36)	14.0 (0.55)	17.9 (0.70)	38.7 (1.52)	57.9 (2.28)	65.4 (2.57)	171.2 (6.74)	134.2 (5.28)	68.6 (2.70)	30.0 (1.18)	31.8 (1.25)	21.3 (0.84)	660.2 (25.97)
Average precipitation days (≥ 0.1 mm)	5.0	4.0	4.6	6.1	8.0	8.6	12.6	9.3	6.0	5.3	6.7	7.5	83.7
Average snowy days	8.9	4.9	1.7	0	0	0	0	0	0	0.1	2.6	8.7	26.9
Average relative humidity (%)	65	68	71	73	77	88	93	89	75	65	65	65	75
Mean monthly sunshine hours	172.2	185.5	230.9	231.5	245.2	203.3	162.0	216.3	230.6	219.8	166.8	146.9	2,411
Percentage possible sunshine	56	60	62	59	56	46	36	52	63	64	55	50	55
Source: China Meteorological Administration all-time extreme temperature

== Economy ==
Weihai is a commercial port and a major fishing center with some light industries. Due to its close proximity to South Korea, Weihai has a large Korean business community and receives many Korean tourists. In recent years, Weihai has vigorously implemented its urban internationalization strategy and deepened its opening-up and cooperation with South Korea in all aspects according to the concept of "three exchanges, four ports, and five connections", becoming a model for local exchanges and cooperation between China and South Korea. Weihai is also a key production area for peanuts and fruit. Weihai has a good industrial foundation. A complete production system has been basically formed, with mechanical, electronic, chemical, building materials, light industry, textile and other industries as the pillars, and plastic, silk, medicine, food, arts and crafts and other industries as the backbone.

=== Industrial Zone ===
Weihai Economic & Technological Development Zone is a state-level development zone approved by the State Council on 21 October 1992. The administrative area has an area of 194 km^{2} (75 sq mi), including the programmed area of 36 km^{2} (14 sq mi) and an initial area of 11.88 km^{2} (4.59 sq mi). The built-up area covers 42.3 square kilometers, governs 2 towns, 3 streets, 30 administrative villages and 50 communities, with a registered residence population of 175000 and a permanent population of 300000. Its nearest port is Weihai Port, and the airport closest to the zone is Dashuibo Airport.

Weihai Export Processing Zone (EPZ) was set up by the approval of the State Council on 27 April 2000. Weihai EPZ is located in Weihai Economic & Technological Development Zone with programmed area of 2.6 km^{2} (1.0 sq mi). Weihai EPZ belongs to comprehensive export & processing zone. The EPZ is located 30 km (19 mi) from Weihai Airport, 3 km (1.9 mi) to Weihai Railway Station and 4 km (2.5 mi) from Weihai Harbor. As a new frontier of opening up to the outside world, the processing zone has focused on developing five major industries: electronic information industry, precision machinery manufacturing, biotechnology and pharmaceutical industry, new materials, and food processing industry.

Weihai Torch Hi-Tech Science Park is a state-level development zone approved by the State Council in March 1991. Located in Weihai's northwest zone of culture, education and science, the Park has the total area of 111.9 km^{2} (43.2 sq mi), a coastline of 30.5 km (19.0 mi) and 150,000 residents. It is 3 km (1.9 mi) away from the city center, 4 km (2.5 mi) away from Weihai Port, 10 km (6.2 mi) away from Weihai Railway Station, 30 km (19 mi) away from Weihai Airport and 80 km (50 mi) away from Yantai Airport.

=== Transportation ===
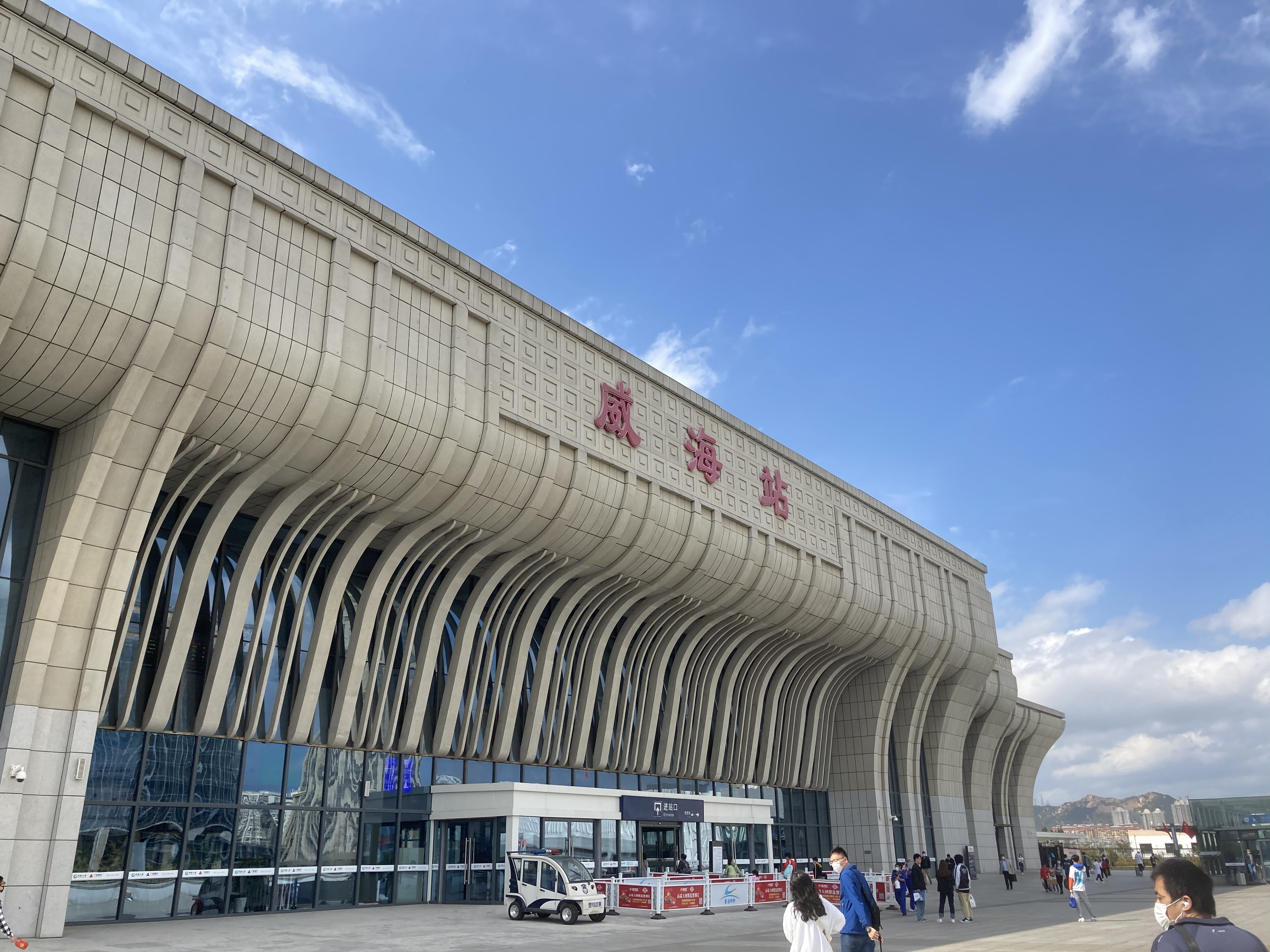
Weihai Railway Station, 2020

Weihai Dashuipo International Airport serves the city with regular service to Beijing, Shanghai, Guangzhou, Harbin domestically and the South Korean airport of Seoul–Incheon, as the fourth busiest airport in Shandong following Qingdao, Jinan and Yantai.

Qingdao–Rongcheng intercity railway offers the high-speed rail services directly to Shanghai Hongqiao, Beijing South, Jinan, Jimo North (Qingdao North soon) and Yantai, with five rail stations, Weihai, Weihai North, Wendeng, Wendeng East and Rongcheng.

Weihai Station is a first-class station in Weihai City, Shandong Province, and also the terminal station of Taowei Railway. It receives and sends more than 3000 passengers every day.

As for conventional rail services, the K8262 train departs every day at 10:18 PM for Jinan, the provincial capital, the K412 goes directly to Beijing at 8:54 PM, and the K1068 train leaves at 9:38 AM for Hankou, one of the three railway stations of Wuhan, Hubei. Internally, the city is served by more than 50 bus routes.

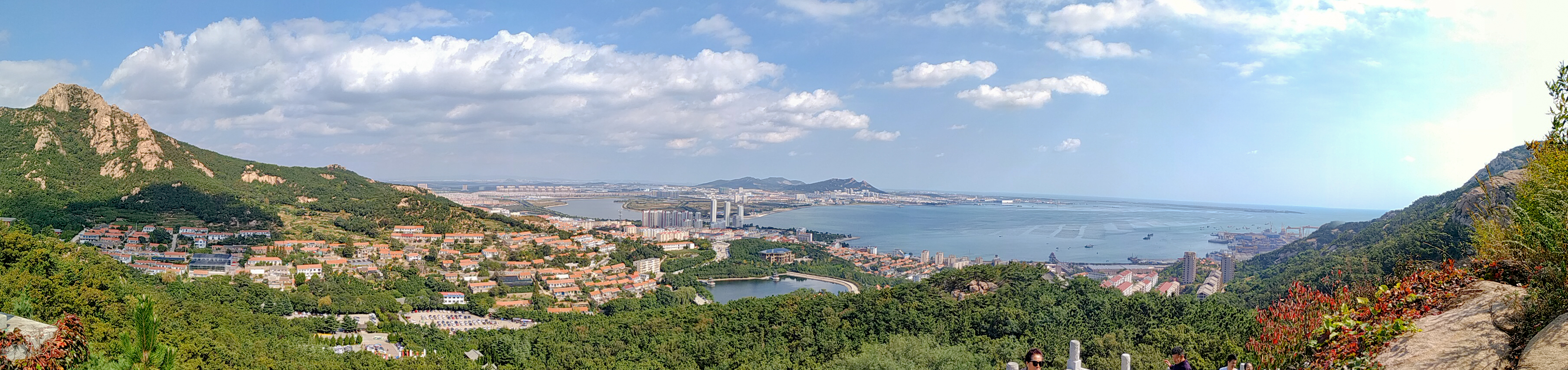
Panoramic view of Rongcheng

== Education ==
Campuses of Shandong University, Harbin Institute of Technology, Beijing Jiaotong University, Harbin University of Science and Technology, as well as Shandong Jiaotong University are located in Weihai.

== Notable persons ==
=== Miss World ===
Zhang Zilin, Miss World 2007.

Secondary schools

- Weihai No. 1 High School (威海市第一中学，威海一中)
- Weihai No. 2 High School (威海市第二中学，威海二中)
- Weihai No. 3 High School (威海市第三中学，威海三中)
- Weihai No. 4 High School (威海市第四中学，威海四中)

== Eponymy ==
- The minor planet 207931 Weihai is named after this city.

== See also ==
- Weihaiwei under British rule
- List of twin towns and sister cities in China
- Liugong Island
- Revenue stamps of Weihaiwei
