= Li Dongye =

Chinese general

- 李东野

Political Commissioner of National University of Defense Technology
- In office 10 February 1979 – 20 December 1983
- President: Zhang Yan
- Preceded by: Xie Youfa
- Succeeded by: Wang Hao

Personal details
- Born: 1916 Shenyang, Liaoning, Republic of China
- Died: 2011 (aged 94–95) Shanghai, People's Republic of China
- Party: Chinese Communist Party

Military service
- Allegiance: People's Republic of China
- Branch/service: People's Liberation Army Ground Force
- Years of service: 1937–1983
- Rank: Major general
- Battles/wars: Chinese Civil War
- Awards: Order of Independence and Freedom (2nd Class); Order of Liberation (China) (2nd Class); Order of Red Star (1st Class)

Chinese name
- Simplified Chinese: 李东野
- Traditional Chinese: 李東野
Transcriptions
Standard Mandarin
- Hanyu Pinyin: Lǐ Dōngyě

Li Dongye (Chinese: 李东野; 1916 – 2 January 2011) was a major general (shaojiang) of the People's Liberation Army (PLA) who served as political commissioner of National University of Defense Technology from 1979 to 1983.

== Biography ==
Li was born in Shenyang, Liaoning, in 1916. He joined the Chinese Communist Party (CCP) in 1937, and enlisted in the Eighth Route Army in the same year. During the Second Sino-Japanese War, he worked in the Central Party School of the Chinese Communist Party in Yan'an, Shaanxi. During the Chinese Civil War, he was deputy director of Political Department of the Liaoning Military District.

After the establishment of the Communist State in 1949, he became director of Political Department of Dalian Naval School. He was promoted to the rank of major general (shaojiang) in 1964. He was political commissioner of National University of Defense Technology in February 1979, and held that office until December 1983. On 2 January 2011, he died from an illness in Shanghai, aged 95.

Military offices
Preceded by Xie Youfa	Political Commissioner of National University of Defense Technology; 1979–1983	Succeeded by Wang Hao
