= Liu Zhongshan =

Chinese lieutenant general (1929–2021)

- 刘中山

Political Commissioner of National University of Defense Technology
- In office 30 June 1990 – February 1994
- President: Chen Qizhi
- Preceded by: Wang Hao
- Succeeded by: Zhao Jixiang

Personal details
- Born: 1929 Changtu County, Liaoning, Republic of China
- Died: 2021 (aged 91–92) Beijing, People's Republic of China
- Party: Chinese Communist Party

Military service
- Allegiance: People's Republic of China
- Branch/service: People's Liberation Army Ground Force
- Rank: Lieutenant general
- Battles/wars: Chinese Civil War

Chinese name
- Simplified Chinese: 刘中山
- Traditional Chinese: 劉中山
Transcriptions
Standard Mandarin
- Hanyu Pinyin: Liú Zhōngshān

Liu Zhongshan (Chinese: 刘中山; 1929 – 22 February 2021) was a lieutenant general of the People's Liberation Army (PLA) who served as political commissioner of National University of Defense Technology between 1990 and 1994. He was a member of the 8th and 9th National Committee of the Chinese People's Political Consultative Conference.

== Biography ==
Liu was born in Changtu County, Liaoning, 1929. He enlisted in the People's Liberation Army in September 1945, and joined the Chinese Communist Party (CCP) in March 1946. He was present at the Battle of Xiaoliangshan (小梁山战役) and Battle of Sanjiazi (三家子战役) during the Chinese Civil War.

He became political commissioner of National University of Defense Technology in June 1990, and served until February 1994. He was promoted to the rank of major general in September 1988 and lieutenant general in July 1993. On 22 February 2021, he died from an illness in Beijing, aged 92.

Military offices
Preceded by Wang Hao	Political Commissioner of National University of Defense Technology; 1990–1994	Succeeded by Zhao Jixiang
