= Wang Hao (born 1930) =

Chinese general (1930–2023)

- 汪浩

Political Commissioner of National University of Defense Technology
- In office 21 December 1983 – 30 June 1990
- President: Zhang Liangqi
- Preceded by: Li Dongye
- Succeeded by: Liu Zhongshan

Personal details
- Born: February 1930 Shanghai, China
- Died: 1 January 2023 (aged 92) Changsha, Hunan, China
- Party: Chinese Communist Party
- Education: Tsinghua University

Military service
- Allegiance: People's Republic of China
- Branch/service: People's Liberation Army Ground Force
- Rank: Major general

Wang Hao (Chinese: 汪浩; pinyin: Wāng Hào; February 1930 – 1 January 2023) was a Chinese major general (shaojiang) of the People's Liberation Army (PLA) who served as political commissioner of National University of Defense Technology between 1983 and 1990.

== Biography ==
Wang was born in Shanghai, in February 1930, while his ancestral home is in Changzhou, Jiangsu. In 1952, he graduated from Tsinghua University and taught at PLA Military Institute of Engineering. He joined the Chinese Communist Party (CCP) in that same year.

In 1979, he joined the faculty of National University of Defense Technology. He was named director of Department of Systems Engineering and Applied Mathematics in 1982. After this office was terminated in 1983, he became political commissioner of the university, serving until 1990.

Wang was promoted to the rank of major general (shaojiang) in 1988. He died in 2023.

Military offices
Preceded by Li Dongye	Political Commissioner of National University of Defense Technology; 1983–1990	Succeeded by Liu Zhongshan
