= Zhang Yan =

Zhang Yan may refer to:

- Zhang Yan (empress) (張嫣; died 163 BC), Western Han empress, wife and niece of Emperor Hui of Han
- Zhang Yan (Han dynasty) (張燕), late Eastern Han bandit chief
- Zhang Quanyi or Zhang Yan (張言; 852–926), Tang dynasty / Five Dynasties warlord
- Zhang Yan (Ming dynasty) (張彥), Ming dynasty painter
- Cheung Yin (張彥), pen name Xi Xi (西西; 1937–2022), Hong Kong writer
- Zhang Yan (oil painter) (张焰; born 1963), Chinese oil painter
- Zhang Yan (biathlete) (born 1992), Chinese biathlete
- Zhang Yan (figure skater) (born 1988), Chinese pair skater
- Zhang Yan (footballer, born 1972), Chinese football player
- Zhang Yan (table tennis) (born 1967), table tennis player
- Zhang Yan (footballer, born 1997), Chinese footballer
- Zhang Yan (major general), major general of the People's Liberation Army.
- Zhang Yan (politician, born 1969), Chinese politician, Member of the Standing Committee of the Fujian Provincial Committee of the Chinese Communist Party and Minister of Publicity.
