= Deng Xiaogang (scientist) =

Chinese scientist

- 邓小刚

President of National University of Defense Technology
- In office July 2017 – December 2019
- Preceded by: Yang Xuejun
- Succeeded by: Li Xiang

Personal details
- Born: September 1960 (age 66) Mianyang, Sichuan, China
- Party: Chinese Communist Party
- Education: Chengdu Aeronautic Polytechnic; Northwestern Polytechnical University; China Aerodynamics Research and Development Center

Military service
- Allegiance: People's Republic of China
- Branch/service: People's Liberation Army Ground Force
- Years of service: ?–president
- Rank: Major general
- Unit: PLA Academy of Military Science
- Scientific career
- Fields: Computational fluid dynamics
- Workplaces: PLA Academy of Military Science

Chinese name
- Simplified Chinese: 邓小刚
- Traditional Chinese: 鄧小剛
Transcriptions
Standard Mandarin
- Hanyu Pinyin: Dèng Xiǎogāng

Deng Xiaogang (born September 1960) is a Chinese scientist who is vice president of PLA Academy of Military Science, a former president of National University of Defense Technology, and an academician of the Chinese Academy of Sciences. He is an alternate of the 19th Central Committee of the Chinese Communist Party.

== Biography ==
Deng was born in Mianyang, Sichuan, in September 1960. He secondary studied at Nanshan High School. In 1981, he entered Chengdu Aeronautic Polytechnic, majoring in machining operation. In 1983, he was admitted to Northwestern Polytechnical University, graduating in 1989 with a bachelor's degree and his master's degree in aerodynamics. He went on to receive his doctor's degree in 1992 at China Aerodynamics Research and Development Center under the supervision of Zhang Hanxin. He was a postdoctoral fellow at Beihang University and then the University of Electro-Communications in Japan.

He was honored as a Distinguished Young Scholar by the National Science Fund for Distinguished Young Scholars in 2002. In July 2009, he became director of the newly founded State Key Laboratory of Aerodynamics. In July 2017, he was appointed president of National University of Defense Technology, succeeding Yang Xuejun.

== Honours and awards ==
- 7 December 2015 Member of the Chinese Academy of Sciences

Educational offices
Preceded by Yang Xuejun	President of National University of Defense Technology; 2017–2019	Succeeded by Li Xiang
