= Zhang Yulin =

- 张育林

President of National University of Defense Technology
- In office July 2008 – June 2011
- Preceded by: Wen Xisen
- Succeeded by: Yang Xuejun

Commander of the Jiuquan Satellite Launch Center
- In office 2004–2008
- Preceded by: Zhang Jianqi
- Succeeded by: Cui Jijun

President of Space Engineering University
- In office 2002–2003
- Preceded by: Chang Xianqi
- Succeeded by: Tu Hengzhang

Personal details
- Born: January 1958 (age 68) Qianyang County, Shaanxi, China
- Party: Chinese Communist Party
- Education: National University of Defense Technology; Zhejiang University; University of Waterloo

Military service
- Allegiance: People's Republic of China
- Branch/service: People's Liberation Army Ground Force
- Years of service: ?–present
- Rank: Lieutenant general

Chinese name
- Simplified Chinese: 张育林
- Traditional Chinese: 張育林
Transcriptions
Standard Mandarin
- Hanyu Pinyin: Zhāng Yùlín

Zhang Yulin (Chinese: 张育林; born January 1958) is an astronautic engineer and lieutenant general of the People's Liberation Army (PLA) of China. He has been Deputy Director of the PLA General Armaments Department since 2011, and previously served as the President of the National University of Defense Technology (NUDT), and Commander of the Jiuquan Satellite Launch Center.

== Biography ==
In 1958, Zhang was born in Qianyang County, Shaanxi Province. In 1978 Zhang entered NUDT, majoring in liquid rocket engine technology. Zhang graduated BE and ME from NUDT. From July 1984 Zhang was a lecturer and researcher at NUDT working on rocket engine dynamics and control. In 1988 Zhang graduated Doctor of Engineering from the Department of Industrial Automation of Zhejiang University.

Zhang did postdoc research at Canada's University of Waterloo. He was a professor and then promoted to the head of the Department of Astronautic Technology at NUDT. Zhang was the Director of Beijing Research Institute of NUDT. In 2004 Zhang was appointed as Commander of the Jiuquan Satellite Launch Center in Inner Mongolia, which is the largest spaceport of China. In July 2008 Zhang was pointed as President of the National University of Defense Technology of PLA. Zhang was also an adjunct professor of Tsinghua University.

On 29 December 2023, Zhang was removed from his position as a representative of the 14th National People's Congress.

Military offices
Preceded by Zhang Jianqi	Commander of the Jiuquan Satellite Launch Center; 2004–2008	Succeeded by Cui Jijun (崔吉俊)
Educational offices
Preceded by Chang Xianqi (常显奇)	President of Space Engineering University; 2002–2003	Succeeded by Tu Hengzhang (屠恒章)
Preceded by Wen Xisen	President of National University of Defense Technology; 2008–2011	Succeeded by Yang Xuejun
