= Yang Xuejun =

Chinese academic and educator

- 杨学军
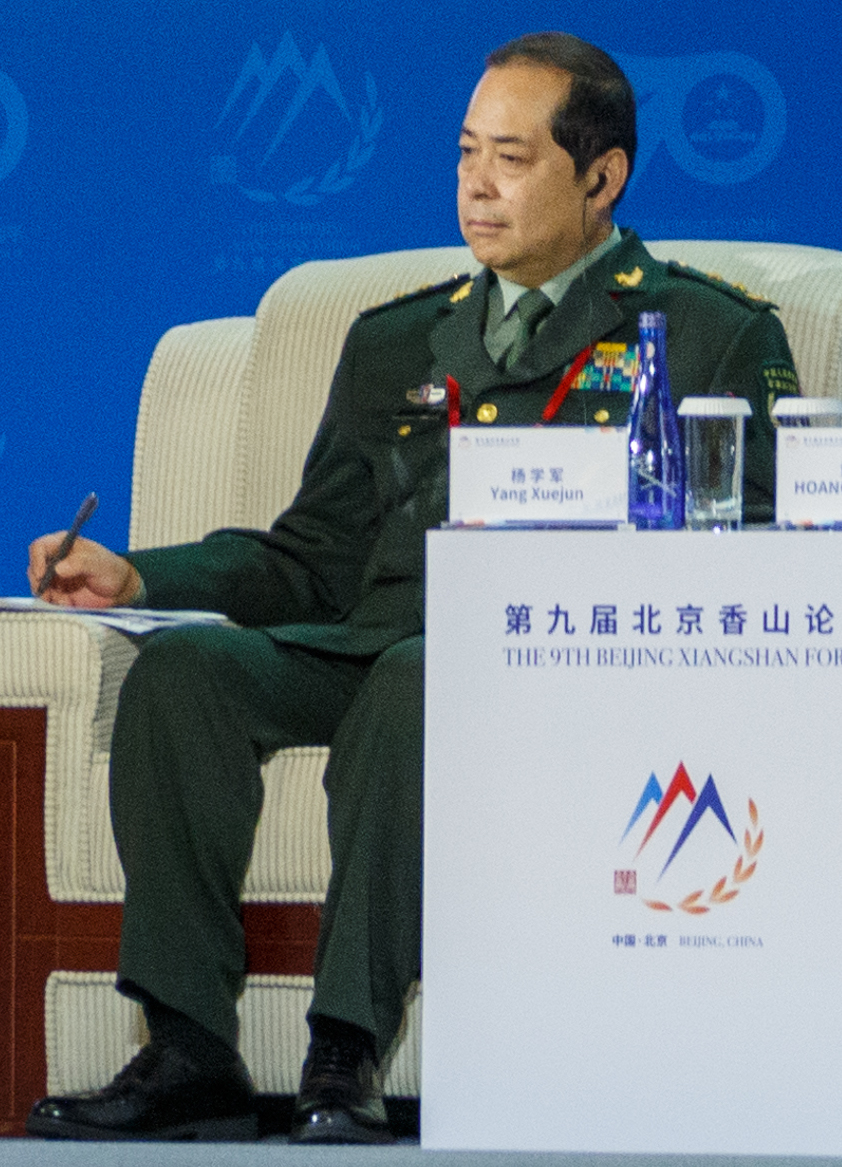
- Yang Xuejun in 2019

President of the PLA Academy of Military Science
- Incumbent
- Assumed office July 2017
- Preceded by: Zheng He

President of the National University of Defense Technology
- In office June 2011 – July 2017
- Preceded by: Zhang Yulin
- Succeeded by: Deng Xiaogang

Personal details
- Born: April 1963 (age 63) Wucheng County, Shandong, China
- Party: Chinese Communist Party
- Education: Nanjing Institute of Technology; National University of Defense Technology
- Profession: Computer science

Military service
- Allegiance: People's Republic of China
- Branch/service: People's Liberation Army Ground Force
- Years of service: 1979–present
- Rank: General

Chinese name
- Traditional Chinese: 楊學軍
- Simplified Chinese: 杨学军
Transcriptions
Standard Mandarin
- Hanyu Pinyin: Yáng Xuéjūn

Yang Xuejun (Chinese: 杨学军; born April 1963) is a Chinese educator and computer scientist currently serving as president of the PLA Academy of Military Science. Previously he served as president of the National University of Defense Technology. He was promoted to the rank of major general (shaojiang) in 2004, lieutenant general (zhongjiang) in August 2013 and general (shangjiang) in December 2019.

== Education ==
Yang was born in Wucheng County, Shandong in April 1963. He enlisted in the People's Liberation Army (PLA) in September 1979. In July 1983 he graduated from Nanjing Institute of Technology. In December 1984 he joined the Chinese Communist Party. He received his master's degree and doctor's degree in engineering from National University of Defense Technology in 1985 and 1991, respectively.

== Career ==
After graduation, he taught there, where he was vice-president in 2009 and president in July 2011. In 1994, at the age of 31, he became chief designer of supercomputer YH-3 and later became chief designer of Tianhe-1. He has been president of the PLA Academy of Military Science since July 2017.

He was a delegate to the 9th National People's Congress. He was a delegate to the 17th National Congress of the Chinese Communist Party. He was an alternate of the 18th CCP Central Committee. He is a member of the 19th CCP Central Committee.

== Honours and awards ==
- 1998 National Science Fund for Distinguished Young Scholars
- 2011 Science and Technology Award of the Ho Leung Ho Lee Foundation
- 2012 Chen Jiageng Science Award
- December 2011 Member of the Chinese Academy of Sciences (CAS)

Educational offices
Preceded by Zhang Yulin	President of the National University of Defense Technology; 2011–2017	Succeeded by Deng Xiaogang (scientist)
Preceded by Zheng He (born 1958)	President of the PLA Academy of Military Science; 2017	Incumbent
