= Dongyang, Liuyang =

Dongyang Town 洞阳镇
- Town
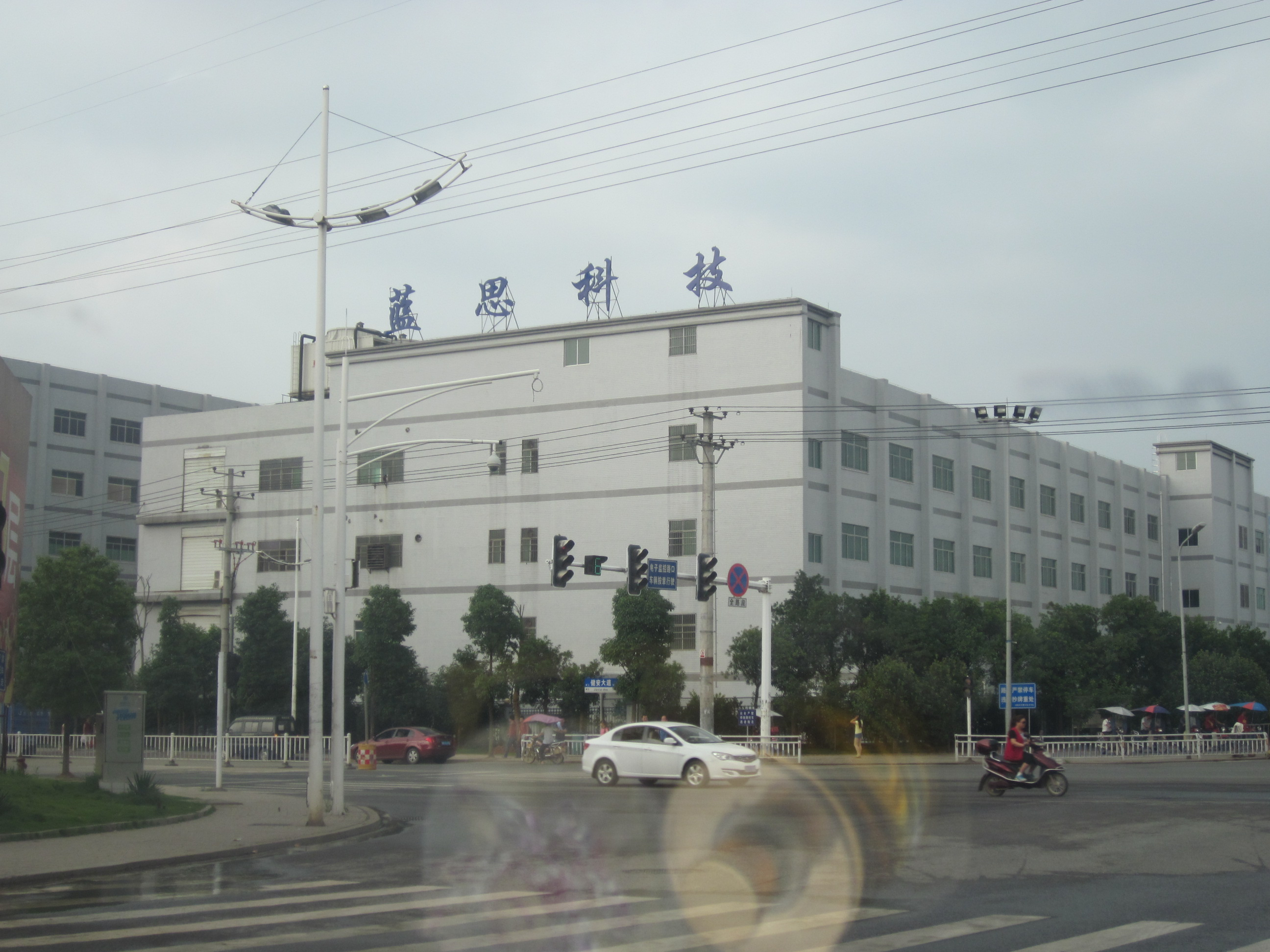
- The Lens Technology in the town.

- Location in Hunan
- Coordinates: 28°12′48″N 113°23′59″E
- Country: People's Republic of China
- Province: Hunan
- Prefecture-level city: Changsha
- County-level city: Liuyang

Area
  - Total: 106.9 km^{2} (41.3 sq mi)

Population (2016)
  - Total: 41,000
  - Density: 380/km^{2} (990/sq mi)
- Time zone: UTC+8 (China Standard)
- Postal code: 410329
- Area code: 0731

Dongyang Town (simplified Chinese: 洞阳镇; traditional Chinese: 洞陽鎮; pinyin: Dòngyáng Zhèn) is a town in Liuyang, Hunan, China. As of the 2016 census it had a population of 41,000 and an area of 106.9 square kilometres (41.3 sq mi). It borders Beisheng Town in the north, Jiaoxi Township in the east, Yong'an Town in the west, and Taipingqiao Town, Gejia Town and Changsha County in the south.

== Administrative divisions ==
The town is divided into six villages and five communities, which include the following areas: Dongyang Community, Dongyuan Community, Nanyuan Community, Beiyuan Community, Xingfuquan Community, Longdong Village, Jiuxi Village, Chengshan Village, Guanqian Village, Changdong Village, and Xiyuan Village (洞阳社区、东园社区、南园社区、北园社区和幸福泉社区,龙洞村、九溪村、砰山村、观前村、长东村和西园村).

== Geography ==
The Laodao River flows through the town.

Dongyang Reservoir (洞阳水库) is the second largest body of water in the town.

== Economy ==
The Liuyang Economic and Technological Development Zone and Liuyang Biomedical Park is located in the town.

== Education ==
Public junior high school in the town includes Dongyang Meddle School.

== Attractions ==
Lingsheng Temple is a Buddhist temple located in the town.

== Transportation ==
- National Highway: G319
- Expressway: Changsha-Liuyang Expressway, Liuyang-Liling Expressway, Daweishan-Liuyang Expressway
- County Road: Yongshe Xian, Liuhu Xian
