= Guo Guirong =

- 郭桂蓉

President of National University of Defense Technology
- In office February 1994 – July 1996
- Preceded by: Chen Qizhi
- Succeeded by: Wen Xisen

Personal details
- Born: 25 October 1937 (age 88) Chengdu, Sichuan, Republic of China
- Party: Chinese Communist Party
- Education: Xidian University; Zhukovsky Air Force Engineering Academy

Military service
- Allegiance: People's Republic of China
- Branch/service: People's Liberation Army Ground Force
- Rank: Lieutenant general
- Scientific career
- Fields: Communication
- Workplaces: National University of Defense Technology

Guo Guirong (Chinese: 郭桂蓉; pinyin: Guō Guìróng; born 25 October 1937) is a lieutenant general (zhongjiang) of the People's Liberation Army (PLA) who served as president of National University of Defense Technology from 1994 to 1996. He is an academician of the Chinese Academy of Engineering. He was a delegate to the 8th and 10th National People's Congress. He was a representative of the 17th National Congress of the Chinese Communist Party.

== Biography ==
Guo was born in Chengdu, Sichuan, on 25 October 1937, while his ancestral home in Xuqing County, Shanxi. After graduating from PLA Communication Engineering College (now Xidian University) in 1959, he was accepted to Harbin Institute of Military Engineering. In 1960, he was sent to study at Zhukovsky Air Force Engineering Academy on the expense of the government, earning a vice-doctorate degree in 1965.

He returned to China in 1965 and that year became professor at Harbin Institute of Military Engineering. In February 1994, he was appointed president of National University of Defense Technology, a position he held until July 1996.

== Honours and awards ==
- 1993 State Science and Technology Progress Award (Second Class) for KD85-466 system
- 1995 Member of the Chinese Academy of Engineering (CAE)
- 1999 State Science and Technology Progress Award (Second Class)
- 2006 Science and Technology Progress Award of the Ho Leung Ho Lee Foundation
- 2007 State Science and Technology Progress Award (Second Class)
- 2008 State Science and Technology Progress Award (Second Class)

Educational offices
Preceded by Chen Qizhi	President of National University of Defense Technology; 1994–1996	Succeeded by Wen Xisen
