= National Laboratory for Computational Fluid Dynamics =

The National Laboratory for Computational Fluid Dynamics (Chinese: 国家计算流体力学实验室) is a "National Key Laboratory" at the Beijing University of Aeronautics and Astronautics, Beijing, China. It was co-constructed by the China General Armament Department, Beijing University of Aeronautics and Astronautics, and the China Aerodynamics Research and Development Center. The plan to form the National Computational Fluid Dynamics Laboratory was proposed by the first experts committee on the field of aerospace in the early 1990s, approved by the COSTIND in May 1994, completed and opened to the public in April 1998.

The laboratory's research interests include numerical analysis, fluid mechanics, aircraft aerodynamics and so on.

As of November 2012, the laboratory director is Chun-Hian Lee, an academic of the Chinese Academy of Engineering.
