= Wen Xisen =

Chinese soldier and university president

- 温熙森

President of National University of Defense Technology
- In office July 1996 – July 2008
- Preceded by: Guo Guirong
- Succeeded by: Zhang Yulin

Personal details
- Born: March 1945 (age 81) Changshu, Jiangsu, Republic of China
- Party: Chinese Communist Party
- Education: Xi'an Jiaotong University

Military service
- Allegiance: People's Republic of China
- Branch/service: People's Liberation Army Ground Force
- Years of service: 1981–2008
- Rank: Lieutenant general

Chinese name
- Simplified Chinese: 温熙森
- Traditional Chinese: 溫熙森
Transcriptions
Standard Mandarin
- Hanyu Pinyin: Wēn Xīsēn

Wen Xisen (Chinese: 温熙森; born March 1945) is a lieutenant general (zhongjiang) of the People's Liberation Army (PLA) who served as president of the National University of Defense Technology from 1996 to 2008. He was an alternate of the 16th Central Committee of the Chinese Communist Party. He was a member of the 11th National Committee of the Chinese People's Political Consultative Conference.

== Biography ==
Wen was born in Changshu, Jiangsu, in 1945, during the Republic of China. He joined the Chinese Communist Party (CCP) in February 1966, and entered the workforce in September 1968. During the Cultural Revolution, he was a technician at Lanzhou Bearing Factory between April 1970 and September 1978. After resuming the college entrance examination in 1978, he was admitted to Xi'an Jiaotong University, majoring in mechanical control. After graduation in 1981, he joined the faculty of National University of Defense Technology. He was promoted to associate professor in December 1986, becoming deputy dean of Graduate School in August 1991. After this office was terminated in July 1996, he became president of the university, serving until July 2008.

Educational offices
Preceded by Guo Guirong	President of National University of Defense Technology; 1996–2008	Succeeded by Zhang Yulin
