= Deng Xiaogang =

Deng Xiaogang, may refer to:

- Deng Xiaogang (scientist) (born 1960), Chinese scientist, member of the Chinese Academy of Sciences
- Deng Xiaogang (politician) (born 1967), Chinese politician
