= Li Xiang (general) =

Chinese general

- 黎湘

President of National University of Defense Technology
- Incumbent
- Assumed office December 2019
- Preceded by: Deng Xiaogang

Personal details
- Born: September 1967 (age 58–59) Liuyang County, Hunan, China
- Party: Chinese Communist Party

Military service
- Allegiance: People's Republic of China
- Branch/service: People's Liberation Army Ground Force
- Years of service: ?–present
- Rank: Major general
- Scientific career
- Fields: Electronic information
- Workplaces: National University of Defense Technology

Li Xiang (Chinese: 黎湘; pinyin: Lí Xiāng; born September 1967) is a Chinese electronic information expert, major general in the People's Liberation Army, and member of the Chinese Academy of Sciences. He is the current president of the National University of Defense Technology, in office since December 2019.

== Biography ==
Li was born in the town of Beisheng, Liuyang County, Hunan, in September 1967. In December 2019, he took office as president of National University of Defense Technology, succeeding Deng Xiaogang.

== Honors and awards ==
- 18 November 2021 Member of the Chinese Academy of Sciences (CAS)

Educational offices
Preceded by Deng Xiaogang	President of National University of Defense Technology; 2019–present	Incumbent
