= Lingsheng Temple =

Buddhist temple in Hunan, China

- 灵圣寺
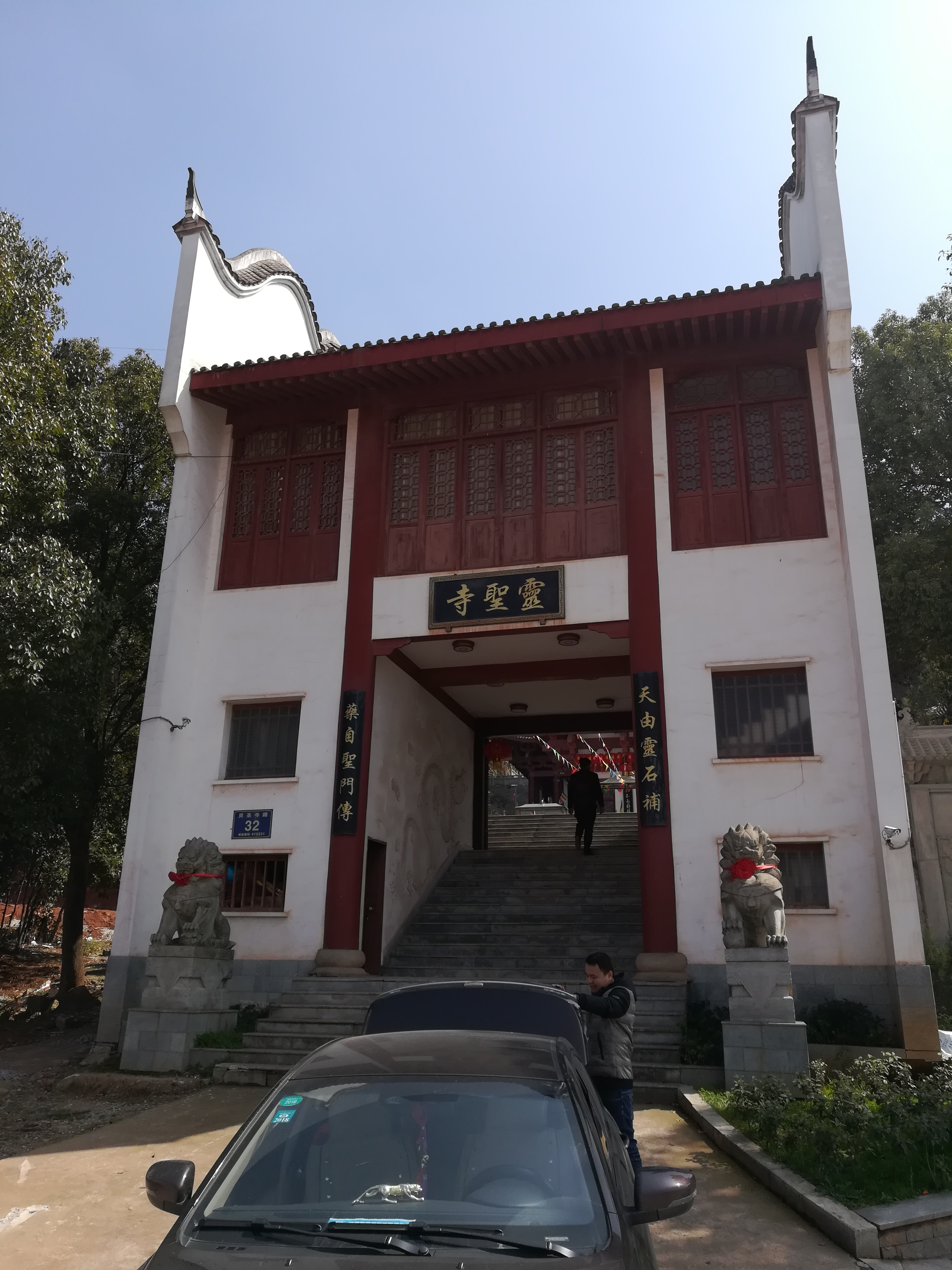
- The shanmen at Lingsheng Temple.

- Location within Hunan Location within China

Religion
- Affiliation: Buddhism
- Prefecture: Liuyang
- Province: Hunan
- Deity: Chan Buddhism

Location
- Country: China
- Interactive map of Lingsheng Temple
- Prefecture: Liuyang
- Coordinates: 28°13′42.54″N 113°24′29.53″E

Architecture
- Style: Chinese architecture
- Established: 693; 2008 (reconstruction)

Luohou Temple (simplified Chinese: 灵圣寺; traditional Chinese: 靈聖寺; pinyin: Língshèng Sì) is a Buddhist temple located in Dongyang Town of Liuyang, Hunan, China. It is adjacent to the Lens Technology.

== History ==
Lingsheng Temple was first established in 693, the 2nd year of Changshou period, at the dawn of Zhou dynasty (690–705), the modern temple was founded in 2008.

During the Cultural Revolution, the Red Guards had attacked the temple and it was completely destroyed.

In 1984, the local people reconstructed the temple on a small scale.

In early 2008, the temple started the reconstruction project. The construction began in August 2008 and the temple was completed in 2013.

== Architecture ==
Lingsheng Temple consists of more than 10 buildings.

=== Hall of Four Heavenly Kings ===
Maitreya is enshrined in the Hall of Four Heavenly Kings and at the back of his statue is a statue of Skanda. Statues of Four Heavenly Kings stand on the left and right sides. They are the eastern Dhṛtarāṣṭra, the southern Virūḍhaka, the western Virūpākṣa, and the northern Vaiśravaṇa.

=== Mahavira Hall ===
The Mahavira Hall is the second hall and main hall in the temple. In the middle is Sakyamuni, statues of Bhaisajyaguru and Amitābha stand on the left and right sides of Sakyamuni's statue. The statues of Eighteen Arhats stand on both sides of the hall. At the back, Statues of Longnü (left), Guanyin (middle) and Sudhana (right) are enshrined in the hall.

=== Hall of Medicine King ===
The Hall of Medicine King is the third hall of the temple for the worship of Hua Tuo, Sun Simiao, Zhang Zhongjing, Bian Que and Li Shizhen. The name of the Hall of Medicine King derives from Sun Simiao's honorific title "Medicine King" (药王).

== Gallery ==
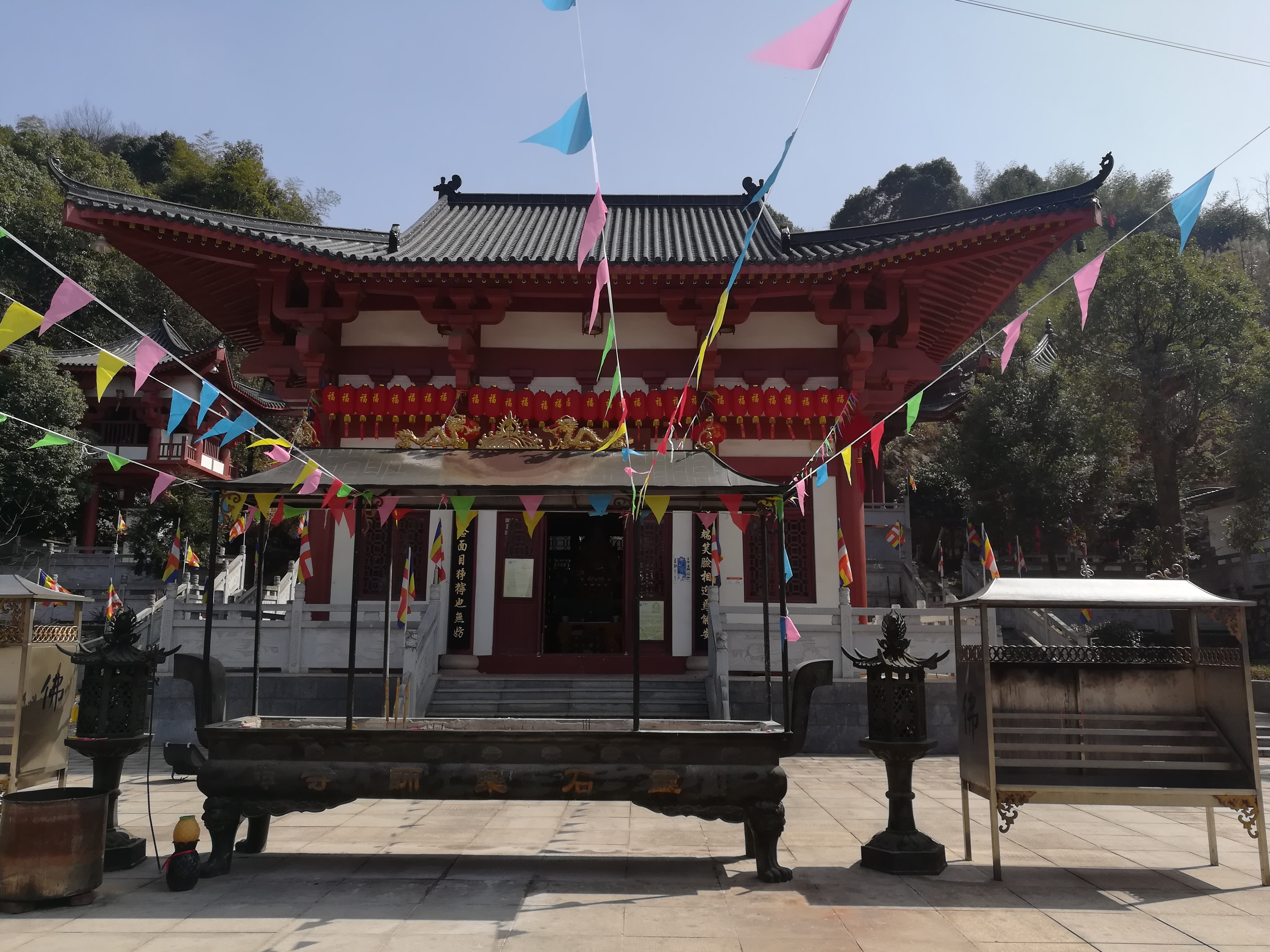
The Hall of Four Heavenly Kings.

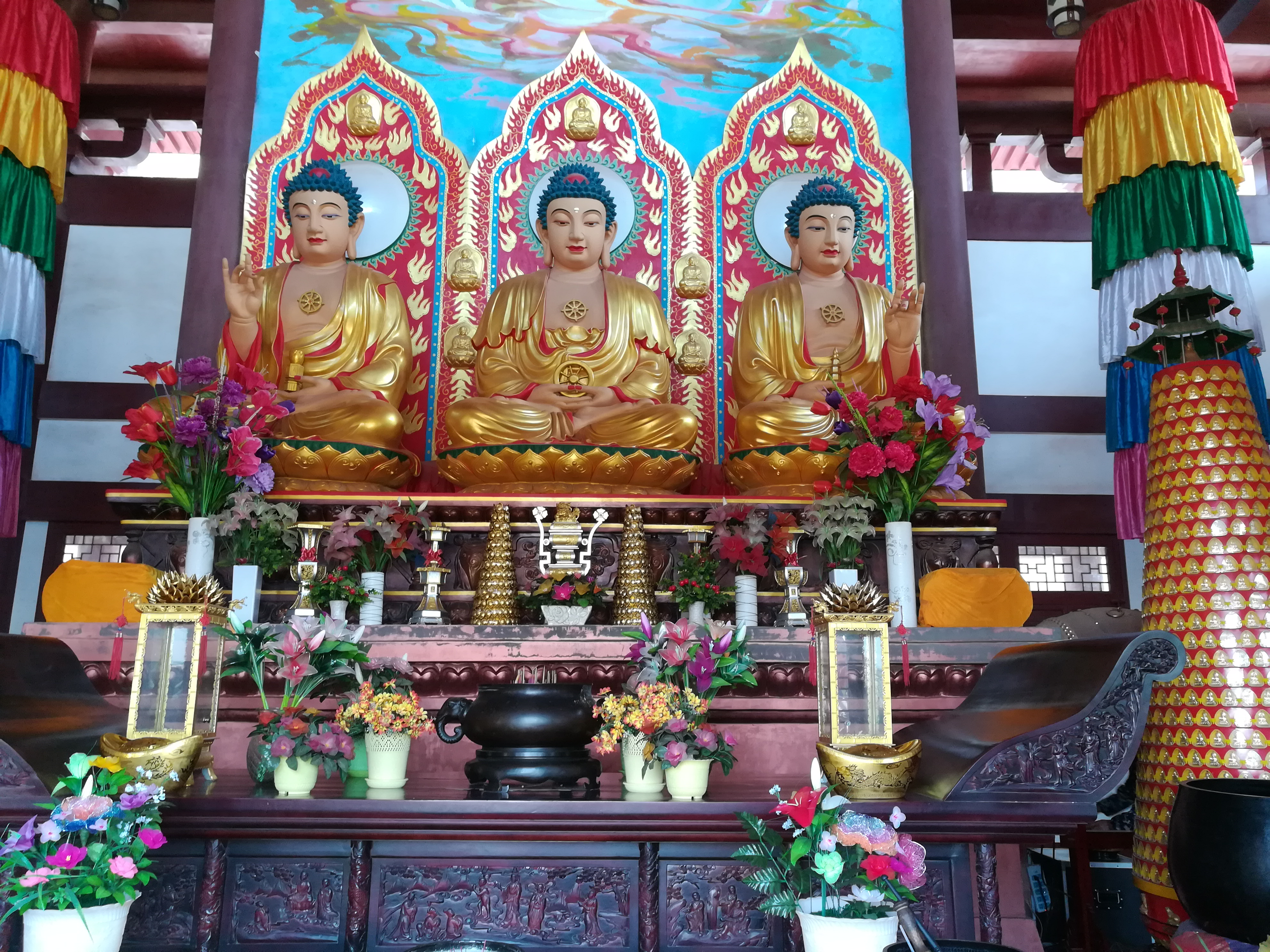
Statues of Bhaisajyaguru (left), Gautama Buddha (middle) and Amitābha (right) at the Mahavira Hall.

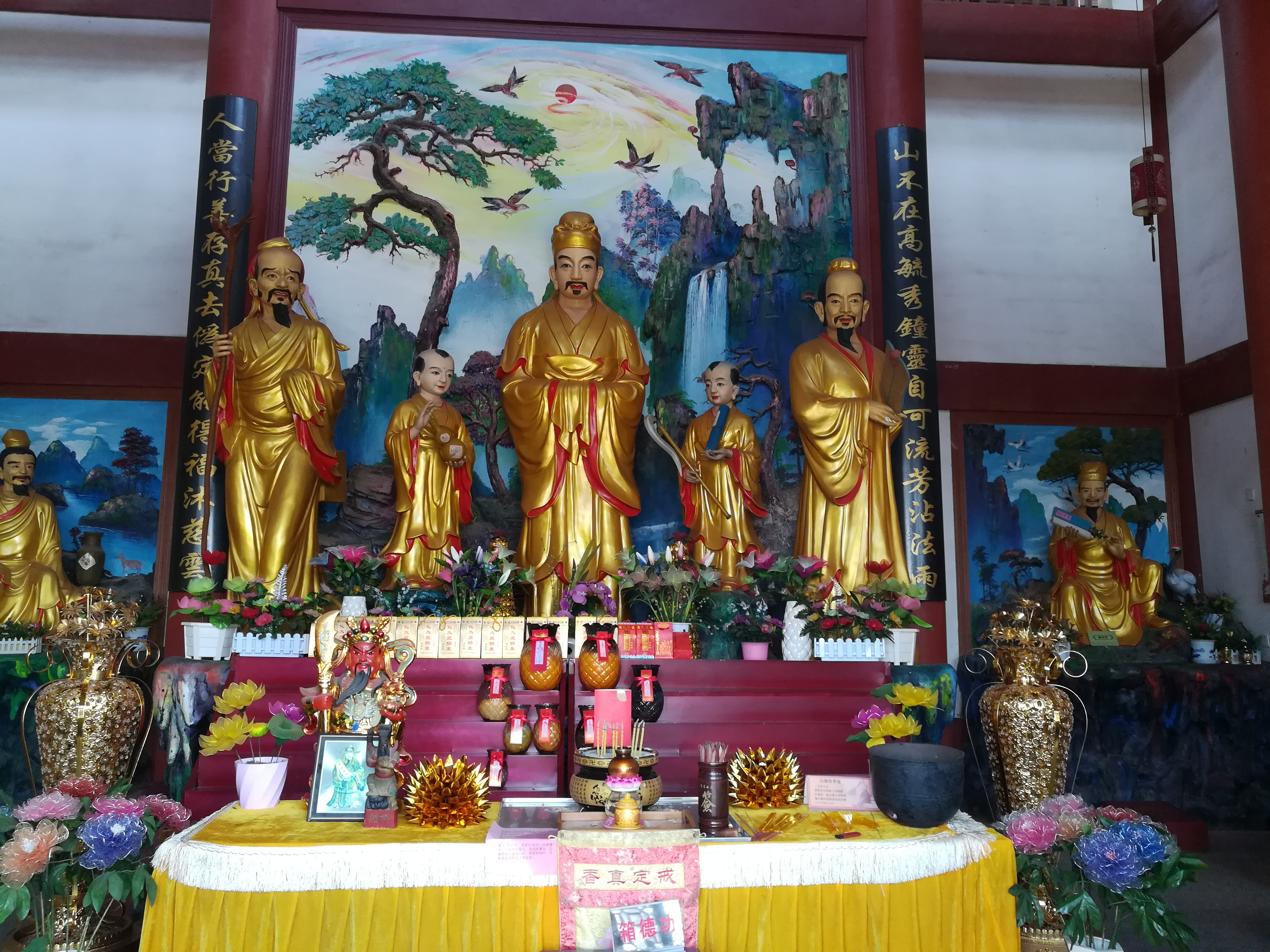
Statues of Hua Tuo (left), Sun Simiao (middle) and Zhang Zhongjing (right) at the Hall of Medicine King, in Lingsheng Temple.

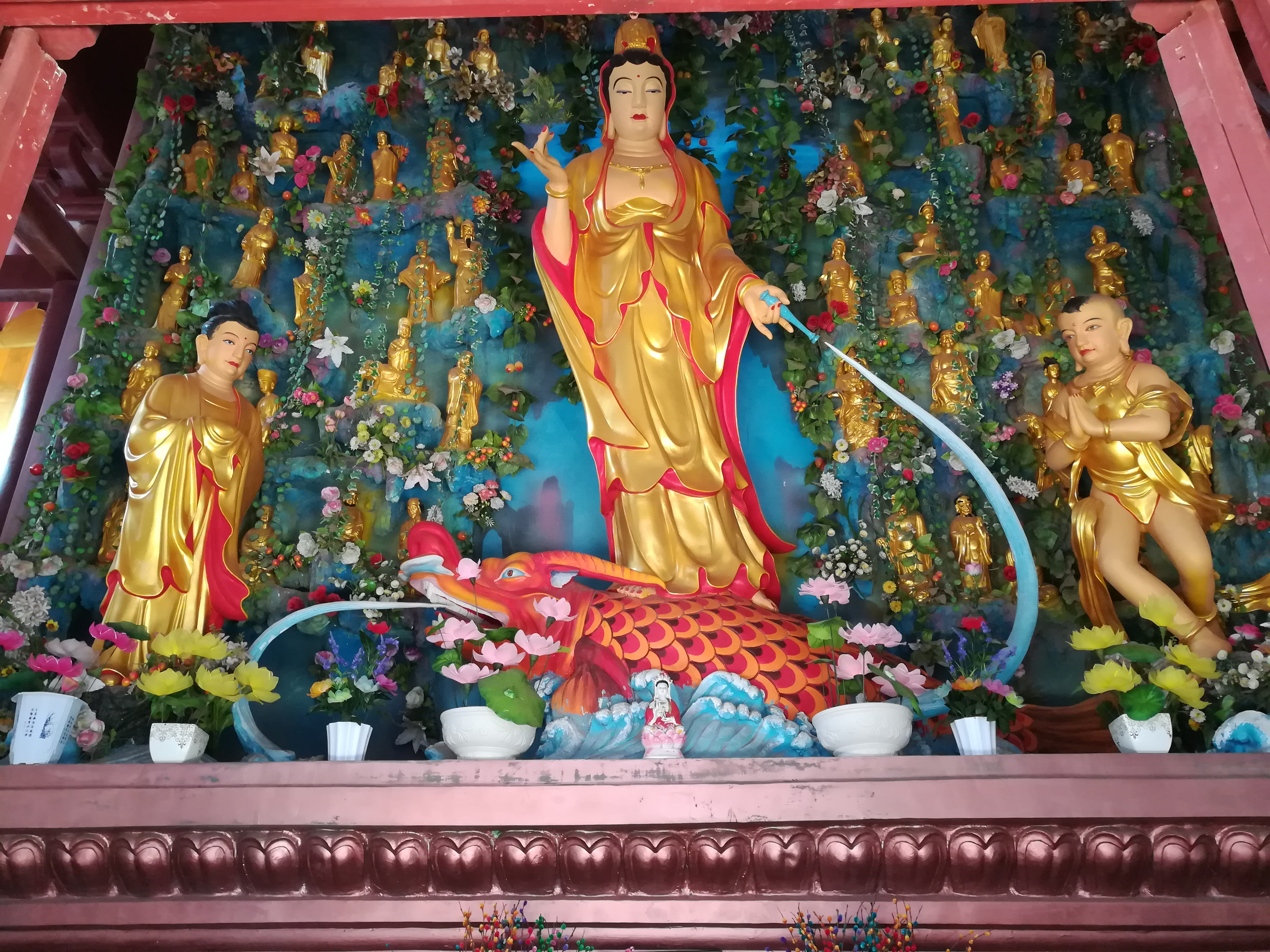
Statues of Longnü (left), Guanyin (middle) and Sudhana (right) at the Mahavira Hall.

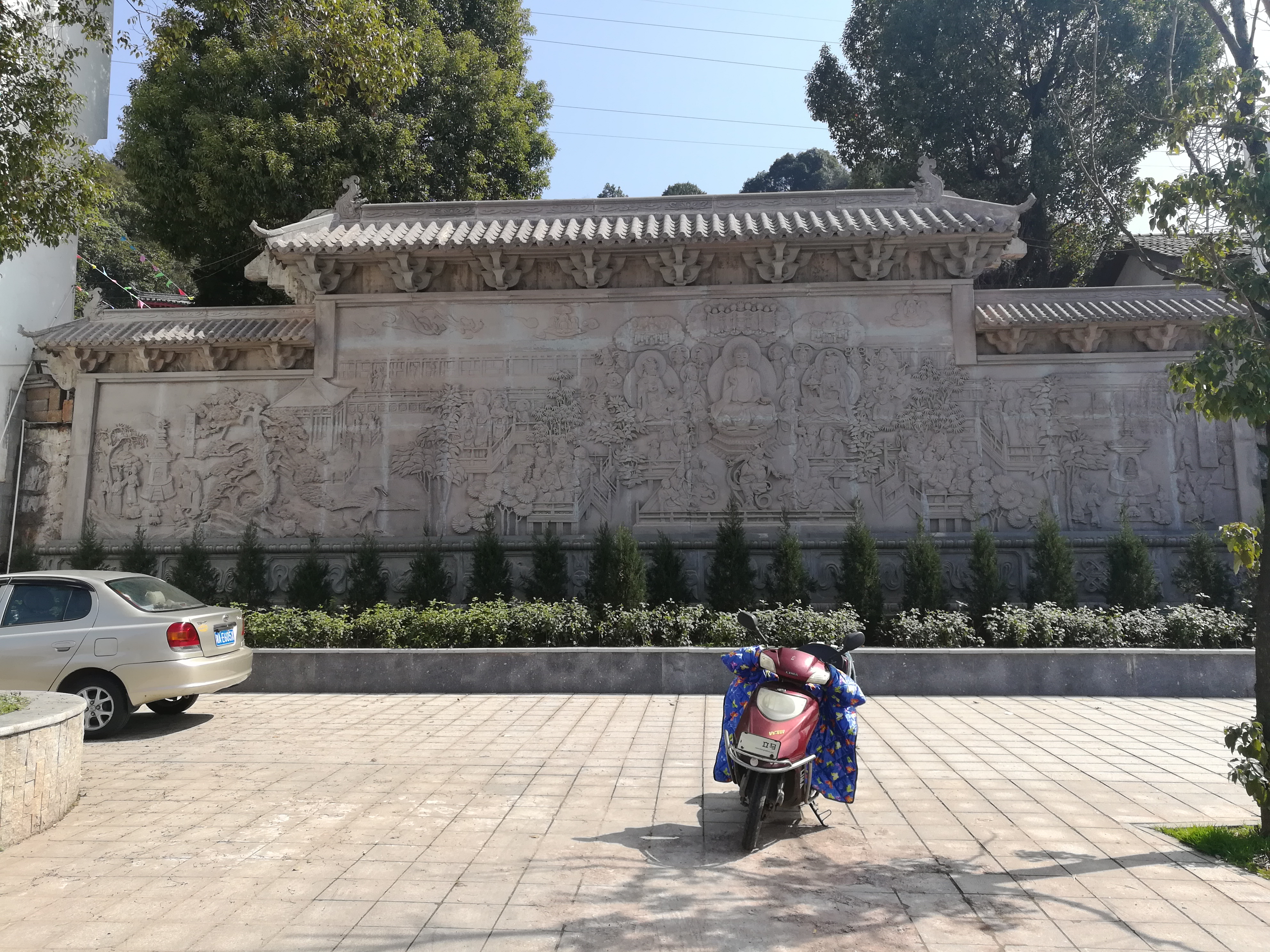
The Zhaobi (Wall) in Lingsheng Temple.
