= Iron Staff Lama =

1993 painting by Zhang Yan

- Artist: Zhang Yan
- Year: 1993
- Medium: Oil on canvas
- Dimensions: 102 cm × 120 cm (40 in × 47 in)
- Location: Vatican Museums; Vatican City

Iron Staff Lama is a 1993 oil painting created by Zhang Yan in Tibet, China. It depicts a lama carrying an iron staff with him while inspecting and disciplining monks. It has been owned by the Vatican Museums permanently in May 2017.

== Background ==
The lama with an iron staff, known as "dge-bskos" in Tibetan, are in charge of monitoring registers and disciplines at the monasteries of the Dratsang monks. They are officially referred to as the disciplinarian or the monastery monitor.

Historically, they often carried an iron staff with them when inspecting and disciplining the monks, which gained them the name of the “Iron Staff Lama”.

This is Zhang Yan's first oil painting. Because the cloth used in oil painting must be primed before drawing, and Tibet was lack of supplies at that time, the primer of this painting was specially formulated by him using local minerals at an altitude of 4000 meters in Tibet.

Iron Staff Lama is collected by the Vatican Museums permanently in May 2017, which is the first living artist's work permanently preserved by the Vatican Museum.
