= Beisheng, Liuyang =

Beisheng 北盛镇
- Town
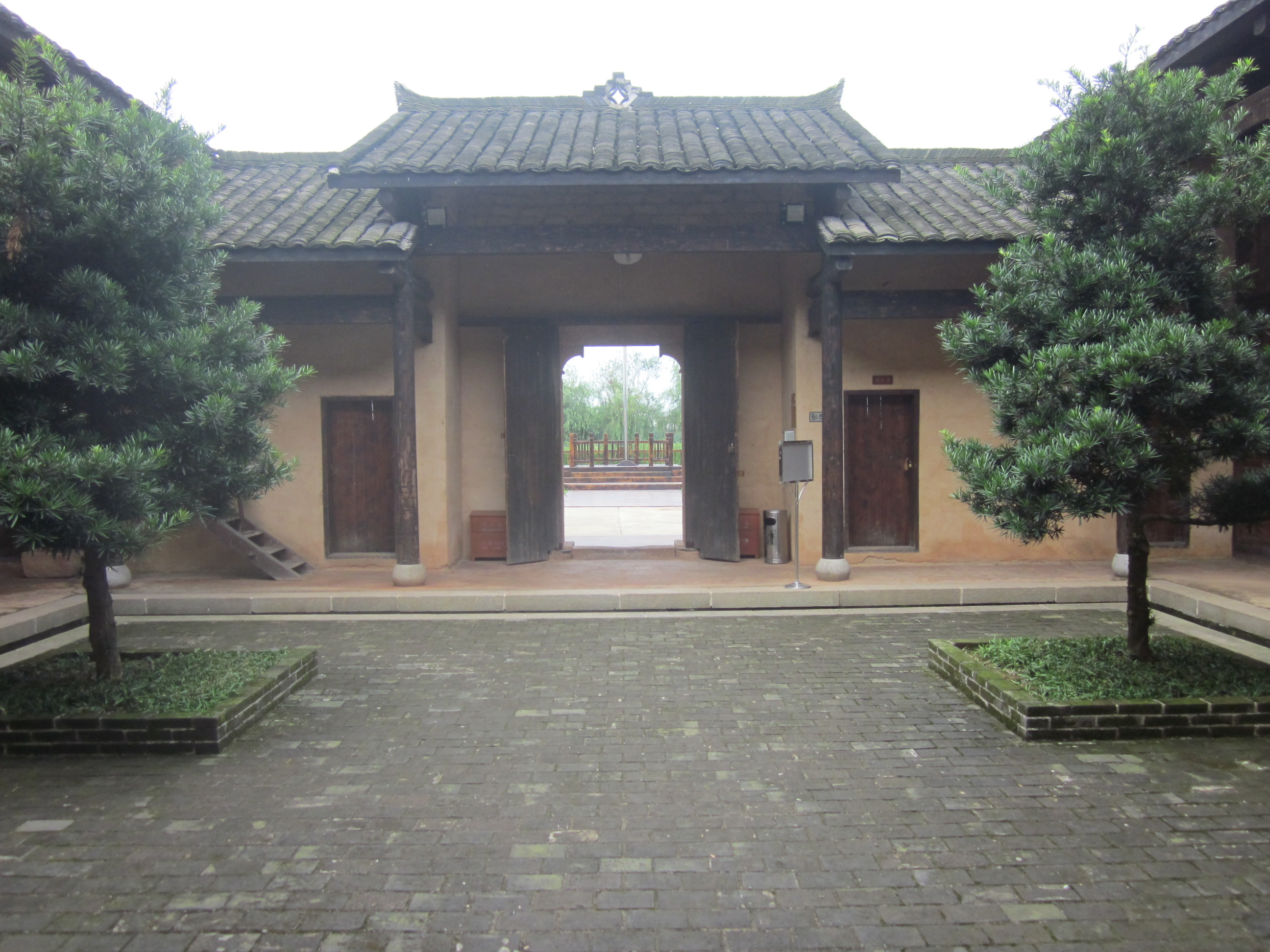
- Former Residence of Wang Zhen in the town.

- Location in Hunan
- Coordinates: 28°15′41″N 113°24′20″E
- Country: People's Republic of China
- Province: Hunan
- Prefecture-level city: Changsha
- County-level city: Liuyang

Area
  - Total: 78.4 km^{2} (30.3 sq mi)

Population (2016)
  - Total: 58,400
  - Density: 745/km^{2} (1,930/sq mi)
- Time zone: UTC+08:00 (China Standard)
- Postal code: 410324
- Area code: 0731

Beisheng Town (simplified Chinese: 北盛镇; traditional Chinese: 北盛鎮; pinyin: Běishèng Zhèn) is a town under the administration of Liuyang, Hunan, China. As of the 2016 census it had a population of 58,400 and an area of 78.4 square kilometres (30.3 sq mi). It borders Shashi Town in the north, Yong'an Town in the west, Jiaoxi Township and Chunkou Town in the east, and Dongyang Town in the south.

== Administrative divisions ==
The town is divided into 13 villages and two communities: Beishengcang Community, Wulong Community, Mazhan Village, Bajiao Village, Bianzhou Village, Boyang Village, Zhakou Village, Yanwuzhou Village, Lianfang Village, Yaojin Village, Huanyuan Village, Baitang Village, Yazhouhu Village, Bamao Village, and Zhuoran Village.

== Education ==
Public junior high school in the town includes Beisheng Meddle School. There is one senior high school located with the town limits: Liuyang No. 6 High School.

== Transportation ==
- Expressway: Liuyang-Liling Expressway

== Attractions ==
- The Former Residence of Wang Zhen is a scenic spot in the town.

== Notable persons ==
- Li Xiang (born 1967), an electronic information expert, major general, and member of the Chinese Academy of Sciences.
- Wang Zhen (general) (1908–1993), one of the Eight Elders of the Chinese Communist Party.
