= Bai Yilong =

Chinese mechanist (1940–2024)

- 白以龙
- Born: 20 December 1940; Xiangyun County, Yunnan, China
- Died: 9 May 2024 (aged 83); Beijing, China
- Education: University of Science and Technology of China
- Scientific career
- Fields: Mechanics
- Workplaces: Institute of Mechanics, Chinese Academy of Sciences

Chinese name
- Simplified Chinese: 白以龙
- Traditional Chinese: 白以龍
Transcriptions
Standard Mandarin
- Hanyu Pinyin: Bái Yǐlóng

Bai Yilong (Chinese: 白以龙; 22 December 1940 – 9 May 2024) was a Chinese mechanist and an academician of the Chinese Academy of Sciences. He was a member of the 10th and 11th National Committee of the Chinese People's Political Consultative Conference.

== Biography ==
Bai was born in Xiangyun County, Yunnan, on 22 December 1940, while his ancestral home is in Zhenhai County, Zhejiang. His father Bai Rubi (白汝壁) was a graduate of the Department of Civil Engineering, Beiyang University and once worked on the construction of the Yunnan–Burma railway in Yunnan. His mother Cang Chuanxian (仓传宪) graduated from Zhili Women's First Normal School. He had three older sisters. In 1958, he enrolled at the University of Science and Technology of China, where he majored in the Department of Modern Mechanics. He went to receive his master's degree from the Institute of Mechanics, Chinese Academy of Sciences in 1966.

After graduation in 1966, Bai stayed at the Institute of Mechanics as an intern researcher. He moved up the ranks to become assistant researcher in 1979, associate researcher in 1982, and researcher in 1986. He was a visiting scholar at the Oxford University and Cambridge University from 1979 to 1981. In 1987, he was appointed deputy director of the Institute of Mechanics, and held that office until 1994. In 1998, he was proposed as president of the Chinese Society of Theoretical Applied Mechanics, a position he held until 2002.

On 9 May 2024, Bai died in Beijing, at the age of 83.

== Honours and awards ==
- 1991 Member of the Chinese Academy of Sciences (CAS)
- 1992 State Natural Science Award (First Class)
- 1993 State Natural Science Award (Second Class)
- 1999 Science and Technology Progress Award of the Ho Leung Ho Lee Foundation
- 1999 Zhou Peiyuan Mechanics Award
- 2002 Member of Academia Europaea
- 2007 John Rinehart Award
- 2010 Mathematical Science Award of the Chen Jiageng Science Award

Non-profit organization positions
Preceded by Zhuang Fenggan	President of the Chinese Society of Theoretical Applied Mechanics; 1998–2002	Succeeded by Cui Erjie
Awards
Preceded by Zhang Hanxin	Recipient of the Zhou Peiyuan Mechanics Award; 1999	Succeeded by Huang Yongnian
Preceded by Peng Shige	Recipient of the Mathematical Science Award of the Chen Jiageng Science Award; 2010	Succeeded by Xue Qikun/ Chen Xi/ Ma Xucun
