= Zhang Liangqi =

- 张良起

President of National University of Defense Technology
- In office December 1983 – June 1990
- Preceded by: Zhang Yan
- Succeeded by: Chen Qizhi

Personal details
- Born: 1923 Shanghai, Republic of China
- Died: 2009 (aged 85–86) Beijing, People's Republic of China
- Party: Chinese Communist Party
- Spouse: Liu Duzhen (m. 1956; died 2009)
- Education: Shanghai Jiao Tong University

Military service
- Allegiance: People's Republic of China
- Branch/service: People's Liberation Army Ground Force
- Years of service: 1960–2009
- Rank: Major general
- Scientific career
- Fields: Automatic control
- Workplaces: National University of Defense Technology

Chinese name
- Simplified Chinese: 张良起
- Traditional Chinese: 張良起
Transcriptions
Standard Mandarin
- Hanyu Pinyin: Zhāng Liángqǐ

Zhang Liangqi (Chinese: 张良起; 1923 – 9 July 2009) was a major general (shaojiang) of the People's Liberation Army (PLA) who served as president of the National University of Defense Technology from 1983 to 1990.

== Biography ==
Zhang was born in Shanghai, in 1923, while his ancestral home in Wuxing County (now Wuxing District of Huzhou), Zhejiang. His father was an English teacher in Nanyang Model High School. He secondary studied at Nanyang Model High School. After graduating from Shanghai Jiao Tong University in 1946, he joined the faculty of Nanjing Naval Joint College. In 1958, he was transferred to the newly founded Harbin Institute of Military Engineering. He enlisted in the People's Liberation Army in 1960, and joined the Chinese Communist Party (CCP) in 1961. He was president of National University of Defense Technology in December 1983, and held that office until June 1990. He was promoted to the rank of major general (shaojiang) in 1988. On 9 July 2009, he died of an illness in Beijing, aged 86.

== Personal life ==
Zhang married Liu Duzhen (刘杜珍) in 1956.

Educational offices
Preceded by Zhang Yan	President of National University of Defense Technology; 1983–1990	Succeeded by Chen Qizhi
