= Jili, Liuyang =

Jili Subdistrict 集里街道
- Subdistrict
- Location in Hunan
- Coordinates: 28°09′21″N 113°36′31″E
- Country: People's Republic of China
- Province: Hunan
- County-level city: Liuyang

Area
  - Total: 153.8 km^{2} (59.4 sq mi)

Population (2015)
  - Total: 58,370
  - Density: 379.5/km^{2} (982.9/sq mi)
- Time zone: UTC+8 (China Standard)
- Postal code: 410300
- Area code: 0731

Jili Subdistrict (Chinese: 集里街道; pinyin: Jílǐ Jiēdào) is an urban subdistrict in Liuyang City, Hunan Province, People's Republic of China. As of the 2015 census it had a population of 58,370 and an area of 153.8 square kilometres (59.4 sq mi). Taipingqiao Town merged to Jili Subdistrict on November 18, 2015. It borders Jiaoxi Township in the north, Guankou Subdistrict in the northeast, Huaichuan Subdistrict in the southeast, Gejia Township in the west, Dongyang Town in the northwest, and Hehua Subdistrict and Chengchong Town in the south.

== History ==
In 2015, Taipingqiao Town merged to Jili Subdistrict.

== Administrative divisions ==
The subdistrict is divided into seven villages and five communities, which include the following areas:

- Shenxian'ao Community (神仙坳社区)
- Jiliqiao Community (集里桥社区)
- Baiyi Community (百宜社区)
- Xihe Community (禧和社区)
- Gongjiaqiao Community (龚家桥社区)
- Taiping Community (太平社区)
- Jinmei Community (锦美社区)
- Xihu Village (西湖村)
- Beicheng Village (北城村)
- Daowu Village (道吾村)
- Hongyuan Village (宏源村)
- Tangjiayuan Village (唐家园村)
- Xingzhen Village (星镇村)
- Hesheng Village (合盛村)

== Geography ==
Mountains located adjacent to and visible from the townsite are: Mount Daowu (道吾山; 787 metres (2,582 ft)) and Mount Xianren (仙人岭; 331.7 metres (1,088 ft)).

Liuyang River, also known as the mother river, flows through the subdistrict.

Daowushan Reservoir (道吾山水库) is the largest reservoir and largest water body in the subdistrict.

== Economy ==
The economy is supported primarily by commerce and tourism.

== Education ==
- Jili Middle School

== Transportation ==
The West Bus station is situated at the subdistrict.

=== National Highway ===
The subdistrict is connected to two national highways: G106 and G319.

=== Provincial Highway ===
The Provincial Highway S103 runs southwest–northeast through the subdistrict.

=== Expressway ===
The Changsha–Liuyang Expressway, from Changsha, running northwest to southeast through the subdistrict to Jiangxi.

== Religion ==
Xinghua Chan Temple (兴华禅寺) is a Buddhist temple in the town.

== Attractions ==
Mount Daowu Scenic Spot is a tourist attraction in the town.

Xinwuling Park (新屋岭公园) is a public park in the subdistrict.
