= Former Residence of Wang Zhen =

- 王震故居
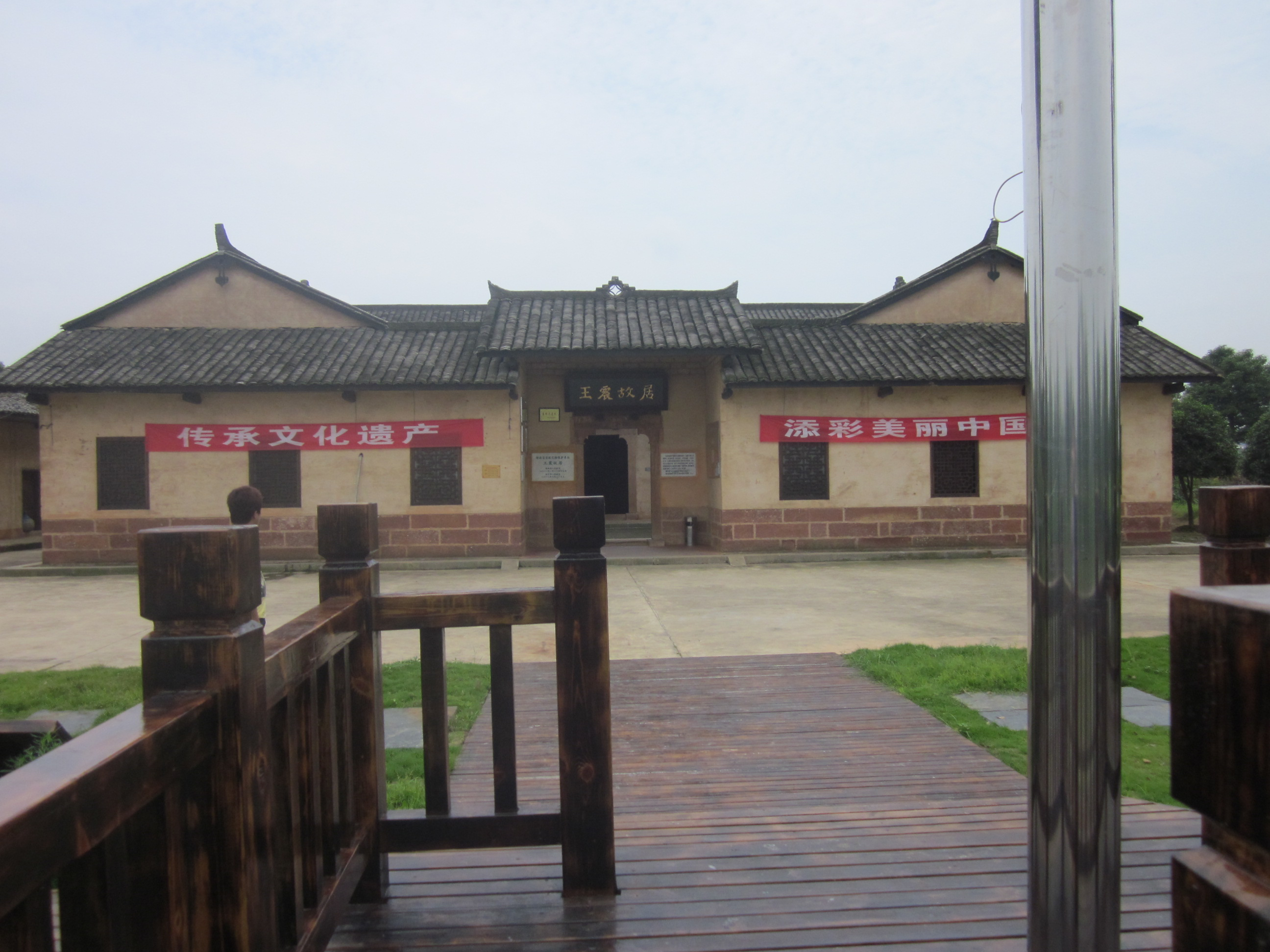
- Frontal view of the Former Residence of Wang Zhen.

- Location within Hunan Former Residence of Wang Zhen (China)

General information
- Type: Traditional folk houses
- Location: Beisheng, Liuyang, Hunan, China
- Coordinates: 28.248955°N 113.426024°E
- Opened: 2007
- Renovated: 2007
- Owner: Government of Liuyang

Technical details
- Floor area: 5,000 m^{2} (54,000 sq ft)

The Former Residence of Wang Zhen or Wang Zhen's Former Residence (Chinese: 王震故居; pinyin: Wāng Zhèn Gùjū) was built in the late Qing dynasty (1644–1911). It is located in Mazhan Village of Beisheng Town in Liuyang, Hunan, China. The building was the birthplace and childhood home of Wang Zhen, who was one of the Eight Elders of the Chinese Communist Party.

== History ==
In 1908, Wang Zhen was born here.

In 1940, the building was washed away by the flood.

In 2007, the local government rebuilt it.

In 2008, it was listed as a municipality protected historic site and patriotism education bases by the Changsha Municipal People's Government.

== Gallery ==
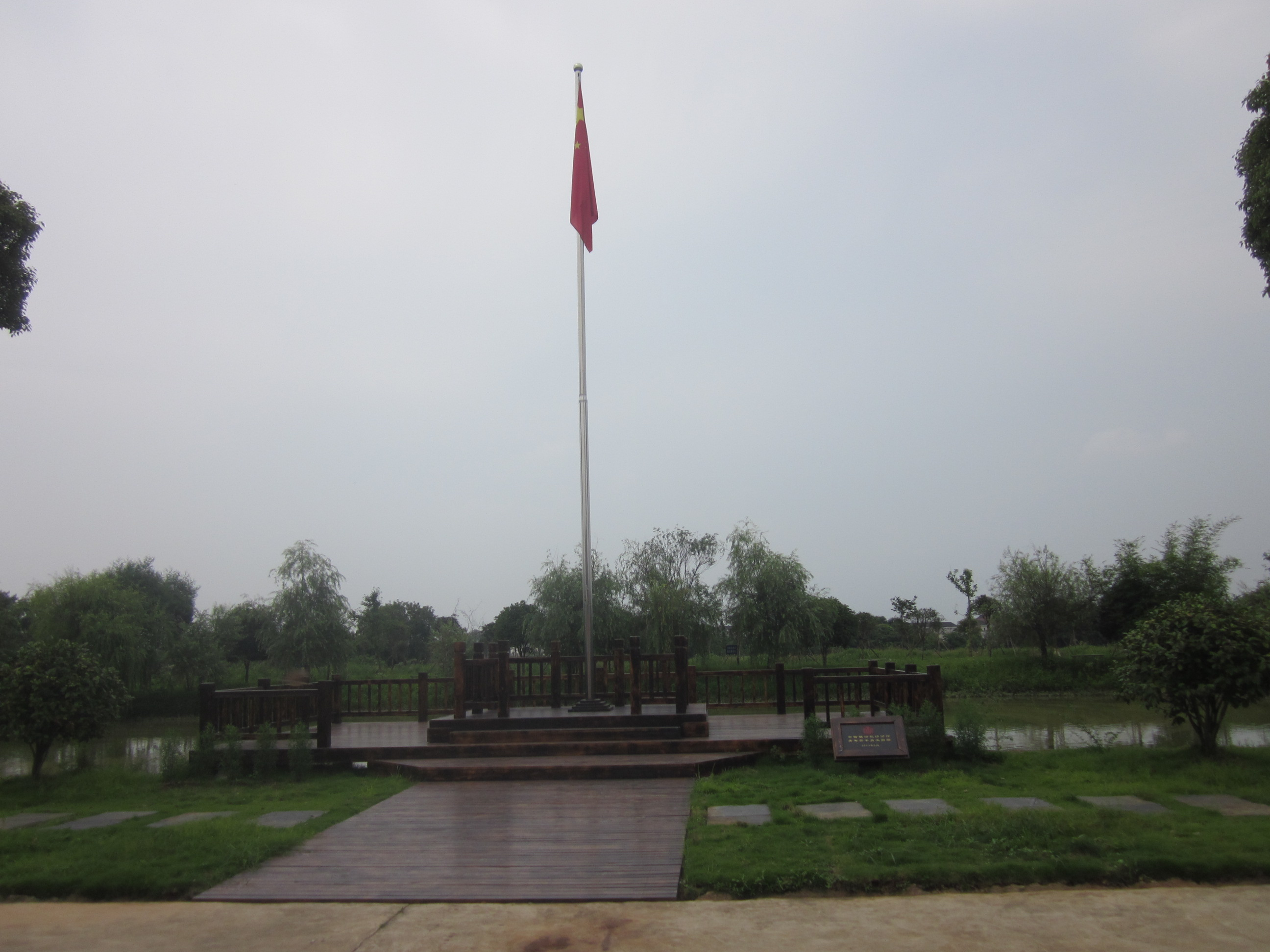
Wang Zhen's Former Residence

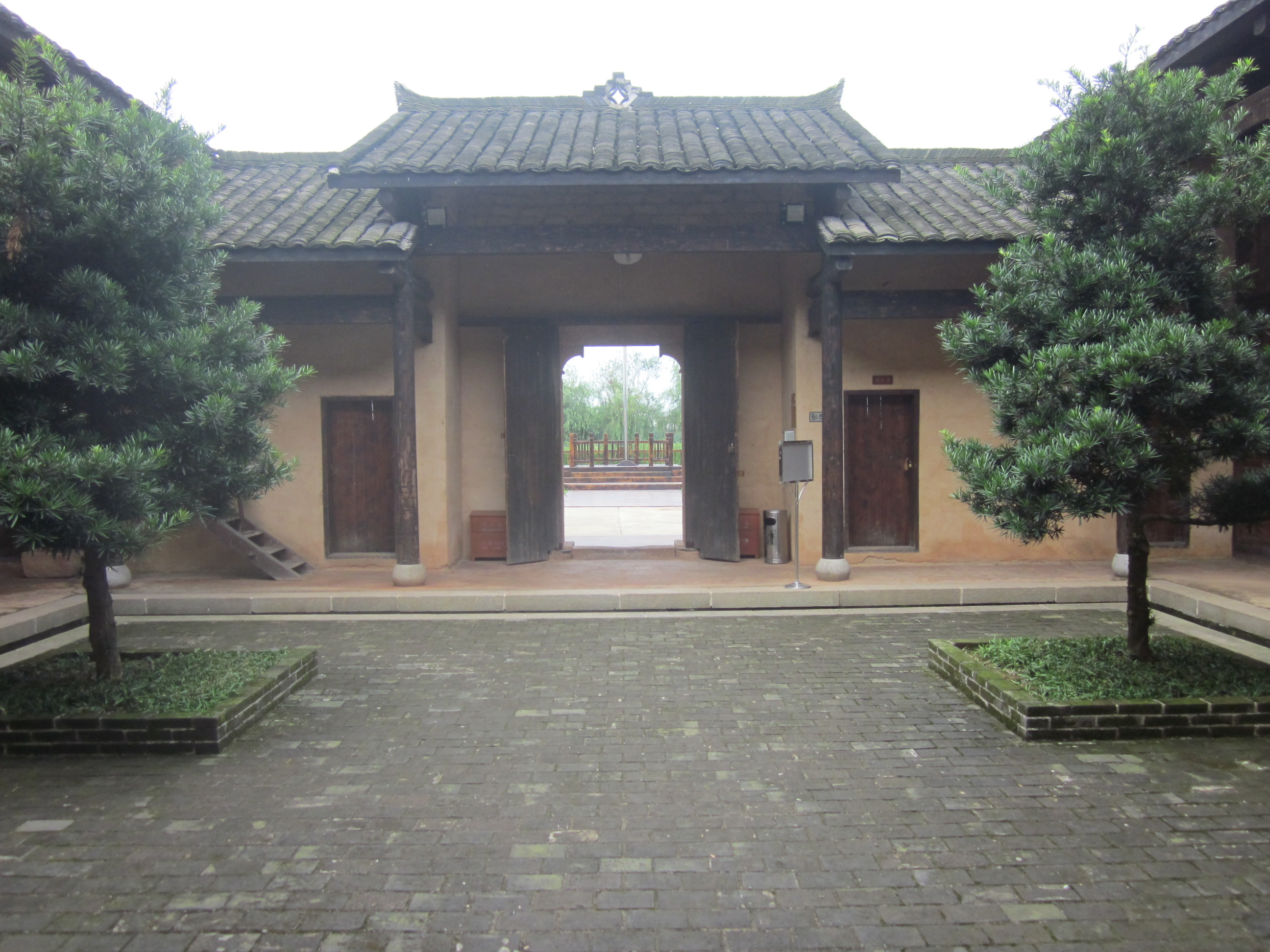
The gate.

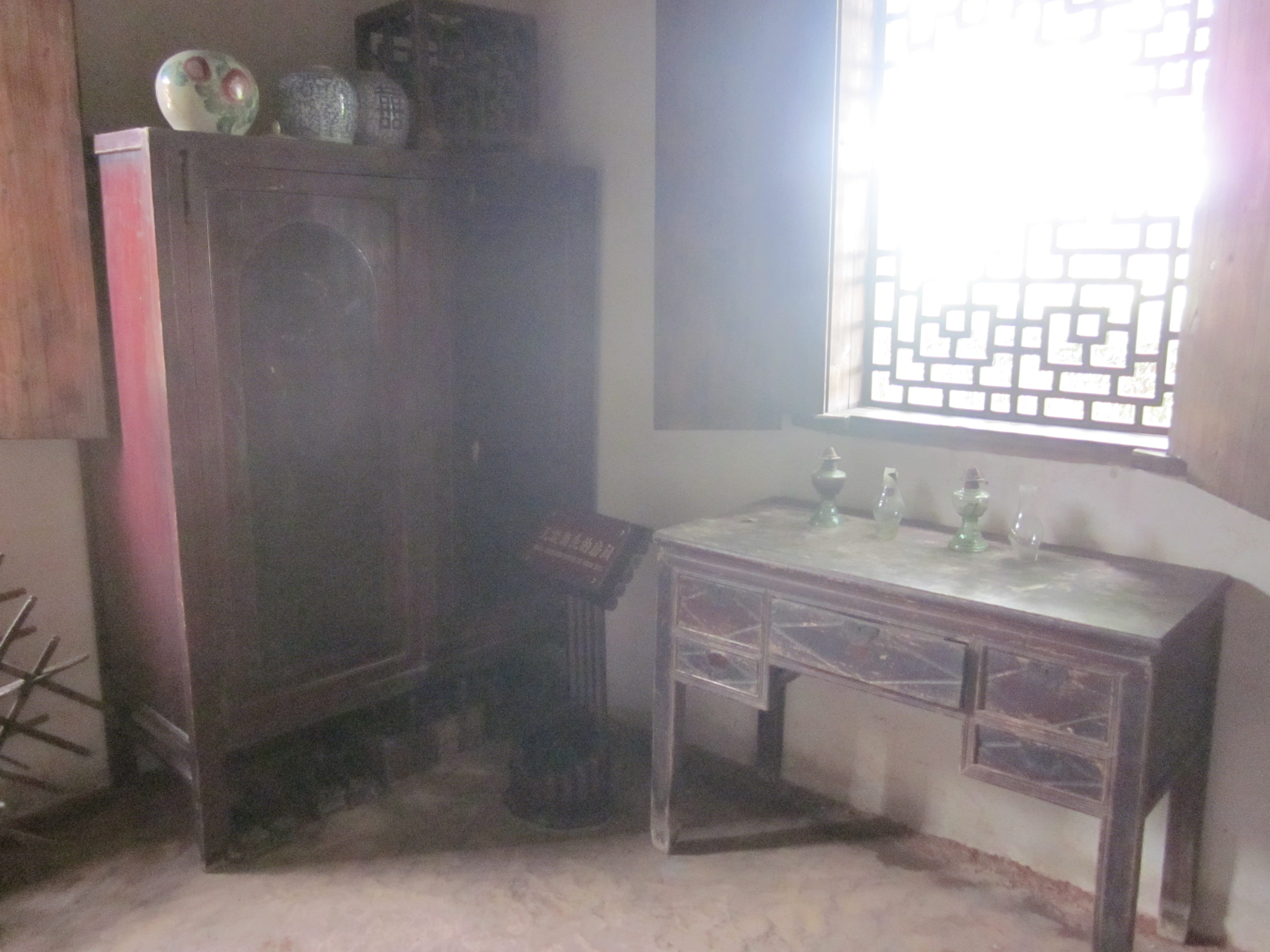
The house.

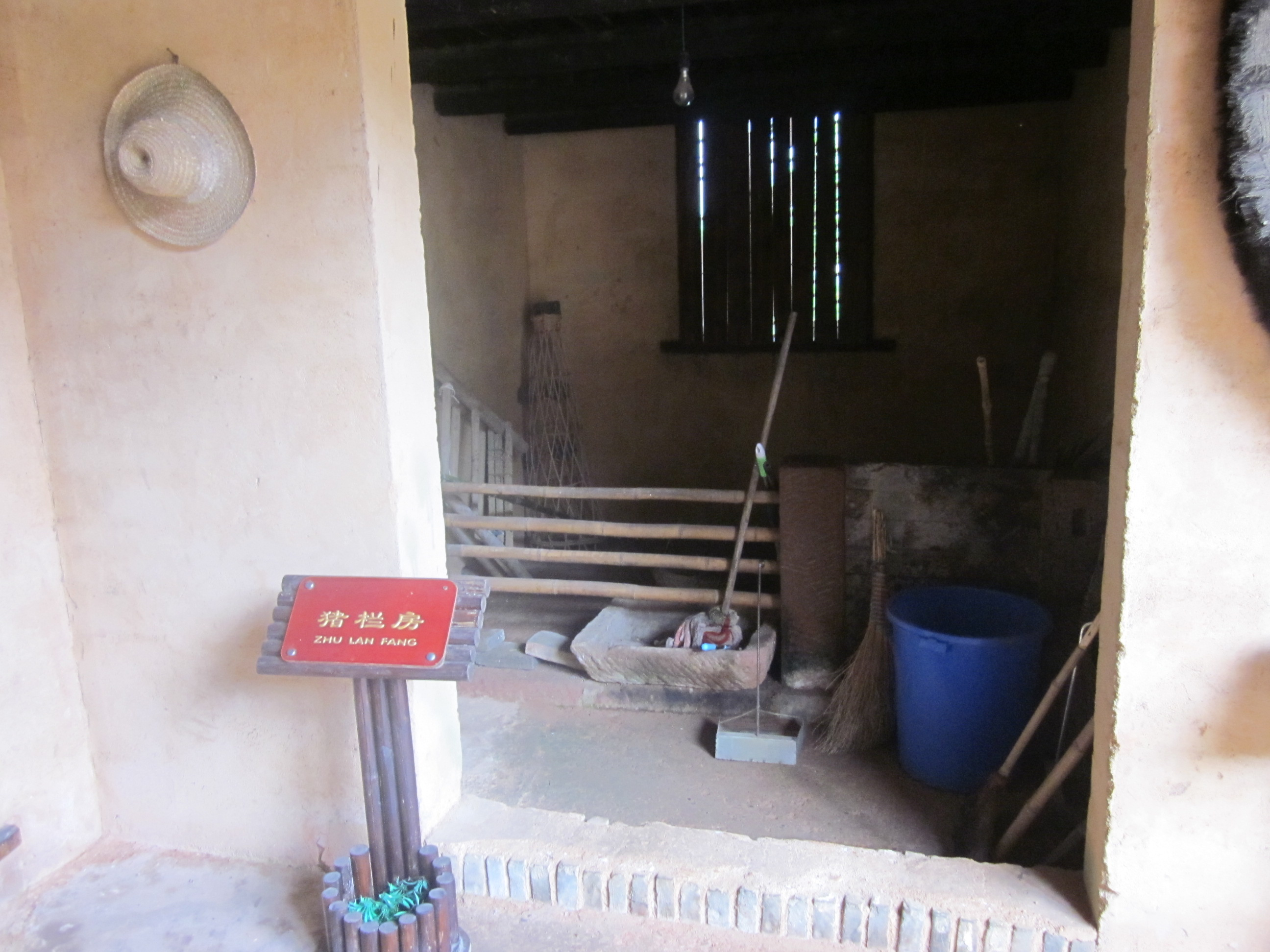
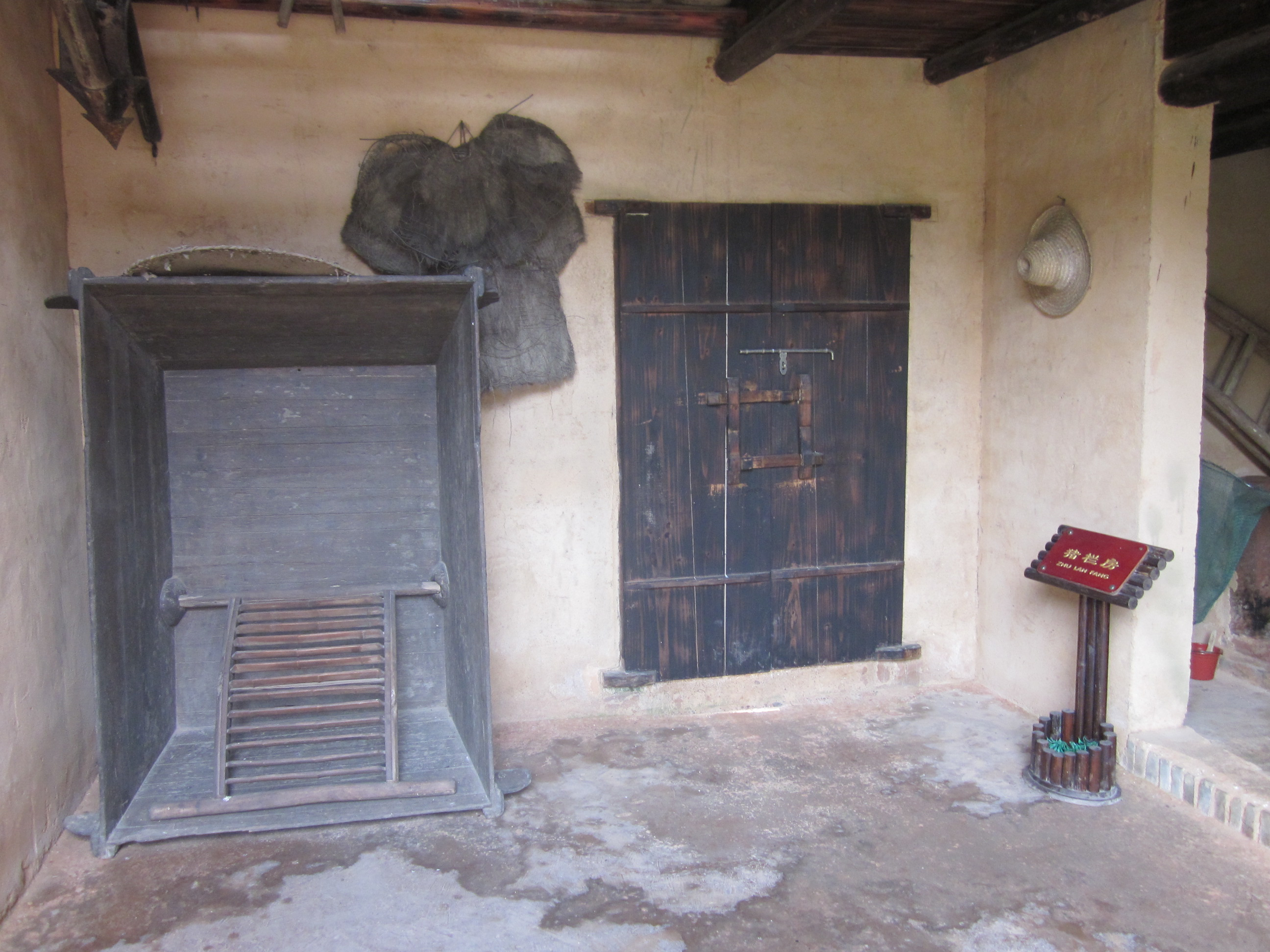
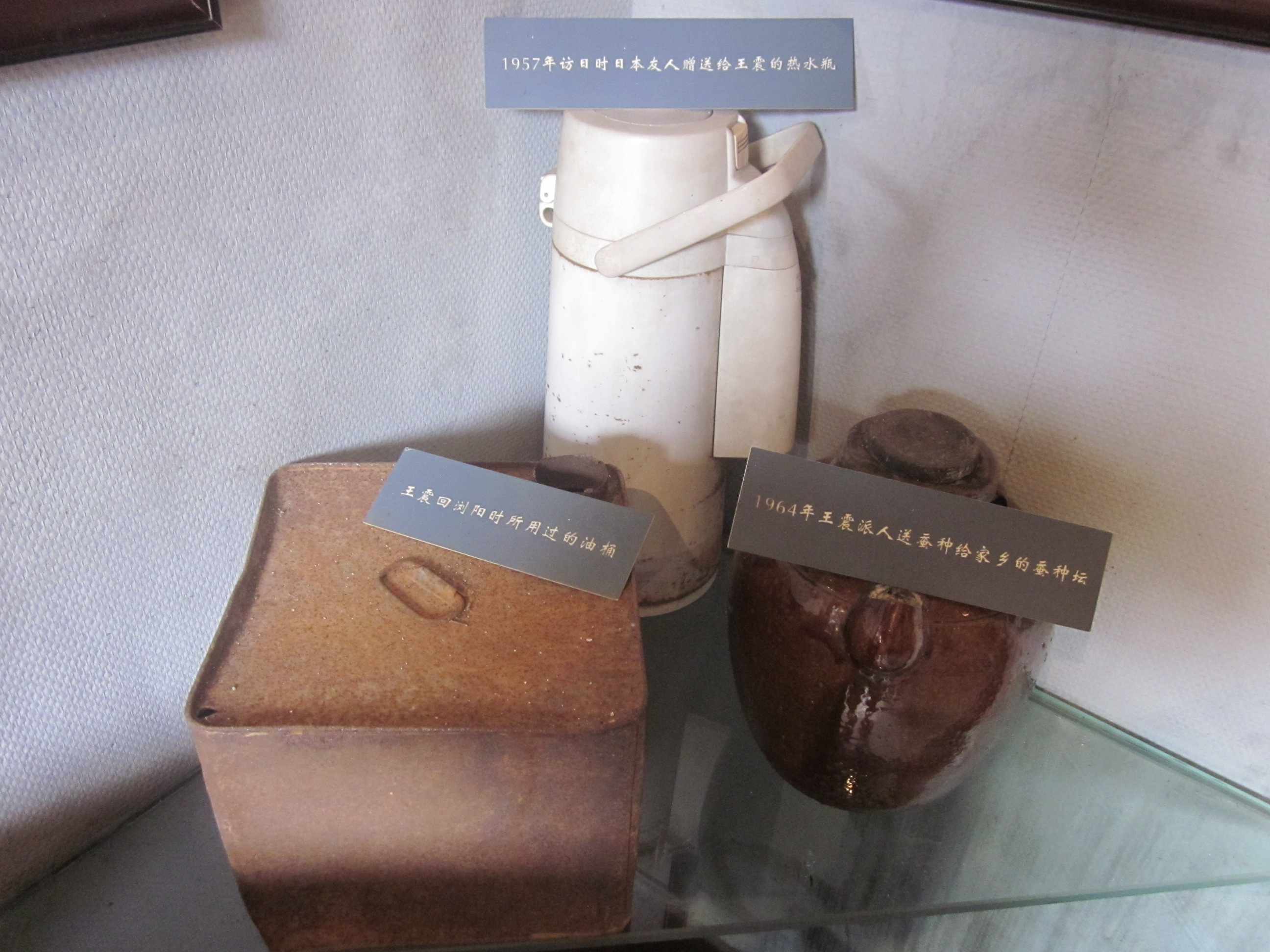
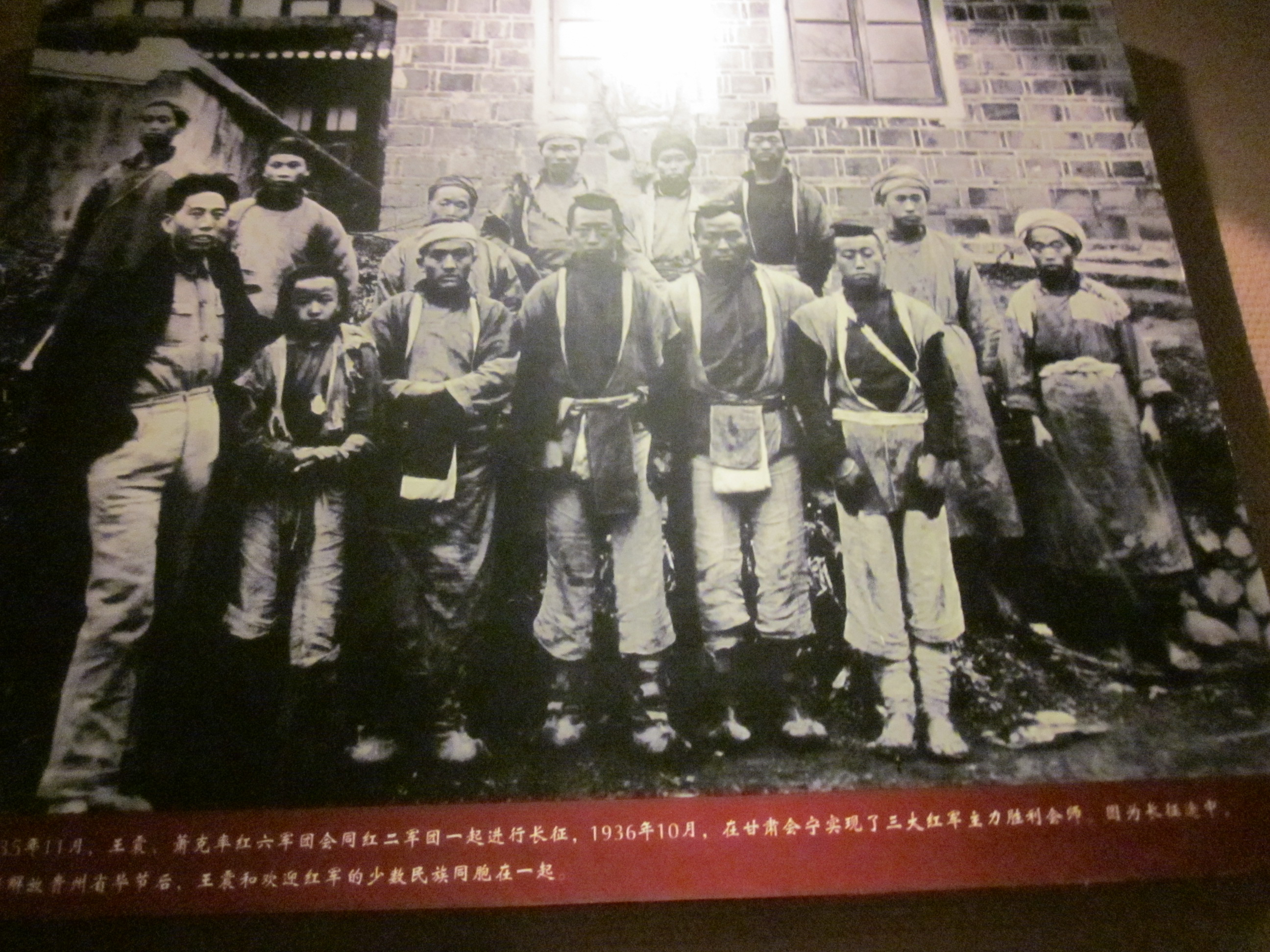
