= Zhang Hanxin =

Chinese scientist (1936–2021)

- 张涵信
- Born: 1 January 1936; Pei County, Jiangsu, Republic of China
- Died: 1 October 2021 (aged 85); Beijing, People's Republic of China
- Education: Tsinghua University
- Scientific career
- Fields: Fluid mechanics
- Workplaces: Institute of Mechanics, Chinese Academy of Sciences
- Academic advisors: Guo Yonghuai

Chinese name
- Simplified Chinese: 张涵信
- Traditional Chinese: 張涵信
Transcriptions
Standard Mandarin
- Hanyu Pinyin: Zhāng Hánxìn

Zhang Hanxin (1 January 1936 – 1 October 2021) was a Chinese scientist specializing in fluid mechanics, and an academician of the Chinese Academy of Sciences. He was chairman of Chinese Aerodynamics Research Society.

== Biography ==
Zhang was born in Pei County, Jiangsu, on 1 January 1936, during the Republic of China. He secondary studied at Xuzhou No. 2 High School. In 1954, he enrolled at Tsinghua University, majoring in the Department of Hydraulic Engineering. In 1963, he did his postgraduate work at the Institute of Mechanics, Chinese Academy of Sciences under the supervision of Guo Yonghuai. At the same time, he taught at Tsinghua University. In 1972, he was despatched to the China Aerodynamics Research and Development Center as a researcher.

On 1 October 2021, he died from an illness in Beijing, aged 85.

== Honours and awards ==
- 1991 Member of the Chinese Academy of Sciences

Awards
New title	Recipient of the Zhou Peiyuan Mechanics Award; 1997	Succeeded by Bai Yilong
