= The Cradling Arm =

2013 painting by Zhang Yan

- Artist: Zhang Yan
- Year: 2013
- Medium: Oil on canvas
- Dimensions: 153 cm × 133 cm (60 in × 52 in)
- Location: Vatican Museums; Vatican City

The Cradling Arm (2013) is an oil painting created by Zhang Yan. The painting vividly depicts a little girl's happiness and contentment in the embrace and protection of her mother, Mother Earth and the motherland. It is permanently collected by the Vatican Museums in May 2017.

== Background ==
In 1992, Zhang Yan, who loves art, went to Tibet and lived there for five years, traveling around the area to experience the culture, nature, and religion. These experiences and his struggles inspired him to create The Cradling Arm.

== Description ==
Showered in the first rays of the morning sun, a Tibetan girl nestles herself in her mother's arm. The mother's arms superimpose a landscape of the ups and downs of the Gangdisi Mountains, as the brightly colored scarf tassels superimpose the breathtaking view of the first rays of the morning sun over the summit of the Mount Kailash, resembling the sacredness, greatness and power of the Mother Earth. Under the reflections of the bright scarf and sheepskin coat, the little girl's innocent look with her ‘plateau red’ cheeks and adorable eyes presents to viewers the unique qualities of innocence, sanctity and confidence of the Tibetan people.

== Interpretation ==
The artist adopted a combination of the traditional western oil painting and traditional Chinese fine-brush landscape painting techniques in this realistic oil painting of the ‘Tibetan Plateau showered under the rising sun, as Dolma, a young Tibetan girl nestles herself in her mother’s arms’.

The Cradling Arm is collected by the Vatican Museums permanently in May 2017. It is the first living artist's work permanently preserved by the Vatican Museum.
