= Chen Qizhi =

Chinese politician (1925–2023)

- 陈启智

President of National University of Defense Technology
- In office June 1990 – February 1994
- Preceded by: Zhang Liangqi
- Succeeded by: Guo Guirong

Personal details
- Born: December 1925 Chengdu, Sichuan, China
- Died: January 15, 2023 (aged 97)
- Party: Chinese Communist Party
- Education: National Central University

Military service
- Allegiance: People's Republic of China
- Branch/service: People's Liberation Army Ground Force
- Rank: Lieutenant general
- Scientific career
- Fields: Rocket motor
- Workplaces: National University of Defense Technology

Chinese name
- Simplified Chinese: 陈启智
- Traditional Chinese: 陳啟智
Transcriptions
Standard Mandarin
- Hanyu Pinyin: Chén Qǐzhì

Chen Qizhi (Chinese: 陈启智; December 1925 – 15 January 2023) was a lieutenant general (zhongjiang) of the People's Liberation Army (PLA) who served as president of National University of Defense Technology from 1990 to 1994. He was a delegate to the 4th and 5th National People's Congress.

== Biography ==
Chen was born in Chengdu, Sichuan, in December 1925, during the Republic of China. After graduating from National Central University (now Nanjing University) in 1948, he joined the faculty of PLA Military Engineering College. He joined the Chinese Communist Party (CCP) in 1954. In June 1990, he became president of National University of Defense Technology, and served until February 1994.

Chen was promoted to the rank of major general (shaojiang) in 1988 and lieutenant general (zhongjiang) in 1993.

Chen died on 15 January 2023, at the age of 97.

Educational offices
Preceded by Zhang Liangqi	President of National University of Defense Technology; 1990–1994	Succeeded by Guo Guirong
