= Zhang Jianqi =

- 张建启

Commander of the Jiuquan Satellite Launch Center
- In office 2001–2004
- Preceded by: Liu Mingshan
- Succeeded by: Zhang Yulin

Personal details
- Born: 25 March 1946 (age 80) Cao County, Shandong, Republic of China
- Party: Chinese Communist Party
- Education: Harbin Institute of Military Engineering

Military service
- Allegiance: People's Republic of China
- Branch/service: People's Liberation Army Ground Force
- Years of service: ?–2009
- Rank: Lieutenant general

Chinese name
- Simplified Chinese: 张建启
- Traditional Chinese: 張建啟
Transcriptions
Standard Mandarin
- Hanyu Pinyin: Zhāng Jiànqǐ

Zhang Jianqi (Chinese: 张建启; born 25 March 1946) is a lieutenant general (zhongjiang) of the People's Liberation Army (PLA) who served as commander of the Jiuquan Satellite Launch Center from 2001 to 2004.

== Biography ==
Zhang was born into a poor peasant family in Cao County, Shandong, on 25 March 1946. In 1964, he was admitted to Harbin Institute of Military Engineering, majoring in nuclear physics. After graduation in 1970, he was assigned to Jiuquan Satellite Launch Center. In 1997, he became deputy commander of the Jiuquan Satellite Launch Center, rising to commander in 2001. He became deputy director of the People's Liberation Army General Armaments Department in 2004, serving in the post until his retirement in July 2009.

Military offices
Preceded by Liu Mingshan (刘明山)	Commander of the Jiuquan Satellite Launch Center; 2001–2004	Succeeded by Zhang Yulin
