= Taipingqiao, Liuyang =

Urban town in Liuyang, Hunan, China

Coordinates: 28.1271°N 113.5457°E

Taipingqiao Town (simplified Chinese: 太平桥镇; traditional Chinese: 太平橋鎮; pinyin: Taipingqiao Zhen) is an urban town in Liuyang City, Changsha City, Hunan Province, People's Republic of China. As of the 2000 census it had a population of 20,129 and an area of 99.8 square kilometers. Taipingqiao town merged to Jili subdistrict on November 18, 2015.

== Cityscape ==
The town is divided into 4 villages and 2 communities, the following areas: Taiping Community, Jinmei Community, Tangjiayuan Village, Hongyuan Village, Xingzhen Village, and Hesheng Village (太平社区和锦美社区，唐家园村、宏源村、星镇村和合盛村).
