= Zhang Yan (major general) =

- 张衍

President of National University of Defense Technology
- In office September 1978 – December 1983
- Preceded by: Liu Juying
- Succeeded by: Zhang Liangqi

Personal details
- Born: Zhang Jiankai; 1917 Lingbi County, Anhui, Republic of China
- Died: 2003 (aged 85–86) Beijing, People's Republic of China
- Party: Chinese Communist Party
- Education: Counter-Japanese Military and Political University

Military service
- Allegiance: People's Republic of China
- Branch/service: People's Liberation Army Ground Force
- Years of service: 1937–1998
- Rank: Major general
- Battles/wars: Second Sino-Japanese War; Chinese Civil War
- Awards: Order of Independence and Freedom (2nd Class) Order of Liberation (1st Class)

Chinese name
- Simplified Chinese: 张衍
- Traditional Chinese: 張衍
Transcriptions
Standard Mandarin
- Hanyu Pinyin: Zhāng Yǎn

Zhang Jiankai
- Simplified Chinese: 张剑凯
- Traditional Chinese: 張劍凱
Transcriptions
Standard Mandarin
- Hanyu Pinyin: Zhāng Jiànkǎi

Zhang Yan (Chinese: 张衍; 1917 – 3 August 2003) was a major general (shaojiang) of the People's Liberation Army (PLA) who served as president of the National University of Defense Technology from 1978 to 1983. He was a member of the 6th and 7th National Committee of the Chinese People's Political Consultative Conference.

== Biography ==
Zhang was born Zhang Jiankai (张剑凯) in Lingbi County, Anhui, in 1917, while his ancestral home was in Tengzhou, Shandong. In 1928, he attended Liji Primary School (李集小学). Influenced by teacher and Communist Wang Jianmin (王健民), he joined the Student Counter Japanese Volunteer Army. In 1937, he was admitted to Counter-Japanese Military and Political University. He joined the Chinese Communist Party (CCP) in February 1938. He fought under Liu Bocheng and Deng Xiaoping at the Battle of North Henan in 1943 during the Second Sino-Japanese War. In September 1948, he became deputy director of the Political Department of Zhongyuan Military and Political University, he remained at there until June 1949, when he took office as director of the Propaganda and Education Division of the Political Department of the Second Field Army Military and Political University.

After the founding of the Communist State in 1949, Zhang participated in the preparatory work of Harbin Institute of Military Engineering and served as director of its Political Department. He was promoted to the rank of major general (Shaojiang) in 1961. In October 1965, he was made political commissar of Xi'an Military Telecommunication Engineering College. During the Cultural Revolution, he was brought to be persecuted and suffered political persecution. He was named party secretary of Northwest Institute of Telecommunication Engineering in October 1973 and then party secretary of the Tenth Research Institute of the Ministry of Defense in July 1976. In July 1977, he became deputy director of the State Planning Commission. In September 1978, he was appointed president of National University of Defense Technology, and served until December 1983, when he was transferred to the Central Military Commission. He retired in July 1998. On 3 August 2003, he died from an illness in Beijing, aged 86.

Military offices
Preceded by Liu Juying	President of National University of Defense Technology; 1978–1983	Succeeded by Zhang Liangqi
