= Zhang Yan (oil painter) =

Chinese oil painter and film director (born 1963)

- Born: November 18, 1963 (age 62); Neijiang, Sichuan, China
- Occupations: Artist, director
- Writing career
- Genre: Oil Painting
- Subject: Tibetan Paintings

Chinese name
- Simplified Chinese: 张焰
Transcriptions
Standard Mandarin
- Hanyu Pinyin: Zhāng Yàn
- Website: www.getarts.cn

Zhang Yan (Chinese: 张焰; born 18 November 1963) is a Chinese oil painter, documentary director. Two of his paintings, Iron Staff Lama (1993) and The Cradling Arm (2013), are collected by the Vatican Museums. These are the first living artist's works, which are permanently preserved by the Vatican Museum.

== Life ==
Zhang Yan was born in 1963 in Neijiang, Sichuan, China. He began to study Chinese painting at the age of 12 and began to study Western painting at the age of 17.

He worked as a documentary director during 1992 to 2002. In 1992, he worked in the editorial department of Tibet TV Station, where he was committed to studying Tibetan culture and history as well as local Buddhism. When he came back to Beijing in 1997, he joined the CCTV News Review Department, as the director of “The Time and Space of the East, the Son of the East” column. He participated in “The 72-hour Hong Kong Return Program” in Hong Kong. In the following year, his two documentaries participated in the Hungarian International Television Festival.

In 2001, he worked for “The Exploring and Discovery” column and produced the documentary China Train. And also he participated in the joint live telecast with the National Geographic Channel “Ancient Civilization and New Discovery, the Archaeology Action of Egyptian Pyramids” column. In 2005, Zhang Yan, as a reporter from the CCTV "Walking Through China" column, made a special trip to the Memorial Hall of the Victims of the Nanjing Massacre in the invasion of China, and filmed the feature film "The Memorial Hall for the Victims of the Nanjing Massacre in the Invading China".

As an artist, his two paintings were collected by the Vatican Museums permanently in 2017. The two oil paintings are Iron Staff Lama(1993) and The Cradling Arm(2013). Pope Francis collected his charcoal strokes painting “Snow Saint” and hung it up in his living room. Zhang Yan has opened an egalitarian and profound cultural dialogue between Eastern and Western civilizations. In 2018, he was ranked number 18 on the Chinese contemporary art list. In 2019, his work "Prayer" was exhibited at Trump National Golf Club, New Jersey, USA.
