= China Aerodynamics Research and Development Center =

China Aerodynamics Research and Development Center (CARDC) (simplified Chinese: 中国空气动力研究与发展中心; traditional Chinese: 中國空氣動力研究與發展中心; pinyin: Zhōngguó Kōngqì Dònglì Yánjiū yǔ Fāzhǎn Zhōngxīn) was founded in 1968. It is the largest research and testing institute of aerodynamics in China, involved in the development of hypersonic missile technology. The center is located in Mianyang City, Sichuan Province. Currently there are more than 1,600 scientists and technicians working there.

The center has been on the United States Department of Commerce's Entity List since 1999.
