= National University of Defense Technology =

Public research military university in Changsha, China

Coordinates: 28.2192°N 112.9904°E

- 中国人民解放军国防科技大学
- Former names: Military Academy of Engineering (1953–1970); Changsha Institute of Technology (1970–1978)
- Motto: 厚德博学、强军兴国
- Motto in English: Excel in Virtue and Knowledge; Strengthen the Armed Forces and the Nation
- Type: Public research university
- Established: 1953; 73 years ago (predecessor); 1978; 48 years ago (current entity)
- Founders: Chen Geng (Harbin Military Academy of Engineering); Deng Xiaoping (current entity)
- Parent institution: Central Military Commission
- President: Lt. Gen. Li Xiang (2019–present)
- Vice-Chancellor: Maj. Gen. Ling Shiming; Maj. Gen. Wu Jianjun
- Faculty: 2,000 faculty members
- Students: 15,700
- Undergraduates: 8,900
- Postgraduates: 6,800
- Location: Changsha, China
- Website: nudt.edu.cn english.nudt.edu.cn

Chinese name
- Simplified Chinese: 国防科技大学
- Traditional Chinese: 國防科技大學
Transcriptions
Standard Mandarin
- Hanyu Pinyin: Guófáng KēJì Dàxué

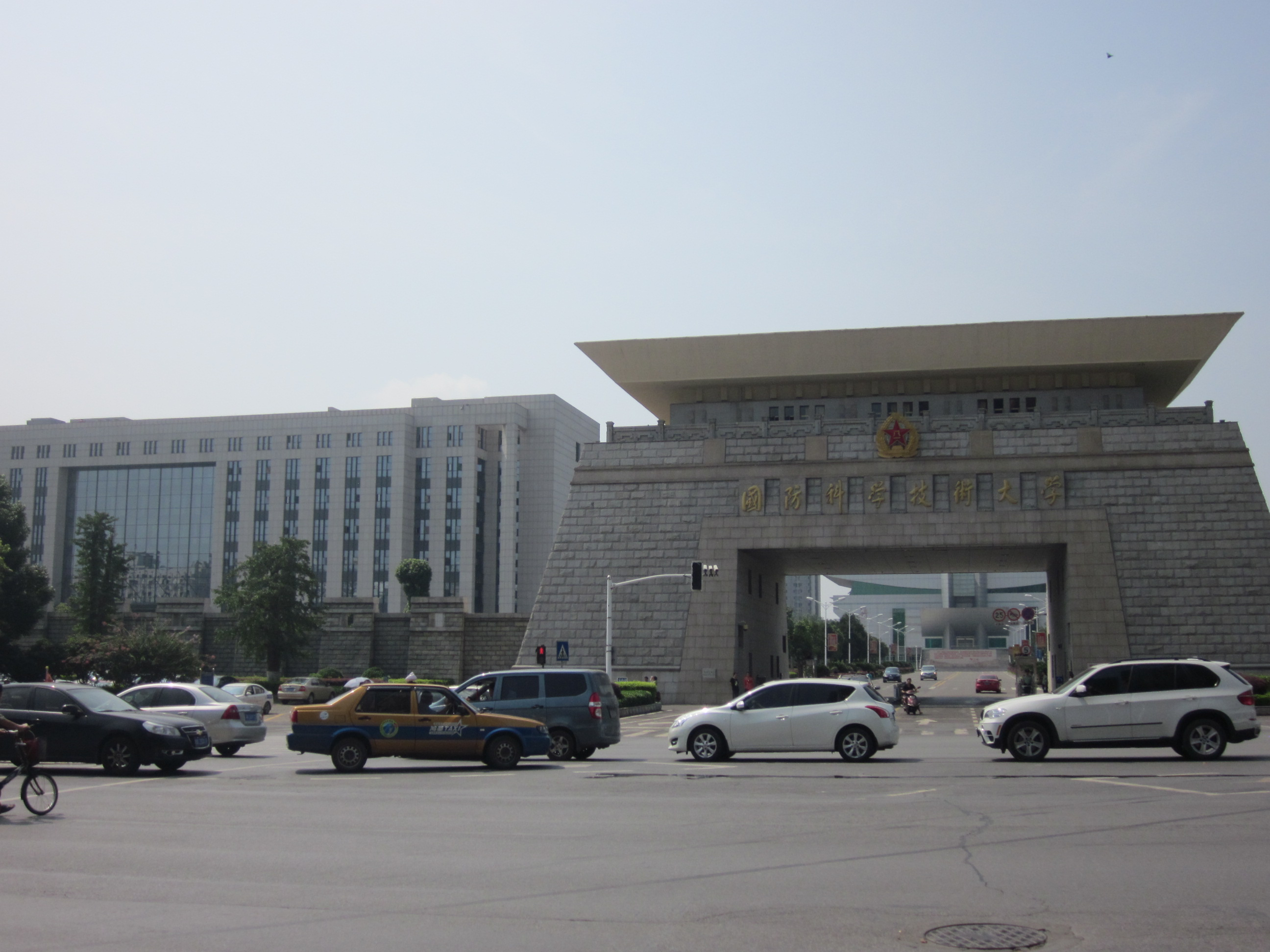
The gate of National University of Defense Technology

The National University of Defense Technology (NUDT; 中国人民解放军国防科技大学) is a national public research university headquartered in Kaifu, Changsha, Hunan, China. It is affiliated with the Central Military Commission. The university is part of Project 211, Project 985, and the Double First-Class Construction. With the predecessor founded in 1953 as the People's Liberation Army Military Academy of Engineering (中国人民解放军军事工程学院) in Harbin, the institution was officially established in 1978 in Changsha, Hunan.

NUDT was instrumental in the development of the Tianhe-2 supercomputer. In 2017, the university incorporated five military colleges, which are the PLA College of International Relations, the PLA College of National Defense Information, the PLA Xi'an Telecommunication College, the PLA College of Electronic Engineering, and the PLA Science and Engineering University College of Meteorology and Oceanography.

Due to its military nature and lack of public information, NUDT has not been ranked or ranked accurately or adequately. Considered the No.1 military academy in China, NUDT has been consistently called the "Military Tsinghua" (Tsinghua being the highest ranked science and technology-focused university in China). In a 2016 Chinese ranking, NUDT was ranked as one of the only four "Seven Star" universities in China (others include Peking University, Tsinghua University, and the Chinese Academy of Science).

== History ==
On 18 March 1952, as part of the development of the first five-year plan, Acting-Chief-of-Staff Nie Rongzhen and Deputy-Chief-of-Staff Su Yu presented the "Report on the Establishment of the Military Engineering Academy" to the Chairman Mao Zedong and Central Military Commission. Mao officially approved the review on March 26, establishing the project as one of the 156 national projects started under the Central Committee of the Chinese Communist Party's 1st five-year plan.

=== Harbin Military Academy of Engineering ===
On July 11, Chairman Mao Zedong appointed Grand General Chen Geng as the first dean and president. On August 22, the CMC established the Military Academy of Engineering Preparatory Committee, and established an office at No. 59 Gongjian Alley in Beijing on September 1. The preparatory committee composed of Grand General Chen Geng as Committee Chairman, Xu Lixing as Vice Chairman, Li Maozhi, Zhang Yan, Huang Jingwen, Hu Xiangjiu, Zhang Shuzu, Ren Xinmin, Shen Zhenggong, and Zhao Zili. On September 16, 1952, the CMC General Political Department approved the establishment of the Provisional Communist Party Committee within the Preparatory Committee with Grand General Chen Geng as the interim party secretary and consisting of Xu Lixing, Li Maozhi, Zhang Yan, Hu Xiangjiu, and Huang Jingwen. On November 24, the CMC granted final approval for the academy and issued to the entire army "instructions for the transfer of 300 teaching assistants and 1,000 cadets to the Military Engineering Academy." The same day, the preparatory committee submitted a preliminary plan for school building to the Central Military Committee.

On June 3, 1952, CCP Premier Zhou Enlai wrote to the Vice Chairman Nikolai Bulganin of the Council of Ministers of the Soviet Union asking for consultants and experts to help establish the new Military Academy of Engineering. On May 13, 1953, a Soviet advisory group arrived. After the establishment of the institute, more than 300 Soviet experts in various fields participated in the construction of the institute. This relation continued until the breakdown in Sino-Soviet relations in the 1960s. As part of the establishment, the Central Military Commission used volunteers from the 3rd Army Corps, the Second Advanced Infantry School of the Southwest Military Region and the Military Science Research Office of East China Military Region. Upon completion, the training of military science and technology talent was extended to all service branches.

On December 15, 1952, the Central Military Commission approved the establishment of the Military Academy of Engineering Construction Committee. On January 30, 1953, the CMC General Political Department approved the Communist Party Committee of the Academy of Military Engineering. On February 21, 1953, the Central Military Commission placed the Academy of Military Engineering under its direct leadership. On April 25, construction began. On May 15, 1953, Chairman Mao Zedong ordered a limit of 800 maximum graduating students per year. On August 26, 1953, Mao Zedong issued the instructions for the establishment of the Military Academy of Engineering and the first semester, and wrote the registration for it.

On 1 September 1953, the Military Academy of Engineering opened its doors, with the opening ceremony attended by the Deputy Chief-of-Staff Zhang Zongxun. Zhou Enlai, Zhu De, He Long, Liu Bocheng, Luo Ronghuan and others wrote inscriptions for the college. The academy consisted of 6 departments, 5 colleges, 22 junior colleges, and 24 undergraduate majors. The colleges were 1st Air Force Engineering, 2nd Artillery Engineering, 3rd Naval Engineering, 4th Armored Force Engineering and 5th Corps of Engineers.

On 1 September 1955, the academy curricula was changed to five years. At the same time, the Ministry of Science and Education issued "Interim Regulations (Draft) for Postgraduate Classes" as part of the development of the academy's graduate program.

The university was founded as the premier military academy of China. It had five departments and one prep department at the time of its founding, including departments of The departments of Chemical Warfare and Nuclear Warfare were established later.

During the Cultural Revolution, the university was transitioned to the Committee of National Defense Science and Technology, and was renamed Harbin Academy of Engineering in 1966. In 1970, the main body of the university including its central administration and 4 departments moved to Changsha in South-Central China due to the possible war with the Soviet Union, and was renamed Changsha Institute of Technology. Other departments were converted to at least five independent national universities, or taken by other national universities or science research institute. The university's name was changed to People's Liberation Army National University of Defense Technology in 1978 after the Cultural Revolution was over.

In 2017, as part of the massive military reforms, the PLA Electronic Engineering Institute, PLA Institute of International Relations, PLA National Defense Information Institute, PLA Xi'an Institute of Communication and The Institute of Meteorology and Oceanography of the University of Science and Technology were consolidated under the NUDT.

In 2015, the United States Department of Commerce added NUDT to the Bureau of Industry and Security's Entity List.

== Campus ==
NUDT is located in the urban area of Changsha, capital of Hunan Province in South-Central China, covering a total area of 373 hectares, or 922 acres.

== Administration ==
- President: Lt. Gen. Deng Xiaogang, Academician of the Chinese Academy of Sciences
- Political Commissar: Lt. Gen. Liu Nianguang

== Academics ==
The university consists of 11 colleges administering over 40 departments, institutes and laboratories, four national key laboratories and one key laboratory at the Ministry of Education level.

The 11 colleges of the university include:

- College of Liberal Arts and Sciences
- College of Systems Engineering
- College of Computer Science and Technology
- College of Electronic Engineering
- College of Electronic Science and Technology
- College of Meteorology and Oceanography
- College of Advanced Interdisciplinary Studies
- College of Information and Communication
- College of Intelligence Science and Technology
- College of Aerospace Science and Engineering
- College of International Studies

== Statistics ==
Currently, NUDT has over 2,000 faculty members, over 300 of whom are professors. There are 14,000 full-time students including 8,400 undergraduates and 5,600 graduates. NUDT offers 25 subjects for undergraduates, 112 programs for master's degree candidates, and 69 programs for PhD candidates. 11 post-doctoral research stations have been authorized on campus.

== NUDT supercomputers ==
Yinhe-I (YH-I)

Yinhe-1 was developed in 1983 as the leading supercomputer in China with a performance level of 100 MFLOPS.

Yinhe-II (YH-II)

Yinhe-II was built in 1992 achieving performance of 1 GFLOPS.

Yinhe-III

Yinhe-II was upgraded to Yinhe-III in 1996 which achieves 13 GFLOPS.

Tianhe-I

Tianhe-I was first revealed to the public on 29 October 2009, and was immediately ranked as the world's fifth fastest supercomputer in the TOP500 list released at the 2009 Supercomputing Conference (SC09) held in Portland, Oregon, on 16 November 2009.

Tianhe-IA

In October 2010, Tianhe-IA, an upgraded supercomputer achieving a performance level of 2.57 PFLOPS, was unveiled at HPC 2010 China and ranked as the world's fastest supercomputer in the TOP500 list.

In November 2011, the Tianhe-1A ranked as the second fastest supercomputer in the world on TOP500 after it was surpassed by K Computer by Fujitsu of Japan.

Tianhe-2

Tianhe-2 was the fastest supercomputer in the world from 2013 to 2016, when it was surpassed by the Sunway TaihuLight at the Chinese National Supercomputing Center.

Tianhe-2A

Tianhe-2A is currently ranked as the world's fourth fastest supercomputer on the TOP500 list, having achieved a performance level of 61.44 PFLOPS.

== See also ==
- Academic institutions of the armed forces of China
- TOP500
- HPC Challenge Benchmark
- Supercomputer centers in China
