= 2020–2021 China–India skirmishes order of battle: China =

The Chinese order of battle in the 2020–2021 China–India skirmishes.

== Background ==
CCP General Secretary and CMC Chairman	Xi Jinping
Commander of the Western Theater Command	Zhao Zongqi (Until Dec 2020) Zhang Xudong
Deputy Commander of the Western Theater Command	Wang Qiang
Theatre Command HQ	Chengdu
Ground Forces, HQ	Lanzhou, Gansu

Prior deployment in Eastern Ladakh included 362nd and 363rd Border Defence Regiments. Companies from 362nd were stationed at Khurnak Fort and Spanggur Tso. 363rd have companies at Kongka La near Gogra/Hot Springs.A patrol boat squadron is deployed on Pangong Tso. 362nd and 363rd occupied pickets as the skirmishes progressed.

In April 2020, the 4th (Highland) Motorised Infantry and 6th (Highland) Mechanised Infantry Divisions of the Western Theatre Command took part in pre-planned annual exercises in the Gobi desert and Aksai Chin. Following this the divisions moved towards the Line of Actual Control (LAC) in eastern Ladakh. The divisions stayed in eastern Ladakh from May 2020 to February 2021 following which they rotated with the 8th and the 11th Motorised Divisions. A total of 90% of China's deployment in Ladakh is rotated. Amidst the standoff, military in Xinjiang has undergone modernisation.

== 6th Mechanised Infantry Division ==
- People's Liberation Army Ground Force
  - 6th Highland Mechanised Infantry Division at Depsang Plains.
    - Two mechanised infantry regiments/brigades
      - 7th Mechanised Infantry Regiment
      - 18th Mechanised Infantry Regiment
      - One armoured regiment
      - Combat support includes a field artillery regiment, air defence regiment, combat engineer battalion, electronic warfare battalion, CBRN defence battalion, divisional reconnaissance battalion
        - Each mechanised infantry regiment/brigade has four mechanised battalions
          - A tank battalion
          - Artillery battalion
          - Combat support is provided by an engineer battalion and a signal battalion
      - Anti-Aircraft Artillery Regiment
        - A battalion of 24 GZ-09 PGZ-07
        - A battalion of 18 HQ-17 systems
        - Six FN-6
      - Aviation regiment
        - Squadron of Harbin Z-9G and Mi-17I

== 4th Motorised Infantry Division ==
- People's Liberation Army Ground Force
  - 4th Highland Motorised Infantry Division at Galwan Valley, Hot Springs and Pangong Tso.
    - 11th Motorised Infantry Regiment following standard table of organisation
    - 12th Motorised Infantry Regiment
    - A tank regiment, artillery regiment
      - Anti-tank, anti-aircraft artillery battalions
    - Type 86 ICVs, WZ-551, 6 x 6 APCs, VN-1 8 x 8 APCs with Red Arrow 10
  - Army Groups providing the following support:
    - Artillery brigade
      - Two battalions of PCL-181
      - Two battalions of PHL-03
      - A battalion of twin-barreled 35mm towed anti-aircraft guns
      - Twelve FM-90

== PLA Air Force ==
- PLA Air Force
  - 6th Fighter Division, Yinchuan, Ningxia
    - Regiment of J-11 Shenyang
    - Regiment of Chengdu J-7
    - Regiment of Chengdu J-7Es
  - 33rd and 37th Fighter Division, Chongqing and Urumqi
  - Bomber and transport division, Lintong and Qionglai

== See also ==
- Chinese People's Volunteer Army order of battle
