= Lanzhou Military Region =

Former military region of China

- Lanzhou Military Region (highlighted)
- Simplified Chinese: 兰州军区
- Traditional Chinese: 蘭州軍區
Transcriptions
Standard Mandarin
- Hanyu Pinyin: Lánzhōu Jūnqū

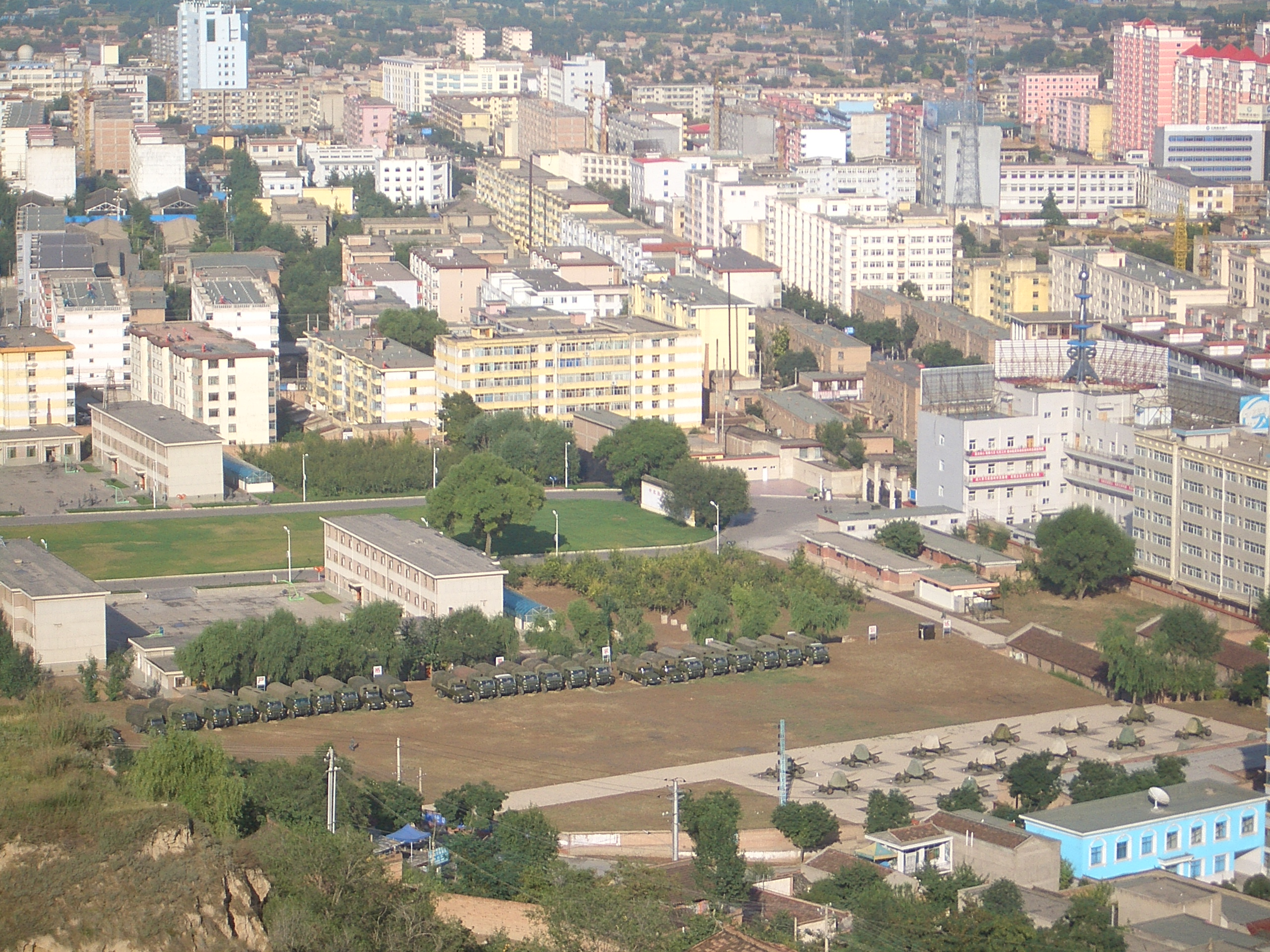
The garrison in Linxia City, Gansu

The Lanzhou Military Region was one of seven military regions in the People's Republic of China. It directed all People's Liberation Army and People's Armed Police forces in Xinjiang, Qinghai, Gansu, Ningxia, Shaanxi, and Ngari Prefecture in northwest Tibet. It was headquartered in Lanzhou in Gansu Province. It is bordered to the south by the Chengdu Military Region, and to the north by Mongolia, the Altai Republic, which is a political subdivision of the Russian Federation, and Kazakhstan. This region is now part of the Western Theater Command and Central Theater Command due to the military reforms of 2015.

In 2006 the International Institute for Strategic Studies attributed the Region with an estimated 220,000 personnel, a single armoured division, two motorised infantry divisions, one artillery division, one armoured, two motorised infantry, one artillery, one anti-aircraft brigades plus a single anti-tank regiment.

The Region included two Group Armies (the 21st at Baoji and the 47th at Lintong) plus two Armed Police Units (the 7th and 63rd). The known smaller formations included the 12th Armoured Brigade ('84701 Unit') at Jiuquan, Gansu. The region also included the Xinjiang Military District, unusual among PRC military districts in that it contains a significant number of combat troops (the 4th Infantry Division, 6th Infantry Division, 8th Infantry Division, and, apparently, the 11th Highland Motorised Infantry Division reportedly either at Urumqi or in the Karakoram Mountains (Blasko 2000).

The first, longest-serving and most influential Commander of the Region was Lieutenant General Zhang Dazhi, who held the post from 1955 to 1969, and then went on to become Central Commander of the PLA Artillery Forces from 1969 to 1977. In October 2012 Liu Yuejun was named commander of the Lanzhou Military Region. Yuejun became commander of the new Eastern Theater Command on February 1, 2016. From 2014 Liu Lei was the Lanzhou MR Political Commissar.

Organizations affiliated with the Lanzhou Military Region often used the nickname "combat" (Chinese: 战斗; pinyin: zhàndòu; lit. 'battle fight'), including the Combat Performance Troupe (Chinese: 战斗文工团), but not the People's Army Newspaper (Chinese: 人民军队报), which was the sole exception among all five major military region newspapers in this regard.

== Tentative order of battle ==
In December 1949, when the Xinjiang (Provincial) Military Region was established, it directed three 'third-class' military regions (sanji junqu); Dihua (Urumchi), where the 6th Corps was based, Yining, the base for the 5th Corps, and Kashgar, the location of the 2nd Corps. The 2nd Cavalry Division (III Formation) was stationed in the region between October 1962 and 1969.

On November 6, 1951, Headquarters, 6th Corps was converted to Air Force Command, Northwestern Military Region. In June 1952 the corps was formally disbanded. The 16th Division was reorganized as the 5th Xinjiang Agriculture Construction Division and the 17th Division as the 6th Xinjiang Agriculture Construction Division.

Headquarters is located at Lanzhou

- 21st Group Army, Baoji, Shaanxi
  - 61st Motorised Infantry Division (“Red Army Division”), Tianshui, Gansu
  - 12th Armoured Brigade, Jiuquan, Gansu
  - Artillery Brigade (Blasko 2013 now lists Yinchuan, Ningxia)
  - Air Defence Brigade (Blasko lists only Gansu; other sources say Linxia, Gansu)
  - 'Tiger' Special Operations Dadui (Blasko 2013 lists a location)
- 47th Group Army, Lintong, Shaanxi
  - 55th Motorized Infantry Brigade, Zhangye, Gansu
  - 56th Motorized Infantry Brigade (Blasko 2006 lists no location; 2013 state Wuwei, Gansu). Between 2006 and 2013 Blasko moved his listing for this brigade from the 21st Group Army to the 47th Group Army.
  - 139th Mechanized Infantry Brigade, Weinan, Shaanxi (reduced from division status)
  - 9th Armoured Brigade, Chengcheng, Shaanxi
  - 1st Artillery Brigade, Yongdeng, Gansu
  - Anti-Aircraft Brigade
  - Communications Regiment
  - Engineer Regiment

Scramble.nl says the 3rd Army Aviation Brigade (Wujiaqu) is part of the 47th Group Army.

12th Artillery Division was previously with 47th Group Army.

- Xinjiang Military District (HQ Ürümqi)
  - 4th Motorized Infantry Division (Kuqa)
  - 6th Mechanized Infantry Division (Kashgar)
  - 8th Motorized Infantry Division (Tacheng)
  - 11th Motorized Infantry Division (Urumqi)
  - two artillery brigades (Ürümqi County?)
- 63rd Armed Police Division (People's Republic of China) (Pingliang) (formerly 21 Army 63 Division)
- 7th Armed Police Division (Ili Kazakh Autonomous Prefecture) (former Xinjiang Military District 7th Division)

== Lanzhou Military Region Air Force ==
There are apparently command posts at Xi'an and Urumqi. In December 1964, the 9th Air Corps (kong 9 jun) was established in Wulumuqi [Ürümqi], but changed to the Xinjiang MRAF Command Post (junqu kongjun zhihuisuo) in November 1978. On 16 April 1979, it again changed its name to the Wulumuqi MRAF Command Post (junqu kongjun zhihuisuo). Other divisions associated with the 9th Air Corps include the 37th Fighter Division. The division was established in August 1966, and stationed at Ürümqi, Xinjiang.

Main source for this listing is Scramble.nl/cn.htm, accessed May 2012.

- 6th Fighter Division
  - 16th Air Regiment (Yinchuan) (Su-27)
  - 18th Air Regiment (Lintao) (J-7)
  - Air Regiment (Jiuquan) (J-7, JJ-7A) - the Lanzhou MR Training Base was formed from 46th Div. In April 2012 this regiment was re-subordinated to 6th Division.
- 36th Bomber Division
  - 107th Air Regiment (Lintong) (H-6)
  - 108th Air Regiment (Wugong) (H-6E/F, H-6M)
- Urumqi Base
  - 111th Brigade (Korla-Xinhiang) (J-11s) - 111th Regiment, 37th Fighter Division became a brigade in 2012, according to Scramble.nl/cn.htm.
  - Brigade (Urumqi-South) (JH-7) - ex 110th Air Regiment, 37th Division.
  - Brigade (Malan/Uxxaktal) (JJ-7A) - until 1988 the regiment operated as 16th Division based at Ertaizi, after which it was transformed into Shenyang Military Region Training Base. JJ-7A aircraft were declared operational in July 2011. April 2012 the regiment changed into a brigade and got subordinated to Urumqi Base and moved to Malan.
  - Brigade (Changji) (J-8F, JJ-7A) - the regiment used J5 and later J6 until 2002 when J8Hs arrived. These were replaced by J8F in 2006. In 2008 the regiment moved from Kuerla, north of the city. In 2012 37th Div/109th Reg turned into a brigade.
- 5th Flying Academy
  - 1st Regiment, 5th Flying Academy (Hami)
  - 2nd Regiment, 5th Flying Academy (Zhangye SE)
  - 3rd Regiment, 5th Flying Academy (Wuwei)
- Independent (Aerial Survey) Regiment (Hanzhong-Chenggu) (Y-8, An-30, Y-12)

The 6th Fighter Division was formed in November 1950 at Anshan. It originally consisted of the 16th, 17th, and 18th Regiments. China-Military.org indicates that the 6th Division gained the 139th Regiment from the deactivated 47th Division sometime in 1998. The 106th Air Regiment of the 36th Bomber Division disbanded in 2004.
