= Wang Jianmin (lieutenant general) =

Chinese lieutenant general

- 王建民

Deputy Political Commissar of the Lanzhou Military Region
- In office July 2013 – December 2014
- Preceded by: Li Guohui
- Succeeded by: Shi Xiao

Political Commissar of the Xinjiang Military District
- In office December 2009 – July 2013
- Preceded by: Tian Xiusi
- Succeeded by: Liu Lei

Personal details
- Born: November 1951 (age 74) Qingyang, Gansu, China
- Party: Chinese Communist Party

Military service
- Allegiance: China
- Branch/service: People's Liberation Army
- Years of service: ?–2014
- Rank: Lieutenant General

Wang Jianmin (Chinese: 王建民; born November 1951) is a retired lieutenant general (zhong jiang) of the People's Liberation Army (PLA) of China. He served as a Deputy Political Commissar of the Lanzhou Military Region and Political Commissar of the Xinjiang Military District.

== Biography ==
Wang was born in November 1951 in Qingyang, Gansu province. He spent most his career in the Lanzhou Military Region as a political officer. In 2009, he succeeded Tian Xiusi as Political Commissar of the Xinjiang Military District, which is under the Lanzhou MR. Wang attained the rank of lieutenant general in 2011. In July 2013, he succeeded the retiring lieutenant general Li Guohui as Deputy Political Commissar of the Lanzhou Military Region.

In December 2014, Wang retired after reaching 63, the mandatory retirement age for deputy military region chief-level commanders. About the same time, Fan Changmi, the other deputy political commissar of the Lanzhou MR, was dismissed and placed under investigation for corruption. They were replaced by two lieutenant generals transferred from other military regions: Shi Xiao from the Chengdu Military Region and Kang Chunyuan from the Beijing Military Region.
