= Yinchuan Helanshan Airport =

Airport in People's Republic of China

Yinchuan Helenshan Airport

Site information
- Type: Military airport

Location
- Coordinates: 38.4822°N 106.0094°E

Site history
- Built: 1970

Garrison information
- Occupants: 6th Fighter Division

Yinchuan Helanshan Airport (IATA: YEH) (simplified Chinese: 银川贺兰山机场; traditional Chinese: 銀川賀蘭山機場; pinyin: Yínchuān Hèlánshān Jīchǎng) is an airport in Yinchuan, Ningxia, China. The airport is mostly a military field.

== History ==
Yinchuan Helanshan Airport began construction in 1970 due to national military needs, however the site was located close to the Western Xia Imperial Tombs area in the Helan Mountain. The 47th Air Division was also established there, and based in a camp located close to the tomb. In 1972, while the airport was still under construction, excavation works at the site unearthed pottery artifacts. They were reported to the local cultural relics bureau, however it was only then that the awareness of the significance of the Western Xia Tombs began to emerge. In 2015, following a national effort to protect cultural relics and apply for World Heritage status, the airport and camp buildings had to be requisition, relocated, and demolished. As a result, the entire camp was relocated one kilometer south, to a new location west of the Xigan Canal and north of South Ring Expressway in Xixia District. It was located on the southern side of the airport, further from the Western Xia Tombs. Shortly thereafter, the old barracks and camp of the airport were demolished, along with the 47th Division. By March 2015, the old camp area was fully demolished and handed over to the 6th Fighter Division, which began operating the newly built camp and airport facilities.

=== Present ===
During the 2021 Western Joint Exercises, the Chengdu J-20 made its first appearance over the airport. The military exercise was held between China and Russia which aimed to deepen joint anti-terrorism operations between the Chinese and Russian militaries.

== See also ==
- List of airports in the People's Republic of China
