= 1st Garrison Division of Lanzhou Military Region (2nd Formation) =

2nd Cavalry Division (1962–69) 20th Army Division (1969–83) 1st Garrison Division of Lanzhou Military Region (1983–85)
- Active: October 1962 - October 1985
- Country: People's Republic of China
- Branch: People's Liberation Army Ground Force
- Type: Division
- Role: Cavalry, Infantry, Garrison
- Part of: Lanzhou Military Region
- Garrison/HQ: Shizuishan, Ningxia

2nd Cavalry Division(Chinese: 骑兵第2师)(3rd formation) was formed in October 1962 from 4th and 5th Cavalry Regiment from 1st Cavalry Division, and 6th and 7th Independent Cavalry Regiment of Lanzhou Military Region.

The division was under direct control of Lanzhou Military Region. From 1962 to 1969 the division was composed of:

- 4th Cavalry Regiment;
- 5th Cavalry Regiment;
- 6th Cavalry Regiment;
- 7th Cavalry Regiment.

In October 1969 7th Cavalry Regiment was detached from the division, and 2nd Independent Infantry Regiment of Gansu Provincial Military District attached, and the division was re-organized to an army division, catalogue A and renamed as 20th Army Division(Chinese: 陆军第20师), and its structure was re-organized as follows:

- 58th Infantry Regiment (former 2nd Independent Infantry Regiment of Gansu);
- 59th Infantry Regiment (former 4th Cavalry);
- 60th Infantry Regiment (former 5th Cavalry);
- Artillery Regiment(former 6th Cavalry).

The division then moved to Shizuishan, Ningxia.

In January 1983 the division was re-organized and renamed as 1st Garrison Division of Lanzhou Military Region(Chinese: 兰州军区守备第1师)(2nd formation). By then the division was composed of:

- 1st Garrison Regiment (former 58th Infantry);
- 2nd Garrison Regiment (former 59th Infantry);
- 3rd Garrison Regiment (former 60th Infantry);
- Artillery Regiment.

In October 1985 the division was disbanded. Its division HQ were converted to HQ Tank Brigade, 47th Army.
