= Wang Jianmin =

Wang Jianmin may refer to:

- Wang Jianmin (full general), former commander of the PLA Nanjing Military Region
- Wang Jianmin (lieutenant general), former deputy political commissar of the PLA Lanzhou Military Region
- Chien-Ming Wang or Wang Jianmin, Taiwanese baseball player
- David C. Wang or Wang Jianmin (王建民), President of Boeing China
