= Chen Hui =

Chen Hui, may refer to:

- Xuanzang, born Chen Hui or Chen Yi (陳褘 / 陳禕), a 7th-century Chinese Buddhist monk, scholar, traveller, and translator.
- Chen Hui (general) (陈辉), a general in the People's Liberation Army of China, currently serving as political commissar of the People's Liberation Army Ground Force.
