= Liu Lei =

- 刘雷

Political Commissar of the PLA Ground Force
- In office December 2015 – January 2022
- Preceded by: New position
- Succeeded by: Qin Shutong

Political Commissar of the Lanzhou Military Region
- In office December 2014 – December 2015
- Preceded by: Miao Hua
- Succeeded by: Post abolished

Political Commissar of the Xinjiang Military District
- In office July 2013 – December 2014
- Preceded by: Wang Jianmin
- Succeeded by: Li Wei

Personal details
- Born: February 1957 (age 69) Liaocheng, Shandong, China
- Party: Chinese Communist Party
- Education: PLA National Defence University; Chinese Academy of Sciences

Military service
- Allegiance: China
- Branch/service: People's Liberation Army Ground Force
- Years of service: 1973–2022
- Rank: General

Chinese name
- Simplified Chinese: 刘雷
- Traditional Chinese: 劉雷
Transcriptions
Standard Mandarin
- Hanyu Pinyin: Liú Léi

Liu Lei (Chinese: 刘雷; born February 1957) is a general of the Chinese People's Liberation Army (PLA). He has been Political Commissar of the PLA Ground Force since December 2015, and formerly served as Political Commissar of the Lanzhou Military Region and the Xinjiang Military District.

== Biography ==
Liu Lei was born in February 1957 in Liaocheng, Shandong province. He joined the PLA in 1973 at age 16. In the 1990s, he graduated from the joint combat commander training program of the PLA National Defence University. He also studied at the graduate school of the Chinese Academy of Sciences and holds a doctoral degree.

Liu has served in the Lanzhou Military Region for more than 40 years, including many years in the 21st Group Army. In June 2003, he became Director of the Political Department of the Nanjiang (Southern Xinjiang) Military District. He attained the rank of major general in July 2004. In January 2007, he became Political Commissar of the 21st Army. He was appointed Political Commissar of the Xinjiang Military District, which is under the Lanzhou MR, in July 2013.

In November 2013, six days after a suicide attack on Beijing's Tiananmen Square, thought to be perpetrated by Uyghurs from Xinjiang, Commander Peng Yong of the Xinjiang MD was removed from the Xinjiang Uygur Autonomous Regional Committee of the Chinese Communist Party, and replaced by Liu Lei.

Liu attained the rank of lieutenant general (zhongjiang) in July 2014, and was promoted to Political Commissar of the Lanzhou Military Region in December 2014, replacing Miao Hua, who had been promoted to Political Commissar of the PLA Navy. Major General Li Wei succeeded Liu as Political Commissar of the Xinjiang MD. In December 2015, he was made the inaugural Political Commissar of People's Liberation Army Ground Force. On July 28, 2017, Liu was promoted to the rank of general (shangjiang).

On 2 March 2026, the fifteenth meeting of the Standing Committee of the 14th National Committee of the Chinese People's Political Consultative Conference (CPPCC) adopted a decision to revoke Liu's membership in the 14th National Committee of the CPPCC and to remove him from his positions as a member of the Standing Committee of the 14th CPPCC National Committee.

Military offices
Preceded by Du Jincai	Political Commissar of the 21st Group Army; 2007–2013	Succeeded by Li Wei
Preceded by Wang Jianmin	Political Commissar of the Xinjiang Military District; 2013–2014	Succeeded by Li Wei
Preceded by Wang Jianmin	Director of the Political Department of the Nanjiang Military District; 2003–2007	Succeeded by Jia Suigang
Preceded by Miao Hua	Political Commissar of the Lanzhou Military Region; 2014–2015	Succeeded by Position revoked
New title	Political Commissar of the People's Liberation Army Ground Force; 2015–2022	Succeeded by Qin Shutong
