= 12th Armoured Brigade =

12th Armoured Brigade may refer to:

- 12th Armored Brigade (People's Republic of China)
- 12th Armoured Brigade (United Kingdom)
- 12th Panzer Brigade, Germany

== See also ==
- 12th Brigade (disambiguation)
