= Urumqi Glacier No.1 =

Glacier in downtown Ürümqi, Xinjiang, China

- Location within Dzungaria
- Interactive map of Urumqi Glacier No.1
- Location: At the North slope of Tiangeer II Peak of Tian Shan, Ürümqi County, Xinjiang, China
- Coordinates: 43°05′N 86°48′E
- Area: 1.068 km^{2} (0.412 mi^{2}) (East branch); 0.578 km^{2} (0.223 mi^{2}) (West branch)
- Length: 2.028 km (1.260 mi) (East branch); 1.714 km (1.065 mi) (West branch)
- Thickness: 133 m (5,200 in) (East branch); 108 m (4,300 in) (West branch)
- Status: Recession since observation

Urumqi Glacier No.1 (Chinese: 乌鲁木齐1号冰川 or 乌鲁木齐一号冰川) or Urumqi River Glacier No.1 (Chinese: 乌鲁木齐河1号冰川 or 乌鲁木齐河一号冰川), Tianshan Glacier No.1 (Chinese: 天山1号冰川 or 天山一号冰川), is the glacier closest to an urban area in the world, located only 120 km southwest to downtown Ürümqi, Xinjiang, China. As a major source of the Urumqi River, Glacier No.1 lies in the north slope of Tiangeer II Peak in the middle section of Tian Shan and it is within Ürümqi County.

== Geography ==
Tianshan Glaciological Station, Chinese Academy of Sciences started observing the glacier change of the glacier since 1959, giving it longer observation history and records than any other glacier in China. Ever since then, the glacier has been continuously retreating. Due to its constant recession, the glacier has been separated into two branches in 1993. The glacier is one of the 'reference glaciers' for mass balance of the World Glacier Monitoring Service (WGMS). In 2019, researchers estimated that the glacier will have disappeared in the next 50 years.

Since 2017, a natural reserve covering an area of 950 km^{2} (370 mi^{2}) has been set up by the Regional Government of Xinjiang to protect Glacier No.1. Besides, tourism surrounding the glacier was banned by the Regional government during the 13th 5-year Plan (2016–2020).

== Observation history ==
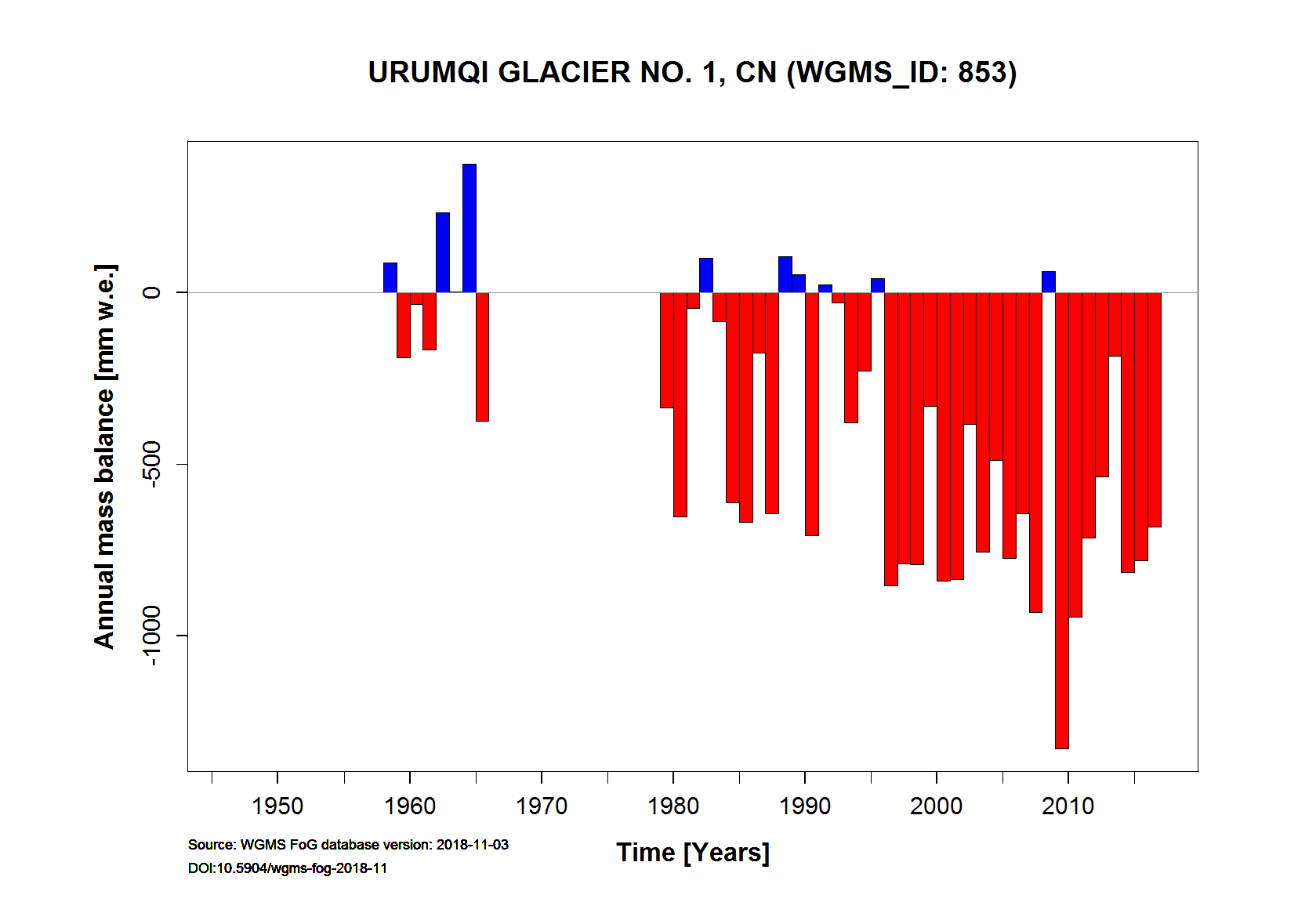
The annual mass balance of Urumqi Glacier No. 1, according to WGMS.

Glacier No.1 has longer observation history and fuller records than any other glacier in China. In June 1958, Daxigou Weather Station was established right below Glacier No.1 at the mountainside of Tiangeer Peak, to measure and analyse the weather conditions in the area. In 1959–60, the research group for the use of mountainous ice and snow, Chinese Academy of Sciences, sent 8 sub-groups to investigate into the glaciers in Tian Shan, during which Tianshan Glaciological Station near Glacier No.1 was set up by Shi Yafeng in 1959. The glacier was first named as Shengli Daban Glacier No.1 before changing to the current name. In 1967–1979, the Cultural Revolution and other factors interrupted the observation. In 1982, the glacier became part of World Glacier Monitoring Service as a reference glacier. In 2010, an observation tower was built in the glacier area. In 2013, the glacier was listed among the sites for Global Cryosphere Watch.

=== Future ===
Several modelling and predictions of Glacier No.1 have been put. Duan et al. (2012) estimated that by 2040, the terminus of a glacier will be retreating at a relatively slow rate but the thickness of the glacier will be significantly reduced, while after 2040, the retreat of the terminus will be speeding up. According to Gao et al. (2018), by 2040, the ice of the glacier will be 1/5 as large as it was in 1980, with the area halved. By 2100, 92% of the glacier area will be gone.

== Protection ==
During Xinjiang's Lianghui session in 2012, Cui Chunyu, Regional People's Representative, proposed an initiative to set up a comprehensive natural protection area covering an area of 240 km^{2} (93 mi^{2}) surrounding Glacier No.1. In 2013, the Regional Environmental Protection Bureau set up a framework for the establishment of such protection area. In April 2014, the Regional Government decided to set up the protection area. In 2017, Project for protection of the ecology of Urumqi rivers and lakes started to be carried out, which included the protection area for Glacier No.1. The whole project cost 560 million RMB, involving 3 counties surrounding the area, covering an area of 950 km^{2} (370 mi^{2}). Plus, the government of Urumqi County has been applying for setting up a new national park.

To reduce human activity near the glacier, tourism surrounding the glacier was banned by the Regional government during the 13th 5-year Plan (2016–2020). Yet, this is challenged by doubt and concerns, for tourism is not the main cause of the glacier retreat but can help people to understand the importance of environmental protection and pollution reduction if well governed.

The grazing industry was relocated to reduce its influence to the glacier, and the herding routes were re-designed. The regulation over the manufacturers and miners was tautened. The number of cars passing through part of National Highway 216 near the glacier was restricted and the construction of a new road to replace the current route that is too close to the glacier is being planned.
