= 1st Division of Xinjiang Production and Construction Corps =

5th Division of PLA (1949–53) 1st Division of XPCC (1953-)
- Active: 1949 - present
- Country: China
- Allegiance: Chinese Communist Party
- Branch: Xinjiang Production and Construction Corps
- Type: Division; Paramilitary organisation State-owned enterprise
- Role: Agricultural Construction Unit
- Part of: Xinjiang Production and Construction Corps (XPCC)
- Headquarters: Aral, Xinjiang
- Engagements: Sino-Japanese War, Chinese Civil War
- Website: www.ale.gov.cn

Commanders
- First Political Commissar: Wu Hongzhan (吴红展) (CCP Secretary of Aksu Prefecture)
- Political Commissar: Ding Yiqiang (丁翊强) (CCP Secretary of Aral)
- Commander: Xiao Yong (肖勇) (Mayor of Aral)

The 1st Division of Xinjiang Production and Construction Corps (Chinese: 新疆生产建设兵团第一师) is a para-military formation of the Xinjiang Uygur Autonomous Region, China.

5th Division (Chinese: 第5师) was activated in February 1949 from 359th Brigade, 2nd Column of the Northwest Field Army. The division commander was Xu Guoxian, and political commissar Li Quan. Its origin could be trace to 6th Army Corps, Chinese Red Army established in August 1933.

By 1949 the division was composed of:

- 13th Regiment (Red Army regiment);
- 14th Regiment;
- 15th Regiment.

In the Sino–Japanese War period, the division and its predecessor troops participated in the Kelan, Shaojiazhuang, Shangxiyaojian and Xiaxiyaojian, Hundred Regiments and other important battles, killing 15977 people. During the Chinese Civil War, in the Central Plains, southwest Shanxi, Fenyang andi Xiaoyi, north Shaanxi three war three victory, Shagudian, Yuncheng, Yichuan, Xifu and east Gansu, north Dali, Fufeng and Meixian and other important battles.

The division moved into Xinjiang in October 1949.

March 1952, 5th Division of the 13th Regiment (Red Army, less 3rd Battalion) absorbed 15th Division of PLA 5th Corps.

In March 1953, the 5th Division reorganized as 1st Xinjiang Agricultural Construction Division (Chinese: 新疆农业建设第1师), the city set up an Aksu Military Sub district offices, 14th Regiment, 15th Regiment, 13th Regiment 3rd Battalion of the 2nd Army Training Corps of the Border Camp combined into 4th Infantry Division 11th Regiment (14th regiment based).

== Hierarchical Superiors ==
- Major general Xu Guoxian, a former China people's Liberation Army Engineering Corps deputy commander.
- Major general Li Quan, former deputy political commissar of the Xinjiang Military Region.
