= Qin Shutong =

Chinese general

- 秦树桐

Political Commissar of the People's Liberation Army Ground Force
- In office January 2022 – December 2024
- Preceded by: Liu Lei
- Succeeded by: Chen Hui

Personal details
- Born: November 1963 (age 62) Tai County, Jiangsu, China
- Party: Chinese Communist Party (expelled in 2025)

Military service
- Allegiance: People's Republic of China
- Branch/service: People's Liberation Army Ground Force
- Years of service: ?–2025
- Rank: General

Chinese name
- Simplified Chinese: 秦树桐
- Traditional Chinese: 秦樹桐
Transcriptions
Standard Mandarin
- Hanyu Pinyin: Qín Shùtóng

Qin Shutong (Chinese: 秦树桐; born November 1963) is a general (shangjiang) of the People's Liberation Army (PLA) who served as political commissar of the People's Liberation Army Ground Force from January 2022 to December 2024. He is a representative of the 19th National Congress of the Chinese Communist Party.

== Biography ==
Qin was born in Tai County (now Jiangyan District), Jiangsu, in November 1963. In March 2013, he became director of Political Department of the 31st Group Army, one year later, he was elevated to deputy political commissar. In September 2015, he was assigned political commissar of the 1st Group Army. He was reassigned as political commissar of the 75th Group Army in March 2017. In April 2018, he was made director of Political Department of the People's Liberation Army Ground Force. In January 2022, he rose to become political commissar of the People's Liberation Army Ground Force, succeeding Liu Lei.

Qin was promoted to the rank of major general (shaojiang) in July 2014, lieutenant general (zhongjiang) in June 2019, and general (shangjiang) in January 2022.

On October 17, 2025, the Ministry of National Defense announced that he was expelled from the CCP and the PLA for "serious violations of discipline and law".

Military offices
Preceded by Bai Lü	Political Commissar of the 1st Group Army; 2015–2017	Succeeded by Position revoked
New title	Political Commissar of the 75th Group Army; 2017–2018	Succeeded by Wei Wenbo (魏文波)
Preceded by Liu Jiaguo	Director of Political Department of the People's Liberation Army Ground Force; 2018–2022	Succeeded by TBA
Preceded by Liu Lei	Political Commissar of the People's Liberation Army Ground Force; 2022–2024	Succeeded by Chen Hui
