= 10th Division (People's Republic of China) =

10th Division (1949–52)
- Active: 1949.2 - 1952.6
- Country: People's Republic of China
- Branch: People's Liberation Army
- Type: Division
- Role: Infantry
- Part of: 4th Corps
- Engagements: Chinese Civil War

The 10th Division (Chinese: 第10师) was created in February 1949 under the Regulation of the Redesignations of All Organizations and Units of the Army, issued by Central Military Commission on November 1, 1948, basing on the 1st Security Brigade, 4th Column of the PLA Northwestern Field Army and 1st Regiment of 6th Cavalry Division. Its history can be traced to the 1st Security Brigade, Stationary Corps of Eighth Route Army, formed in December 1939..

The division was part of 4th Corps. Under the flag of 10th division it took part in the Chinese Civil War. In June 1952 it was disbanded and absorbed into the 11th Division from the same Corps. The division HQ was converted as HQ, 10th Artillery Division.

As of disbandment division was composed of:.

- 28th Regiment;
- 29th Regiment;
- 30th Regiment(later renamed as 30th Regiment, 11th Division).
