= Shenxianwan =

Border outpost in Hotan, Xinjiang, China

- 神仙湾
- Pishan County, Hotan Prefecture, Xinjiang, China

Site information
- Type: Border Outpost
- Controlled by: People's Liberation Army Ground Force

Location
- Coordinates: 35.5688°N 77.8460°E

Site history
- Built: 1950s

Garrison information
- Garrison: 363rd Border Defense Regiment, Xinjiang Military District

Shenxianwan (Chinese: 神仙湾; pinyin: Shénxiān wān; lit. 'fairy bay') is the location of a battalion military post of China to the north of the Karakoram Pass (as part of Pishan County, Hotan Prefecture, Xinjiang). It is in the valley of the Wahab Jilga river, a tributary of the Yarkand River, along the traditional Central Asian caravan route.

== Geography ==
The caravan route between India's Ladakh and China's Xinjiang traditionally passed through the Karakoram Pass and followed the course of the Wahab Jilga river, which rises immediately below the pass. At Aktagh, it used to branch into two routes: one following Wahab Jilga to the Yarkand River, and the other heading to the Suget Pass and Shahidulla. The trade route fell into disuse after the People's Republic of China took control in 1949.

The Shenxianwan post is 7 km below the Karakoram Pass. It is connected to the Xinjiang–Tibet Highway (G219) via Hashen Highway. The road uses the traditional route up to Aktagh, and then follows a route through the Kisilkorum Pass (Kawak Pass) to join the Karakash River valley upstream from Xaidulla.

The road has also been extended up to the Karakoram Pass itself, giving its troops ready access to the pass. In recent years, the troops have been seen going up to the pass for one or two days ad then returning.

== History ==
The Shenxianwan post is believed to have been established sometime in the 1950s. It appears to have been a basic "sentry post". A radio broadcast in the 1990s mentioned that it had only one soldier on duty. Another broadcast mentioned that the sentry posts at such remote locations were now receiving electricity and could dispense with "barn lanterns and candles". Chairman Deng Xiaoping awarded the post the tile of "Karakoram Steel Border Outpost".

After India reactivated an Advanced Landing Ground at Daulat Beg Oldi on its side of the Karakoram Pass, China upgraded the Shenxianwan Post to a full military base. It is now equipped with an iconic observation tower, facilities to hold a battalion of troops, a large dish antenna for satellite communications, and an all-weather road linking to Xaidulla. Satellite imagery picked up by India Today also showed a phased array radar being brought by soldiers to the Karakoram Pass to monitor the activities in the valley towards Daulat Beg Oldi.

In 2021, it was reported that the Xinjiang Military Command stationed a "smart vegetable factory" at Shenxianwan to grow fresh vegetables under computer-controlled conditions, which would be otherwise difficult to grow at this high altitude location.

== Sino-Indian border issues ==
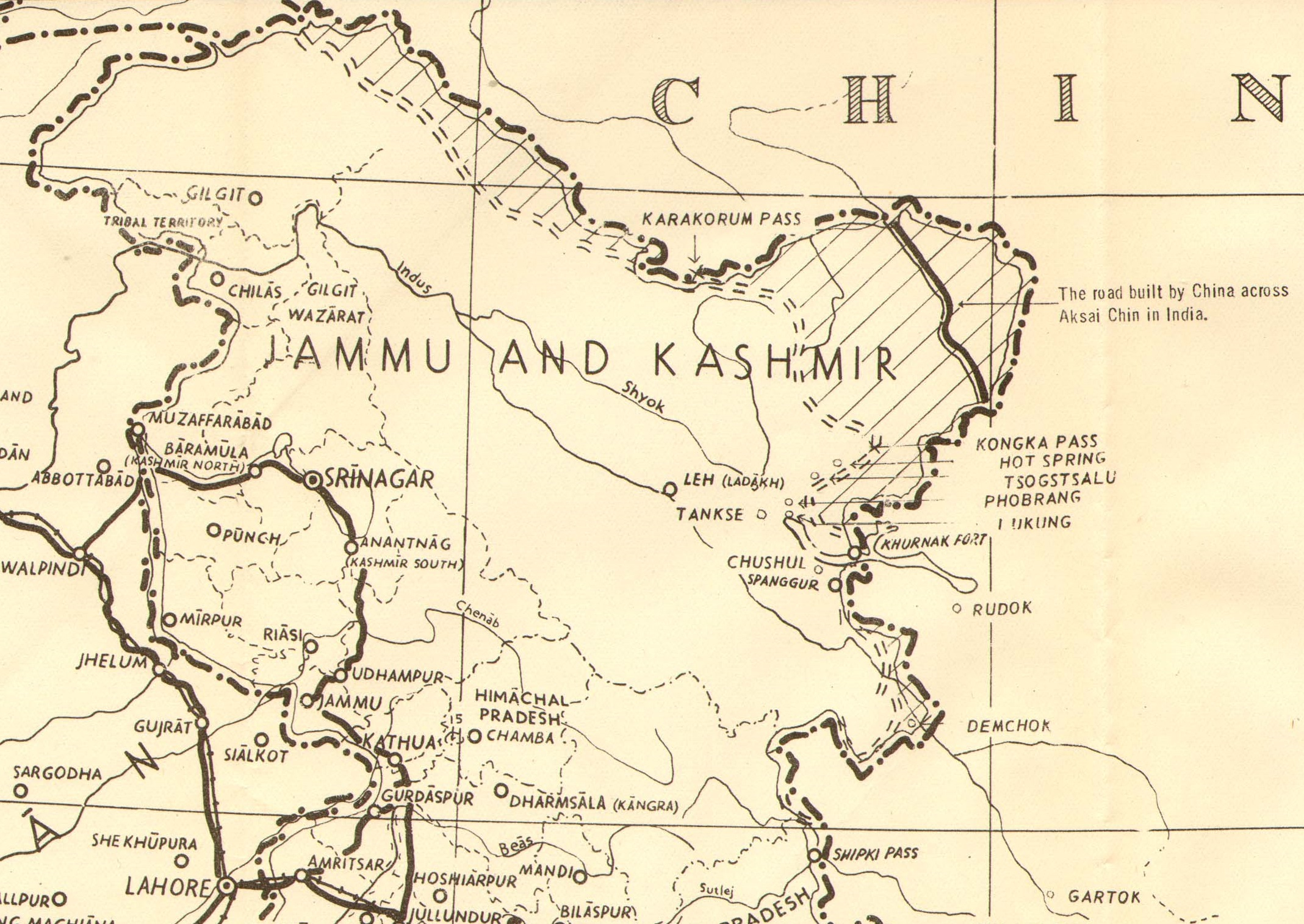
India's 1954 border definition of Jammu and Kashmir

Prior to India's independence, the British defined the northern border of Jammu and Kashmir along Aktagh and the Yarkand River. The location of Shenxianwan was thus included in India.

However, when Independent India defined its borders in 1954, it set them along the Karakoram Range with the Karakoram Pass as the defining landmark. India has never claimed the territory beyond the Karakoram Pass nor made any moves to intrude into it. China's strengthening of the Shenxianwan base is seen as a retaliation for India's Advanced Landing Ground at Daulat Beg Oldi.

== Maps ==
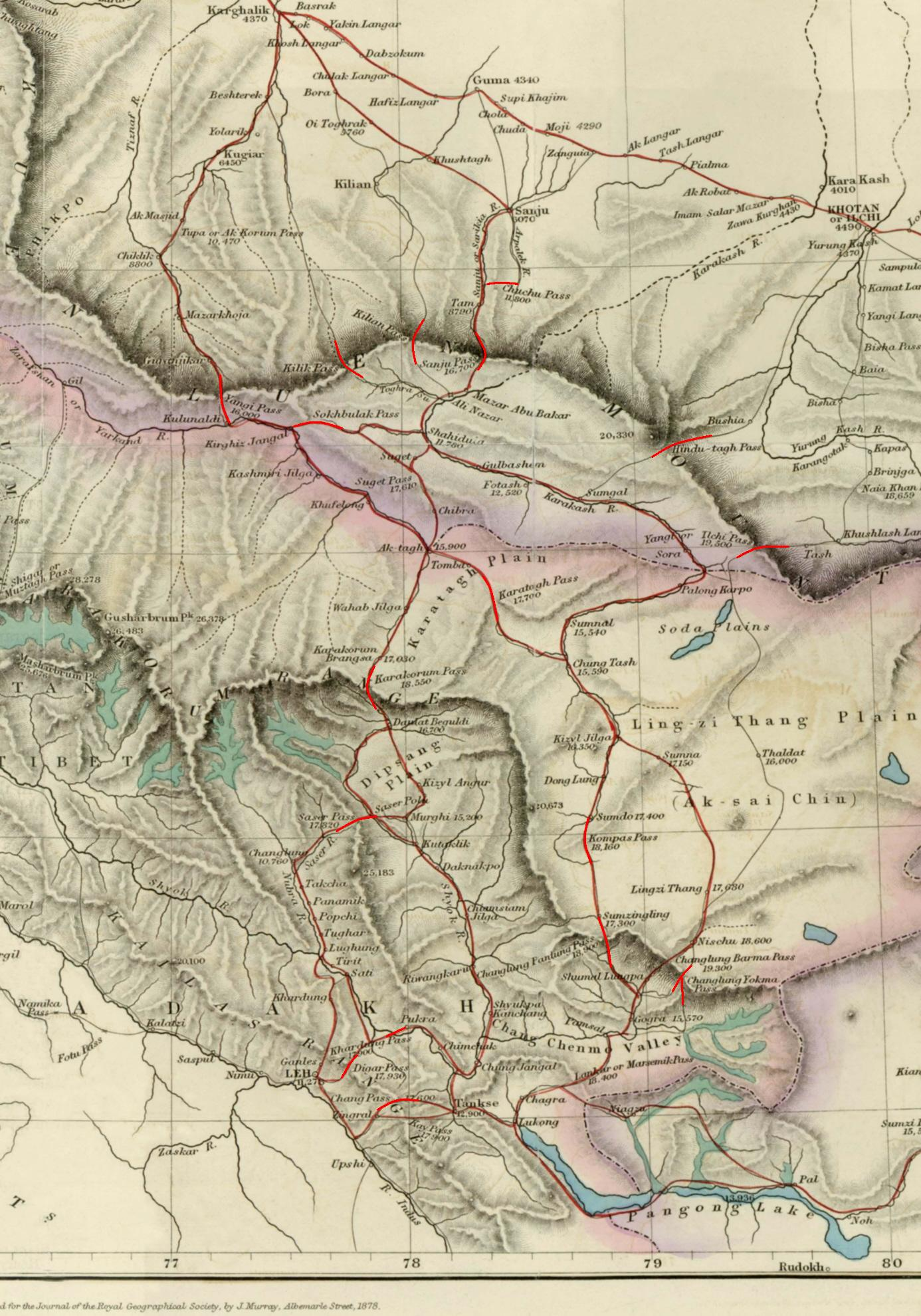
Trade routes between Ladakh and Central Asia

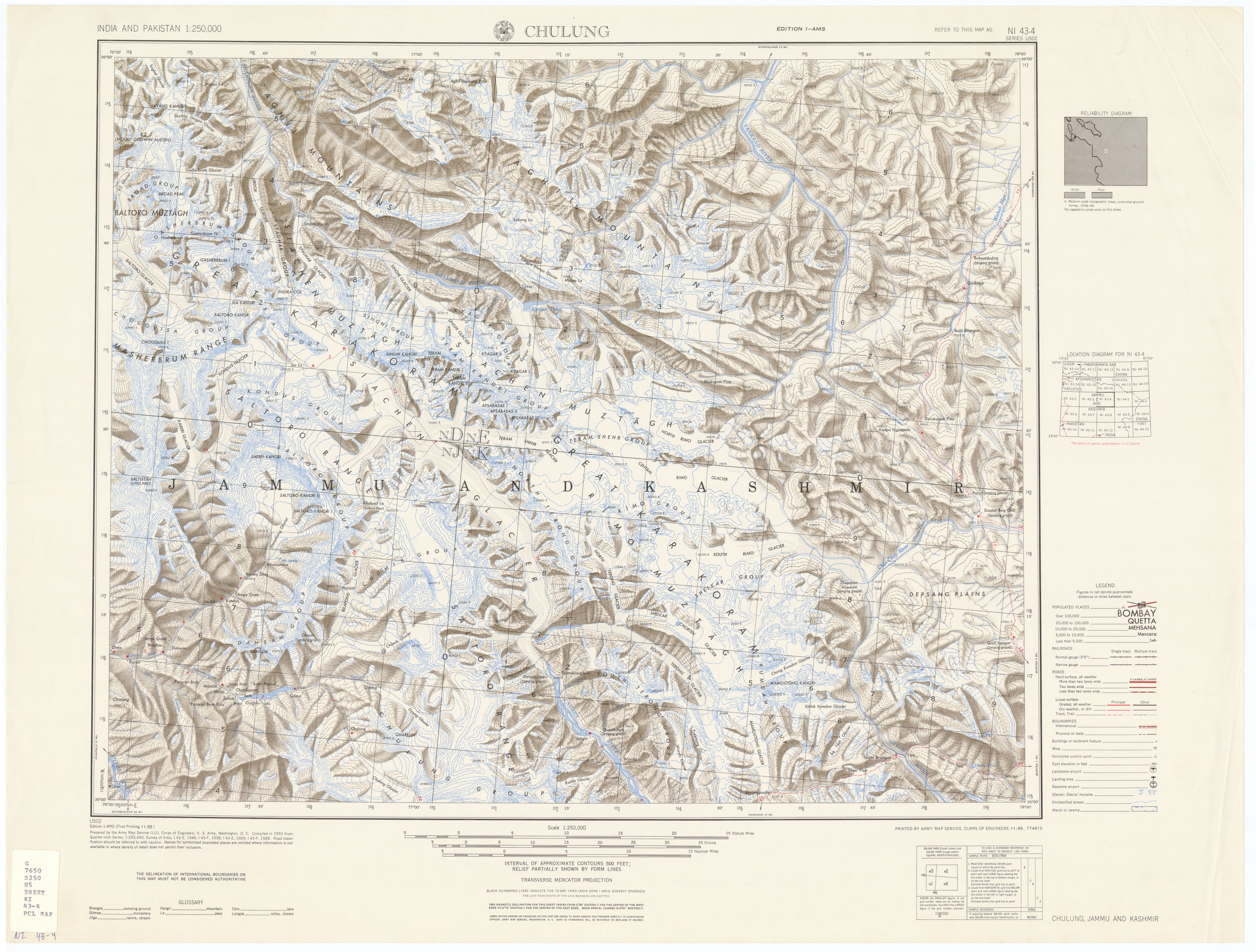
US AMS map NI 43-4 showing the Karakoram Pass and vicinity

== See also ==
- Tianwendian
