= 12th Armored Brigade (People's Republic of China) =

Chinese military unit

12th Tank Division (1969–98) 12th Armored Division (1998–2011) 12th Armored Brigade (2011–17) 12th Heavy Combined Arms Brigade (2017–)
- Chinese: 重型合成第12旅
- Active: 1969 - present
- Country: China
- Allegiance: Chinese Communist Party
- Branch: People's Liberation Army Ground Force
- Type: Combined Arms, Armored
- Size: Brigade
- Part of: 76th Group Army
- Garrison/HQ: Jiuquan, Gansu

The 12th Tank Division (Chinese: 坦克第12师) was formed on October 12, 1969, from 12th Independent Tank Regiment, 264th Tank Self-Propelled Artillery Regiment of Academy of Armored Troops and 2nd Tank School Training Regiment. After its formation the division was soon moved to Jiuquan and Jiayuguan City in Gansu province.

As of December 1969, the division was composed of:

- 45th Tank Regiment (former 12th Independent Tank Regiment);
- 46th Tank Regiment (former 264th Tank Self-Propelled Artillery Regiment);
- 47th Tank Regiment (former 2nd Tank School Training Regiment).

In the early 1970s, the division maintained as a reduced tank division, which consisted of 3 under-equipped tank regiments, under the command of the 19th Army Corps.

Since May 1975 the division was put under the direct command of the Lanzhou Military Region.

Since 1978 the division maintained as a tank division, catalogue B. In December, 46th Tank Regiment exchanged its designation and positions with Tank Regiment, 19th Army Corps.

In July 1983 the Artillery Regiment and the Armored Infantry Regiment were activated.

By then the division was composed of:

- 45th Tank Regiment
- 46th Tank Regiment
- 47th Tank Regiment
- Armored Infantry Regiment
- Artillery Regiment

Since September 1985, the division was attached to the 21st Army. Its Armored Regiment absorbed the 419th Regiment of the 140th Army Division.

In 1998, the division was renamed the 12th Armored Division (Chinese: 装甲第12师). Armored Infantry Regiment was disbanded and absorbed into now armored regiments.

By then the division was composed of:

- 45th Armored Regiment;
- 46th Armored Regiment;
- 47th Armored Regiment;
- Artillery Regiment.

In late 2011 the division was split into two: the division itself became 12th Armored Brigade (Chinese: 装甲第12旅), while half of its battalions formed the 62nd Mechanized Infantry Brigade.

In 2017 the brigade was reorganized as the 12th Heavy Combined Arms Brigade (Chinese: 重型合成第12旅).
