= Chen Hui (general) =

Chinese general (born 1963)

- 陈辉

Political Commissar of the People's Liberation Army Ground Force
- Incumbent
- Assumed office December 2024
- Preceded by: Qin Shutong

Political Commissar of the People's Liberation Army Aerospace Force
- In office April 2024 – December 2024
- Preceded by: New title
- Succeeded by: TBA

Political Commissar of the Space Systems Department of the Strategic Support Force of the People's Liberation Army
- In office August 2021 – April 2024
- Preceded by: Jiang Ping

Personal details
- Born: November 1963 (age 62) Wen'an County, Hebei, China
- Party: Chinese Communist Party
- Education: Hebei University of Technology

Military service
- Allegiance: People's Republic of China
- Branch/service: People's Liberation Army Air Force
- Years of service: ?–present
- Rank: General

Chinese name
- Simplified Chinese: 陈辉
- Traditional Chinese: 陳輝
Transcriptions
Standard Mandarin
- Hanyu Pinyin: Chén Huī

Chen Hui (Chinese: 陈辉; born November 1963) is a general in the People's Liberation Army of China, currently serving as political commissar of the People's Liberation Army Ground Force.

== Biography ==
Chen was born in Wen'an County, Hebei, in November 1963, and graduated from Hebei University of Technology.

Chen was once political commissar of the 43rd Airborne Division of the People's Liberation Army Air Force Airborne Corps. He became deputy political commissar of the People's Liberation Army Air Force Command College in March 2010, and served until January 2016, when he was appointed secretary of the Discipline Inspection Commission of the Southern Theater Command Air Force. He was secretary of the Discipline Inspection Commission of the People's Liberation Army Air Force in September 2020, in addition to serving as director of the People's Liberation Army Air Force Supervisory Commission. He was political commissar of the Space Systems Department of the Strategic Support Force of the People's Liberation Army in August 2021 and subsequently political commissar of the People's Liberation Army Aerospace Force in April 2024. In December 2024, he was commissioned as political commissar of the People's Liberation Army Ground Force.

He was promoted to the rank of major general (shaojiang) in July 2011, lieutenant general (zhongjiang) in September 2020, and general (shangjiang) in December 2024.

Military offices
Preceded by Wang Chengnan	Secretary of the Discipline Inspection Commission of the People's Liberation Army Air Force; 2020–2021	Succeeded by Yu Yonghong
Preceded by Jiang Ping	Political Commissar of the Space Systems Department of the Strategic Support Force of the People's Liberation Army; 2021–2024	Succeeded by Position revoked
New title	Political Commissar of the People's Liberation Army Aerospace Force; 2024	Succeeded by TBA
Preceded by Qin Shutong	Political Commissar of the People's Liberation Army Ground Force; 2024–present	Incumbent
