= Aral, Xinjiang =

County-level city in Xinjiang, China

Aral 阿拉尔市 (Chinese) ئارال شەھىرى (Uyghur) Alar
- County-level & sub-prefectural city
- Interactive map of Aral
- Location of the seat within Xinjiang Aral (Xinjiang) Aral (China)
- Coordinates (Aral municipal government): 40°32′53″N 81°16′52″E
- Country: China
- Autonomous region: Xinjiang
- Municipal seat: Jinyinchuan Road Subdistrict

Government
  - CCP Secretary: Ding Yiqiang (Political Commissar of the 1st Division)
  - Mayor: Xiao Yong (Commander of the 1st Division)

Area
  - Total: 5,258.739 km^{2} (2,030.410 sq mi)

Population (2020)
  - Total: 328,241
  - Density: 62.4182/km^{2} (161.662/sq mi)
- Time zone: UTC+8 (China Standard (Note: Locals in Xinjiang frequently observe UTC+6 (Xinjiang Time), 2 hours behind Beijing.))
- Website: www.ale.gov.cn

Aral, Xinjiang

Chinese name
- Simplified Chinese: 阿拉尔
- Traditional Chinese: 阿拉爾
Transcriptions
Standard Mandarin
- Hanyu Pinyin: Ālā'ěr

Uyghur name
- Uyghur: ئارال
Transcriptions
- Latin Yëziqi: Aral
- Yengi Yeziⱪ: Aral
- SASM/GNC: Aral
- Siril Yëziqi: Арал

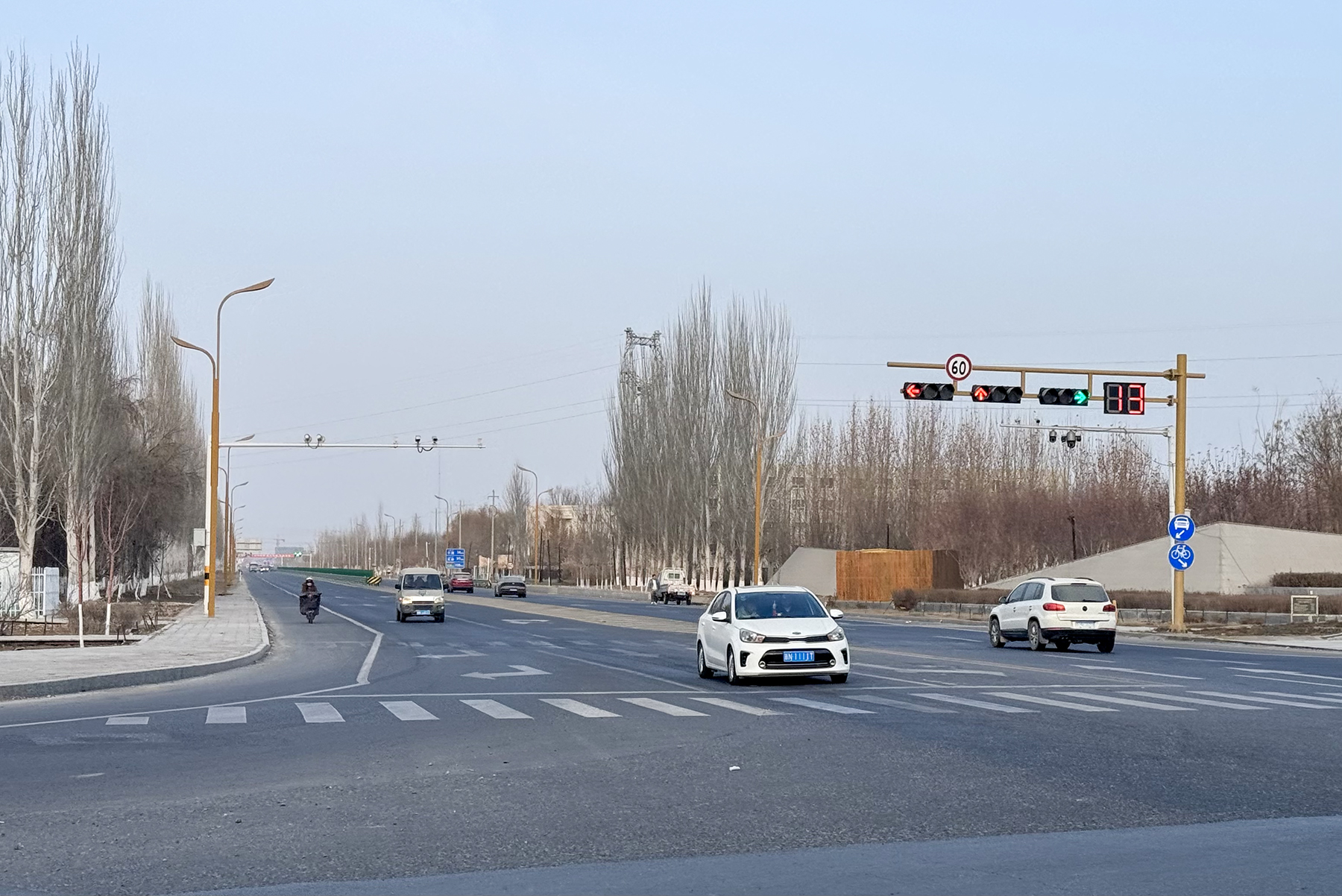
G217 Highway in Aral

Aral (Uyghur: ئارال), also known as Alar (Chinese: 阿拉尔), is a sub-prefecture-level city surrounded by Aksu Prefecture in Xinjiang Uyghur Autonomous Region, China. Aral means "island" in Uyghur.

Aral is the headquarter of the 1st Division of Xinjiang Production and Construction Corps and currently administered by the 1st Division. Aral implemented the "division and city integration" (师市合一, shī shì héyī) management system and shares the same leader group with the 1st Division.

== History ==
According to Radio Free Asia, a United States government-funded news service, Aral was created in the 1950s by the Xinjiang Production and Construction Corps to facilitate Han Chinese immigration to the region.

Aral became a city in 2002 and its population increased to 166,205 in 2010.

On January 23, 2013, 474.208 km^{2} (183.093 mi^{2}) of territory was transferred from Awat County (Awati) to Aral city and 802.733 km^{2} (309.937 mi^{2}) of territory was transferred from Aksu city (Akesu) to Aral city.

== Administrative divisions ==
Aral contains three subdistricts, 15 towns, a township, and two township-equivalent regions:

| Name | Simplified Chinese | Hanyu Pinyin | Uyghur (UEY) | Uyghur Latin (ULY) | Administrative division code | Notes |
|---|---|---|---|---|---|---|
Subdistricts
| Jinyinchuan Road Subdistrict | 金银川路街道 | Jīnyínchuānlù Jiēdào | جىنيىنچۇەن يولى كوچا باشقارمىسى | Jinyinchuen yoli kocha bashqarmisi | 659002001 | |
| Xingfu Road Subdistrict | 幸福路街道 | Xìngfúlù Jiēdào | بەخت يولى كوچا باشقارمىسى | Bext yoli kocha bashqarmisi | 659002002 | |
| Qingsong Road Subdistrict | 青松路街道 | Qīngsōnglù Jiēdào | چىڭسۇڭ يولى كوچا باشقارمىسى | Chingsung yoli kocha bashqarmisi | 659002003 | |
Towns
| Jinyinchuan Town (1st Regiment Farm)* | 金银川镇 (一团) | Jīnyínchuān Zhèn | جىنيىنچۇەن بازىرى | Jinyinchuen baziri | 659002100 | de facto administered by the 7th Division since May 2017 |
| Xinjingzi Town (2nd Regiment Farm)* | 新井子镇 (二团) | Xīnjǐngzǐ Zhèn | | | 659002101 | |
| Ganquan Town (3rd Regiment Farm)* | 甘泉镇 (三团) | Gānquán Zhèn | | | 659002102 | |
| Yongning Town (4th Regiment Farm)* | 永宁镇 (四团) | Yǒngníng Zhèn | يۇڭنىڭ بازىرى | Yungning baziri | 659002103 | |
| Shahe Town (5th Regiment Farm)* | 沙河镇 (五团) | Yǒngníng Zhèn | | | 659002104 | de facto administered by the 11th Division (Construction Engineer Division) since May 2017 |
| Shuangcheng Town (6th Regiment Farm)* | 双城镇 (六团) | Shuāngchéng Zhèn | | | 659002105 | |
| Huaqiao Town (11th Regiment Farm)* | 花桥镇 (十一团) | Huāqiáo Zhèn | | | 659002106 | |
| Xingfu Town (13th Regiment Farm)* | 幸福镇 (十三团) | Xìngfú Zhèn | | | 659002107 | |
| Jinyang Town (14th Regiment Farm)* | 金杨镇 (十四团) | Jīnyáng Zhèn | | | 659002108 | |
| Matan Town (7th Regiment Farm)* | 玛滩镇 (七团) | Mǎtān Zhèn | | | 659002109 | |
| Tamen Town (8th Regiment Farm)* | 塔门镇 (八团) | Tǎmén Zhèn | | | 659002110 | |
| Lihua Town (9th Regiment Farm)* | 梨花镇 (九团) | Líhuā Zhèn | | | 659002111 | |
| Chang'an Town (10th Regiment Farm)* | 昌安镇 (十团) | Chāng'ān Zhèn | | | 659002112 | |
| Tanan Town (12th Regiment Farm)* | 塔南镇 (十二团) | Tǎnán Zhèn | | | 659002113 | |
| Xinkailing Town (16th Regiment Farm)* | 新开岭镇 (十六团) | Xīnkāilǐng Zhèn | | | 659002114 | |
Township
| Tokay Township | 托喀依乡 | Tuōkāyī Xiāng | توقاي يېزىسى | Toqay yëzisi | 659002200 | |
Township-equivalent regions
| Aral Industrial Park | 工业园区 | Gōngyè Yuánqū | | | 659002402 | |
| Aral Western Industrial Park | 西工业园区 | Xī Gōngyè Yuánqū | | | 659002518 | |
* One institution with two names. See also Tuntian#People's Republic of China.

== Geography ==
The city has an administrative area of 5,258.739 km^{2} (2,030.410 sq mi). It is bordered by mountainous regions to the north and northwest and the Taklamakan Desert to the east and south.

== Demographics ==
As of 2015, 167,697 (93.6%) of the 179,214 residents of the county were Han Chinese, 6,036 (3.4%) were Uyghur and 5,481 were from other ethnic groups.

== Climate ==
Climate data for Aral, elevation 1,012 m (3,320 ft), (1991–2020 normals, extremes 1981–present)
| Month | Jan | Feb | Mar | Apr | May | Jun | Jul | Aug | Sep | Oct | Nov | Dec | Year |
|---|---|---|---|---|---|---|---|---|---|---|---|---|---|
| Record high °C (°F) | 9.4 (48.9) | 15.8 (60.4) | 28.1 (82.6) | 35.7 (96.3) | 37.2 (99.0) | 38.5 (101.3) | 40.9 (105.6) | 40.6 (105.1) | 37.8 (100.0) | 30.0 (86.0) | 22.2 (72.0) | 10.6 (51.1) | 40.9 (105.6) |
| Mean daily maximum °C (°F) | −0.1 (31.8) | 6.5 (43.7) | 15.4 (59.7) | 24.0 (75.2) | 28.7 (83.7) | 31.6 (88.9) | 32.6 (90.7) | 31.4 (88.5) | 27.4 (81.3) | 20.8 (69.4) | 10.8 (51.4) | 1.7 (35.1) | 19.2 (66.6) |
| Daily mean °C (°F) | −8.1 (17.4) | −1.5 (29.3) | 7.7 (45.9) | 16.0 (60.8) | 20.8 (69.4) | 23.8 (74.8) | 24.7 (76.5) | 23.5 (74.3) | 18.7 (65.7) | 10.3 (50.5) | 1.5 (34.7) | −5.7 (21.7) | 11.0 (51.8) |
| Mean daily minimum °C (°F) | −14.6 (5.7) | −8.7 (16.3) | 0.4 (32.7) | 8.1 (46.6) | 13.0 (55.4) | 16.2 (61.2) | 17.6 (63.7) | 16.6 (61.9) | 11.3 (52.3) | 2.6 (36.7) | −4.8 (23.4) | −11.0 (12.2) | 3.9 (39.0) |
| Record low °C (°F) | −25.4 (−13.7) | −24.9 (−12.8) | −12.3 (9.9) | −3.3 (26.1) | 3.3 (37.9) | 7.2 (45.0) | 9.3 (48.7) | 7.9 (46.2) | 2.9 (37.2) | −6.0 (21.2) | −14.1 (6.6) | −23.4 (−10.1) | −25.4 (−13.7) |
| Average precipitation mm (inches) | 1.0 (0.04) | 1.1 (0.04) | 0.9 (0.04) | 0.9 (0.04) | 6.6 (0.26) | 11.3 (0.44) | 11.9 (0.47) | 11.7 (0.46) | 6.8 (0.27) | 1.8 (0.07) | 0.9 (0.04) | 1.2 (0.05) | 56.1 (2.22) |
| Average precipitation days (≥ 0.1 mm) | 1.8 | 0.7 | 0.5 | 0.9 | 2.9 | 5.2 | 6.1 | 5.0 | 2.5 | 0.7 | 0.6 | 1.3 | 28.2 |
| Average snowy days | 3.7 | 1.1 | 0.2 | 0 | 0 | 0 | 0 | 0 | 0 | 0 | 0.4 | 3.7 | 9.1 |
| Average relative humidity (%) | 67 | 56 | 45 | 37 | 40 | 49 | 56 | 59 | 61 | 62 | 65 | 71 | 56 |
| Mean monthly sunshine hours | 193.2 | 192.9 | 213.3 | 230.7 | 269.3 | 283.9 | 291.4 | 272.2 | 256.0 | 260.8 | 212.1 | 180.0 | 2,855.8 |
| Percentage possible sunshine | 64 | 63 | 57 | 57 | 60 | 63 | 65 | 65 | 70 | 78 | 73 | 63 | 65 |
Source: China Meteorological Administration all-time extreme temperature all-time September high

== Education ==
Tarim University is located in Aral.

== Transportation ==
Ala'er Talimu Airport is a regional airport located at 12 km south from Aral city.

Aral Railway Station is located at southwest suburban of the city.

== See also ==
- Xinjiang Production and Construction Corps
