= Ürümqi County =

Ürümqi County: 乌鲁木齐县 (Chinese); ئۈرۈمچى ناھىيىسى (Uyghur)
- County
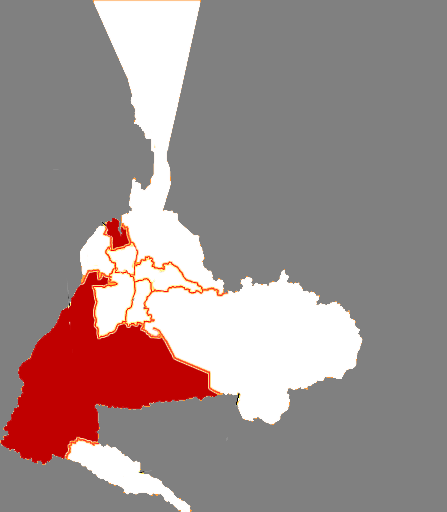
- Ürümqi County in Ürümqi City

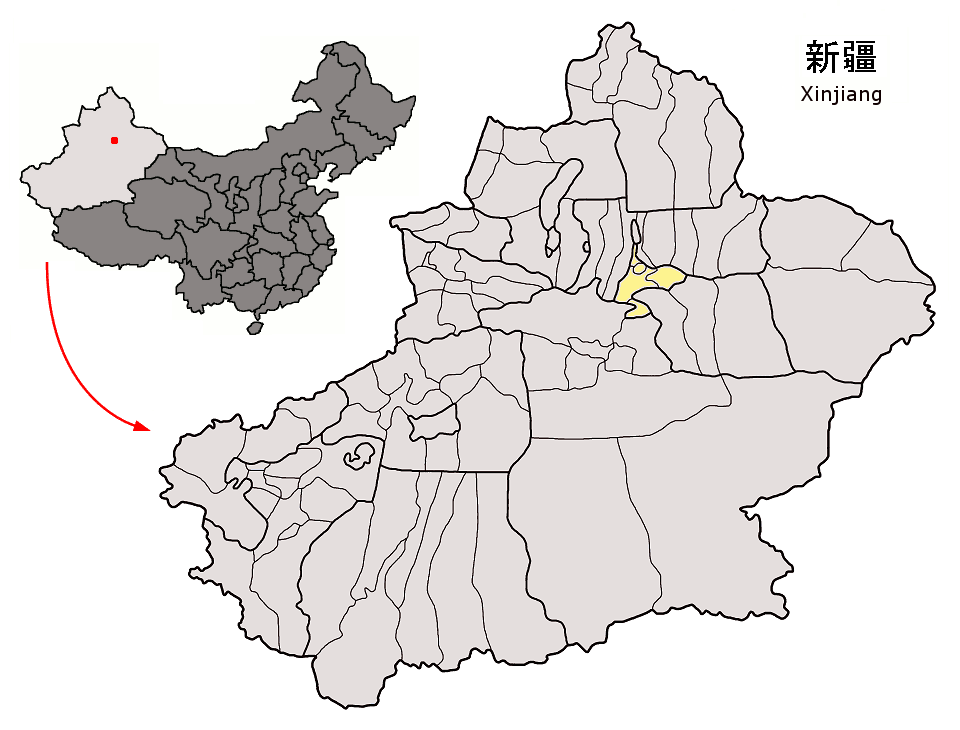
- Ürümqi City in Xinjiang

- Location of the seat in Xinjiang Ürümqi County (Xinjiang) Ürümqi County (China)
- Coordinates: 43°28′19″N 87°24′36″E
- Country: China
- Province: Xinjiang
- Prefecture-level city: Ürümqi
- County seat: Banfanggou

Area
  - Total: 4,242 km^{2} (1,638 sq mi)

Population (2020)
  - Total: 73,590
  - Density: 17.35/km^{2} (44.93/sq mi)
- Time zone: UTC+8 (China Standard (Note: Locals in Xinjiang frequently observe UTC+6 (Xinjiang Time), 2 hours behind Beijing.))
- Website: www.wlmqx.gov.cn

Ürümqi County

Chinese name
- Simplified Chinese: 乌鲁木齐县
- Traditional Chinese: 烏魯木齊縣
- Postal: Urumtsi
Transcriptions
Standard Mandarin
- Hanyu Pinyin: Wūlǔmùqí Xiàn
- Wade–Giles: Wu^{1}-lu^{3}-mu^{4}-ch'i^{2}-hsien^{4}

Alternative Chinese name
- Simplified Chinese: 迪化县
- Traditional Chinese: 迪化縣
Transcriptions
Standard Mandarin
- Hanyu Pinyin: Díhuà Xiàn

Uyghur name
- Uyghur: ئۈرۈمچى ناھىيىسى
Transcriptions
- Latin Yëziqi: Ürümchi Nahiyisi
- Yengi Yeziⱪ: Ürümqi Naⱨiyisi
- Siril Yëziqi: Үрүмчи Наһийиси

Ürümqi County (Uyghur: ئۈرۈمچى ناھىيىسى) is a county of Xinjiang Uygur Autonomous Region, Northwest China, under the administration of the prefecture-level city of Ürümqi, the capital of Xinjiang. It contains an area of 4,601 km^{2} (1,776 sq mi) and according to the 2002 census has a population of 80,000.

According to Xingjiang geographic graduate school of Chinese Section College, the geographical midpoint of Asia is located within the county. Urumqi Glacier No.1, the glacier closest to an urban area in the world is also in the county.

== Administrative divisions ==
Ürümqi County contains 3 towns and 3 townships:

Name	Simplified Chinese	Hanyu Pinyin	Uyghur (UEY)	Uyghur Latin (ULY)	Administrative division code
Towns
Shuixigou Town	水西沟镇	Shuǐxīgōu Zhèn	شۇيشىگۇ بازىرى	Shuyshigu baziri	650121100
Banfanggou Town	板房沟镇	Bǎnfánggōu Zhèn	بەنفاڭگۇ بازىرى	Benfanggu baziri	650121102
Yongfeng Town	永丰镇	Yǒngfēng Zhèn	يۇڭفېڭ بازىرى	Yungfëng baziri	650121103
Townships
Sardawan Township	萨尔达坂乡	Sà'ěrdábǎn Xiāng	سارداۋان يېزىسى	Sardawan yëzisi	650121207
Gangou Township	甘沟乡	Gāngōu Xiāng	گەنگۇ يېزىسى	Gengu yëzisi	650121208
Toli Township	托里乡	Tuōlǐ Xiāng	تولى يېزىسى	Toli yëzisi	650121213

== Climate ==
Climate data for Ürümqi County (Baiyanggou Natural Scenic Area), elevation 1,930 m (6,330 ft), (1991–2020 normals)
Month	Jan	Feb	Mar	Apr	May	Jun	Jul	Aug	Sep	Oct	Nov	Dec	Year
Mean daily maximum °C (°F)	−4.1 (24.6)	−1.8 (28.8)	4.1 (39.4)	11.0 (51.8)	15.4 (59.7)	19.7 (67.5)	21.7 (71.1)	21.1 (70.0)	16.5 (61.7)	9.9 (49.8)	2.6 (36.7)	−2.5 (27.5)	9.5 (49.1)
Daily mean °C (°F)	−10.3 (13.5)	−8.0 (17.6)	−2.2 (28.0)	4.7 (40.5)	9.2 (48.6)	14.0 (57.2)	15.9 (60.6)	14.8 (58.6)	9.8 (49.6)	3.3 (37.9)	−3.5 (25.7)	−8.3 (17.1)	3.3 (37.9)
Mean daily minimum °C (°F)	−14.3 (6.3)	−12.3 (9.9)	−6.7 (19.9)	0.0 (32.0)	4.3 (39.7)	9.1 (48.4)	11.0 (51.8)	10.0 (50.0)	5.2 (41.4)	−0.8 (30.6)	−7.4 (18.7)	−12.3 (9.9)	−1.2 (29.9)
Average precipitation mm (inches)	6.4 (0.25)	11.8 (0.46)	20.7 (0.81)	51.9 (2.04)	76.8 (3.02)	85.5 (3.37)	83.8 (3.30)	65.8 (2.59)	31.7 (1.25)	23.4 (0.92)	19.8 (0.78)	10.7 (0.42)	488.3 (19.21)
Average precipitation days (≥ 0.1 mm)	5.4	6.3	8.0	11.4	14.3	16.1	17.7	13.3	8.7	7.0	8.0	6.1	122.3
Average snowy days	6.6	7.5	8.8	7.1	2.9	0.1	0	0	1.3	5.6	8.4	7.3	55.6
Average relative humidity (%)	58	60	60	59	58	59	59	58	57	59	61	58	59
Mean monthly sunshine hours	175.0	180.8	228.2	219.3	226.3	216.5	232.1	228.3	223.1	208.2	160.6	157.4	2,455.8
Percentage possible sunshine	60	60	61	54	49	47	50	54	61	62	56	57	56
Source: China Meteorological Administration

Climate data for Tianshan Daxigou Station (Urumqi Glacier No.1), elevation 3,539 m (11,611 ft), (1991–2020 normals, extremes 1981–2010)
Month	Jan	Feb	Mar	Apr	May	Jun	Jul	Aug	Sep	Oct	Nov	Dec	Year
Record high °C (°F)	0.4 (32.7)	2.2 (36.0)	8.5 (47.3)	13.2 (55.8)	15.5 (59.9)	15.6 (60.1)	19.2 (66.6)	18.5 (65.3)	16.4 (61.5)	11.2 (52.2)	6.5 (43.7)	3.2 (37.8)	19.2 (66.6)
Mean daily maximum °C (°F)	−10.8 (12.6)	−8.6 (16.5)	−4.1 (24.6)	1.3 (34.3)	5.0 (41.0)	8.7 (47.7)	10.8 (51.4)	10.5 (50.9)	6.9 (44.4)	0.9 (33.6)	−4.8 (23.4)	−8.9 (16.0)	0.6 (33.0)
Daily mean °C (°F)	−15.3 (4.5)	−13.5 (7.7)	−9.5 (14.9)	−4.3 (24.3)	−0.2 (31.6)	3.7 (38.7)	5.9 (42.6)	5.3 (41.5)	1.5 (34.7)	−4.1 (24.6)	−9.5 (14.9)	−13.4 (7.9)	−4.4 (24.0)
Mean daily minimum °C (°F)	−19.1 (−2.4)	−17.6 (0.3)	−13.8 (7.2)	−8.4 (16.9)	−4.2 (24.4)	0.0 (32.0)	2.2 (36.0)	1.6 (34.9)	−2.2 (28.0)	−7.8 (18.0)	−13.2 (8.2)	−17.2 (1.0)	−8.3 (17.0)
Record low °C (°F)	−39.7 (−39.5)	−34.7 (−30.5)	−31.2 (−24.2)	−24.6 (−12.3)	−18.8 (−1.8)	−12.9 (8.8)	−6.9 (19.6)	−14.4 (6.1)	−17.5 (0.5)	−21.8 (−7.2)	−36.4 (−33.5)	−35.5 (−31.9)	−39.7 (−39.5)
Average precipitation mm (inches)	2.5 (0.10)	4.5 (0.18)	11.8 (0.46)	34.3 (1.35)	59.6 (2.35)	108.3 (4.26)	133.8 (5.27)	98.7 (3.89)	40.8 (1.61)	14.1 (0.56)	5.8 (0.23)	2.9 (0.11)	517.1 (20.37)
Average precipitation days (≥ 0.1 mm)	3.6	5.5	9.0	14.4	18.4	21.6	23.1	19.4	13.7	8.5	4.7	3.6	145.5
Average snowy days	5.0	6.5	9.9	14.9	19.1	15.2	9.8	9.3	13.4	10.0	5.6	4.4	123.1
Average relative humidity (%)	48	50	52	59	63	70	71	67	61	54	50	48	58
Mean monthly sunshine hours	144.1	172.5	231.0	250.5	250.8	215.9	212.7	232.7	225.2	208.4	153.4	134.2	2,431.4
Percentage possible sunshine	49	57	62	62	55	47	46	55	61	62	54	48	55
Source: China Meteorological Administration
