= 4th Motorized Infantry Division =

4th Division (1949–53) 4th Infantry Division (1953–60) 4th Army Division (1960–69) 4th Army Division (1969-85) 4th Motorized Infantry Division (1985-)
- Active: 1949.2 -
- Country: People's Republic of China
- Branch: People's Liberation Army Ground Force
- Type: Motorized infantry
- Size: Division
- Part of: Xinjiang Military District
- Garrison/HQ: Aksu, Xinjiang
- Engagements: Chinese Civil War Sino-Indian War Sino-Indian border dispute: 2020–2021 China–India skirmishes

The 4th Division (Chinese: 第4师) was created in February 1949 under the Regulation of the Redesignations of All Organizations and Units of the Army, issued by Central Military Commission on November 1, 1948, basing on the 4th Independent Brigade, 2nd Column of the PLA Northwest Field Army.

== History ==
=== Early years ===
The division's history can be traced to the 4th Independent Brigade of Lvliang Military District, formed in November 1945.

The division is part of 2nd Corps. Under the flag of 4th division it took part in the Chinese Civil War. In March 1953 it renamed as the 4th Infantry Division (Chinese: 步兵第4师) of the National Defense Force and was transferred to Xinjiang Military Region's control. The division absorbed units from 5th and 6th Infantry Division as follows:

- 10th Infantry Regiment was formed from former 10th, 12th and Independent Regiment of 4th Division;
- 11th Infantry Regiment was formed from former 14th, 15th and 3rd battalion/13th Regiment of 5th Division and Border Battalion of Training Regiment, 2nd Corps;
- 12th Infantry Regiment was formed from former 49th, 50th and 51st Regiment of 17th Division.

In the early 1950s 304th Artillery Regiment was activated.

=== Renaming and attachments ===
In 1960 the division was renamed as the 4th Army Division (Chinese: 陆军第4师).

In 1962 detachments from the division took part in the Sino-Indian War.

In December 1969 its 304th Artillery Regiment was renamed as Artillery Regiment, 4th Army Division.

In January 1979 the division became a Motorized Army Division. In the same month Tank Regiment, 4th Army Division was activated and attached to the division.

=== Next renaming and reorganisation ===
From 1985 the division was renamed as the 4th Motorized Infantry Division (Chinese: 摩托化步兵第4师) and became a Northern Motorized Infantry Division, Catalogue A unit and an antiaircraft artillery regiment was activated. By then the division was composed of:

- 10th Motorized Infantry Regiment;
- 11th Motorized Infantry Regiment;
- 12th Motorized Infantry Regiment;
- Tank Regiment;
- Artillery Regiment;
- Antiaircraft Artillery Regiment.

=== Recent status ===
In 1998 the 10th Motorized Infantry Regiment was disbanded and the Tank Regiment was renamed as the Armored Regiment.

Since then the division was composed of:

- 11th Motorized Infantry Regiment;
- 12th Motorized Infantry Regiment;
- Armored Regiment;
- Artillery Regiment;
- Antiaircraft Artillery Regiment.

The division is now stationing in Aksu, Xinjiang.
