= 11th Motorized Infantry Division =

11th Division (1949–52) 11th Infantry Division (1952–60) 11th Army Division (1960–85) 11th Motorized Infantry Division (1985–)
- Active: February 1949–present
- Country: People's Republic of China
- Branch: People's Liberation Army
- Type: Division
- Role: Motorized Infantry
- Part of: Xinjiang Military Region
- Garrison/HQ: Urumqi, Xinjiang
- Nickname: Red Army Division(Chinese: 红军师)
- Engagements: Chinese Civil War Sino-Indian War; Sino-Indian War of 1967; Sino-Vietnam War; Sino-Indian border dispute: 2020–2021 China–India skirmishes

The 11th Division (Chinese: 第11师) was created in February 1949 under the Regulation of the Redesignations of All Organizations and Units of the Army, issued by Central Military Commission on November 1, 1948, basing on the 3rd Security Brigade, 4th Column of the PLA Northwest Field Army. Its composition can be traced to 84th Division of 27th Corps, Military Division of Shaanxi-Gansu, 29th Corps, Independent Division of Shanganning, 2nd Regiment of Shanganning, 1st Independent Division of Northern Shaanxi and Headquarters, 4th Corps, all parts of Chinese Workers' and Peasants' Red Army.

The division was composed of 31st, 32nd, and 33rd Regiments. Under the command of 4th Corps, it took part in the Chinese Civil War. including the Battle of Yan'an and Lanzhou Campaign. After the foundation of the People's Republic of China, the division took part in the Campaign to Suppress Bandits in Northwestern China and the suppression of 1959 Tibetan uprising.

In June 1952 the division was renamed as 11th Infantry Division. 33rd Infantry Regiment was disbanded and absorbed into 31st and 32nd Regiments, while 30th Infantry Regiment, 10th Division was attached to the division as 30th Infantry Regiment, 11th Infantry Division. Artillery Training Regiment, 4th Corps was attached to the division as Artillery Regiment, 11th Infantry Division.

In April-June 1953, all regiments of the division were renamed as:

- 31st Infantry Regiment (former 30th);
- 32nd Infantry Regiment (former 31st);
- 33rd Infantry Regiment (former 32nd);
- 305th Artillery Regiment (former Artillery).

From October 1960 the division was renamed as 11th Army Division (Chinese: 陆军第11师). The division was then stationed in Shigatse, Tibet.

In October 1962 the division took part in Sino-Indian War. During the campaign, the division allegedly neutralized 2,000 Indian soldiers, captured 9 tanks and over 300 trucks. From 1962 the division maintained as a category A unit.

In 1965, in order to distract the Indian Army and support Pakistan in the Indo-Pakistani War of 1965, the division conducted two camouflage maneuvers alongside the border.

In 1967 the division took part in Nathu La and Cho La clashes.

In June 1969, 305th Artillery Regiment was renamed as Artillery Regiment, 11th Army Division.

From April 1979, the division moved to Urumqi, Xinjiang.

From 1983 the division was reduced to a category B unit.

In 1985 the division was renamed as 11th Motorized Infantry Division (Chinese: 摩托化步兵第11师), as a northern motorized infantry division, category A unit. By then the division was composed of:

- 31st Infantry Regiment;
- 32nd Infantry Regiment;
- 33rd Infantry Regiment;
- Tank Regiment (former Independent Tank Regiment of Urumqi Military Region);
- Artillery Regiment;
- Anti-Aircraft Artillery Regiment (former 662nd Anti-Aircraft Artillery Regiment of 73rd Artillery Division).

From September 1985 to September 1986, Reconnaissance Company, 11th Infantry Division participated in the Sino-Vietnamese War subordinated to the 8th Reconnaissance Group, Lanzhou Military Region. During its deployment, the company was engaged in 27 engagement and recon missions, killed 50, and captured 2 confronting PAVN soldiers. The company suffered 0 killed, 3 heavily wounded, and 2 lightly wounded.

In 1988, the 11th Motorized Infantry Division was decorated as a Red Army Division, with all three infantry regiments as Red Army Regiments.

In 1998, 33rd Infantry Regiment was disbanded. Tank Regiment, 11th Motorized Infantry Division was renamed as Armored Regiment, 11th Motorized Infantry Division. Since then the division was composed of:

- 31st Infantry Regiment;
- 32nd Infantry Regiment;
- Armored Regiment;
- Artillery Regiment;
- Anti-Aircraft Regiment.

The division is now a maneuver unit of Xinjiang Military Region and one of few divisions left in the Ground Force of People's Liberation Army.
