= 6th Fighter Division =

PRC air force division

The 6th Fighter Division is an air division of the People's Liberation Army Air Force. It is part of the air force component of the Western Theater Command, and formerly part of the Lanzhou Military Region Air Force.

It was formed in November 1950 at Anshan. It originally consisted of the 16th, 17th, and 18th Regiments.

In Korea it fought under the leadership of commander Bei Sha and Commissar Zhang Zhiyong, deploying the 16th and 18th Regiments flying MiG-9s and MiG-15s It entered combat in November 1951 and returned to China in March 1952.

The division consists of 1 fighter regiment with J-11, and two fighter regiments with Chengdu J-7s (inc 1 with E).
