= Xinjiang Military District =

Military district of China

- 中国人民解放军新疆军区
- Map of Xinjiang Military District in 2024
- Founded: 1 February 2016; 10 years ago
- Country: China
- Allegiance: Chinese Communist Party
- Type: Military District of the PLA
- Role: Command and control
- Part of: People's Liberation Army
- Headquarters: Xinjiang, Urumqi

Commanders
- Commander: Lieutenant General Liu Lin
- Political Commisar: Lieutenant General Yang Cheng
- Chief of Staff: Major General Liu Haifu

Xinjiang Military District (新疆军区) is a special military area of the PLA at the Theater Deputy-grade (副战区级). It is one of three districts (Tibet and Beijing being the other two) that are directly under the Joint Staff Department of the Central Military Commission rather than under their Theater Command (in this case, the Western Theater Command).

The district includes all of Xinjiang, plus the Ngari district of Tibet. It has also direct military jurisdiction over the Xinjiang Production and Construction Corps (XPCC).

== History ==
The Xinjiang Military District of the Chinese People's Liberation Army (PLA) was founded in December 1949 as a subordinate military area to the Northwest Military Region and was elevated to a major military region in May 1955, operating directly under the Central Military Commission's authority.

In 1979, it was rebranded as the Urumqi Military Region; in June 1985, it amalgamated with the Lanzhou Military Region and concurrently established the Xinjiang Military Region, which operated at the corps level under the auspices of the Lanzhou Military Region; in April 1992, it was elevated to full military status following the dissolution of the corps-level structure; in October 1998, it was promoted to the status of vice-great-military region.

The current Xinjiang Military District was created in 2016 from the former Lanzhou Military Region as part of the 2015 reforms. While it is officially under the jurisdiction of the Western Theater.

The XMD covers the contested area of Aksai Chin, and it is a sensitive hotspot in China's borders. In 2020, it was the XMD that got involved in skirmishes and a protracted stand-off with India.

Recently (as of 2024) there have been efforts to create a "six-in-one" border defense system, in which the PLA, the police, the militia, party officials, government officials, and civilians would cooperate in patrolling the enormously long and harsh border of both the Xinjiang and Tibet MDs, with an emphasis on local nomadic tribes that know the terrain and are highly mobile by definition.

== Territorial Command Divisions ==
The XMD is divided into the northern district and the southern Xinjiang subdistrict (Nanjiang), which is a Corps-graded (正军级) unit responsible for the volatile Sino-Indian border.

These two main sub-areas are then divided into the following command sectors, generally comprising a prefecture:

- Directly under the Xinjiang Military District:
  - Urumqi Garrison Area (乌鲁木齐警备区)
  - Karamay Military Sector (克拉玛依军分区)
  - Shihezi Military Sector (石河子军分区)
  - Turpan Military Sector (吐鲁番军分区)
  - Hami Military Sector (哈密军分区)
  - Changji Military Sector (昌吉军分区)
  - Ili Military Sector (伊犁军分区)
  - Tacheng Military Sector (塔城军分区)
  - Altay Military Sector (阿勒泰军分区)
  - Bortala Military Sector (博尔塔拉军分区)
- Southern Xinjiang Military Region (Corps grade) – 南疆军区
  - Bayingolin Military Sector (巴音郭楞军分区)
  - Aksu Military Sector (阿克苏军分区)
  - Kashgar Military Sector (喀什军分区)
  - Kizilsu Military Sector (克孜勒苏军分区)
  - Hotan Military Sector (和田军分区)
  - Ngari Military Sector (阿里军分区)
- XPCC Military Department (Corps Deputy grade) 新疆生产建设兵团军事部

== Current Military Units ==
As of 2022, the People's Liberation Army Ground Force units garrisoning the District are as follows (including their main garrison location). Xinjiang is one of the few military regions in which full divisions are still retained as an organizational level post the 2015 reforms (which reduced most divisions into combined arms brigades). Due to the very long border it patrols, there are also fifteen Border Defense regiments assigned as well as the main maneuver force.

=== Maneuver Force ===
- 4th Combined Arms Division 合成第四师 (Kucha City, Aksu Prefecture)
- 6th Combined Arms Division合成第六师 (Kashgar)
- 8th Combined Arms Division 合成第八师 (Wusu, Ili Kazakh Autonomous Prefecture)
- 11th Combined Arms Division 合成第十一师 (Urumqi)
- 84th Special Forces Brigade "Kunlun Sharp Blades" (特战第八十四 "昆仑利刃") (Kashgar)
- 84th Army Aviation Brigade (陆航第八十四旅) (Changji, Changji Aweitan Airport (昌吉阿苇滩机场))
- 84th Artillery Brigade (炮兵第八十四旅) (Urumqi)
- 84th Air Defense Brigade (防空第八十四旅) (Urumqi)
- 6th Intelligence and Surveillance Brigade "Golden Falcons" (侦察情报第六旅 “金猎隼”) (Urumqi)
- 6th Information Support Brigade (信息保障第六旅) (Urumqi)
- 6th Electronic Countermeasures Brigade (电子对抗第六旅) (Urumqi)
- 4th Motorized Transport Brigade (汽车运输第四旅)
- 3rd Motorized Transport Regiment (汽车运输第三团)
- 1st Communications Regiment (通信第一团) (Urumqi)
- 2nd Communications Regiment (通信第二团) (Urumqi)
- 2nd Chemical Defense Regiment (防化第二团) (Urumqi)
- 9th Combat Engineers Regiment (工兵第九团) (Urumqi)
- Construction Engineering Regiment ('某'工兵团) (Rutog County, Ngari Prefecture)

=== Border Defense Units ===
- 361st Border Defense Regiment (边防第三六一团) (Tsamda County, Ngari Prefecture)
- 362nd Border Defense Regiment (边防第三六二团) (Rutog County, Ngari Prefecture): 362nd and 363rd regiments were the units originally engaged in the 2020 skirmishes.
- 363rd Border Defense Regiment (边防第三六三团) (Shahidulla, Pishan County, Hotan Prefecture); In Sanshili Barracks(三十里营房) and Shenxianwan border outpost
- 364th Border Defense Regiment (边防第三六四团)（Taxkorgan Tajik Autonomous County and Akto County, Kashgar）
- 365th Border Defense Regiment (边防第三六五团) (Ulugqat County, Kizilsu Kyrgyz Autonomous Prefecture
- 366th Border Defense Regiment (边防第三六六团)（Uchturpan CountyAksu Prefecture)
- 367th Border Defense Regiment (边防第三六七团) (Zhaosu County, Ili Kazakh Autonomous Prefecture)
- 368th Border Defense Regiment (边防第三六八团) (Huiyuan Town, Huocheng County, Ili Kazakh Autonomous Prefecture)
- 369th Border Defense Regiment (边防第三六九团)（Bole City, Bortala Mongol Autonomous Prefecture
- 370th Border Defense Regiment (边防第三七〇团) (Toli County, Tacheng Prefecture)
- 371st Border Defense Regiment (边防第三七一团)（Emin County, Tacheng Prefecture)
- 372nd Border Defense Regiment (边防第三七二团) (Fuyun County, Altay Prefecture)
- 373rd Border Defense Regiment (边防第三七三团) (Habahe County, Altay Prefecture)
- 374th Border Defense Regiment (边防第三七四团) (Qitai County, Changji Hui Autonomous Prefecture)
- 375th Border Defense Regiment (边防第三七五团) (Kumul City, Barkol Kazakh Autonomous County)

The Border Defense regiments cover some of the most challenging terrain in the world, and it is occasionally reported that some units still use horses for patrolling.
