= 6th Mechanized Infantry Division =

6th Army Division (1966–85) 6th Infantry Division (1985–90) 6th Motorized Infantry Division (1990–2003) 6th Mechanized Infantry Division (2003–)
- Active: 1966.11 -
- Country: People's Republic of China
- Branch: People's Liberation Army Ground Force
- Type: Mechanized Infantry
- Size: Division
- Part of: Xinjiang Military District
- Garrison/HQ: Kashgar, Xinjiang
- Engagements: Sino-Indian border dispute: 2020–2021 China–India skirmishes

The 6th Army Division (Chinese: 陆军第6师) was activated in November 1966 from 2nd and 4th Infantry Regiments of Xinjiang Military Region, Ali Cavalry Detachment and Independent Anti-Aircraft Artillery Battalion of the Military Region.

The division was composed of:

- 16th Infantry Regiment;
- 17th Infantry Regiment;
- 18th Infantry Regiment;
- 311th Artillery Regiment (dropped designation number in June 1969).

In 1985, the division was reorganized as the 6th Infantry Division (Chinese: 步兵第6师), as a northern infantry division, catalogue B.

In March 1990, the division was reconfigured as a motorized infantry division of high altitude. All infantry regiments were reorganized as motorized infantry regiments of high altitude.

In November 1993, 18th Motorized Infantry Regiment was reconfigured as mechanized infantry regiment.

In March 1995, the division was reconfigured as a northern infantry division, catalogue B.

In 2003 the division was reorganized as the 6th Mechanized Infantry Division (Chinese: 机械化步兵第6师). The 16th Motorized Infantry Regiment was reorganized as the Armored Regiment, 6th Mechanized Infantry Division.

Since then the division was composed of:

- 17th Mechanized Infantry Regiment;
- 18th Mechanized Infantry Regiment;
- Armored Regiment;
- Artillery Regiment;
- Anti-Aircraft Regiment.

The division is now a maneuver formation of the Xinjiang Military District, as one of the few divisions left in the People's Liberation Army Ground Force after the 2017 PLA Military Reform.
