= 8th Motorized Infantry Division =

1st Cavalry Division (1949–69) 8th Army Division (1969–85) 8th Motorized Infantry Division (1985–)
- Active: 1949.3 -
- Country: China
- Allegiance: Chinese Communist Party
- Branch: People's Liberation Army Ground Force
- Type: Motorized infantry
- Size: Division
- Part of: Xinjiang Military District
- Garrison/HQ: Tacheng, Xinjiang
- Engagements: Chinese Civil War Sino-Indian War Sino-Indian border dispute: 2020–2021 China–India skirmishes

The 1st Cavalry Division (Chinese: 骑兵第1师) was a division of the People's Liberation Army. It was created in March 1949 under the Regulation of the Redesignations of All Organizations and Units of the Army, issued by Central Military Commission on November 1, 1948, basing on Cavalry Brigade of Jinsui Military District. Its history can be traced to Cavalry Brigade of Shanganning-Jinsui Coalition Army formed in 1942.

The division was a part of 8th Corps. The division took part in the Chinese Civil War, including the Campaign to Suppress Bandits in Northwestern China.

In June 1952, the division absorbed 3rd Cavalry Division and the Cavalry Regiment of Henan Military District.

In August 1962 the division moved to Yecheng, Xinjiang. From January 1963 the division was transferred to Xinjiang Military Region's control.

The division was then composed of:

- 1st Cavalry Regiment;
- 2nd Cavalry Regiment;
- 3rd Cavalry Regiment;
- Artillery Battalion.

In August 1964, the division was converted to a southern division, catalogue B:

- 1st and 2nd Cavalry Regiments were reorganized as infantry regiments, retaining their designations;
- 3rd Cavalry Regiment maintained as a cavalry unit;
- Artillery Battalion, 1st Cavalry Division was expanded to Artillery Regiment, 1st Cavalry Division.

In October 1969, the division was renamed as the 8th Army Division (Chinese: 陆军第8师), and all its regiments were redesignated as follow:

- 22nd Infantry Regiment (former 1st Cavalry);
- 23rd Infantry Regiment (former 2nd Cavalry);
- 24th Infantry Regiment (former 3rd Cavalry);
- Artillery Regiment.

In November 1985, the division was renamed as the 8th Motorized Infantry Division (Chinese: 摩托化步兵第8师), as a northern motorized infantry division, catalogue A. The division was then composed of:

- 22nd Motorized Infantry Regiment;
- 23rd Motorized Infantry Regiment;
- 24th Motorized Infantry Regiment;
- Artillery Regiment;
- Anti-Aircraft Artillery Regiment (former 663rd Anti-Aircraft Artillery Regiment of 73rd Artillery Division).

The division also administratively controlled the 12th Garrison Regiment of Lanzhou Military Region, which was later disbanded in October 1992.

From September 1985 to October 1986, Reconnaissance Company, 11th Army Division (Motorized Infantry Division) took part in the Battle of Laoshan as a part of 5th Reconnaissance Group. The company earned the honorific title of Heroic Reconnaissance Company awarded by the Chengdu Military Region.

In December 1989, Tank Regiment, 11th Motorized Infantry Division was activated. In 1998, the regiment was renamed as Armored Regiment, 11th Motorized Infantry Division.

In 2003 the 23rd Motorized Infantry Regiment was disbanded. Since then the division is composed of:

- 22nd Motorized Infantry Regiment;
- 24th Motorized Infantry Regiment;
- Armored Regiment;
- Artillery Regiment;
- Anti-Aircraft Regiment.

The division is now a maneuver unit of Xinjiang Military District as one of few divisions left in the People's Liberation Army Ground Force.
