= LCAC =

LCAC may refer to:

== Hovercraft ==
- A generic term for an air cushioned landing craft, taken from US Navy designation "Landing Craft, Air Cushion".
  - Landing Craft Air Cushion, a US Navy hull classification symbol for the Landing Craft Air Cushion-class hovercraft
  - LCAC(L), a light assault hovercraft used by the Royal Navy and Marines
  - Lebed-class LCAC, an air-cushioned landing craft used by the Soviet and later Russian Navy
  - Type 726 LCAC, an air-cushioned landing craft used by the People's Liberation Army Navy
  - Zubr-class LCAC, an air-cushioned landing craft used by the Russian, Hellenic, and People's Liberation Army Navies

== Other ==
- Leicester Coritanian Athletics Club
