= Jinsha II-class LCAC =

Medium sized LCAC

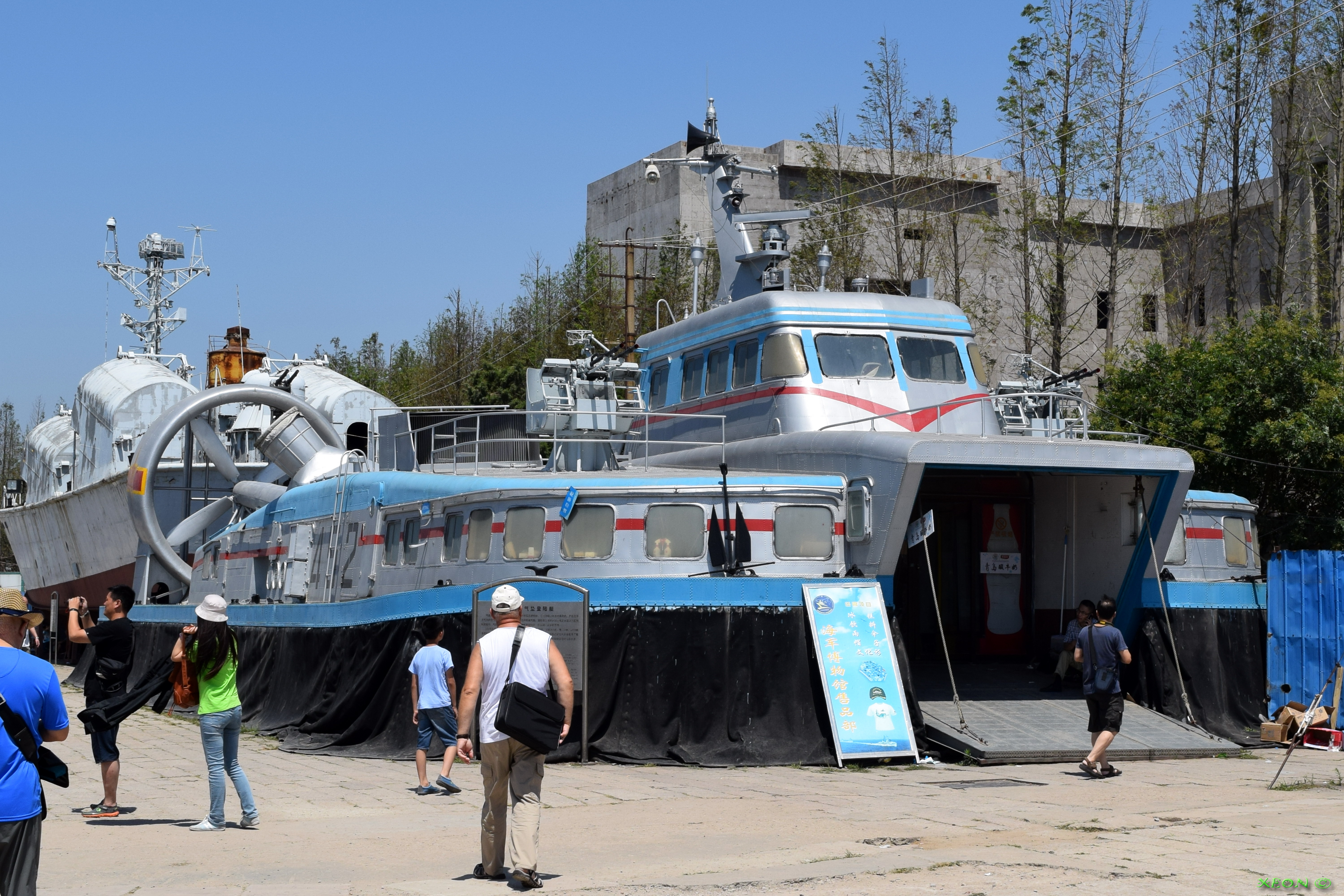
- Prototype 452 of Type 722 II LCAC in Chinese Navy Museum, Qingdao

Class overview
- Builders: Hudong Shipbuilding; Guijiang Shipyard; Jiangnan Shipyard
- Operators: People's Liberation Army Navy Surface Force
- Preceded by: Dagu-class LCACs
- In commission: 1989–present

General characteristics
- Type: Air-cushioned landing craft
- Displacement: 70 t (69 long tons) (full load)
- Length: 27 m (88 ft 7 in)
- Beam: 14 m (45 ft 11 in)
- Height: 9.6 m (31 ft 6 in)
- Propulsion: Turbine engines; 2 propulsion engines, 2 lift engines; 2 four-bladed variable-pitch propellers
- Speed: 55 knots (102 km/h; 63 mph)
- Range: 165 nmi (306 km; 190 mi)
- Armament: 2 × twin 14.5 mm machine guns

The Type 722 II LCAC with NATO reporting name Jinsha II-class LCAC (Chinese: 金沙; pinyin: Jīnshā; lit. 'golden sand') is a medium size air-cushioned landing craft (hovercraft) operated by the People's Liberation Army Navy of China. It is frequently but erroneously referred by many as Dagu class, its predecessor, due to misspelling and lack of information in the 1970s, when these projects first appeared. There are also other names for this class, mostly resulting from different transliterations.

== Type 716 LCAC ==
The origin of Type 722 II LCAC can be traced straight back in the late 1960s to the Type 716 LCAC, from which Type 722 II eventually developed from directly. In the late 1960s, People's Liberation Army General Logistics Department requested 708th Research Institute to design a prototype LCAC for logistic needs to supply coastal islands, but due to political turmoil in China, namely, the Cultural Revolution, construction took three years after the design was approved, and it was not until 1978 when the boat was finally completed by Hudong Shipbuilding (沪东造船厂) in Shanghai and entered service in the same year. The NATO reporting name Dagu A class was given to the Type 716 LCAC, which achieved speed over 100 km/h (62 mph) during trials in Dianshan Lake, before being sent to South China Sea for further evaluation. Ships of the Type 716 measured 17.94 metres (58 ft 10 in) long with a width of 8.3 m (27 ft 3 in) and a height of 4.55 m (14 ft 11 in). The vessels had a displacement of 18.6 t (18.3 long tons) and a capacity for a platoon of 32 troops or 2 t (2.0 long tons; 2.2 short tons) of cargo. The LCAC were powered by a single piston-driven aero-engine.

The Type 716's NATO reporting name Dagu A class was erroneously used to refer other Chinese LCACs, but analysis of the technical data revealed that this name is actually for Type 716 class (also Type 716 I class when the upgraded version appeared later), when more information became available from Chinese official sources years later.

== Type 716 II LCAC ==
Type 716 LCAC did not enter mass production after the prototype was built due to its fatal design flaw: the propulsion system was an aero engine driven by gasoline, which is prone to fire. The 708th Research Institute and Hudong Shipyard completed its upgrade in 1983, which replaced the original gasoline engine with a 12L413FC diesel engine. Other improvements included utilization of ducted propeller, and redesigned skirt and propulsion system. The improvement version designed was designated the Type 716 II, and given the NATO reporting name Dagu B class. Experience gained from this class was directly used on later Type 722 II LCAC.

== Type 722 LCAC ==
In 1975, after the design of Type 716 LCAC was approved, the Chinese navy asked the 708th Research Institute to design a medium-sized LCAC utilizing experienced gained from Type 716. Just as in the case of Type 716, the Type 722 LCAC suffered delay in construction after design was approved due to the same political turmoil in China, and it was not until 1979 when the first unit entered the service. The prototype was built with aluminum alloy with both the bow and stern door/ramp, and was able to carry up to 15 t (15 long tons; 17 short tons) of cargo or a company of soldiers. With a displacement of 65 t (64 long tons), the craft can reach speed of 90 km/h (56 mph) powered by four 1,100 kW (1,500 hp) aero-engines. The Type 722 received the NATO reporting name Jingsha I-class LCAC. The sole prototype (452) lacked a bow door for disembarkation, but this feature may have been added to an improved version before entering production.

However, deployment experienced revealed that the performance of Type 722 was not satisfactory. The primary design flaw was the same one shared by its direct predecessor, the Type 716, in that the four engines are gasoline drive, prone to fire. In addition, the engine was very noisy and had a high MTBF rate, and the aluminum alloy was not resistant to salt corrosion. This shortcoming lead to a massive improvement program that lasted a decade, resulting in Type 722 II LCAC.

== Type 722 II LCAC ==
To solve the problems of the Type 722 LCAC exposed during deployment, designers looked back to its predecessor Type 716 I/II LCAC for answers, but due to the difference between the two classes, new technologies were needed, including new type of magnesium–aluminum alloy used to replace the original aluminum alloy. The improvement effort required more resources, and 702nd Research Institute and Chinese navy joined the team to assist the 708th Research Institute.

The most significant improvement of the Type 722 II LCAC over the original Type 722 is in its propulsion system. In 1983, an indigenous Type 409 gas turbine engine based on the WJ-6 (WJ = Wo-Jiang 涡浆) turboprop aero-engine was successfully developed, and it was decided to adopt it for the Type 722 II. Because this was the very first time a gas turbine engine was adopted for LCAC, many tests were needed, which protracted the time. It was not until three years later in 1986 when all land-based tests for the Type 409 gas turbine engine were completed, and then installed on the boat in the following year. Finally, in 1989, the first Type 722 II was completed and entered the service in the same year. The Type 722 II received the NATO reporting name Jinsha II-class LCAC.

The displacement of the Type 722 II LCAC is slightly increased to 70 t (69 long tons) in comparison to the 65 tonnes of the original Type 722 LCAC, but the cargo capacity is also increased by the same amount to 20 t (20 long tons; 22 short tons) total, as opposed to the 15 tons of the original Type 722 LCAC. It is claimed that the Jinsha II-class LCAC is roughly the same size as the United States Navy (USN) LCAC, and is designed for similar duties, but in reality, the Chinese equivalent of USN LCAC is actually slightly larger Type 726 LCAC. The Type 722 II entered production in limited numbers.

=== Description ===
The vessels measure 27 m (88 ft 7 in) long with a beam of 14 m (45 ft 11 in) and a height of 9.6 m (31 ft 6 in). They have a displacement of 70 tons and powered by two turbine engines for propulsion and two engines for lift, with the vessels propelled by two four-bladed variable-pitch propellers with a speed of 55 knots (102 km/h; 63 mph), a range of 165 nmi (306 km; 190 mi). They have capacity for 20 tons and are armed with two twin-mounted 14.5 mm machine guns.

== Type 726 LCAC ==
The Type 726 LCAC (NATO reporting name Yuyi class) is a development of Type 722 series LCAC. The Type 726 is usually carried by Type 071 amphibious transport docks, and up to four can be housed in the well deck of a Type 071 ship. Designed by Aviation Industry Corporation of China and constructed by Jiangnan Shipyard, the first unit was launched in December 2009 and entered Chinese service soon after. The Type 726 LCAC is frequently viewed as the Chinese equivalent of the USN LCAC due to their similar size and missions, but the Type 726 LCAC carries less cargo because the domestic Chinese engine for its LCAC is bulkier and heavier than that of the USN LCAC, but nonetheless, up to 60 t (59 long tons; 66 short tons) of cargo can be carried, enough for a Type 99 tank. In contrast, the USN LCAC can carry more around 70 tons of cargo. Most Chinese internet websites have claimed that the tank Type 726 LCAC will carry would most likely be the lighter Type 96, which will probably be adopted by People's Liberation Army Marine Corps than the heavier and costlier Type 99, but such claims have yet to be verified by official / governmental / western sources.

The Type 726 vessels have a length of 30 m (98 ft 5 in), a beam of 16 m (52 ft 6 in) and a displacement of 150–160 t (150–160 long tons). They are capable of speeds over 60 knots (110 km/h; 69 mph) depending on cargo load, but during sea trials, the LCAC reached 80 kn (150 km/h; 92 mph) when empty. They have a normal capacity for 50 tonnes, but can carry up to 60 tonnes at max capacity. They are equipped for but not with mounts for machine guns and grenade launchers.
