= Engin de débarquement amphibie rapide =

French naval landing craft

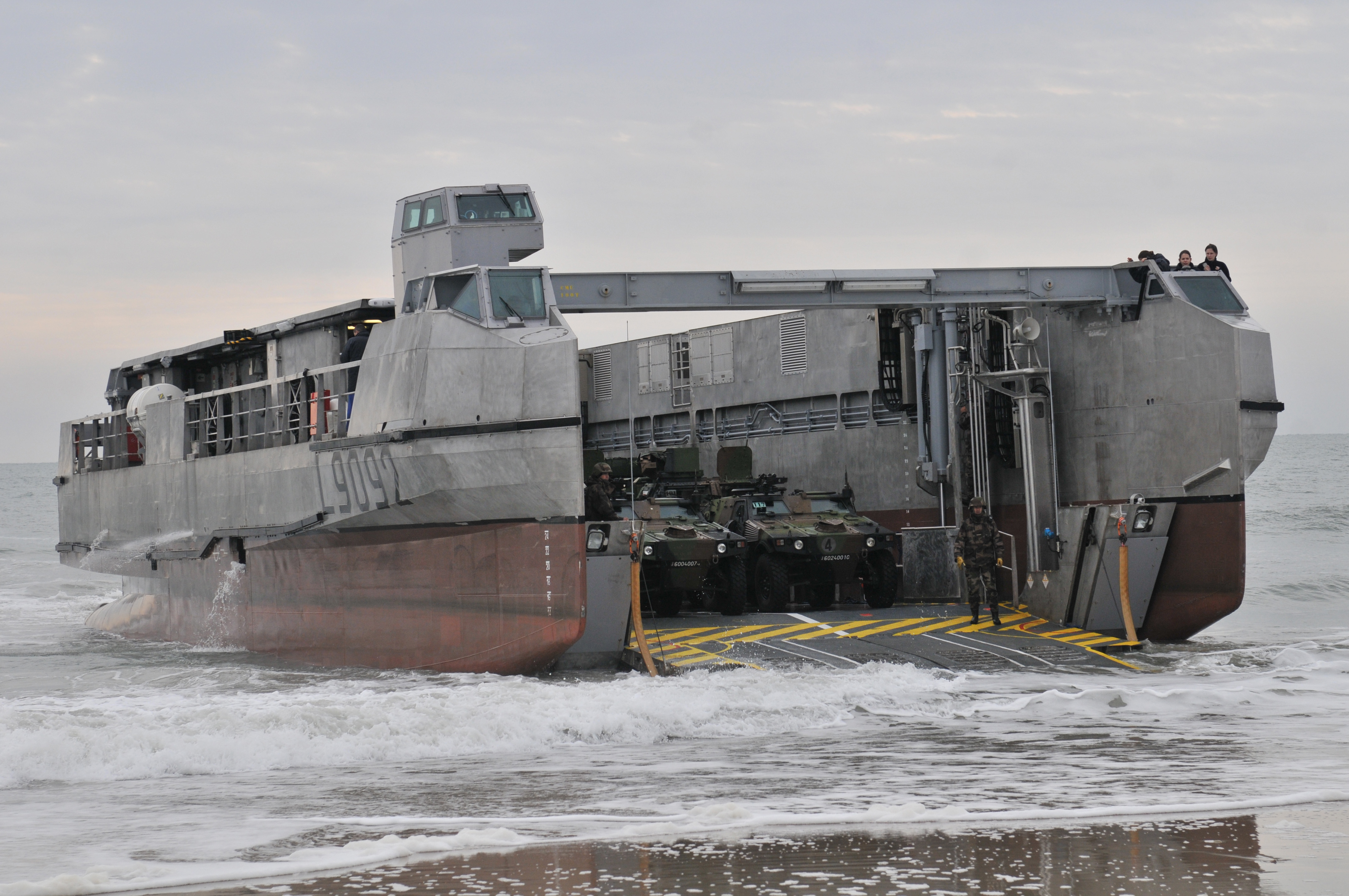
- An Engin de débarquement amphibie rapide coming ashore during a training exercise in 2012

Class overview
- Builders: Socarenam
- Operators: French Navy; Egyptian Navy
- Preceded by: CDIC
- Completed: 6

General characteristics
- Type: Roll-on/roll-off catamaran landing craft
- Displacement: 285 tons (light)
- Length: 30 m (98 ft 5 in)
- Beam: 12.8 m (42 ft 0 in)
- Draft: 2.5 m (8 ft 2 in) (fully catamaran mode); 0.6 m (2 ft 0 in) (fully load lighter mode)
- Propulsion: Four MTU Friedrichshafen 12V2000 M92 Diesel engines each producing 1220 kW; Four Wärtsilä Pump-jets
- Speed: 20 knots (37 km/h; 23 mph) (economical); 30 knots (56 km/h; 35 mph) (warranted)
- Range: 1,000 nmi (1,900 km; 1,200 mi) at 15 knots (28 km/h; 17 mph) (laden)
- Complement: 8
- Notes: Cargo capacity: 1 Cavalry Platoon including 3 Véhicule Blindé Léger and 3 AMX-10 RC or; 1 Reinforced Infantry Platoon including 6 Véhicule de l'Avant Blindé or; 1 Field Engineering Platoon or; 1 First-Aid Post.

The Engin de débarquement amphibie rapide (EDA-R) is a class of French roll-on/roll-off catamaran landing craft (L-CAT) operated by the French and Egyptian navies. They transport vehicles, cargo and personnel from Mistral-class amphibious assault ships to shore.

== Design and development ==
Concept design of the EDA-R began in 2000 at Constructions industrielles de la Méditerranée (CNIM) then was abandoned in 2003 and relaunched in 2008 with the full-scale Landing Catamaran (L-Cat). During the development stage, one prototype was built by Gamelin Shipyard and tested during an autonomous transfer from Saint-Malo to the Military port of Toulon. On 14 October 2008, the prototype of the L-Cat beached on the shores of Toulon. In March 2010, it offloaded a 54-ton Leclerc main battle tank at Toulon.

According to CNIM the craft delivers the performance of an aircushion landing craft but at the cost of a conventional landing craft. Four units have been purchased and were presented to the French Navy in January 2011.

In October 2016, CNIM revealed a new variant called L-CAT shore-to-shore, designed for smaller navies that do not have larger amphibious ships to deploy landing craft from. It has a bigger hull to accommodate more personnel and provide improved seakeeping, with an expanded length of 32.6 metres (106 ft 11 in) and beam of 13.2 metres (43 ft 4 in), with seating increased from 40 to 54. The L-CAT shore-to-shore can carry enough fuel to travel 1,000 nautical miles (1,900 km; 1,200 mi) without payload, or 800 nmi (1,500 km; 920 mi) with a 100-ton payload, and be able to move at 22 knots (41 km/h; 25 mph) empty and 15 knots (28 km/h; 17 mph) with a full load. Because of its potential to operate independently, it is fitted with the LYNCEA naval mission management system, and can be mounted with various features such as two unmanned 20 mm guns or a towed array system providing submarine detection capabilities.

== Operators ==
France

- French Navy (4 units)

Egypt

- Egyptian Navy (February 2015: 2 units)

== Specifications (EDA-R) ==

Source: Naval-Technology Fact File

- Builder: Socarenam
- Date Deployed: June 2011
- Propulsion:
  - Four MTU Friedrichshafen 12V2000 M92 Diesel engines 1220 kW
  - Four Wärtsilä Pump-jets
- Length: 30 metres (98 feet 43 inches)
- Beam: 12.8 metres (42 feet)
- Displacement: 285 metric tons
- Speed: 20 knots (37 km/h; 23 mph) with full load, 30 knots (56 km/h; 35 mph) maximum speed, 12 knots (22 km/h; 14 mph) platform lowered.
- Range: 400 nautical miles
- Crew: 8
- Load: 80 tons (110 tons overload in lighter mode)
- Military lift: cargo platform 126m² and 80 tons.
- Armament: two 12.7 mm and two 7.62 mm machine guns.
- Radar:

== See also ==
- Landing Craft Air Cushion
- Lebed-class LCAC
- Type 726 LCAC
- Solgae-class LCAC
- Tsaplya-class LCAC
- Zubr-class LCAC
