= Type 726 LCAC =

Chinese air-cushioned landing craft class

Class overview
- Builders: Jiangnan Shipyard
- Operators: PLA Navy Surface Force
- Preceded by: Type 724 LCAC
- In commission: 2010–present
- Building: 5
- Active: 40+

General characteristics
- Type: Air-cushioned landing craft
- Displacement: 150 tons (normal); 160 tons (full load)
- Length: 33 metres
- Beam: 16.8 metres
- Propulsion: 2 gas turbine engines
- Speed: 80 knots
- Range: 320 km
- Complement: 5 crew; 60 - 70 troops; 1 Type 96 main battle tank or 2 ZBD-05 infantry fighting vehicles
- Armament: 2 x 14.5 mm machine guns; 2 x 7.62 mm light machine gun

The Type 726 LCAC (with NATO reporting name Yuyi class), also known as the Wild Horse class LCAC (Chinese: 野马型气垫船) is a class of air-cushioned landing craft used by the People's Liberation Army Navy. Six Yuyi-class LCACs are believed to be in service with the People's Liberation Army (PLA), with the first one (3320) being seen at the end of 2007. It is thought that the vessels were delivered in two batches, with the first three LCACs reportedly powered by Ukrainian UGT 6000 engines, while the other subsequent production models are believed to use indigenous QC-70 gas turbines. Up to four Yuyi-class LCACs can be carried in the well deck of the Type 071 amphibious transport dock (LPD) and Type 075 landing helicopter dock (LHD).

The Type 726 LCAC is greater in size than the US LCACs in service, but smaller than the Zubr-class LCAC and can carry only one main battle tank (e.g., Type 96) or four armored vehicles.

The early variant, the Type 726, have encountered a number of technical problems that temporarily halted production of the class. This forced the four Type 071 LPDs to limit their projection capabilities to landing craft, amphibious IFVs and helicopters exclusively (not main battle tanks). However, recent commercial satellite imagery of China's Jiangnan Shipyard near Shanghai shows that the country is producing additional Yuyi-class LCACs. Eight Type 726As that appeared to be nearly completed could be seen at the yard on 14 October 2020.

Eight Type 726s were seen at a Chinese at Damiao Naval Base on Nansan Island on 26 September 2020.

== Ships of the class ==
| Pennant Number | Builder | Launched | Commissioned | Fleet | Status |
Type 726
| 3320 | Jiangnan Shipyard | | 2011 | South Sea Fleet | Active |
| 3321 | Jiangnan Shipyard | | 2013 | South Sea Fleet | Active |
| 3322 | Jiangnan Shipyard | | 2013 | South Sea Fleet | Active |
Type 726A
| 3330 | Jiangnan Shipyard | | 2016 | South Sea Fleet | Active |
| 3331 | Jiangnan Shipyard | | 2016 | South Sea Fleet | Active |
| 3332 | Jiangnan Shipyard | | 2016 | South Sea Fleet | Active |
| 3236 | Jiangnan Shipyard | | 10 January 2018 | East Sea Fleet | Active |
| 3237 | Jiangnan Shipyard | | 10 January 2018 | East Sea Fleet | Active |
| 3238 | Jiangnan Shipyard | | 10 January 2018 | East Sea Fleet | Active |
| 3239 | Jiangnan Shipyard | | 10 January 2018 | East Sea Fleet | Active |
| 3333 | Jiangnan Shipyard | | 2019 | South Sea Fleet | Active |
| 3334 | Jiangnan Shipyard | | 2019 | South Sea Fleet | Active |
| 3335 | Jiangnan Shipyard | | 2019 | South Sea Fleet | Active |
| 3336 | Jiangnan Shipyard | | 2019 | South Sea Fleet | Active |
| 3337 | Jiangnan Shipyard | | 2019 | South Sea Fleet | Active |

== Operators ==
China

- People's Liberation Army Navy (40+ units)

== See also ==
- Landing Craft Air Cushion
- Engin de débarquement amphibie rapide
- Lebed-class LCAC
- LSF-II 631
- Tsaplya-class LCAC – Three in service with ROKN
- Zubr-class LCAC
