= Chinese landing ship Yimeng Shan =

Type 071 amphibious transport dock

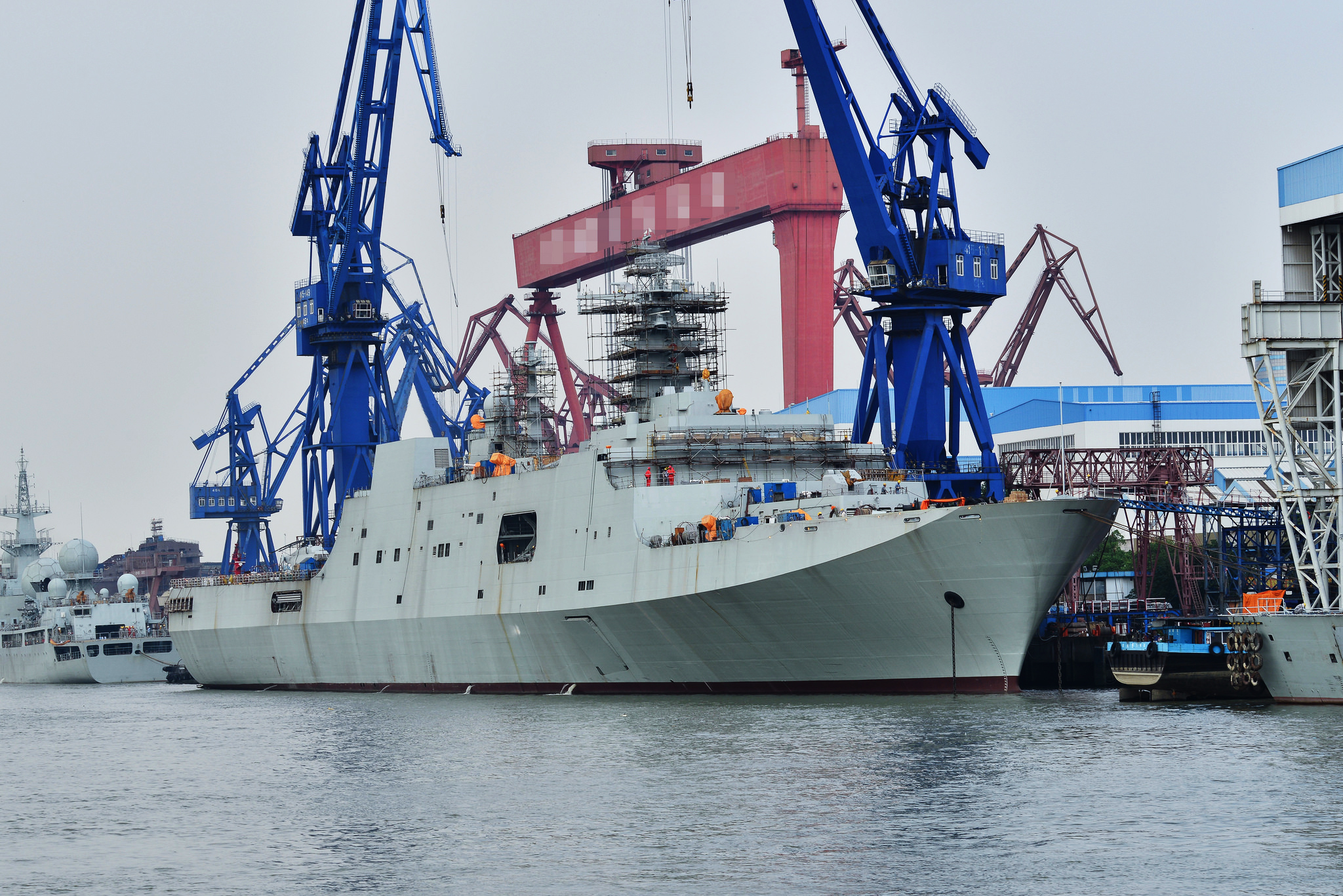
- Yimeng Shan in Shanghai on 28 July 2015

History

China
- Name: Yimeng Shan; (沂蒙山)
- Namesake: Yimeng Mountains
- Builder: Hudong-Zhonghua Shipyard, Shanghai
- Launched: 22 January 2015
- Commissioned: 1 February 2016
- Identification: Pennant number: 988
- Status: Active

General characteristics
- Class & type: Type 901 fast combat support ship
- Displacement: 25,000 tons full load.
- Length: 210 m (689 ft 0 in)
- Beam: 28 m (91 ft 10 in)
- Draft: 7 m (23 ft 0 in)
- Speed: 25 knots (46 km/h; 29 mph)
- Range: 10,000 nmi (19,000 km) at 18 knots (33 km/h; 21 mph)
- Boats & landing craft carried: 4 × Type 726 Yuyi class LCAC; Landing craft on port/starboard davits
- Capacity: Vehicles
- Troops: 600–800 troops
- Armament: 1 × AK-176 76 mm (3.0 in) gun; 4 × AK-630 30 mm (1.2 in) CIWS; 4 × 18-tube Type 726-4 decoy/chaff launcher; Possible installation of 2–4 heavy machine guns (Fitted for but not with)
- Aircraft carried: 4 × Z-8 Super Frelon
- Aviation facilities: Hangar and helipad

Yimeng Shan (988) is a Type 071 amphibious transport dock of the People's Liberation Army Navy.

== Development and design ==
Type 071 integrated landing ship (NATO code name: Yuzhao class) is a large dock landing ship of the Chinese People's Liberation Army Navy (PLAN). It can be used as the mother ship of the air-cushioned landing craft to transport soldiers, infantry fighting vehicles (IFVs), main battle tanks, etc. for landing operations. It can also carry amphibious vehicles, the hangar can accommodate four helicopters, and the deck can be used for two helicopters to take off and land.

The amphibious warfare ship features a vehicle deck, well deck, landing deck and a hangar. It can carry a combination of marines, vehicles, landing craft and helicopters. The ship may embark 600 to 800 troops. The stern helicopter deck offers two landing spots for supporting the operations of two Z-8 (SA 321 Super Frelon) transport helicopters. The twin-door cantilever hangar can house up to four Z-8 helicopters. The well deck houses up to four Type 726 air-cushioned landing craft, which can transfer vehicles or marines to the shore at high speed. The LCAC are launched by flooding of the docking area. The vessel can also carry landing craft on port / starboard davits. The vehicle deck can house amphibious assault vehicles including the ZBD05 amphibious IFV and the ZTD-05 amphibious light tank. The stern ramp, two side doors and ramps allow rapid loading of the vehicles and equipment.

The ship is armed with one 76 mm gun and four 30 mm close-in weapon systems.

The Type 071 may operate as the flagship of a task force. the Type 071 may also conduct and support humanitarian, disaster relief, and counterpiracy missions, in addition to amphibious assaults.

== Construction and career ==
She was launched on 22 January 2015 at Hudong-Zhonghua Shipyard in Shanghai and commissioned on 1 February 2016 into the East Sea Fleet.
