= Ship-to-Shore Connector =

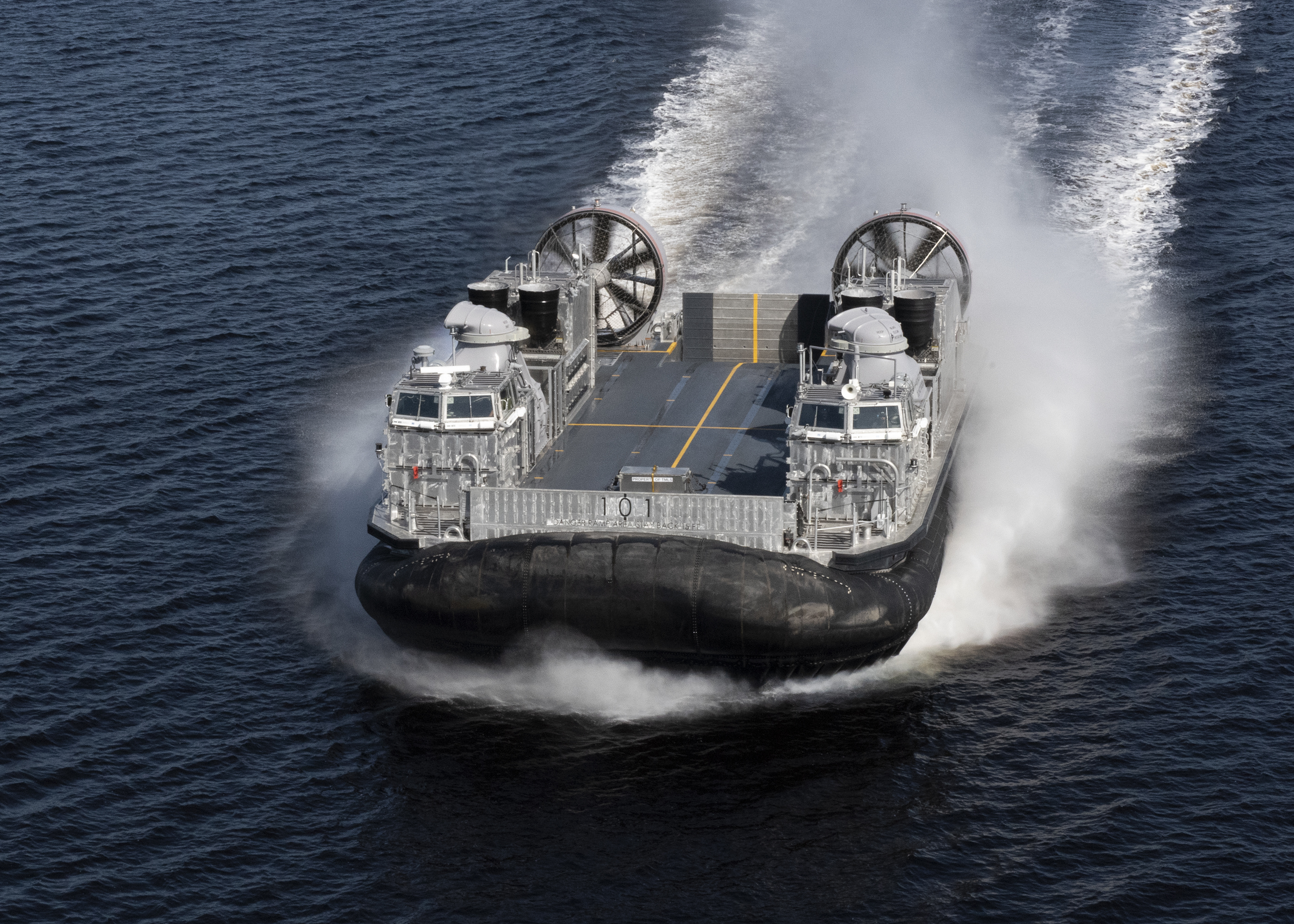
- Ship-to-Shore Connector LCAC 101 in September 2020
- Type: Air-cushioned landing craft
- Place of origin: United States

Service history
- In service: In development

Production history
- Unit cost: US$47.5m (FY15); US$55.5m (inc R&D) (FY15)
- No. built: 73 planned, 9 under contract.

Specifications
- Payload capacity: 74 tons or 145 Marines or 108 casualty personnel
- Maximum speed: Over 35 knots (>65 km/h)

The Ship-to-Shore Connector (SSC), also known as the LCAC 100 class, is a system proposed by the United States Navy as a replacement for the Landing Craft Air Cushion (LCAC). It will offer an increased capacity to cope with the growing weight of equipment used by the United States Army and Marine Corps. As of 2015, the program is forecast to cost a total of US$4.054B for 73 hovercraft.

== History ==
Several proposals have been made to replace the LCAC. In 2003, the Navy Transformation Roadmap set out plans to start R&D on a "Heavy Lift LCAC" project in 2005, but this was superseded by the LCAC(X) "LCAC Replacement Tactical Assault Connector". In August 2010, the US Navy issued a Request For Proposals for a contract to design and build 72 SSCs. The contract would be worth up to US$4 billion. A contract for detailed design work and construction of the first test and training craft, was expected to be awarded in 2011.

=== Proposals ===
- A team comprising Marinette Marine, Boeing, and Griffon Hoverwork
- A team comprising Textron Marine & Land Systems, Alcoa Defense, and L-3 Communications
- VT Halter

On 6 July 2012, the US Navy awarded Textron, Inc of New Orleans, LA a $212.7M fixed-priced incentive-fee contract for the detail design and construction of a Ship-to-Shore Connector test and training craft. The contract also includes the option for the production of eight additional craft; this option would increase total value of the contract to $570.4M. Textron began fabrication of the first nine SSCs in mid-November 2014. These were to be delivered in 2017 and achieve initial operating capability (IOC) in 2020. Textron can produce as many as 12 SSCs per year.

The first SSC was delivered on 6 February 2020. By June 2026, 17 SSCs had been delivered.

== Design ==
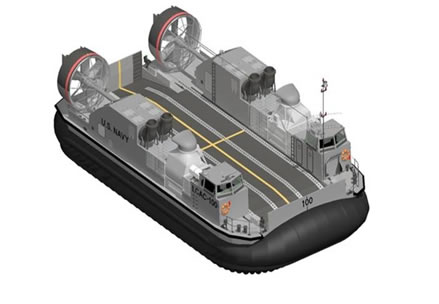
A concept image of the design

Although the design will be broadly similar to the LCAC, there will be several significant differences:

- Two-person Fly-by-wire cockpit with joystick controls
- More powerful, more efficient engines
- Extensive use of composites and aluminum alloys for corrosion resistance
- Advanced skirt instead of a deep skirt for less drag and reduced craft weight

The four Rolls-Royce MT7 gas turbines that will be used to power each Ship-to-Shore Connector are derivatives modelled after the design of the Rolls-Royce T406 used in the Bell Boeing V-22 Osprey. The cores of the two engines types are identical, which should provide some relief in spare parts storage to those ships that will operate both the (tiltrotor) aircraft and the hovercraft. Top speed will be 50 kn (58 mph; 93 km/h). A simpler and more efficient drivetrain using one gearbox is on each side for fewer parts, less maintenance and higher reliability.

The SSC has a designed lifetime of 30 years.

The tenth SSC to be delivered will have the capability to launch vehicles into the water rather than travel to the beach. That ability will then be retrofitted to the previous nine vessels.

== See also ==
- Zubr-class LCAC
