= Icac (disambiguation) =

The Internet Crimes Against Children Task Force, commonly shortened to ICAC, is a US network of 61 coordinated law enforcement and prosecutorial task forces.

ICAC may also refer to:

== Governmental agencies ==
=== Australia ===
- Independent Commission Against Corruption (New South Wales), an integrity agency of the Government of New South Wales
- Independent Commissioner Against Corruption (Northern Territory), an integrity agency of the Northern Territory Government
- Independent Commission Against Corruption (South Australia), a South Australian integrity agency and law enforcement body

=== Other countries ===
- Financial Crimes Commission (Mauritius) (previously the Independent Commission Against Corruption), the anti-corruption agency of Mauritius
- Independent Commission Against Corruption (Hong Kong), the statutory independent anti-corruption body of Hong Kong

== Sports organizations ==
- Heartland Collegiate Athletic Conference (previously the Indiana Collegiate Athletic Conference), an intercollegiate athletic conference affiliated with the NCAA's Division III
- Intermountain Collegiate Athletic Conference, a junior college athletic conference composed of member schools

== Other organizations ==
- Institute of Chartered Accountants of the Caribbean, an association of accounting organizations in the Caribbean region
- International Certification Accreditation Council, an alliance of organizations for assuring quality service to the public
- International Cotton Advisory Committee, an association of governments of cotton producing, consuming and trading countries

== See also ==
- Crime and Corruption Commission – State government commission in Queensland, Australia
- Independent Broad-based Anti-corruption Commission – Integrity agency in Victoria, Australia
- LCAC (disambiguation)
