= LCAT =

LCAT or L-CAT may refer to:

- Engin de débarquement amphibie rapide, a catamaran landing craft
- Lecithin–cholesterol acyltransferase, an animalian enzyme involved in cholesterol metabolism
- Lyon County Area Transportation, a municipal bus company in Emporia, Kansas, United States
- LUMS Common Admission Test, for Lahore University of Management Sciences
