= Landing Craft Air Cushion =

Hovercraft employed as a landing craft

LCAC
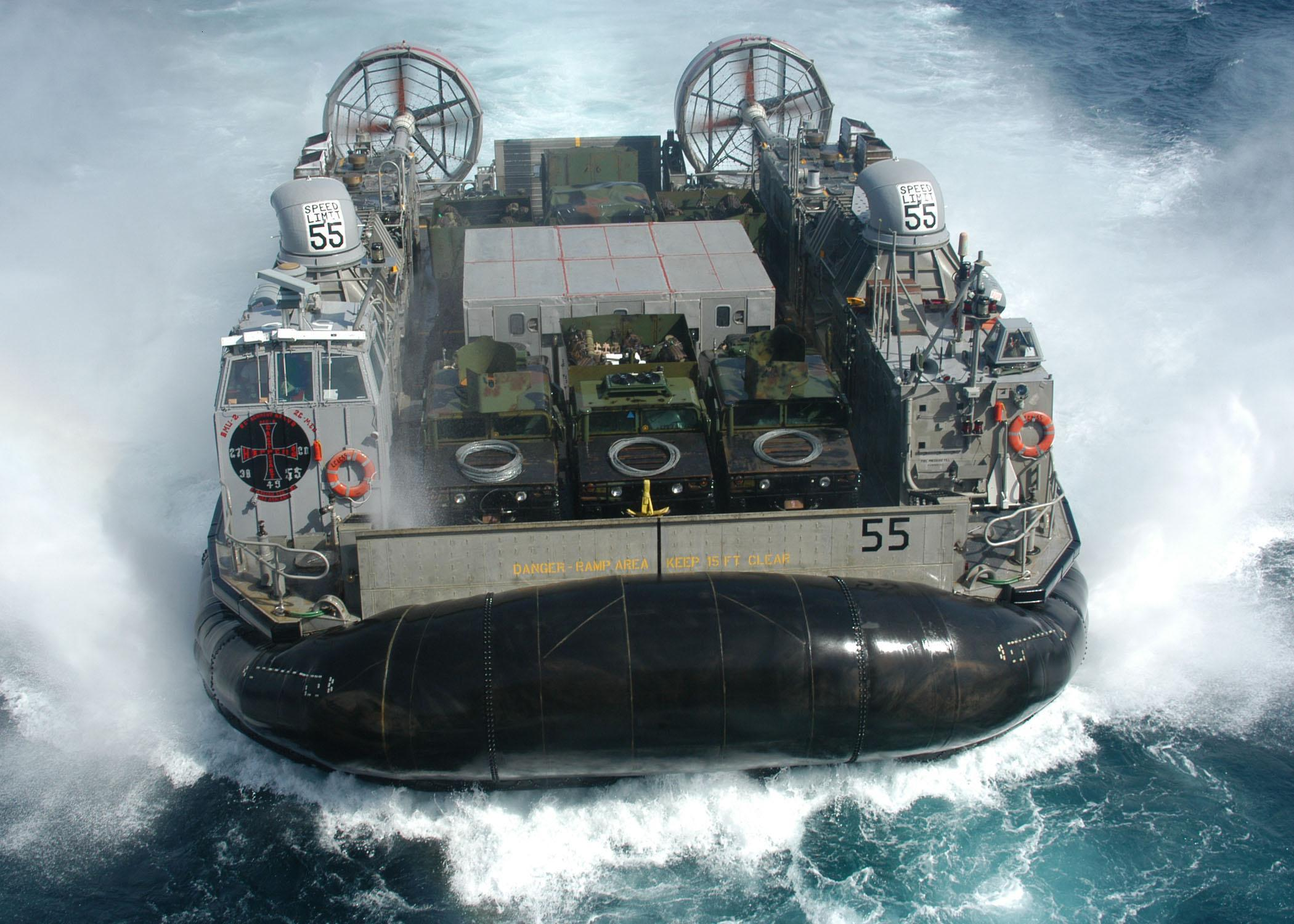
- A US Navy LCAC maneuvers to enter the well deck of the amphibious assault ship USS Kearsarge
- Type: Landing craft
- Place of origin: United States

Service history
- In service: 1986–present

Production history
- Manufacturer: Textron Marine and Land Systems; Avondale Gulfport Marine
- Unit cost: $27 million (1996); ~$41 million (2015)
- No. built: 97

Specifications
- Mass: 182 long tons (185 t) full load
- Length: 87 feet 11 inches (26.80 meters)
- Width: 47 feet (14 meters)
- Crew: 5
- Main armament: Two M240B machine guns. Gun mounts will support: Mk 19 Mod 3 40 mm grenade launcher.
- Engine: 4 Avco Lycoming TF40B, 4,390 shp (3,270 kW) each (as built); 4 Vericor Power Systems ETF40B, 4,700 shp (3,500 kW) each (after SLEP)
- Payload capacity: 60 short tons (up to 75 short tons in an overload condition)(54/68 metric tons)
- Operational range: 200 nmi at 40 kn (370 km at 75 km/h) without payload 300 nmi at 35 kn (550 km at 65 km/h) without payload
- Maximum speed: 40+ knots (46+ mph; 74 km/h) with full load, 70+ knots maximum speed

The Landing Craft Air Cushion (LCAC) is a class of air-cushioned landing craft (hovercraft) used by the United States Navy and the Japan Maritime Self-Defense Force (JMSDF). They transport weapons systems, equipment, cargo and personnel from ship to shore and across the beach. It is to be replaced in US service by the Ship-to-Shore Connector (SSC).

== Design and development ==
Two prototypes were built; JEFF A by Aerojet General in California, JEFF B by Bell Aerospace, with sea trials starting in late 1977.

JEFF A had four rotating ducted propellers. JEFF B had two ducted rear propellers similar to the proposed SK-10 which was derived from the previous Patrol Air Cushion Vehicle operated in South Vietnam. JEFF B was selected for the LCAC in 1981. JEFF A was later modified for Arctic use and deployed in Prudhoe Bay to support offshore oil drilling.

The first 33 were included in the FY82-86 defense budgets, 15 in FY89, and 12 each in FY90, FY91, and FY92, while 7 were included in FY93. Compared to the prototypes, production LCACs replaced the six Avco Lycoming TF40s with four more powerful TF40Bs. The first LCAC was delivered to the Navy in 1984 and Initial Operational Capability (IOC) was achieved in 1986. Approval for full production was granted in 1987.

After an initial 15-craft competitive production contract was awarded to each of two companies, Textron Marine & Land Systems (TMLS) of New Orleans and Avondale Gulfport Marine, TMLS was selected to build the remaining craft. The final craft was delivered in 2001.

On 29 June 1987, approval was granted for full LCAC production. Forty-eight air-cushion landing craft were authorized and appropriated through FY 89. Lockheed Shipbuilding Company was competitively selected as a second source. The FY 1990 budget request included $219.3 million for nine craft. The FY 1991 request included full funding for 12 LCACs and advance procurement in support of the FY 1992 program (which was intended to be nine craft). The remaining 24 were funded in FY92.

== Operations and craft crew ==
The LCAC first deployed in 1987 aboard USS Germantown. LCACs are transported in and operate from all the U.S. Navy's amphibious ships that are equipped with well decks, including LHAs, LHDs, LSDs, and LPDs. Ships capable of carrying the LCAC include the Wasp (3 LCACs), Tarawa (1), Whidbey Island (4–5), Harpers Ferry (2), and San Antonio (2) classes.

All of the planned 91 craft were delivered. Seventeen have since been disassembled or terminated for cost reasons, two are held for R&D, and thirty-six are in use on each coast at Little Creek, Virginia, and Camp Pendleton, California. Eight minesweeping kits were acquired in 1994–1995. A service-life extension program (SLEP) to extend service life from 20 to 30 years for the remaining 72 active LCACs began in 2000 and was scheduled to be completed by 2018.

The craft operates with a crew of five enlisted sailors in the following positions: craft master, navigator, craft engineer, deck engineer, and loadmaster. The craft master is in charge of piloting the craft, crew coordination, crew safety, and craft safety and can terminate a mission if weather or craft conditions preclude mission accomplishment. The craft engineer is responsible for powerplant monitoring, is cross-trained as a secondary craft master in case the craft master becomes incapacitated, is the subject matter expert on craft mechanical and electrical systems, and oversees maintenance during missions. The navigator is in charge of plotting safe lanes of travel, making in-flight course changes, ensuring on-time beach landings, logging the weight of transported equipment, and communicating with other craft and ground forces. The deck engineer is in charge of completing repairs during missions, cross-trains as a craft engineer in case the craft engineer becomes incapacitated, leads on-deck firefighting, and aids the loadmaster in loading and off-loading cargo and troops. The loadmaster is in charge of all deck evolutions; movement of equipment, cargo, and troops during on loading and off-loading; proper loading of cargo on deck to maintain proper weight and balance and leveling; anchoring, mooring, and rigging for tow operations; ensuring the proper use of cargo restraints; maintenance of craft armament; and distribution of weapons and ammunition. The loadmaster also acts as the port lookout while in flight.

In addition to beach landings, LCAC provides personnel transport, evacuation support, lane breaching, mine countermeasure operations, casualty transport, and Marine and Special Warfare equipment delivery. The four main engines are all used for lift and all used for main propulsion while two smaller auxiliary generator engines, Auxiliary Power Units (APU), provide craft electrical power.. The craft can continue to operate, at reduced capability, with two engines inoperable, one lift fan inoperable, and one APU inoperable. Main engines are interchangeable for redundancy and ease of maintenance. A Personnel Transport Module (PTM) can be assembled on the cargo deck of the craft. They can seat 180 troops, 120 combat loaded troops, and can additionally be converted to transport 54 casualties for medical treatment.

The LCAC's cargo capacity is 1,809 sq ft (168.1 m^{2}), slightly less if cold weather kit is installed for winter and Arctic operations. The LCAC is capable of carrying a 60 short-ton payload (up to 75 tons in an overload condition), including one M-1 Abrams tank, at speeds over 40 knots. Fuel capacity is 5000 gallons. The LCAC uses an average of 1000 gallons per hour.

Maneuvering considerations include requiring 500 yards or more to stop and 2000 yards or more turning radius. The bow ramp is 28.8 ft (8.8 m) wide while the stern ramp is 15 ft (4.6 m) wide. Noise and dust levels are high with this craft. If disabled the craft is difficult to tow. In recent years spray suppression has been added to the craft's skirt to reduce interference with driver's vision.

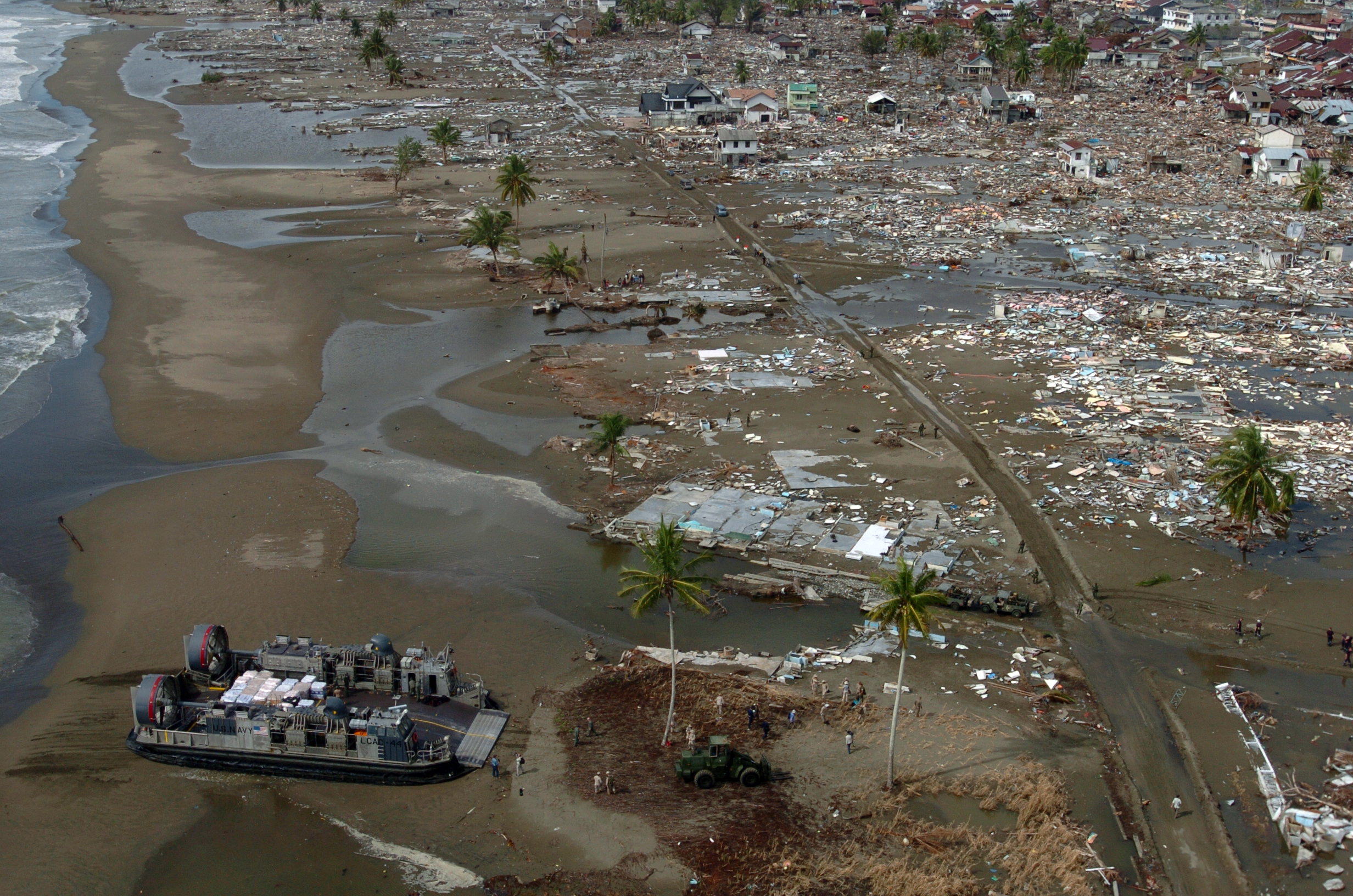
An LCAC is delivering supplies to the citizens of Meulaboh, Indonesia after the 2004 Indian Ocean tsunami.

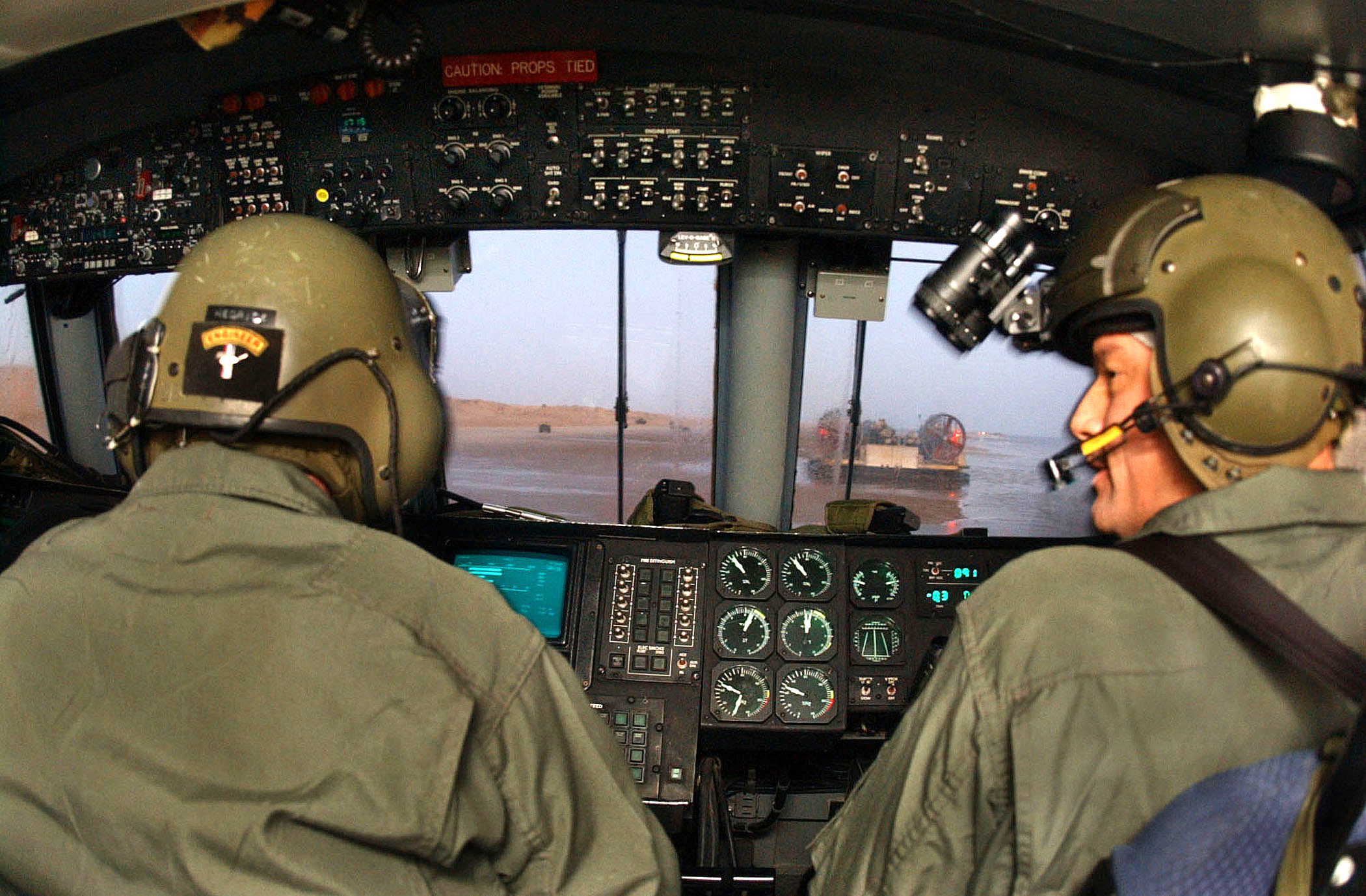
US Navy sailors pilot an LCAC transporting U.S. Marines ashore.

=== SLEP ===
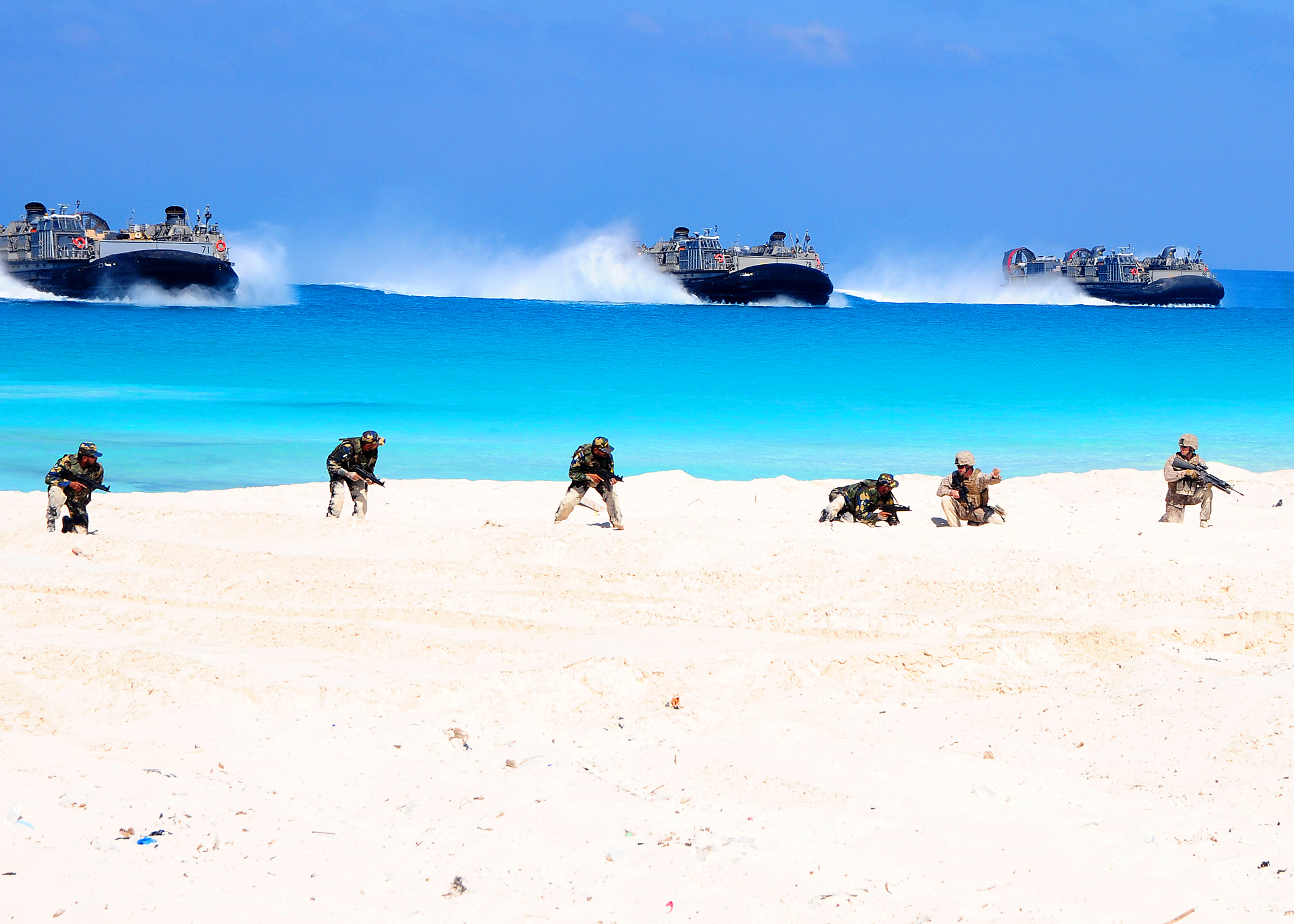
Three LCACs conduct an amphibious assault exercise during Bright Star '09.

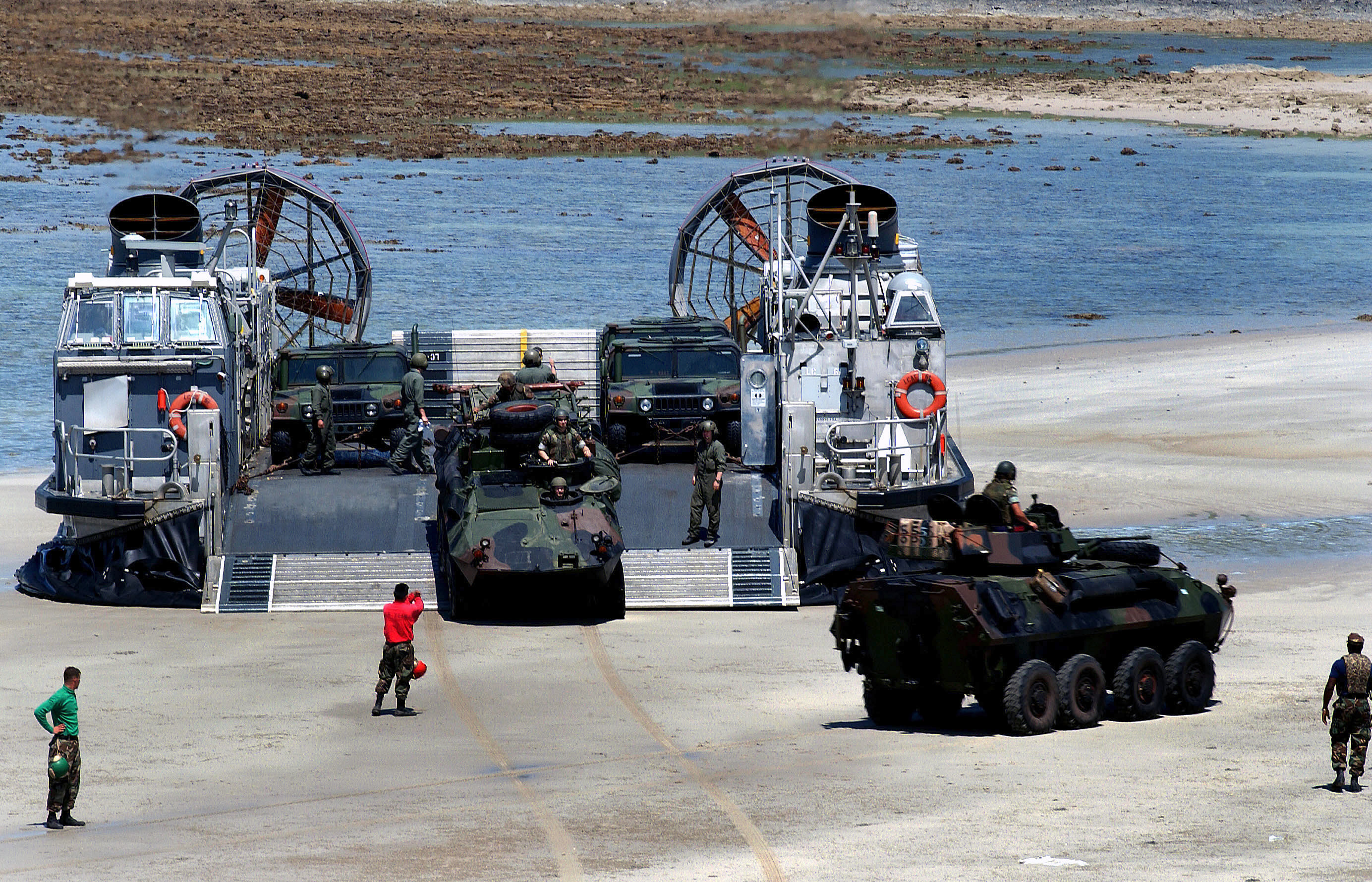
USMC LAV-25s and HMMWVs are offloaded from a USN LCAC craft at Samesan RTMB, Thailand.

In Fiscal Year 2000 the Navy started an LCAC Service Life Extension Program (SLEP) to add 10 years of design life to each craft. The SLEP will be applied to 72 LCACs, extending their service life from 20 to 30 years.

Phase I. Replacing electronics components with readily available commercial Off-The-Shelf (COTS) components. The new electronics suite will be more reliable and less costly to operate and maintain.

Phase II. Buoyancy box replacement at the Textron Marine and Land Systems facility in New Orleans, LA, to increase the LCACs resistance to corrosion. Phase II will also include the electronics upgrade of Phase I, until the entire active fleet is outfitted with the new configuration. The new buoyancy box will incorporate improvements to damage stability and trim control of the LCACs.

NAVSEA transitioned from the research and development effort to the SLEP in 1999. Concurrently NAVSEA also considered additional SLEP options, including an enhanced engine to provide improved operation in excessively hot environments and an advanced skirt that is more reliable and cost effective.

The Navy continued the LCAC Service Life Extension Program in Fiscal Year 2001. This program combines major structural improvements with Command, Control, Communications, Computer and Navigation upgrades and adds 10 years to the service life, extending it to 30 years. In FY 2001, it was funded at $19.9 million and extended the service life of 1 craft. The SLEP is planned for a total of 72 craft.

The near-term focus will be on the "C4N" [Command, Control, Communications, Computers, and Navigation] program, to replace the crafts' obsolete equipment. This will focus on replacement of LN-66 radars with modern, high-power P-80 radar systems. Additionally, the SLEP will include an open-architecture concept, relying on modern commercial-off-the-shelf (COTS) equipment, which will allow much easier incorporation of later technology changes, such as the precision navigation system and communications systems ¾ fully interoperable with in-service and near-term future Joint systems ¾ now planned. The C4N program is to complete by 2010.

Through 2016, the Navy will look to incorporate other important service-life enhancements: Engine upgrades (ETF-40B configuration) that will provide additional power and lift particularly in hot (43 °C (109 °F), and higher) environments, reduced fuel consumption, reduced maintenance needs, and reduced lift footprint; Replacement of the buoyancy box to solve corrosion problems, incorporate hull improvements, and "reset" the fatigue-limit "clock"; Incorporation of a new (deep) skirt that will reduce drag, increase performance envelope over water and land, and reduce maintenance requirements.

As of September 2012, there were 80 LCACs in the U.S. Navy inventory; 39 LCACs had undergone the SLEP conversion and 7 were in progress and 4 are awaiting induction. The FY 2013 budget authorized 4 SLEP conversions per year through FY 2018. The last of the 72 SLEP conversions will be delivered to the Navy in FY 2020. After the first SLEP LCAC reached its 30 years design service age in 2015, it was to gradually be retired. In 2019, at which point the inventory of LCACs had fallen to 50, the USN began receiving the new Ship-to-Shore Connector (SSC), the LCAC-100.

The USN inventory of LCACs was projected to fall until 2023 after which SSC replacements would increase it.

== Japanese operations ==
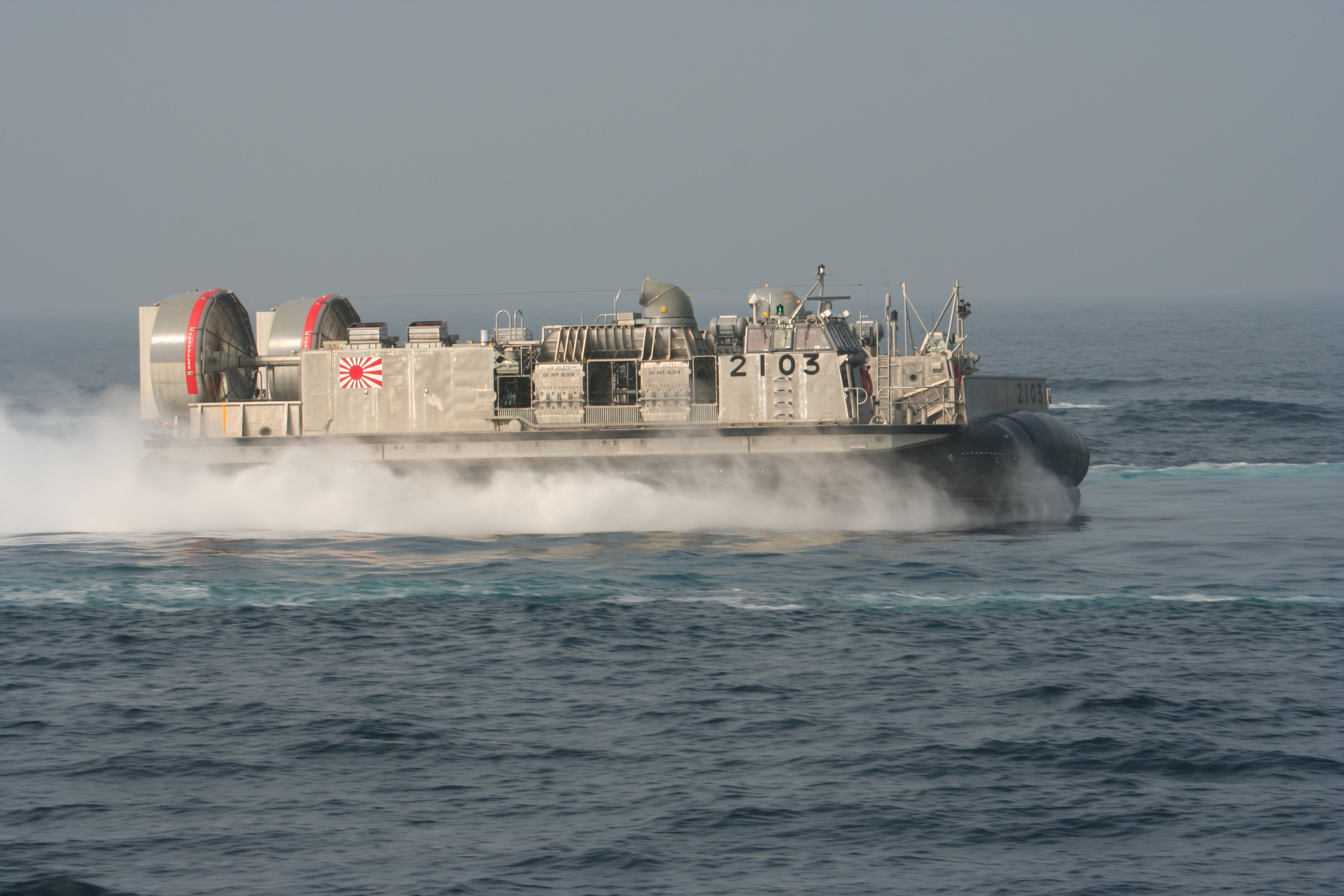
A JMSDF LCAC at Naval Review

Six LCAC are in use by the Japan Maritime Self-Defense Force. Approval for the sale was given by the United States Government on 8 April 1994. The craft were built by Textron Marine & Land Systems in New Orleans, Louisiana. Purchase of the first craft was included in the FY93 budget, second in FY95, third and fourth in FY99 and fifth and sixth in FY00.

== Operators ==
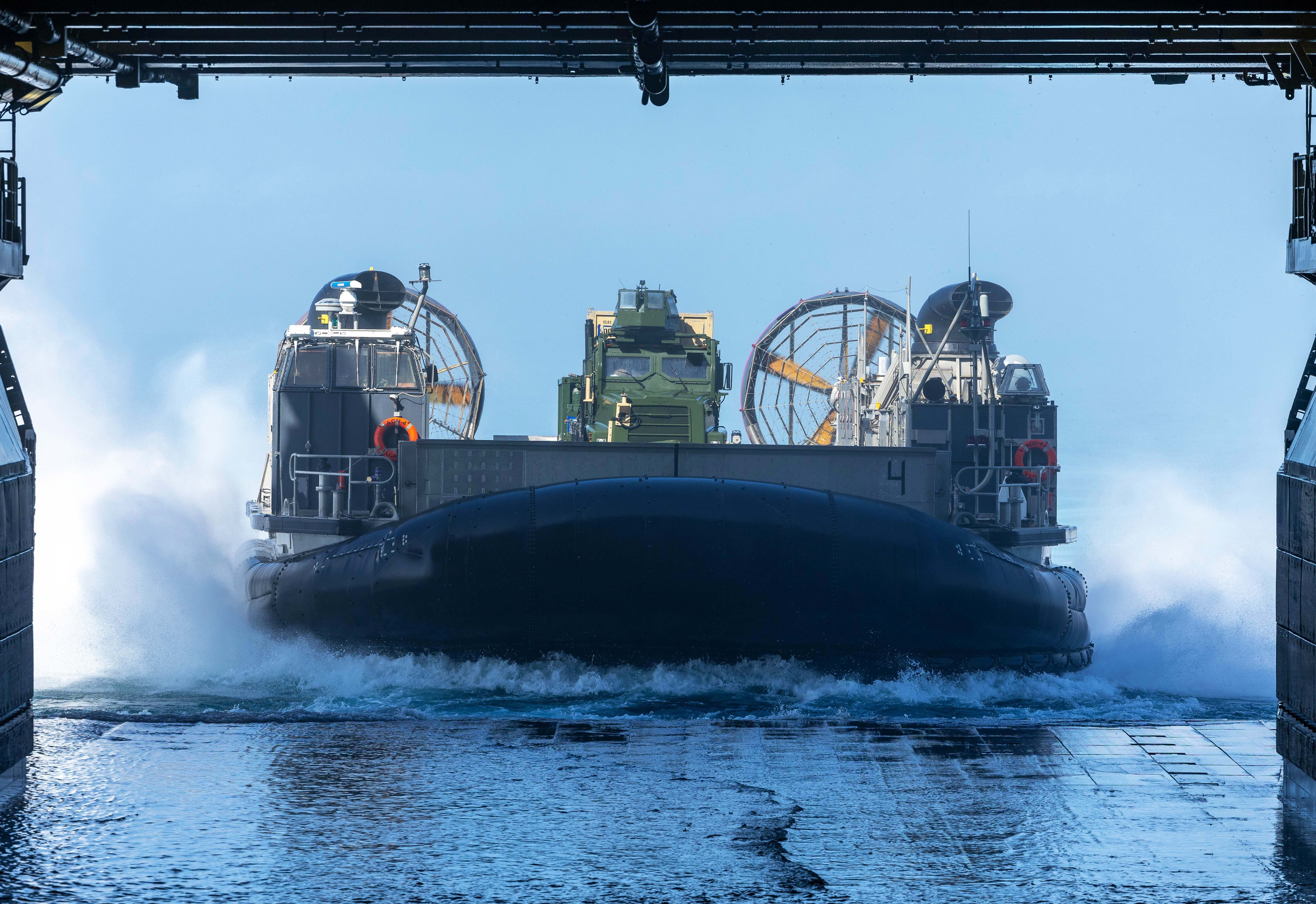
US Navy Assault Craft Unit 4 sailors prepare for docking aboard the USS Iwo Jima (2025)

- Japan
  - Japan Maritime Self-Defense Force (6 units)
- United States
  - United States Navy (74 units).
    - Assault Craft Unit 4
    - Assault Craft Unit 5
    - Naval Beach Unit 7 (Sasebo, Japan)

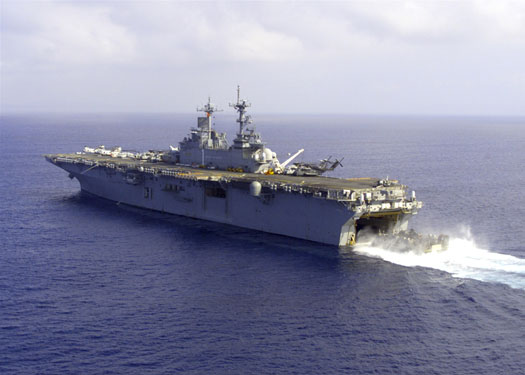
A USN LCAC approaches USS Wasp.

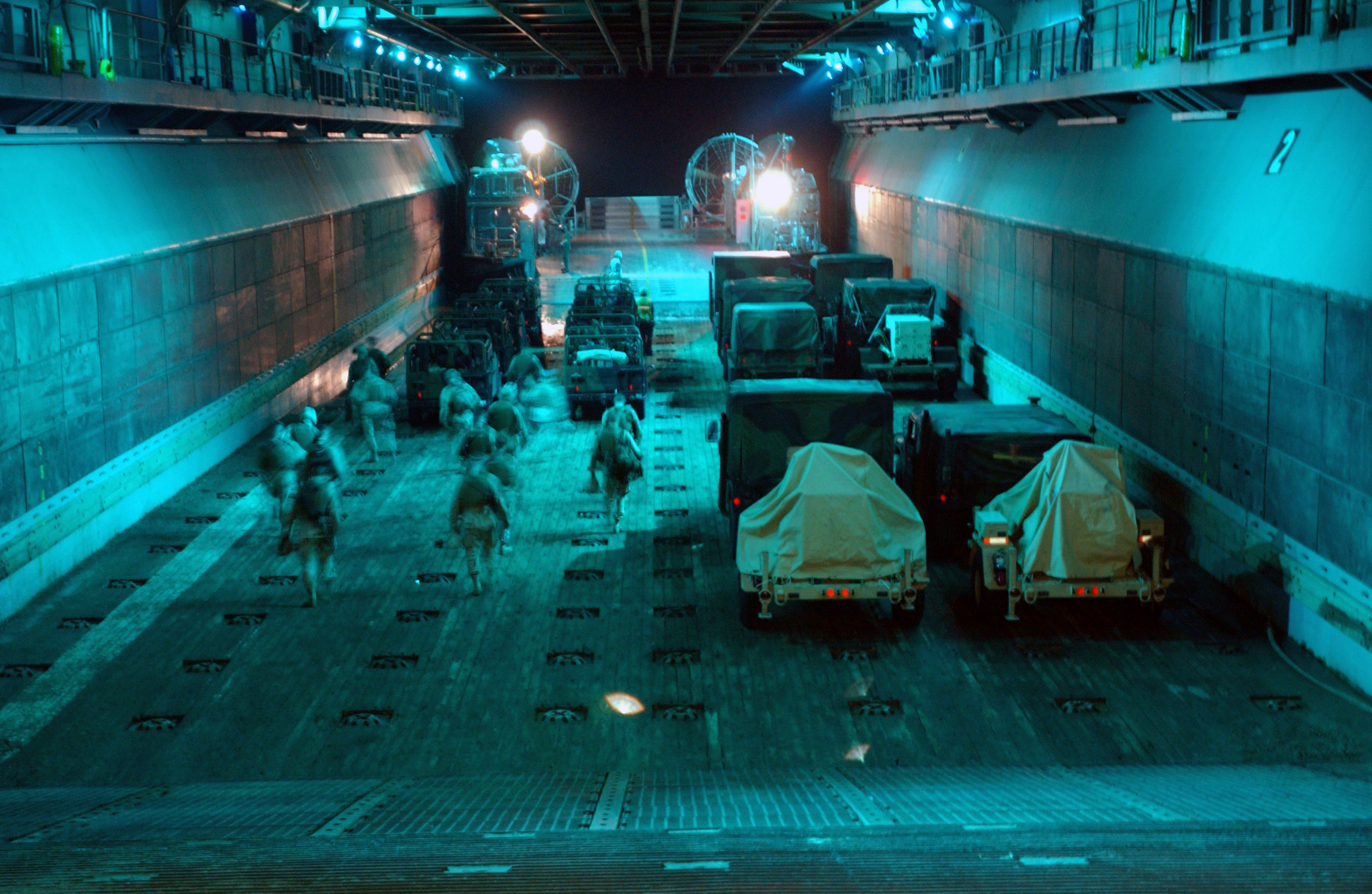
US Marines loading onto an LCAC within the well deck of USS Wasp, 2004

== See also ==
- Ship-to-Shore Connector
- Air-cushioned landing craft
- Lebed-class LCAC
- Type 726 LCAC
- Solgae-class LCAC
- Tsaplya-class LCAC – Three in service with ROKN
- Zubr-class LCAC
