= Gus-class LCAC =

Soviet naval landing craft (1969–1990s)

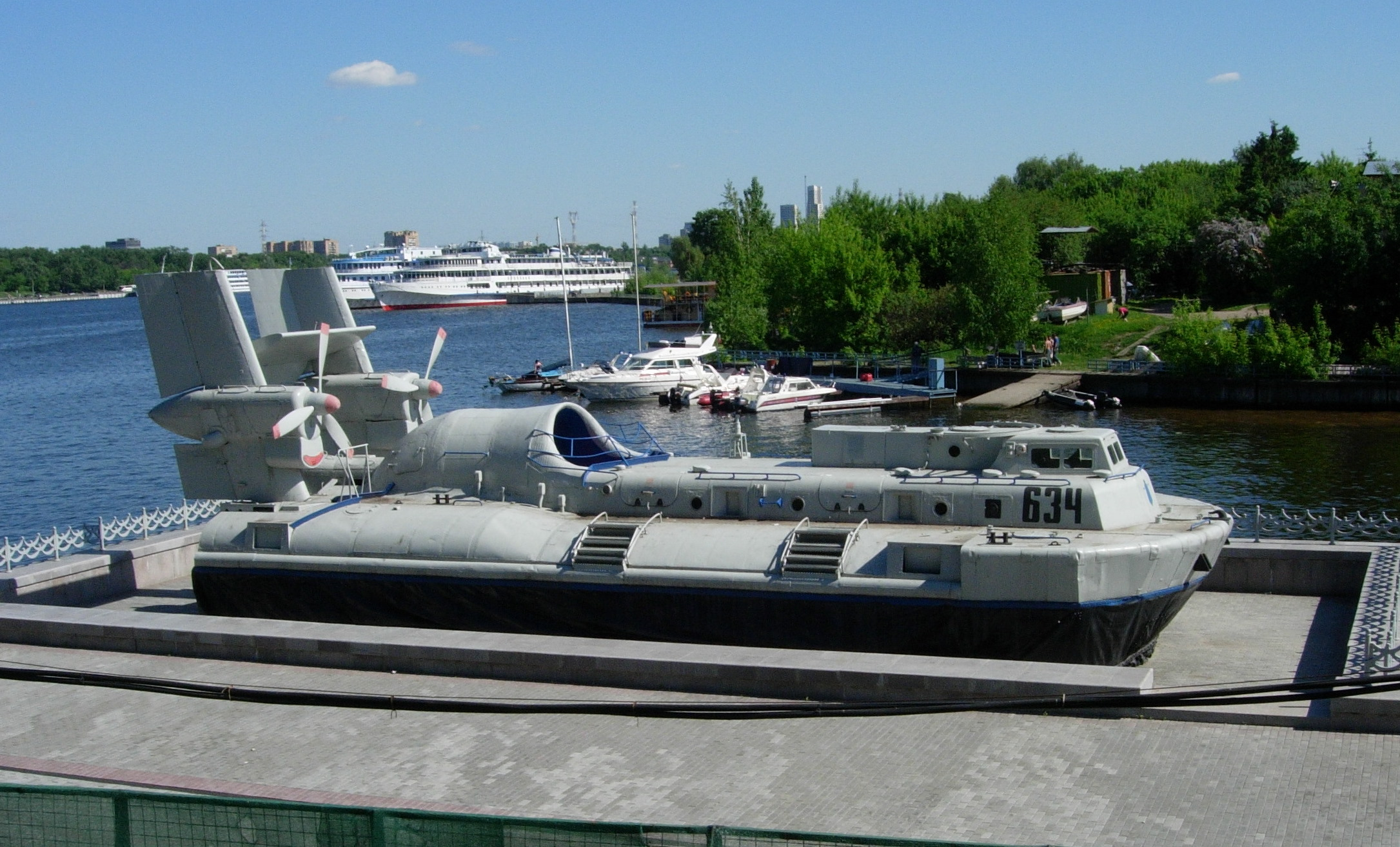

Class overview
- Builders: Primorsky Shipyard Almaz, More, Zelenodolsk
- Operators: Soviet Navy
- Succeeded by: Tsaplya class; Lebed class
- Built: 1969–1974
- In commission: 1969–1990s
- Completed: 32
- Scrapped: 32

General characteristics
- Type: Landing Craft Air Cushion
- Displacement: 27 long tons (27 t)
- Length: 21.4 m (70 ft 3 in)
- Beam: 7.8 m (25 ft 7 in)
- Propulsion: 3 × TVD 10 2350 hp (2 of which TVD-10M) 780 hp (582 kW) gas turbines (1 lift, 2 propulsion); 2 × three-bladed variable-pitch propellers
- Speed: 60 knots (110 km/h; 69 mph)
- Range: 230 nmi (430 km; 260 mi) at 43 kn (80 km/h; 49 mph); 185 nmi (343 km; 213 mi) at 50 kn (93 km/h; 58 mph)
- Troops: 25 assault troops with equipment
- Complement: 6
- Armament: None

The Gus-class LCAC code Project 1205 Skat was a medium-sized assault hovercraft operated by the Soviet Navy from 1969 until the early 1990s.

== See also ==
- List of ships of the Soviet Navy
- List of ships of Russia by project number
