= Type 071 amphibious transport dock =

Class of ship in service with the Chinese People's Liberation Army Navy

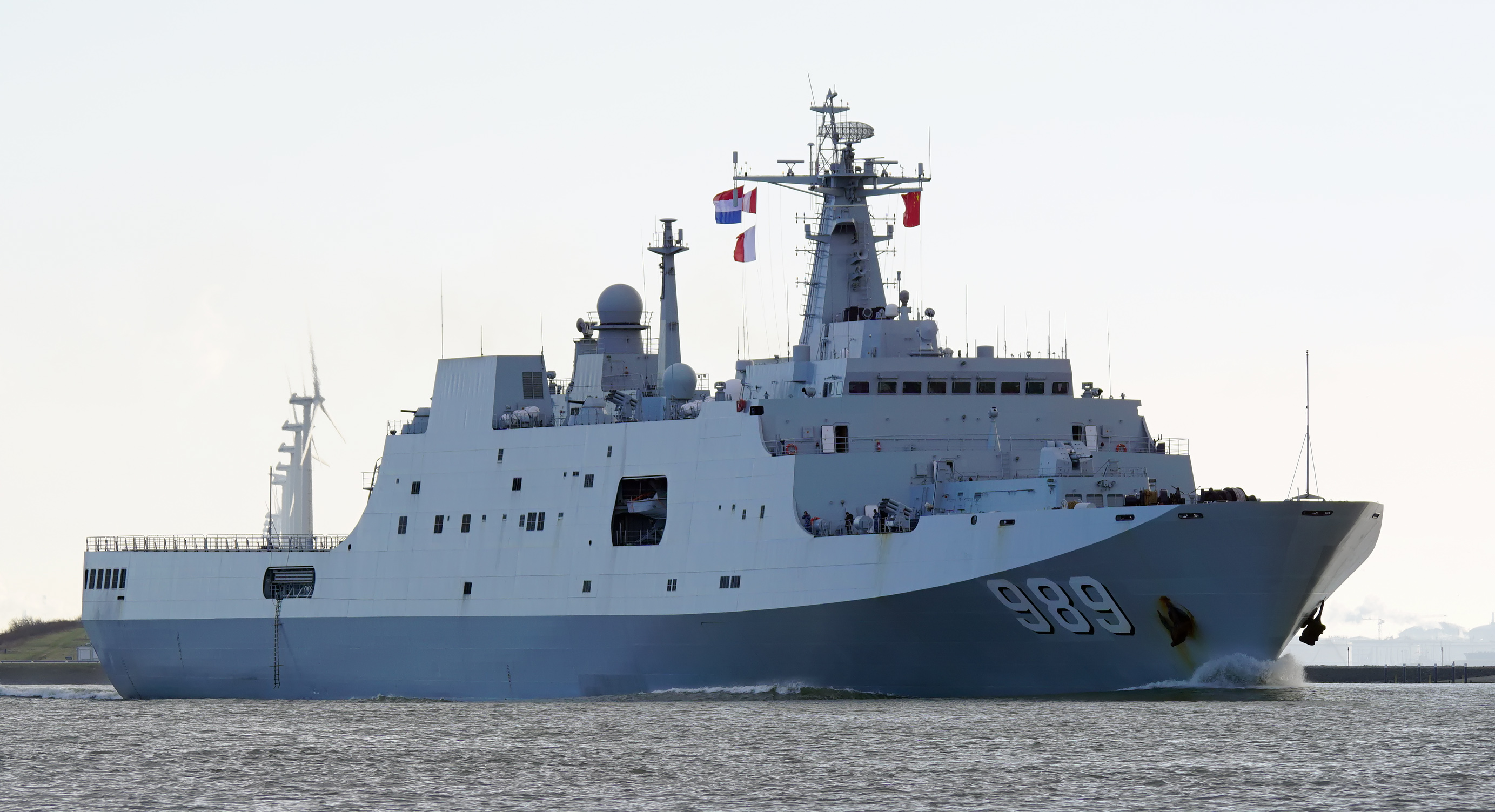
- Type 071 amphibious transport dock ship Changbai Shan

Class overview
- Builders: Hudong-Zhonghua Shipbuilding, Shanghai, China; COMEC, Guangzhou, China
- Operators: People's Liberation Army Navy; Royal Thai Navy
- Succeeded by: Type 075 landing helicopter dock
- Built: 2006–present
- In service: 2007–present
- On order: At least 5 (People's Liberation Army Navy)
- Building: 4
- Completed: 10
- Active: Total 9: 8 (People's Liberation Army Navy); 1 (Royal Thai Navy)

General characteristics
- Type: Amphibious transport dock
- Displacement: 25,000 tons full load.
- Length: 210 m (689 ft 0 in)
- Beam: 28 m (91 ft 10 in)
- Draft: 7 m (23 ft 0 in)
- Speed: 25 knots (46 km/h; 29 mph)
- Range: 10,000 nmi (19,000 km) at 18 knots (33 km/h; 21 mph)
- Boats & landing craft carried: 4 × Type 726 Yuyi class LCAC; Landing craft on port/starboard davits
- Capacity: 60 armoured fighting vehicles
- Troops: 800 troops
- Armament: 1 × AK-176 76 mm (3.0 in) gun; 4 × AK-630 30 mm (1.2 in) CIWS; 4 × 18-tube Type 726-4 decoy/chaff launchers; Possible installation of 2–4 heavy machine guns (Fitted for but not with)
- Aircraft carried: 4 Harbin Z-8

The Type 071 (NATO reporting name: Yuzhao) is a class of Chinese amphibious transport dock ships in service with the People's Liberation Army Navy (PLAN). The Type 071 provides the PLAN with capabilities and flexibility not found in its previous landing ships.

== Design ==
The amphibious warfare ship features a vehicle deck, well-deck, landing deck and a hangar. It can carry a combination of marines, vehicles, landing craft and helicopters. The ship may embark 600 to 800 troops. The stern helicopter deck has two landing spots, each supporting a Harbin Z-8 (SA 321 Super Frelon variant) transport helicopter. The twin-door cantilever hangar can house up to four Z-8 helicopters. The well deck houses up to four Type 726 air-cushioned landing craft, which can transfer vehicles or marines to the shore at high speed.

The LCAC are launched by flooding of the docking area. The vessel can carry landing craft on port / starboard davits. The vehicle deck can house amphibious assault vehicles including the ZBD05 amphibious IFV and the ZTD-05 amphibious light tank. The stern ramp, two side doors and ramps allow rapid loading of the vehicles and equipment.

The ship is armed with one 76 mm gun and four 30 mm close-in weapon systems. A Type 071 hull (986) was modified with a laser-based directed energy weapon added to the vessel's forward superstructure in 2024, reflecting the configuration of a similar weapon installed on the San Antonio-class ship USS Portland.

The Type 071 may operate as the flagship of a task force. The Type 071 may also conduct and support humanitarian, disaster relief, and counterpiracy missions, in addition to amphibious assaults.

== Export ==
The China State Shipbuilding and Trading Corp. consortium offered to build a modified Type 071 for the Royal Malaysian Navy. The Malaysians had a requirement for a 13,000-ton LPD; the Type 071 would cost a third of the similar US-built San Antonio-class LPD.

The Royal Thai Navy ordered one export version, designated Type 071E, in 2019. In April 2023, the ship was delivered to the Royal Thai Navy.

== Ships of the class ==
=== China ===
Pennant Number	Name	Namesake	Builder	Laid down	Launched	Commissioned	Fleet	Status
998	昆仑山 / Kunlun Shan	Kunlun Mountains	Hudong-Zhonghua Shipbuilding	2006	21 December 2006	13 November 2007	South Sea Fleet	Active
999	井冈山 / Jinggang Shan	Jinggang Mountains	Hudong-Zhonghua Shipbuilding	2009	16 November 2010	30 October 2011	South Sea Fleet	Active
989	长白山 / Changbai Shan	Changbai Mountains	Hudong-Zhonghua Shipbuilding	2010	26 September 2011	23 September 2012	South Sea Fleet	Active
988	沂蒙山 / Yimeng Shan	Yimeng Mountains	Hudong-Zhonghua Shipbuilding	2014	22 January 2015	1 February 2016	East Sea Fleet	Active
980	龙虎山 / Longhu Shan	Longhu Mountains	Hudong-Zhonghua Shipbuilding	2016	15 June 2017	19 September 2018	East Sea Fleet	Active
987	五指山 / Wuzhi Shan	Wuzhi Mountain	Hudong-Zhonghua Shipbuilding	2017	20 January 2018	12 January 2019	South Sea Fleet	Active
986	四明山/Siming Shan	Siming Mountains	Hudong-Zhonghua Shipbuilding	2017	28 December 2018	2020	East Sea Fleet	Active
985	祁连山/Qilian Shan	Qilian Mountains	Hudong-Zhonghua Shipbuilding	2018	6 June 2019	November 2020	South Sea Fleet	Active

=== Thailand ===
Pennant Number	Name	Namesake	Builder	Laid down	Launched	Commissioned	Fleet	Status
792	HTMS Chang (792)	Ko Chang district	Hudong-Zhonghua Shipbuilding			18 April 2023		Active

== See also ==
- People's Liberation Army Navy Surface Force
- LY-1
