= Assault Craft Unit 5 =

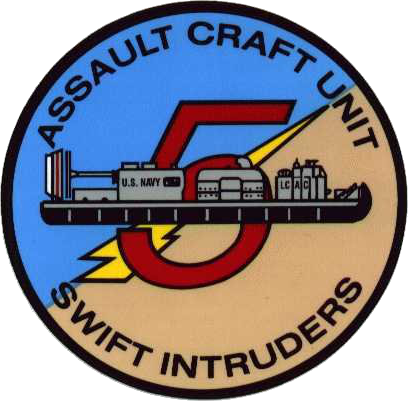
- Active: 1 October 1983 - Present
- Country: United States of America
- Branch: U.S.Navy
- Size: Over 400 personnel
- Part of: Department of the Navy
- Headquarters: Marine Corps Base Camp Pendleton
- Nickname(s): Swift Intruders
- Motto(s): "No beach out of reach"
- Equipment: Landing Craft Air Cushion

Assault Craft Unit 5 (ACU 5) is the United States Navy's Pacific operating unit for the Landing Craft Air Cushion (LCAC). Headquartered at Marine Corps Base Camp Pendleton, California, their mission is transporting, ship-to-shore and across the beach, personnel, weapons, equipment, and cargo of the assault elements of the Marine Air-Ground Task Force. ACU-5 has over 400 sailors, organized in five departments. A part of the United States Pacific Fleet, ACU-5 administratively reports to Commander, Naval Beach Group 1, a part of Expeditionary Strike Group 3.

== Departments ==
=== Operations department ===
The Operations department plans and executes the deployments of the unit's LCACs. Some of the sailors are deployed with amphibious readiness groups (ARG's).

=== Maintenance department ===
The ACU-5 Maintenance department has 5 maintenance groups that are in charge of the repair and upkeep of LCACs.

=== Supply department ===
The Supply department is given an annual budget of 18 million dollars, and is required to catalog warehouses full uniforms, machine parts, and equipment. Most of these warehouses have over 9,000 parts each.

=== Training department ===
The Training Department provides basic and advanced LCAC operational training to all members of ACU-5. Much of ACU-5's LCAC training is conducted by Expeditionary Warfare Training Group Pacific (EWTGPAC).

=== Executive department ===
The Executive department is in charge of any administrative, technical, or medical paperwork involving ACU-5.

== LCAC ==
LCAC or Landing Craft Air Cushion are air cushion vehicles, operated by the U.S. Navy and Japanese Maritime Self Defense Force. The concept design for the modern day LCAC began in the early 1970s. The purpose of the LCACs are to "carry heavy vehicles and cargo" onto beaches at high speeds and over longer distances. The LCACs are currently undergoing a Service Life Extension Program (SLEP), which will be completed on all 72 craft by 2020.

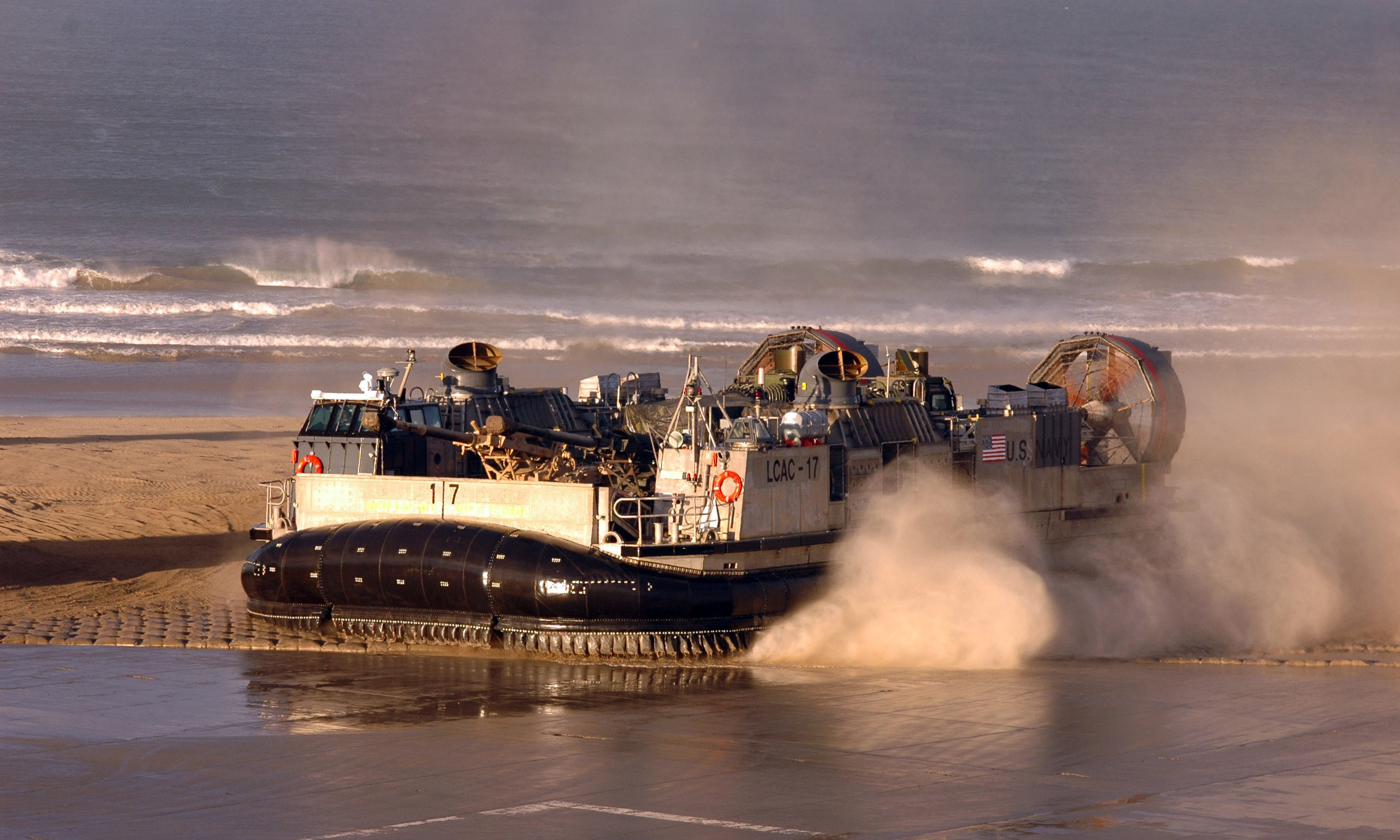
Assault Craft Unit Five (ACU-5), prepares to unload a howitzer artillery gun along the Camp Pendleton coast

== Operations ==
During Operation Desert Storm in 1991, there were eleven LCACs stationed on the Persian Gulf; this was the LCAC's largest deployment. In 1992, ACU-5 deployed 3 LCACs to Japan and created a permanent military presence called detachment Westpac Alfa, which in 2012 became its own command, Naval Beach Unit 7, with 7 LCACS permanently stationed in Sasebo, Japan. ACU-5 conducted landings in Somalia to help with Operation Restore Hope.

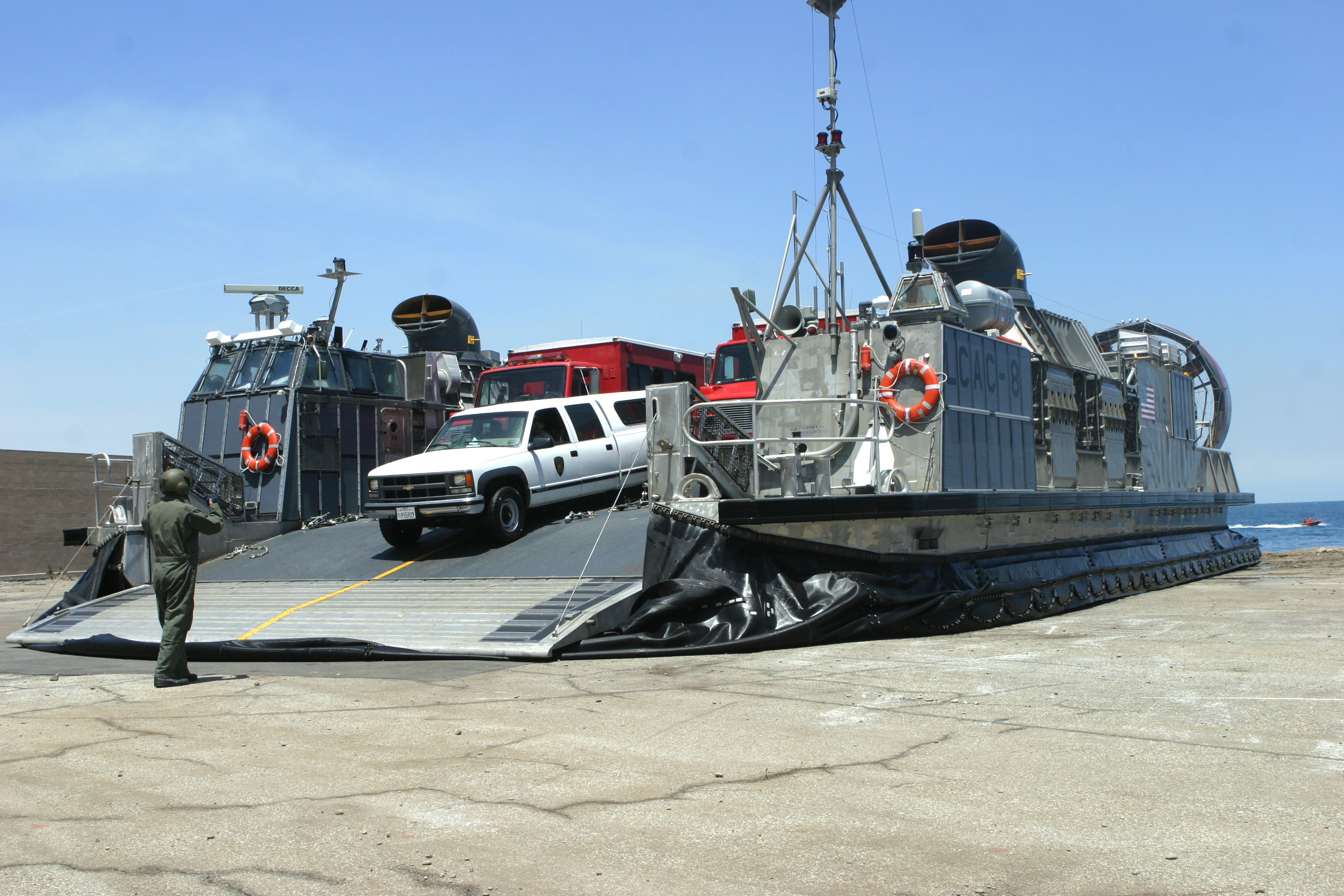
LCAC from ACU 5 delivering firefighting equipment to aid in fighting the 2007 wildfires in Los Angeles County

LCACs have also been used in support of civilian operations. Under an agreement between the Los Angeles County Fire Department and the Navy, ACU 5 uses their LCACs to transport fire-fighting equipment, vehicles, and personnel to Santa Catalina island, to help in combating wildfires. LCACs also provided relief to areas in northern Indonesia affected by the December 2004 tsunami.
