= Lebed-class LCAC =

Class of air-cushioned landing craft

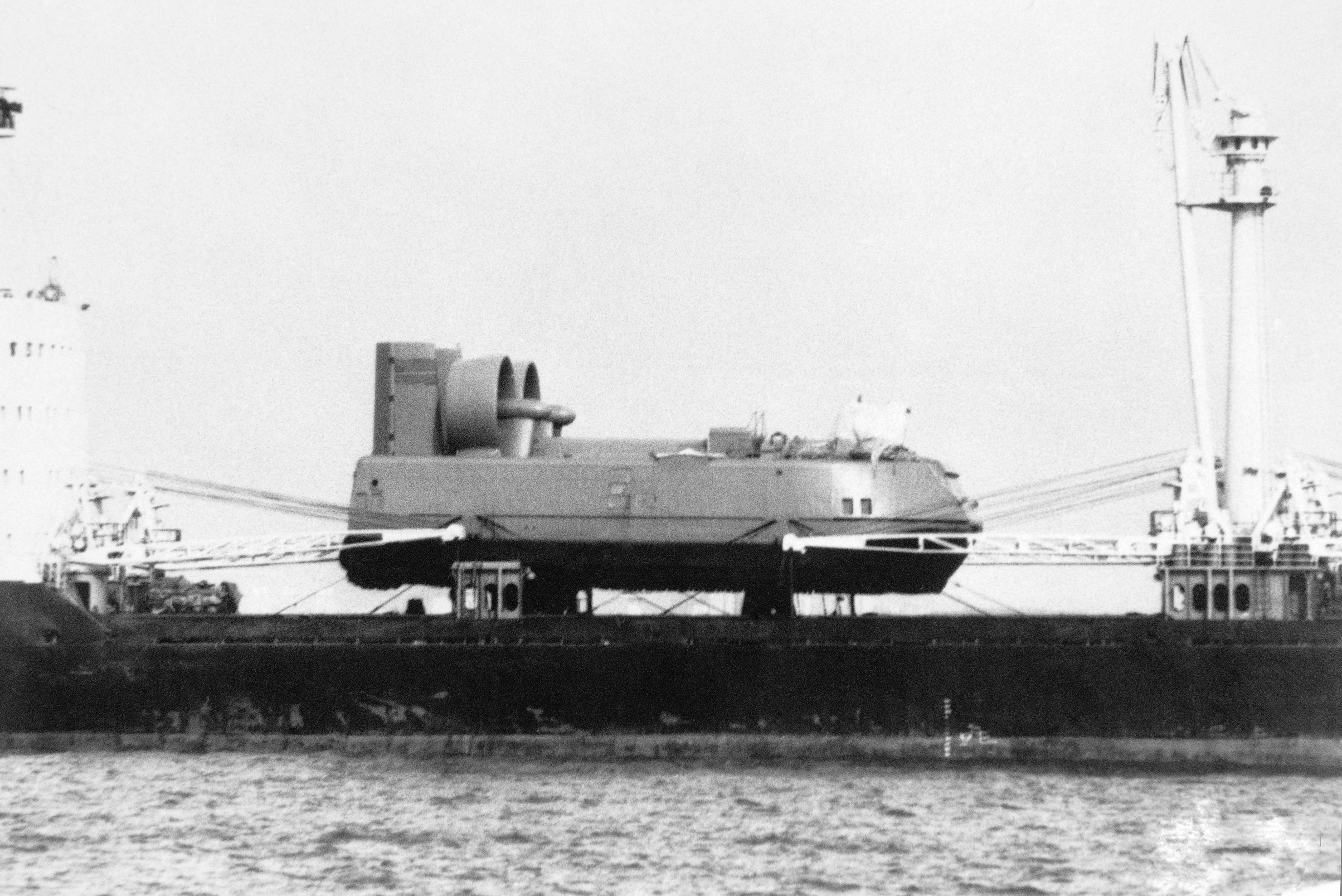
- Lebed class vessel on the deck of a transport ship, 1985

Class overview
- Name: Lebed class LCAC
- Builders: PmSW Almaz, More
- Operators: Soviet Navy; Russian Navy
- Succeeded by: Tsaplya-class LCAC
- Built: 1972–1985
- In commission: 1972-present
- Completed: 20

General characteristics
- Type: Air-cushioned landing craft
- Displacement: 108 long tons (110 t) standard; 114 long tons (116 t) full load
- Length: 24.6 m (80 ft 9 in)
- Beam: 10.8 m (35 ft 5 in)
- Draught: 1.3 m (4 ft 3 in)
- Propulsion: 2 × 10,000 hp (7,457 kW) AL-20K, MT-70 gas turbines
- Speed: 55 knots (102 km/h; 63 mph)
- Range: 100 nmi (190 km; 120 mi) at 50 kn (93 km/h; 58 mph)
- Endurance: 1 day
- Capacity: 1 × T-54 main battle tank or; 2 × PT-76 light tanks or; 2 × BTR-60/70 APCs or; 120 troops or; 37 tons of cargo
- Complement: 6 (2 officers)
- Sensors & processing systems: Kivach-2 navigation radar
- Armament: 1 × twin 12.7 mm "Utes-M" NSV machine gun

The Kalmar class (Project 1206, NATO reporting name Lebed) are a class of medium-sized assault hovercraft designed for the Soviet Navy. The few remaining craft are operated by the Russian Navy.

Designed by the design bureau wing of Almaz shipbuilding company early in the 1970s, production started in 1972 and continued until 1985 in plants at Leningrad and Theodosia.

== Registry ==
- 533
- 639
- 640

== See also ==
- Aist-class LCAC
- Gus-class LCAC
- Tsaplya-class LCAC
- Zubr-class LCAC

== See also ==
- List of ships of the Soviet Navy
- List of ships of Russia by project number
