= Aist-class LCAC =

Soviet assault air-cushioned landing craft

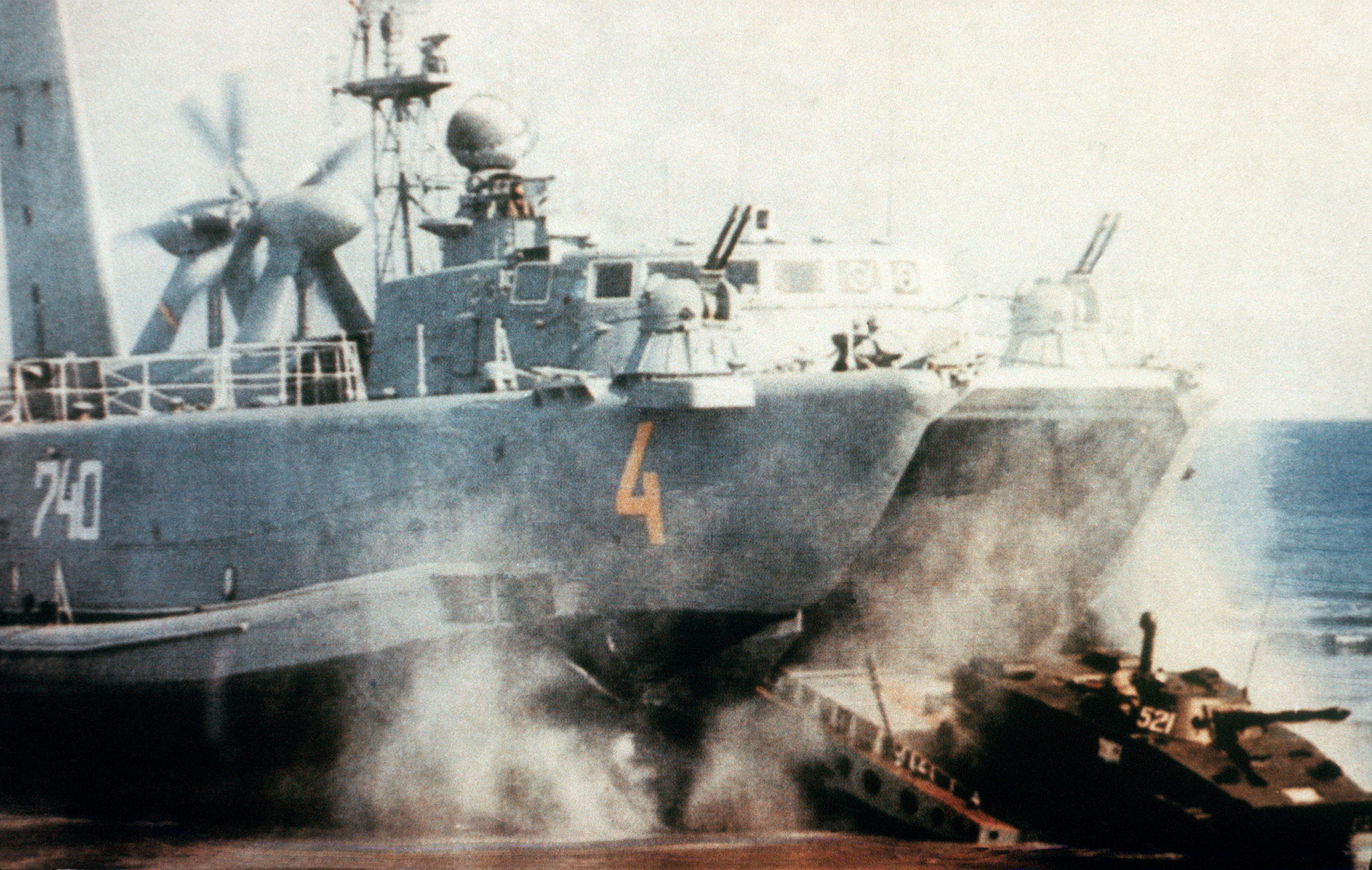
- A PT-76 tank emerges from an Aist-class LCAC

Class overview
- Builders: Almaz Shipbuilding Company
- Operators: Soviet Navy; Russian Navy
- Built: 1975–1985
- In commission: 1975–present
- Completed: 20
- Active: 6

General characteristics
- Type: Air-cushioned landing craft
- Displacement: 298 long tons (303 t) full load
- Length: 47.3 m (155 ft 2 in)
- Beam: 17.8 m (58 ft 5 in)
- Propulsion: 2 × 9,600 hp (7.2 MW) DT-4 Kuznetsov NK-12MV gas turbines driving 4 axial lift fans and 4 propeller units (4 × four-bladed variable-pitch propellers, 2 pusher, 2 tractor)
- Speed: 70 knots (130 km/h; 81 mph)
- Range: 120 nmi (220 km) at 50 kn (93 km/h; 58 mph)
- Capacity: 80 tons; or 4 light tanks and 50 assault troops; or 2 medium tanks and 200 troops; or 3 APCs and 100 troops
- Complement: 15 (3 officers)
- Sensors & processing systems: Kivach I band surface search radar; Drum Tilt H/I-band fire-control radar; High Pole B Square Head IFF
- Armament: 2 × twin AK-230 30 mm; 2 × quadruple SA-N-5 SAM launcher systems (not on all ships); 2 × PK-16 chaff launchers (only on two ships)

Project 12321 Dzheyran (NATO reporting name: Aist class) was the first large assault hovercraft operated by the Soviet Navy. It was designed by the Almaz design bureau wing of the Almaz Shipbuilding Company in 1964–1965. Production of the craft lasted from 1970 until 1985 at Almaz's plant in Leningrad.

== Registry ==
- #609
- #610
- #615
- #700
- MDK 89 (formerly #730)
- MDK 113 (formerly #722)

== See also ==
- List of ships of the Soviet Navy
- List of ships of Russia by project number
