= Type 724 LCAC =

Chinese landing craft

Class overview
- Operators: People's Liberation Army Navy
- In commission: 1994

General characteristics
- Type: LCAC
- Displacement: 6.5 ton
- Length: 12.4 meter
- Beam: 4.7 meter
- Propulsion: 380 kW total
- Speed: 40 kt
- Range: 100 nm
- Complement: 10 troops + crew

The Type 724 Landing Craft Air-Cushion (LCAC) is the first indigenous air cushion landing craft in operational use with People's Liberation Army Navy (PLAN), and its origin dates back to the early 1960s, when 7th Academy was assigned to lead the developmental work on air cushioned vehicles for a 10-year plan lasting from 1963 to 1972. Two projects developed from this research work, and Type 724 LCAC is the direct descendant of these two research projects.

== Songling LCAC ==
One of the two direct predecessors of Type 724 LCAC is the Songling (松陵) LCAC built by Songling (松陵) Machinery Factory in Shenyang. From 1963 to 1967, a total of 3 units were built, Songling # 1, 2 and 3 respectively. Named after the factory where they were built, these LCAC are powered by aircraft piston engines with propellers. Although in Chinese military service, they mainly served as trial units to test out the feasibility of deploying air cushioned vehicles, instead of being used operationally as part of the amphibious forces.

== Type 711 LCAC ==
At the same time Songling LCAC were built, 708th Research Institute in Shanghai also developed another LCAC in parallel. Type 711 is also consisted of three units, numbered 711-1, 711-2 and 711-3 respectively. Type 711 utilizes centralized control which only required a single operator, and it also utilizes variable-pitch propeller. As with Songling LCAC, Type 711 LCAC also mainly served as experimental boats in Chinese navy.

== Type 724 LCAC ==
The relative success of Songling LCAC and Type 711 LCAC encouraged further development and it was decided to utilize the experience gained on both types to develop a new LCAC designated Type 724. However, due to political turmoil in China, namely, Cultural Revolution, program was delayed more than a decade. The requirement of Type 724 was once again proposed after the end of Cultural Revolution, but in the era of reform and opening up, military projects were put on backseats, and the program was once again delayed for another decade. However, the delay also meant that more advanced technologies appeared in those two decades can be adopted to perfect the original designs of Type 711 LCAC and Songling LCAC to produce better result for the proposed Type 724 LCAC. Type 724 LCAC finally entered service in the mid-1990s and more than two dozen were built.

Designed by the Shanghai-based 708 Institute to ferry marine troops from amphibious warfare ships to shore, the Type 724 LCAC is powered by two BF12L913C diesels rated at 380 hp, which provide power to drive the air-cushion blowers and the air propellers located within ring shrouds at the back of the ship giving the craft at a top speed of 40 knots. The Type 724 is unarmed and has a square-shaped hull with three compartments: the soldier compartment in the front, the driving compartment in the middle, and the power compartment in the rear.

About 20 to 30 examples of the Type 724 have been deployed by the PLAN since 1994. The Type 724 LCAC is carried in the docking bay of the Type 072 series landing ships. The Type 724 LCAC can carry up to 10 soldiers to the beach. The air cushion landing craft allows the PLAN greater flexibility in amphibious operations via access to soft sandy beaches, swampland, and loose surfaces where conventional landing craft would have difficulty reaching. The air cushion landing craft also offers greater speed and flexibility over traditional landing craft.
