= Air-cushioned landing craft =

Military hovercraft designed for landing troops and equipment in amphibious operations

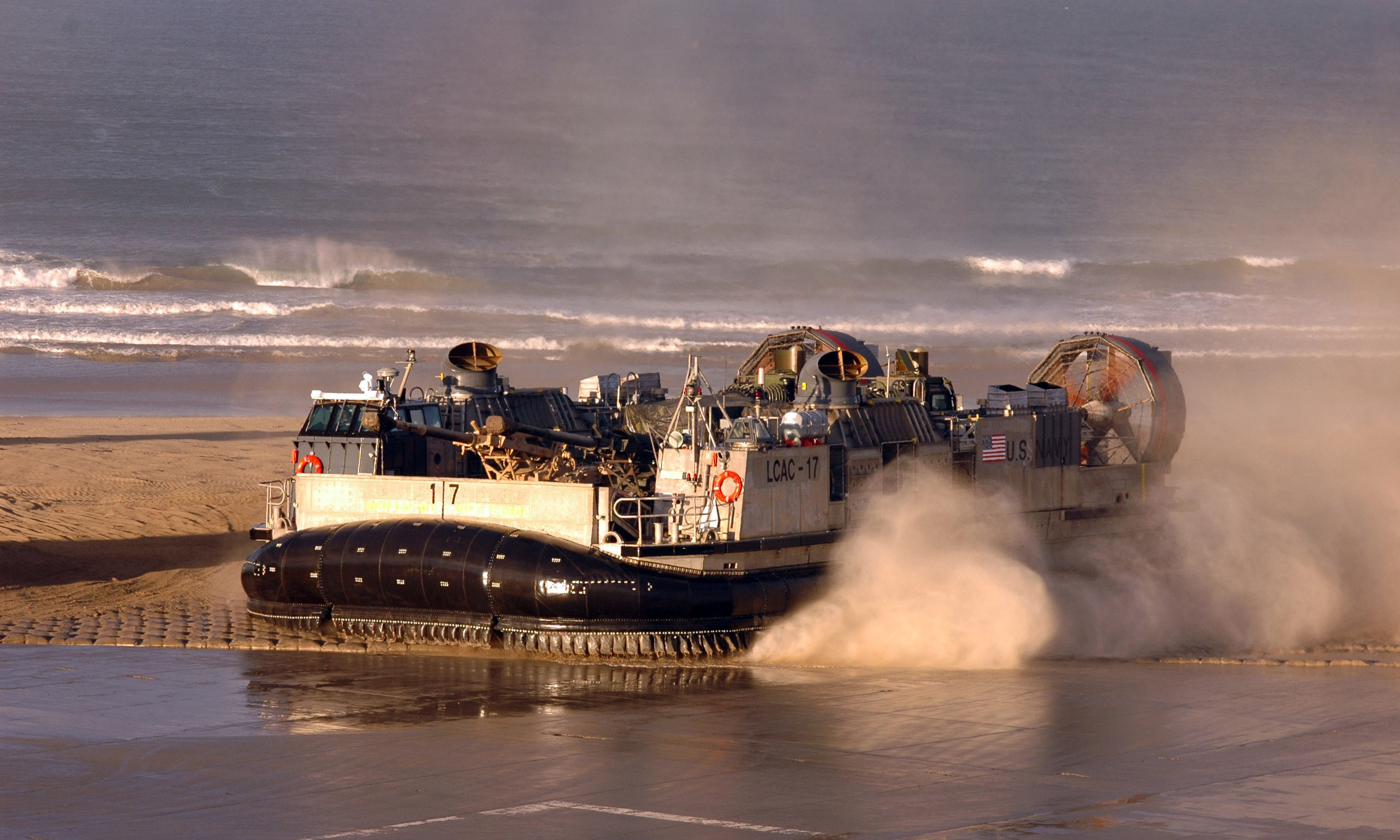
A United States Navy Landing Craft Air Cushion at Camp Pendleton

An air-cushioned landing craft, also called an LCAC (landing craft, air cushioned), is a modern variation on the amphibious landing boat. The majority of these craft are small- to mid-sized multi-purpose hovercraft, also known as "over the beach" ("OTB") craft. This allows troops and materiel to access more than 70 percent of the world's coastline, while only approximately 15 percent of that coastline is available to conventional boat-type landing craft. Typical barriers to conventional landing craft are soft sandy beaches, marshes, swampland, and loose surfaces. Air cushion technology has vastly increased the landing capability of the craft, providing greater speed and flexibility over traditional landing craft.

Like the mechanized landing craft, they are usually equipped with mounted machine guns; they also support grenade launchers and heavy weapons.

== Types ==
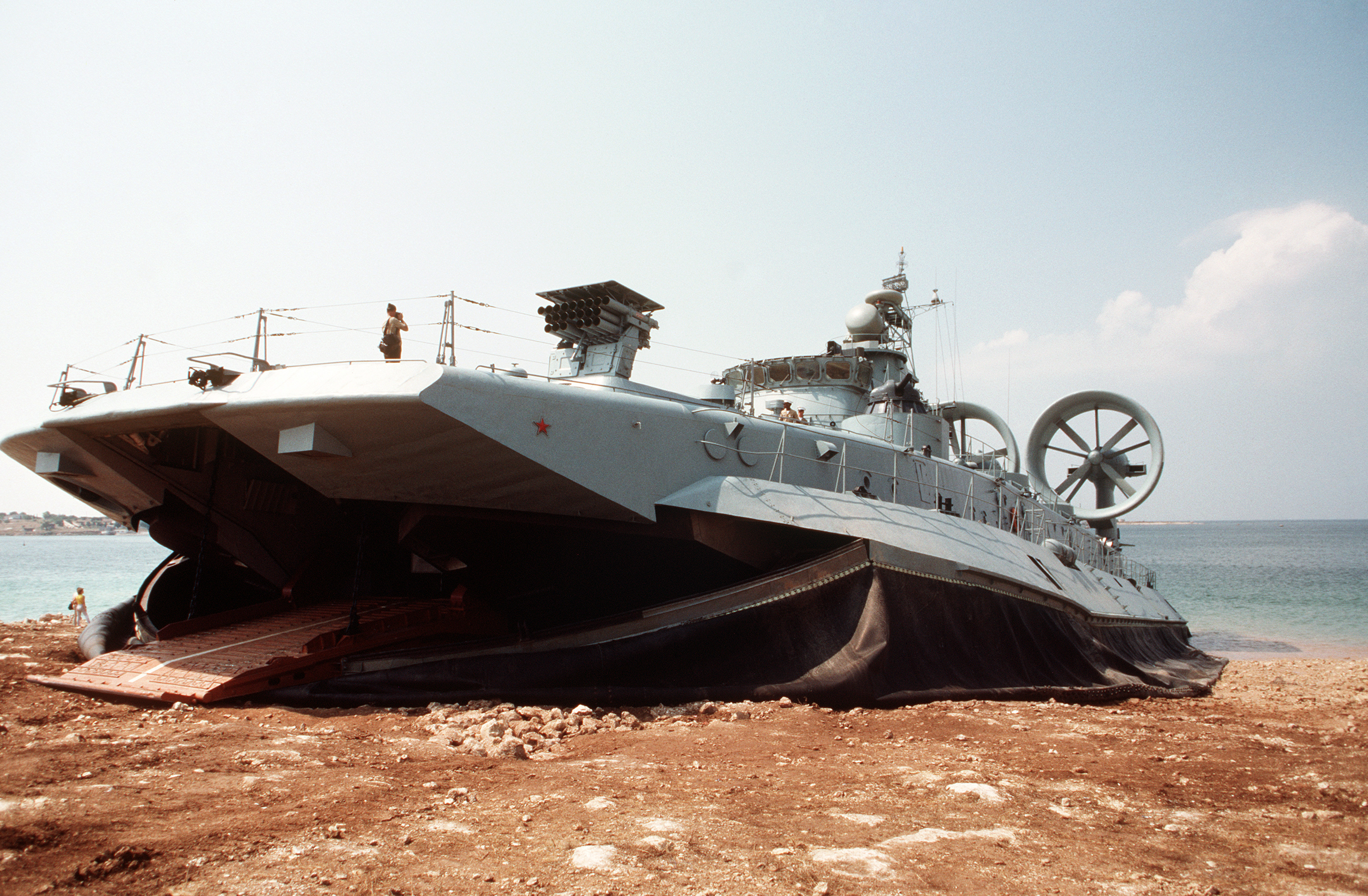
Zubr-class LCAC

- Zubr-class LCAC
- Aist-class LCAC (Soviet tank-carrying hovercraft)
- Griffon Hoverwork 8000TD
- Gus-class LCAC
- Jinsha II-class LCAC
- Landing Craft Air Cushion (LCAC)
- LCAC(L)
- Ship-to-Shore Connector (LCAC-100 class)
- Tsaplya-class LCAC
- Type 724 LCAC
- Type 726 LCAC
- Solgae 631-class LCAC

== See also ==
- Engin de débarquement amphibie rapide
