= Solgae 631-class LCAC =

Air-cushioned landing craft

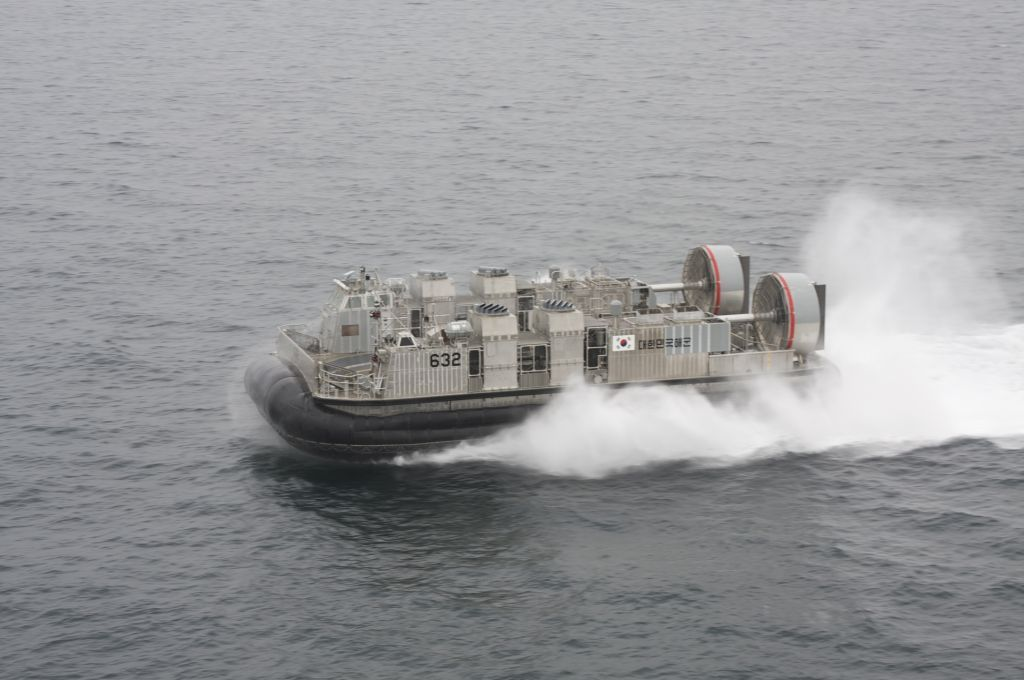
- ROKS Solgae 632

Class overview
- Name: Solgae 631 class
- Builders: HJ Shipbuilding & Construction
- Operators: Republic of Korea Navy
- In commission: 2007–present
- Planned: 8
- Building: 6
- Completed: 4
- Active: 4

General characteristics
- Type: Air-cushioned landing craft
- Displacement: 100 t (98 long tons; 110 short tons) (empty), 155 t (153 long tons; 171 short tons) (full load)
- Length: 27.9 m (91 ft 6 in)
- Beam: 14.6 m (47 ft 11 in)
- Propulsion: 2 × Vericor ETF40B gas turbines
- Speed: 40 knots (74 km/h; 46 mph)
- Range: 185 km (115 mi) at 40 knots (74 km/h; 46 mph)
- Capacity: Up to 55 t (54 long tons; 61 short tons)
- Complement: 24 crew; 1 main battle tank
- Armament: 2 × K6 12.7 mm machine guns

The Solgae 631-class LCAC (Hangul: 솔개 631급, Hanja: 솔개631級), often called Solgae class (Hangul: 솔개급 고속상륙정, Hanja: 솔개級高速上陸艇) after the name of lead ship, is an air-cushioned landing craft (LCAC) designed for the Republic of Korea Navy. Built by Hanjin Heavy Industries, they're designed to operate from the ROKS Dokdo and the future Dokdo-class amphibious assault ships. This project was known as the LSF-II or Landing Ship Fast-II during development.

== Design ==
The craft can carry a maximum load of 55 tons, land on hostile beaches doing 40 knots and it can climb at up to 6 degrees. They have 12.7 mm machine guns for self defense. The crew cockpit carries three crew and a landing-force commander. The LCAC can carry, in addition to troops, a main battle tank or two amphibious assault vehicles. So far four of these units have been delivered, and more are likely to be ordered. It has been offered for export to foreign navies.
