= Tsaplya-class LCAC =

Ship class

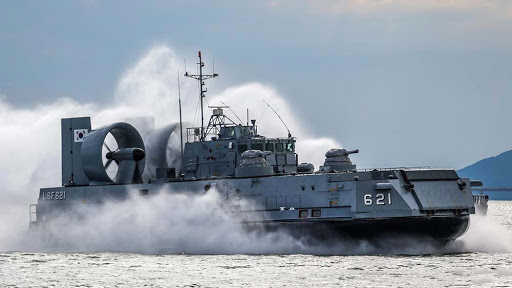
- A Tsaplya-class LCAC in South Korean service.

Class overview
- Name: Tsaplya class
- Builders: Almaz, Khabarovsk Shipyard, Amur, More, etc.
- Operators: Russian Navy (pending); Republic of Korea Navy (3 in service)
- Built: 1982–1991
- In commission: 1982–present
- Planned: 5–12
- Completed: 10

General characteristics
- Type: Air-cushioned landing craft
- Displacement: 149 long tons (151 t) full load
- Length: 31.6 m (103 ft 8 in)
- Beam: 14.8 m (48 ft 7 in)
- Propulsion: 2 × 4,000 hp (3,000 kW) PR-77 gas turbines or M70FRU, E80D7 M85 M70FRU2; 2 lift fans, 2 propulsion fans; 2 four-bladed variable-pitch propellers
- Speed: 50 knots (93 km/h; 58 mph)
- Range: 100 nmi (190 km; 120 mi) at 50 kn (93 km/h; 58 mph)
- Capacity: Up to 45 tons : 1 main battle tank plus 80 troops or 25 tons plus 160 troops
- Complement: 14 (4 officers)
- Sensors & processing systems: Curl Stone; I-band
- Armament: 2 × AK-230 or AK-306 30 mm AA; 1 × SA-N-5/8 SAM position; 2 × 12.7 mm machine guns; 2 × 40 mm grenade launchers

The Tsaplya-class LCAC (Project 1206.1 Murena) is a medium size assault hovercraft operated by the Russian Navy.

== History ==
The Tsaplya class is an improved and longer version of the Lebed class, intended to replace the Gus class in service, being carried by the Ivan Rogov-class landing ship. The Tsaplya class is equipped with a bow loading ramp, a gun being mounted to starboard of the ramp and the ship's bridge to port; it can carry a PT-76 amphibious tank.

The first of the class was constructed at Feodosiya, entering service in 1982; ten ships of the class were in service by the early 1990s. They were operated by the Maritime Border Guards with the Amur/Ussuri River Flotilla; following the fall of the Soviet Union they were quickly withdrawn from service, none being operational by 1995.

In 2003 the Republic of Korea Navy ordered three vessels from Russia. According to a source from the Russian delegation at the IndoDefence 2014 exhibition, the ROK Navy was interested in purchasing several more upgraded Murena-E vessels and in the repair of its current trio of vessels.

On 10 January 2023, it was reported that the Khabarovsk shipbuilding plant is planning to resume construction of a modernised version of the Tsaplya class in 2023.

== See also ==
- List of ships of the Soviet Navy
- List of ships of Russia by project number
