= Zubr-class LCAC =

Class of air-cushioned landing craft of Soviet design

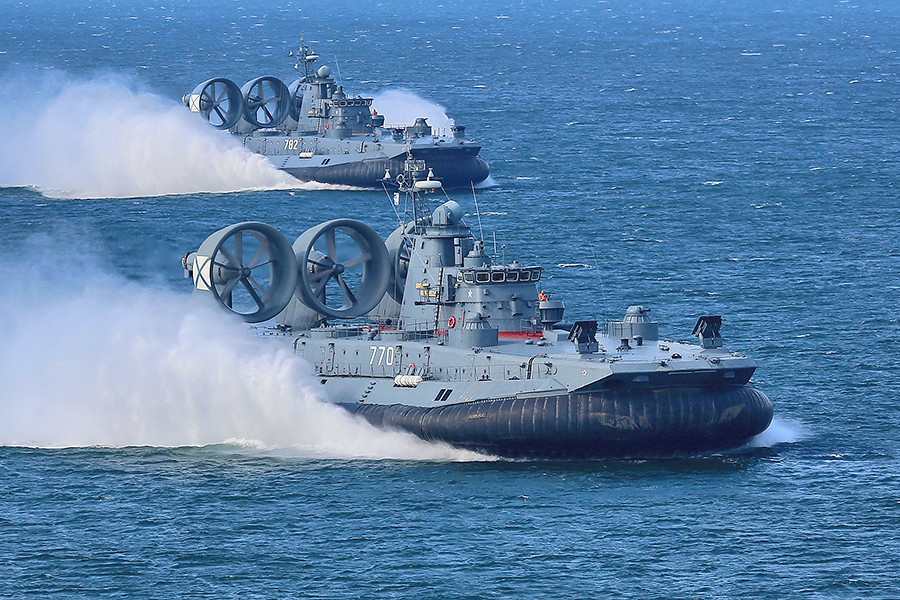
- Mordoviya and Evgeniy Kocheshkov

Class overview
- Builders: PO More in Feodosiya of Crimea, Khabarovsk shipyard, Almaz, Pribaltisk Yantar
- Operators: Soviet Navy; Russian Navy; Hellenic Navy; People's Liberation Army Navy
- In commission: 1986–present
- Planned: 17
- Building: 2
- Completed: 15
- Canceled: 2
- Active: 10
- Scrapped: 5

General characteristics
- Type: Air-cushioned landing craft
- Displacement: 340 tons (light); 415 tons (normal); 555 tons (full load)
- Length: 57 m (187 ft)
- Beam: 25.6 m (84 ft)
- Draught: 1.6 m (5.2 ft)
- Propulsion: 3 x 10,000 horsepower (7,500 kW) propelling M35-1 gas turbine units or M70FRU2&2R 2 x 10,000 hp supercharging M35-2 gas turbine units or M85RU/FR E80D7 M70FRU\2 4 x NO10 superchargers; Propellers: 3 four-bladed variable-pitch propellers
- Speed: 63 knots (117 km/h; 72 mph); 55 knots (102 km/h; 63 mph) sustainable
- Range: 300 nmi (560 km) at 55 knots
- Complement: 31 (4 officers, 27 enlisted)
- Sensors & processing systems: Ekran-1 navigational radar, Lazur radar (Pozitiv radar on MDK-51), R-782 Buran communications system
- Electronic warfare & decoys: Electronic Countermeasures System: Decoys, MS-227 chaff launcher, MP-411 ESM radar system; intercept
- Armament: 4 × Strela-3 man-portable air defence missile system launchers, plus 32 anti-personnel missiles; or 2 x Strela 2 quad launchers, manual aiming, infrared homing to 6 km (3.7 mi) at Mach 1.5, maximum altitude of 2,500 m (8,200 ft); 2 × 30 mm AK-630 close in weapon systems with 6,000 rounds each, maximum range of 2 km (1.2 mi); 2 × 140 mm Ogon launchers, 22 rockets each with 132 rockets in total; or 2 x 122 mm retractable rocket launchers; Mines (one set of removable equipment for laying from 20 to 80 mines, depending on their types)

The Zubr class, Soviet designation Project 1232.2, (NATO reporting name "Pomornik") is a class of Soviet-designed air-cushioned landing craft (LCAC). The name "Zubr" is Russian for the European bison. This class of military hovercraft is, as of 2026 the world's largest hovercraft, with a standard full load displacement of 555 tons. The hovercraft was designed to sealift amphibious assault units (such as marines and tanks) from equipped/non-equipped vessels to non-equipped shores, as well as to transport and plant naval mines.

Ten Zubr-class hovercraft remain in service. There are two vessels in the Russian Navy and four with the Hellenic Navy. In 2009 China placed an order for four vessels from Ukraine as part of a deal worth US$315 million. Two updated versions of the vessels were built by Crimea's Feodosia Shipbuilding Company, followed by two advanced models of the surface warship. In 2023, an additional two more were built and modernized, with both hulls being numbered as 3260 and 3261.

The purchase in 2000 of HS Cephalonia (L 180) for the Hellenic Navy marked the first time a Soviet-designed naval craft had been built for a NATO member.

In June 2017 Russia announced the restarting of production of Zubr-class craft. Representatives from the Russian shipbuilding industry soon after responded by stating production could not possibly resume in 2018 and would only be possible by 2019–2021, refuting the government position. Representatives cited the lack of availability of and inability to mass-produce components, notably gas-turbine engines and reduction gears as the main obstacles.

NPO Saturn (ODK GT) and Turboros developed marine gas turbine engines M70FRU (D090), FR RU, M70FRU2 (DP/DM71) along M90FR, M75RU, E70RD8 and Elektrosila, AO Zvezda, Metallist, Samara and others developed redactors and gears.

== History ==
The Zubr class landing craft were developed in the 1980s and the first operational group entered service in 1986. From 1985 to 1993 and 2001 and 2004, a total of 15 units of the class were laid down in Saint Petersburg and Feodosia. After the end of the Soviet Union, two boats at the shipyard were scrapped before they were completed, and three boats from the Black Sea Fleet were handed over to Ukraine, which itself built another boat. Ukraine retired all of their boats by 2008. As of 2001, three new boats were built for Greece.

== Configuration ==
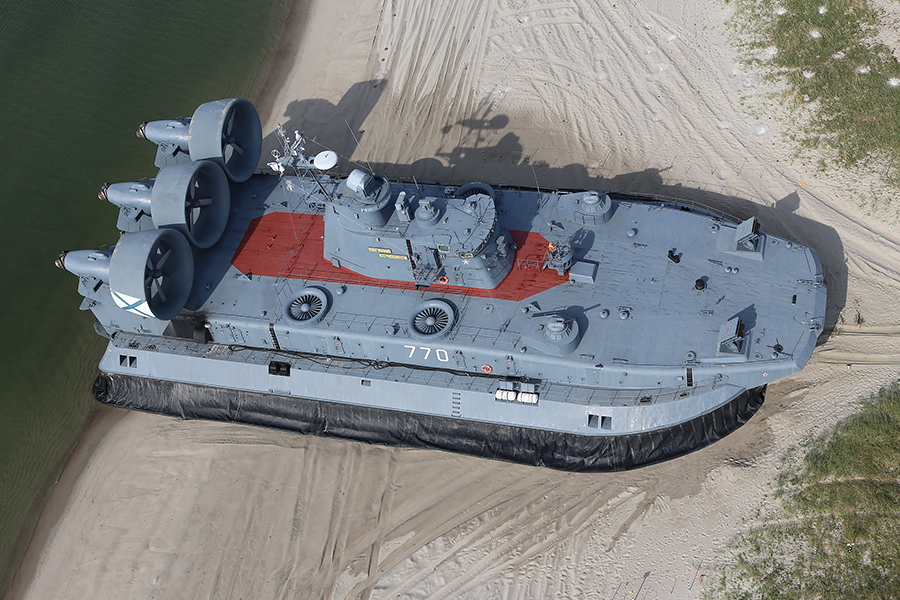
Top view

High strength and buoyancy is provided by a rectangular pontoon, the main load-carrying part of the ship's hull. The superstructure built on the pontoon is divided into three compartments with two longitudinal bulkheads: combat material compartment in the midsection fitted with tank ramps, and outboard sections housing main and auxiliary propulsion units, troop compartments, living quarters, and NBC protection systems. To improve working conditions in the battle stations, troop compartments and living quarters are fitted with air-conditioning and heating-systems, sound/heat-insulating coatings, and structures made of vibration damping materials. The ship provides normal conditions for the crew to make meals and rest.

Personnel are protected against the effects of weapons of mass destruction by airtight sealing of combat stations, crew and troop compartments, augmented with individual gas masks and protection suits. The ship is also protected from magnetic influence mines with an active system to compensate for the magnetic fields generated by the ship and transported materials. The central command post and MS-227 device compartments are strengthened with alloy armor.

== Capacity ==
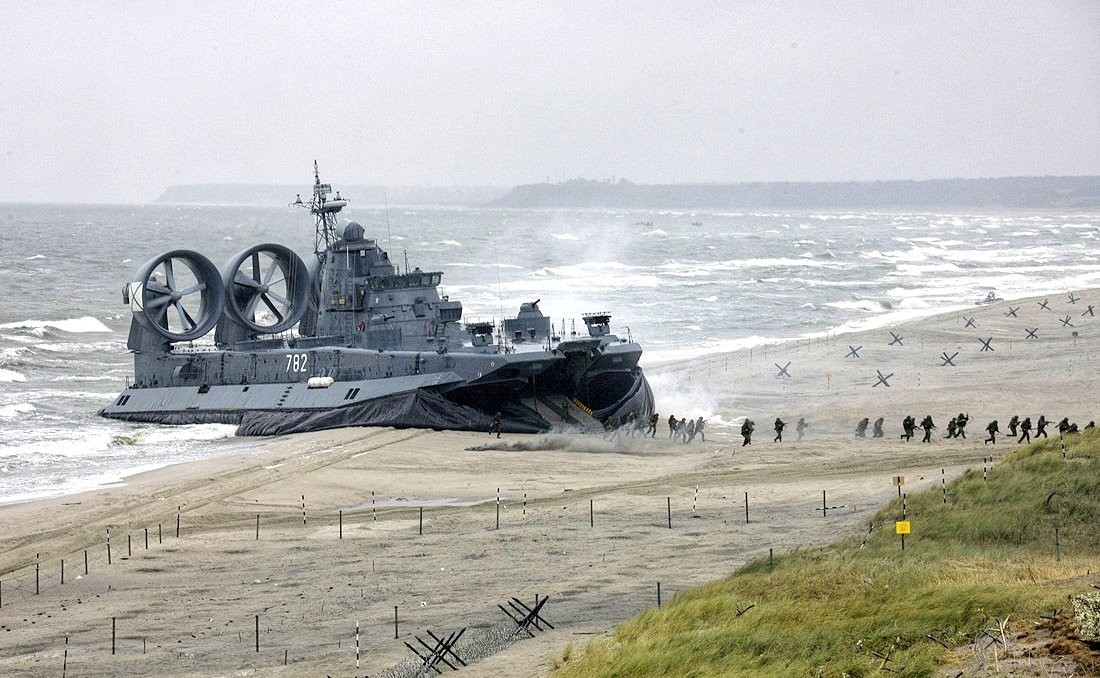
Mordovia, a Russian Navy Zubr class, during Exercise Zapad-09

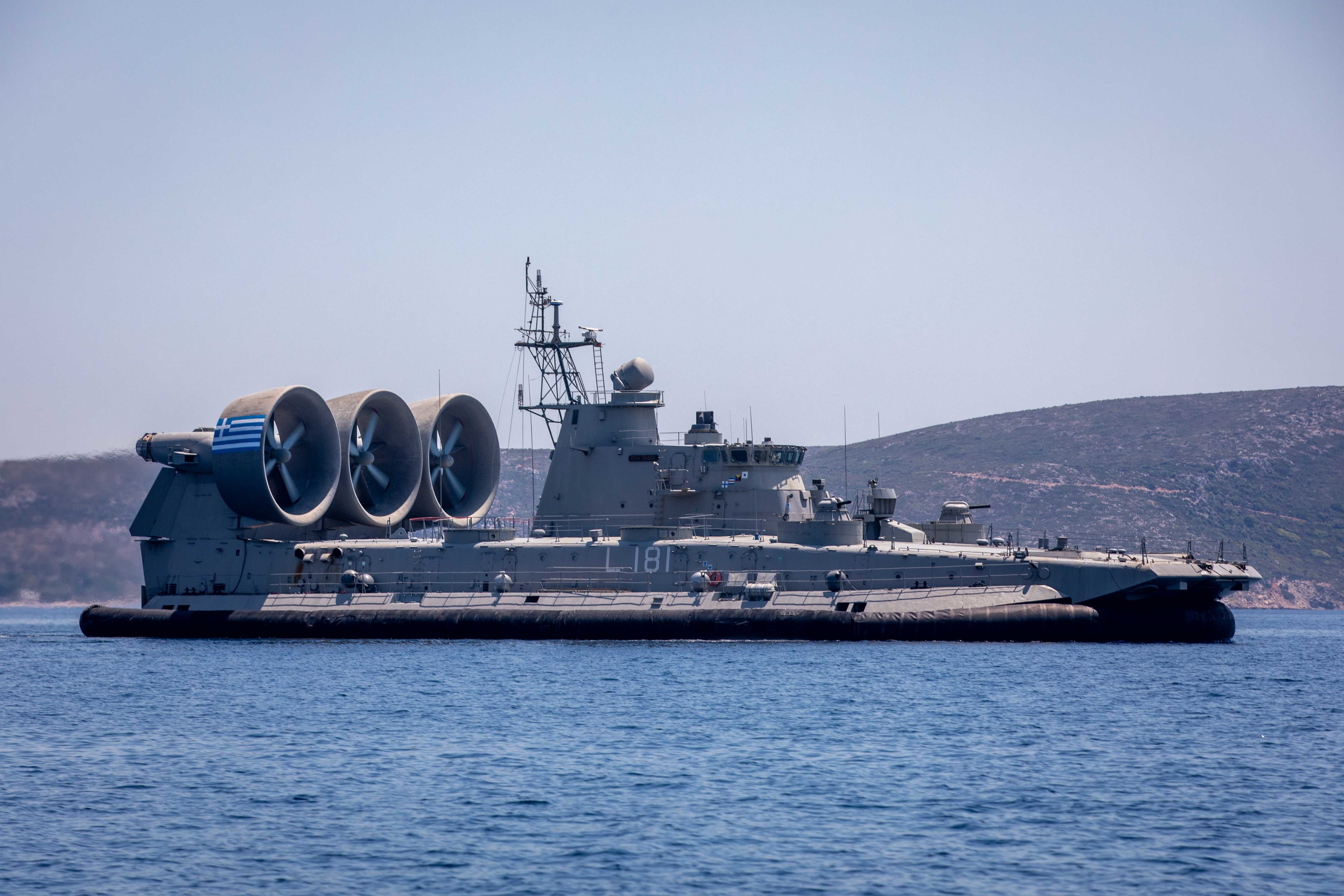
HS Ithaca (L 181) of the Hellenic Navy in 2022

The Zubr-class landing craft has a cargo area of 400 square metres (4,300 ft^{2}) and a fuel capacity of 56 tons. It can carry three main battle tanks (up to 150 tonnes), or ten armoured vehicles with 230 troops (up to 131 tonnes), or eight armoured personnel carriers of total mass up to 115 tonnes, or eight amphibious tanks or up to 500 troops (with 360 troops in the cargo compartment).

At full displacement the ship is capable of negotiating up to 5-degree gradients on non-equipped shores and 1.6 m (5 ft 3 in)-high vertical walls. The Zubr class remains seaworthy in conditions up to Sea State 4. The vessel has a cruising speed of 30–40 knots (56–74 km/h; 35–46 mph).

Later models built by Ukroboronprom for the People's Republic of China are reported to travel at a top speed of 63 kt. The range of 300 nautical miles is obtained at 55 kt cruise. A licensed-built version of this model is in service with the Chinese People's Liberation Army Navy designated as the Type 958.

== Operators ==
Russian Navy (ex-Soviet Navy) (2)

- Baltic Fleet
  - 770 Evgeniy Kocheshkov (former MDK-50)
  - 782 Mordovia (former MDK-94)

Hellenic Navy (2 + 2)

- HS Kefallinia (Decommissioned in March 2025) (L 180, former MDK-118)
- HS Ithaki (L 181, former U421)
- HS Kerkira (L 182)
- HS Zakynthos (L 183)

People's Liberation Army Navy

- 6 (2 delivered from Ukraine, 4 built in China)

=== Former operators ===
Ukrainian Navy (4)

- Donetsk (U420, former MDK-100) — decommissioned on 11 June 1999, scrapped
- Kramatorsk (U422, former MDK-57) — decommissioned on 11 June 1999, scrapped
- Horlivka (U423, former MDK-93) — sold to Greece on 24 January 2000, was to be Kerkira (L182), but not accepted into service
- Artemivsk (U424, former MDK-123) — decommissioned

== Popular Culture ==
A Zubr-class hovercraft is the only extraction point on the Terminal map in Escape from Tarkov. In the game, the player character spends the final moments of the campaign on this hovercraft. The Zubr is featured in all four possible game endings.

== See also ==
- List of ships of the Soviet Navy
- List of ships of Russia by project number
