= Ramsgate Hoverport =

Ramsgate International Hoverport
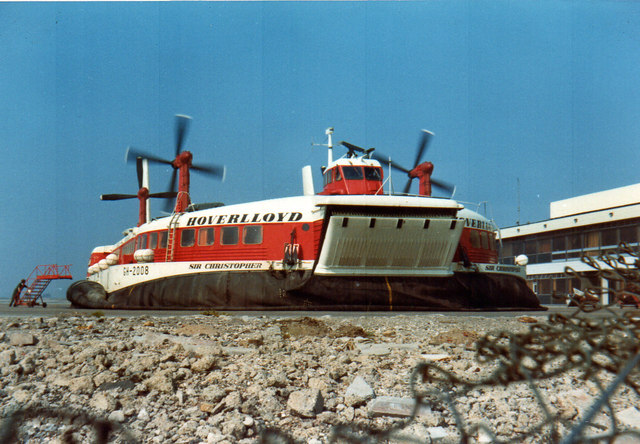
- The SR.N4 hovercraft Sir Christopher on the landing pad at Ramsgate Hoverport
- Interactive map of Ramsgate International Hoverport

Location
- Country: United Kingdom
- Location: Cliffsend, Kent
- Coordinates: 51.32742°N 1.37244°E

Details
- Opened: 1969
- Closed: To passengers 1982; Site closure 1987
- Owned by: Hoverlloyd
- Type of Harbor: Hoverport
- Size: 11.5 acres (0.047 km^{2})

Ramsgate International Hoverport was the world's first purpose-built hoverport constructed on the coast at the village of Cliffsend, around 2 miles (3.2 km) from Ramsgate, with direct access to Pegwell Bay. The hoverport was purpose built in 1969 by hovercraft operator Hoverlloyd to serve the English Channel crossing market using SR.N4 hovercraft. It operated passenger services until 1982 following a merger with rival Seaspeed to form the combined Hoverspeed, and operated exclusively from Seaspeed's Dover hoverport. The site remained in use for administration and engineering until December 1987.

== Construction ==
The Hoverlloyd company was formed in 1965 to take advantage of the new form of transport of hovercraft, with the intention of starting a cross-channel service to compete against the ferry services. The company initially started operating smaller SR.N6 craft from a pad within Ramsgate Harbour whilst looking for a longer term base for larger craft. Having discounted other options along the Kent coast, they settled on Pegwell Bay, which was sheltered from weather conditions by the Goodwin Sands.

The building of the hoverport was controversial, with objections from a range of interest parties including local residents represented by the "Pegwell Bay Committee", bird watchers, those wishing to conserve the coastline, and yacht operators. The Kent Trust for Nature Conservation raised money to purchase 100 acres of land in order to block the construction. Multiple rounds of public inquiry were held, before the inspector Charles Hilton recommended granting of permission, with the ministerial approval being given on 10 January 1968. A second inquiry was then held in September 1967, again by Hilton, following the announcement of British Rail building a hoverport for their Seaspeed service at the Port of Dover. It was agreed that both Dover and Ramsgate should have hoverports, as they were offering different types of service.

The construction was completed by Cementation, who started construction in July 1968. The build required the tipping of 300,000 long tons (670,000,000 lb) of colliery spoil to form the base.

The purpose-built hoverport opened on 2 May 1969 with the delivery of the company's first two large SR.N4 craft, Swift and Sure, which started operations on the route to Calais. The port cost £1.5 million, and the formal opening was performed by Prince Philip, Duke of Edinburgh.

== Operations ==
The site continued to operate through the 1970s, eventually operating four craft, including the first SR.N4 Mark II, the Prince of Wales (GH-2054) which started operations from Ramsgate on 18 June 1977.

In 1979, following cost pressure caused by the 1970s oil crises, Hoverlloyd was listed for sale as a condition of the bailout of then-parent company Broström Shipping Group.

In 1981, the operator merged with British Rail-owned Seaspeed to form Hoverspeed. Thanet Member of Parliament William Rees-Davies went on the record to the Thanet Chambers of Commerce that any merger would not threaten operations at Ramsgate.

== Closure ==
In October 1982, all passenger and vehicle services were moved to Seaspeed's operating base at the Port of Dover.

The hoverport remained as an operational and maintenance base, with administration taking place on site until October 1985, and engineering (particularly hovercraft overhauls) continuing until December 1987.

== Later use ==
In 1993, a go-kart circuit was laid out on the site. Tracks covered the North-east end of the site, incorporating parts of the former maintenance building.

The site was also used as satellite lorry parking and storage site for ferry operations from Port Ramsgate by Sally and Oostende Lines. Both uses finished in 1995.

=== Proposed holiday resort ===
In the 1990s, construction was proposed of a holiday resort to be part-funded with European Union development grants and developed by businessman Jimmy Godden. In preparation, the buildings on the site were demolished in August 1995. Initial permission was granted by then-Environment Secretary John Gummer; negotiations with Thanet District Council broke down in 1996.

As of 2006, despite the site's disuse, the hovercraft pad, car-marshalling area, and approach road are still identifiable at the site.
