= Seaspeed =

British hovercraft operator

- Industry: Passenger transportation
- Founded: 1965
- Defunct: 1981
- Fate: Merged with Hoverlloyd 1981
- Successor: Hoverspeed
- Headquarters: Dover, Portsmouth, United Kingdom
- Area served: English Channel, Solent
- Key people: John Lefeaux, Managing Director
- Number of employees: 475 (Permanent); 225 (Seasonal); 1980
- Parent: British Rail

Seaspeed was a British hovercraft operator which ran services in the Solent and English Channel between 1965 and 1981, when it merged with a rival to form Hoverspeed.

Seaspeed was a jointly owned subsidiary of railway companies British Rail (under British Rail Hovercraft Limited) and France's SNCF, and was established in 1965. Seaspeed operated several services; its first route, running between Cowes and Southampton, was launched on 6 July 1966. Initially operating a fleet of SR.N6s for these short-distance services, it opted to procure larger SR.N4s for its cross-Channel ferry service; the first of these hoverferries was introduced in 1968. On this route, Seaspeed competed against traditional ferries and rival SR.N4 operator Hoverlloyd.

In 1976, after concluding that it could not attain suitable profitability from its smaller SR.N6 services, Seaspeed sold these to rival hovercraft company Hovertravel. Focusing upon its cross-Channel service, it opted to repeatedly upgrade the SR.N4 fleet. During the late 1970s, Seaspeed introduced the stretched SR.N4 Mk.III, greatly increasing its capacity; it also introduced a single French-built SEDAM N500 hovercraft, although the latter's performance was found lacking and it was returned to SNCF after a few years.

In 1981, in response to intensifying competition and rising costs, Seaspeed merged with its historic rival Hoverlloyd to create the combined Hoverspeed. This new entity continued to operate the SR.N4 fleet until finally withdrawing hovercraft services in 2000.

== Background and formation ==
During the late 1950s and early 1960s, British inventor Sir Christopher Cockerell had, in cooperation with British aerospace manufacturer Saunders-Roe, developed a pioneering new form of transportation, embodied in the form of the experimental SR.N1 vehicle, which became widely known as the hovercraft. British manufacturer Saunders-Roe proceeded with work on various hovercraft designs, successfully developing multiple commercially-viable vehicles in the mid-1960s. These included the SR.N4, a large cross-Channel ferry capable of seating up to 418 passengers along with 60 cars, and the SR.N5, the first commercially-active hovercraft.

Various operators became interested in operating hovercraft across various routes, including the highly-trafficked ones across the English Channel between the UK and France. Nationalised railway operator British Rail, which already had its Sealink ferry company as a subsidiary, was one such company; its interest was likely to have been heavily influenced by a political decision by the Ministry of Technology to establish a publicly owned hovercraft operator, in addition to strong interest from other commercial operators.

During 1965, it entered into discussions with potential partners, including the British Overseas Airways Corporation and British European Airways. Having approached French railway operator SNCF, the two train companies decided to jointly establish a new venture to enter the market with. Accordingly, in 1965, British Rail Hovercraft Limited was established; although it would be another three years before it launched its cross-Channel service.

One of the first decisions taken by Seaspeed's management, announced in November 1965, was its commitment for the Saunders-Roe SR.N4. The company agreed to acquire the first example, which was essentially a prototype, and thus would serve as the type's launch customer. According to authors Robin Paine and Roger Syms, the selection of the SR.N4 had been a foregone conclusion and the predominant reason for the company's formation was to operate such a vehicle.

== Cross-Channel services ==
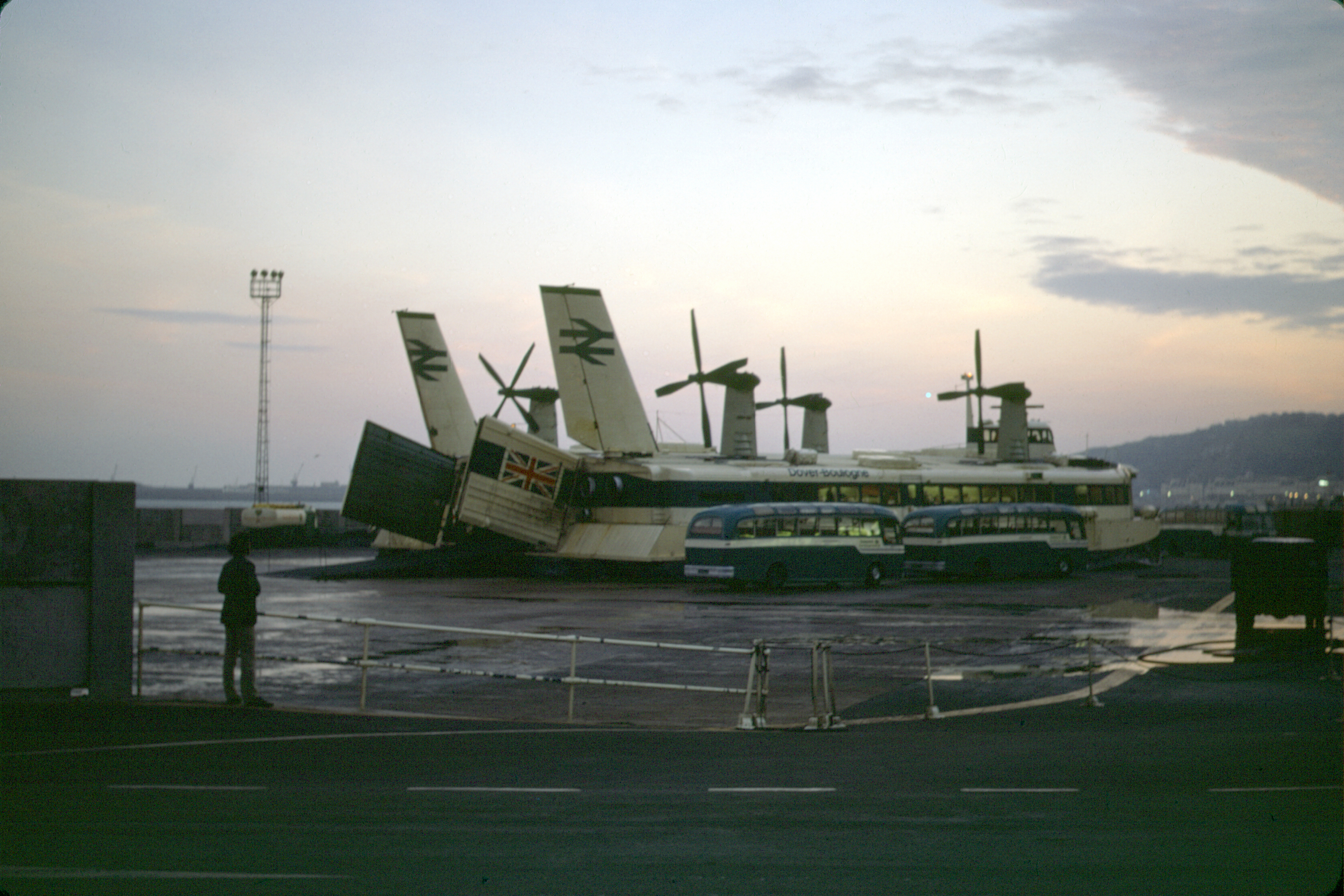
A Seaspeed SR.N4 loading at the Hoverport, Dover Eastern Docks, September 1970

=== Dover to Boulogne and Calais routes ===
Seaspeed investigated various options for its intended services, intensifying its evaluation efforts in 1967. Dover, Folkestone and Pegwell Bay were considered as well as Lydd-on-Sea, Brighton, Le Touquet and the Isle of Man. However, management was keen to align with existing Sealink services (also owned by British Rail) so that, in the event of a vessel's failure (or bad weather conditions), it could be more readily substituted for.

Thus, either Dover or Folkestone on the English side and Calais or Boulogne-sur-Mer on the French side became the preferred options. Folkestone was eliminated due to its small harbour, unable to cater for large hovercraft, and high exposure to southerly winds. SNCF, being keen to support the initiative, offered to build a railway line and station adjacent to the proposed Boulogne hoverport at its own expense.

In August 1968, Seaspeed commenced its cross-Channel services from the Eastern Docks at Dover, England to Boulogne-sur-Mer, France using its first SR.N4 The Princess Margaret. In 1970, Dover to Calais was added with The Princess Anne respectively.

Seaspeed also operated a single French-built SEDAM N500 hovercraft, designated N500-02, Ingénieur Jean Bertin, from summer 1977. In concept, it looked to be a capable vehicle, possessing advantages over the SR.N4 such as storing cars over two decks rather than one. Despite this, the N500 was beset by design and operational problems that would never be successfully resolved; following a somewhat sporadic service on the cross-Channel route, the N500 was permanently withdrawn during 1983 and later scrapped.

=== Competition with Hoverlloyd ===
Seaspeed was not the only hovercraft operator that decided to move on the cross-Channel market at the time; a rival company, Hoverlloyd, was also established in the 1960s and launched its own competing route between Calais and Ramsgate. The two firms would compete with one another, as well as incumbent ferry operators, for market share throughout Seaspeed's existence. Despite this rivalry, considerations were made towards mutually beneficial cooperation; at an early stage, Seaspeed's management considered conducting SR.N5 services out of Hoverlloyd's hoverport at Ramsgate.

==== Increased reliability but poor profitability ====
The cancellation rate for engineering reasons fell from almost 30% in 1968 to less than 5% in 1973. However, unlike Hoverlloyd, except in 1973 and 1976 when Seaspeed returned a profit of £100,000 and £5,000 respectively, the company made a loss before interest in every year since 1968. These drastically increased towards the end of the decade with British Rail continuing to guarantee operations. Seaspeed recorded a pre-tax loss of -£599,000 in 1977 and -£2,234,000 in 1978, then -£2,900,000 in 1980 and -£1,423,000 in 1981 when the company ceased trading and merged with Hoverlloyd.

British Rail Hovercraft Ltd Profit/Loss 1977–1981
Year	Turnover (£)	Profit/Loss (£)	Margin of Profit (%)
1977	£4,048,000	(-£599,000)	(-14.7%)
1978	£5,586,000	(-£2,234,000)	(-39.9%)
1979	£12,357,000	(-£813,000)	(-6.5%)
1980	£13,092,000	(-£2,900,000)	(-22.1%)
1981	£12,358,000	(-£1,423,000)	(-11.5%)

According to a parliamentary paper, over the period 1973 to 1980, Seaspeed incurred a net operating loss of £7 million. If interest had been charged at commercial rates on the balance outstanding to British Rail, there would have been not only a loss over the period, but, moreover, in each individual year, and the company would have been insolvent without the guarantee from British Rail.

==== Coach services ====
Similar to Hoverlloyd's provision, Seaspeed operated a coach link between Calais and Brussels which, in 1980, conveyed 20,000 passengers.

==== SR.N4 modifications ====
In early 1976, the British Rail board approved a plan to drastically upgrade the two SR.N4s by lengthening them, achieved via the insertion of an almost 17.1 metre (56.1 ft) long section. This change increased the passenger capacity of the craft from 254 to 418, while also raising the car capacity to 60. According to Paine and Syms, rival operator Hoverlloyd was interested in the modification, but did not have such work done to their own SR.N4 fleet, reportedly due to a lack of available finances.

== Isle of Wight services ==
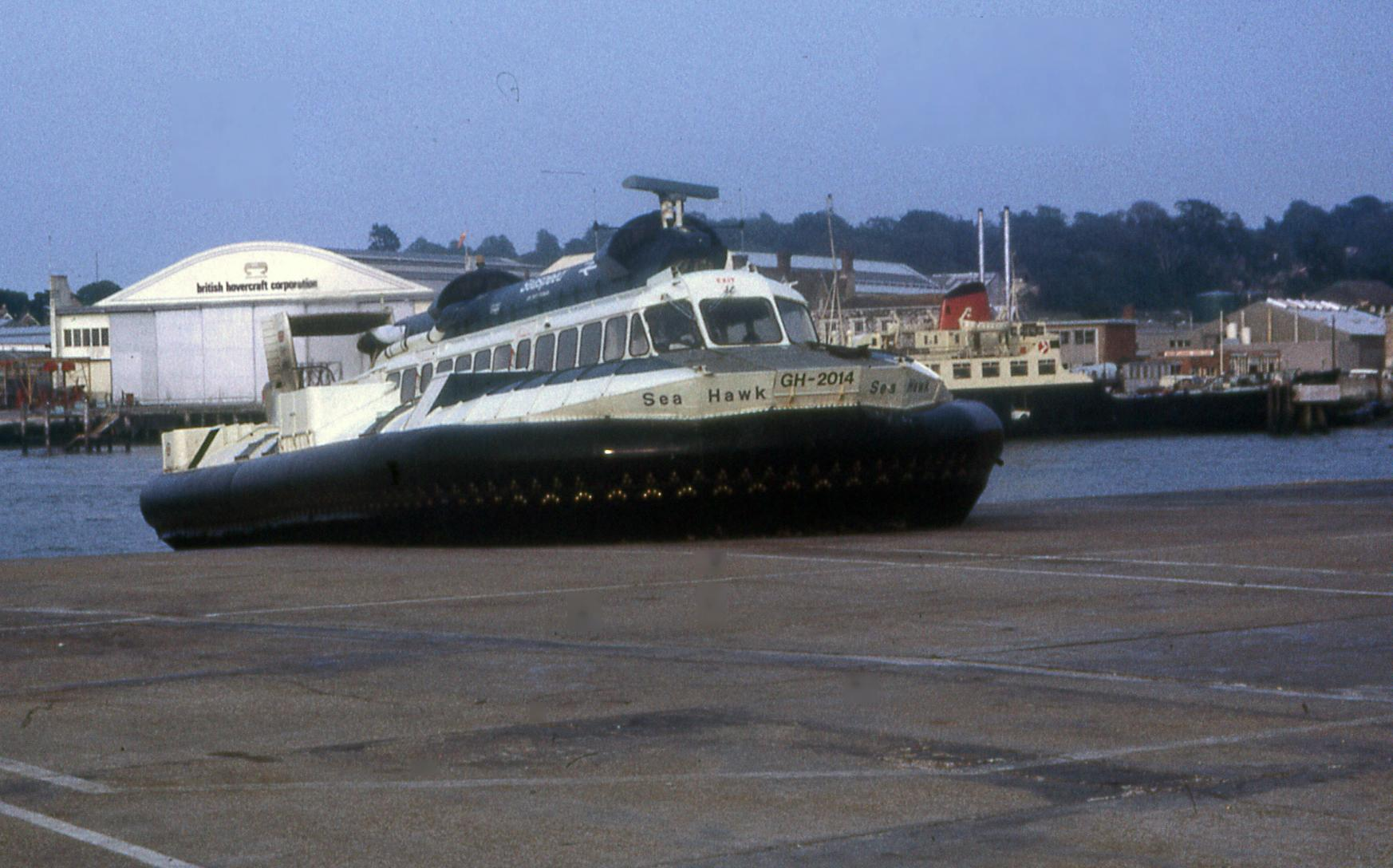
Seaspeed Sea Hawk at Cowes

Seaspeed also operated passenger-only services across the Solent using a pair of smaller SR.N6 hovercraft, named Sea Hawk and Sea Eagle. This service, running between Cowes and Southampton, commenced on 6 July 1966. This initial route was later joined by Portsmouth–Ryde and Portsmouth–Cowes services starting from Portsmouth Harbour railway station. By mid-1967, Seaspeed's Solent services had carried 67,600 passengers, the Southampton-Cowes route proved to be the most trafficked of the three services. The Southampton terminal was on the west side of the river Itchen just upstream of the floating bridge terminal. A bus link connected the service to Southampton Central station.

Seaspeed made various alterations to their smaller services over time. Between 1968 and 1972, trials of the 67-seater Hovermarine HM2 craft were conducted, but the company concluded it to be unsuited to its routes. By 1972, Seaspeed's SR.N6s had been stretched and furnished with uprated engines to increase their capacities. However, the company eventually concluded that the SR.N6s were too expensive to run to achieve a sufficient return on investment on any of the three Solent routes.

During 1976, the loss-making Solent routes and their associated craft were purchased from British Rail by British Hovercraft Corporation. They were then transferred to a subsidiary, Solent Seaspeed, of rival hovercraft operator Hovertravel, which already operated its own services in the area. During 1980, Hovertravel decided to entirely discontinue the Cowes-Southampton service; this move was attributed both to rising costs and increased competition on the route from watercraft such as hydrofoils and catamarans, opting instead to concentrate its resources on its Ryde-Southsea service, which was viewed as more commercially viable.

== Economics of large hovercraft operation ==
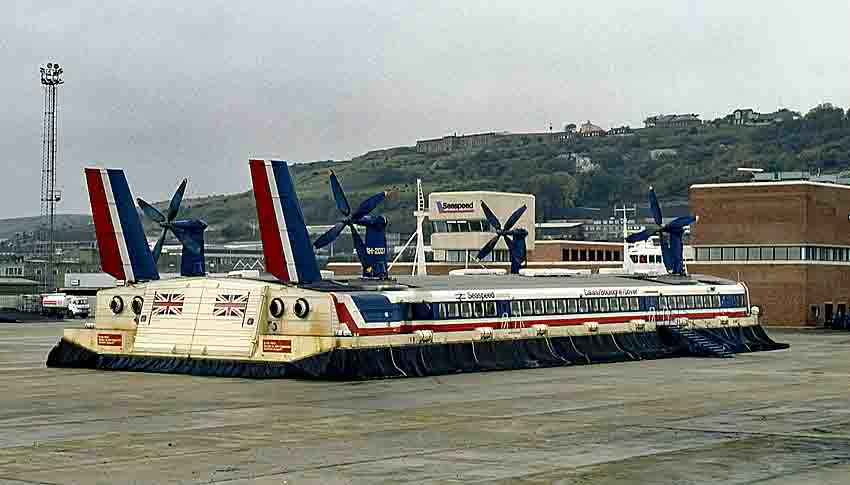
Seaspeed SR.N4 The Princess Anne at Dover Hoverport, Western Docks, 1980

Each SR.N4 was powered by an arrangement of four Bristol Proteus gas turbine engines; while these were marinised and proved to be one of the hovercraft's more reliable systems, they were relatively fuel-hungry, consuming significant amounts of aviation-grade kerosene. As the worldwide oil crisis of the 1970s caused fuel prices to rise sharply, the operation of the SR.N4 became increasingly uneconomic, especially in comparison to slower, diesel-powered ferries.

Unlike ferry operators, Seaspeed was wholly reliant on non-freight business (cars and foot passengers), and, outside the summer season, unable to offset this declining source of income with other forms of business activities. Staffing requirements brought on by the implementation of new legislation and actions by trade unions also contributed to the craft's increasing operating costs.

The closure of the British Hovercraft Corporation restricted support options, meaning that maintenance of the craft became more costly over time, and that neither like-for-like replacements or improved successor hovercraft were likely to be developed. Consequently, Sure was taken out of service in 1983 and cannibalised for parts to keep the rest of the fleet operating.

These combined factors gradually worsened Seaspeed's balance sheet as time progressed and demanded economies of scale, and consolidation of operations.

== Merger and rationalisation ==
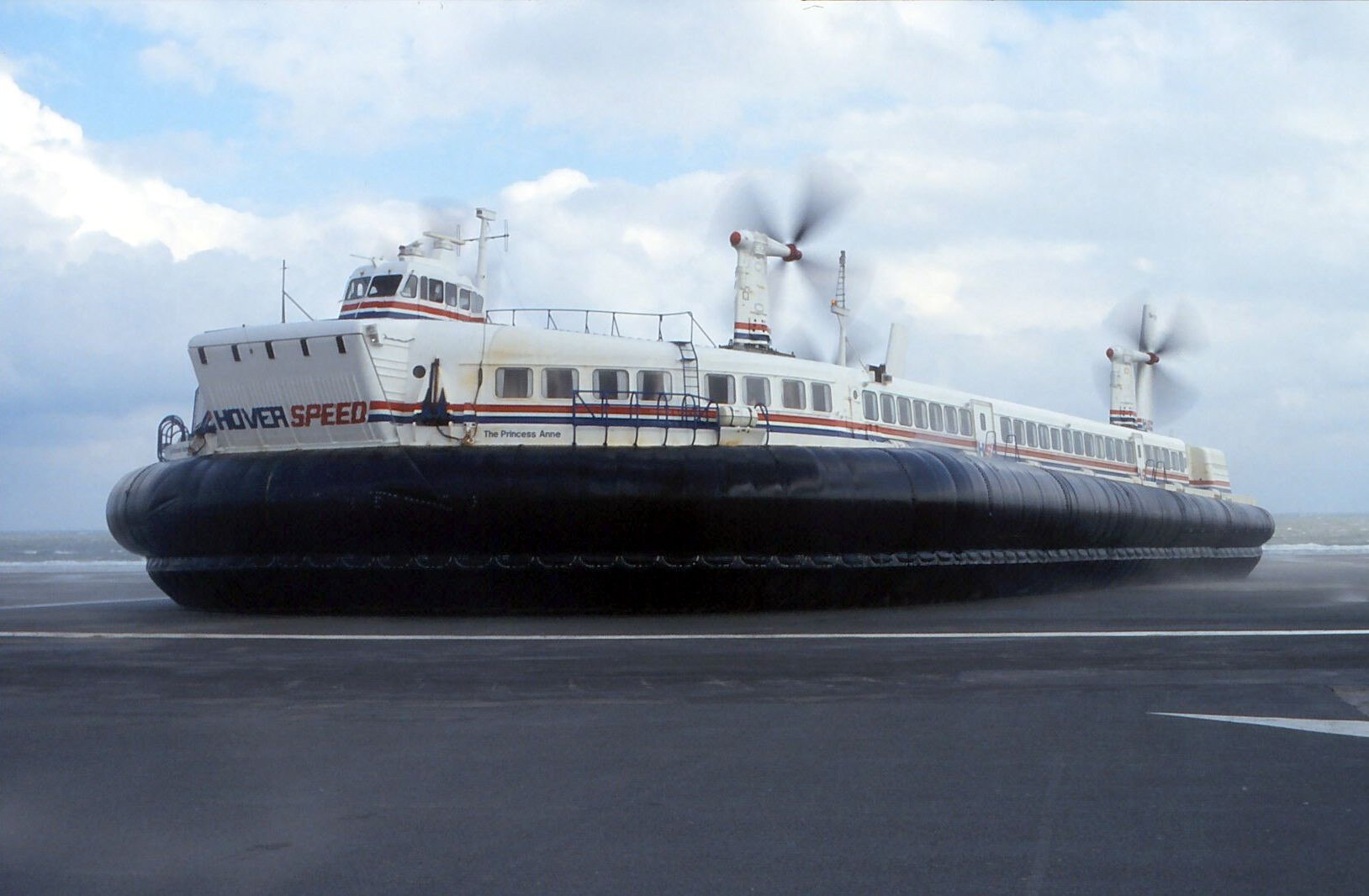
Hoverspeed SR.N4 Mk.III at Calais in September 2009

By 1980, it was clear that cross-Channel hovercraft operation could only continue economically if the two operating companies merged, with consequent rationalisation. Therefore, in 1981, Seaspeed and Hoverlloyd merged to create the combined Hoverspeed following the granting of permission by the Monopolies & Mergers Commission.

The former Hoverlloyd services from Ramsgate were withdrawn after the 1982 season and the four ex-Hoverlloyd craft were thereafter based at Dover but gradually withdrawn from service between 1983 and 1993, to be used for spare parts for Hoverspeed's remaining SR.N4 fleet.

In 1991, it was announced that the SR.N4 service would be eventually phased out entirely in favour of catamarans. Hoverspeed continued cross-Channel hovercraft operation until October 2000, when the last two SR.N4s were withdrawn and the era of hovercraft across the channel came to an end.

== Dover hoverports ==
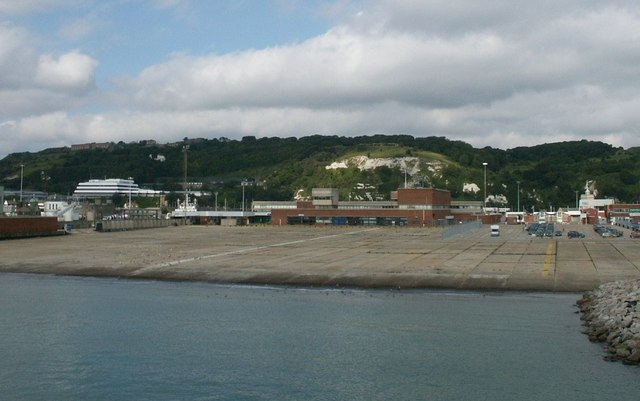
Hoverport, Dover Western Docks

Seaspeed began operating from Dover's Eastern Docks. British Rail built a new hoverport at the Western Docks, which opened for service in July 1978 (costing some £14 million compared to the original estimate of £8 million). The aim was twofold. One, to cater for the increase in the fleet capacity to four, with the prospect of two new French hovercraft entering the fleet, as well as to handle additional passenger volumes via the extended SR.N4s. Seaspeed would thus be able to compete with Hoverlloyd's operations in Pegwell Bay. Two, to provide a direct rail link to London and attract business class professionals, a rail connection was envisaged, similar to that at Boulogne Le Portel which had been developed in 1968. In the event, only one of the French vessels was deemed fit for purpose and it retired early in 1983, plagued by malfunctions and limitations. Moreover, the direct rail link via Dover Western Docks never materialised and a bus service ran to and from the station instead. The terminal was officially opened by the Duke of Kent in September 1981.

== Fleet ==
Ship	Built	In service	Tonnage	History
GH-2015 SR.N6-011; GH-2015 Sea Eagle	1965 (Saunders-Roe, East Cowes, Isle of Wight)	1966-1976	9	Stretched and converted to converted to SR.N6 Mk 1S specification in 1972, subsequently scrapped
GH-2014 SR.N6-009; GH-2014 Sea Hawk	1965 (Saunders-Roe, East Cowes, Isle of Wight)	1966-1976	9	Stretched and converted to converted to SR.N6 Mk 1S specification in 1971, now on display at The Hovercraft Museum, Lee-on-the-Solent
HM-2-001	1968 (Hovermarine, Woolston, England)	1968-1972	19.3	
GH-2016 HM-2-004	1968 (Hovermarine, Woolston, England)	1968-1972	19.3	
GH-2017 HM-2-007	1968 (Hovermarine, Woolston, England)	1968-1972	19.3	
GH-2094 Ryde Rapide	1983 (Hovermarine, Woolston, England)	1983	25.4	
GH-2006 The Princess Margaret	1968 (British Hovercraft Corporation, East Cowes, Isle of Wight)	1968-1981	168 (1968-78), 320 (1978 onwards)	Scrapped at Lee-on-the-Solent in March 2018
GH-2007 The Princess Anne	1968 (British Hovercraft Corporation, East Cowes, Isle of Wight)	1969-1981	168 (1968-78), 320 (1978 onwards)	Now on display at The Hovercraft Museum, Lee-on-the-Solent
GH-2031 SR.N6-025	1965 (Saunders-Roe, East Cowes, Isle of Wight)	1976	10.9	Now on display at The Hovercraft Museum, Lee-on-the-Solent
BL.341.931 Ingénieur Jean Bertin	1977 (Société d'Étude et de Développement des Aéroglisseurs Marins (SEDAM), Pauillac, France)	1978-1981	260	Scrapped at Boulogne (Le Portel) Hoverport in 1985

== In popular culture ==
The SR.N4 GH-2006 Princess Margaret featured in scenes from the 1971 James Bond film Diamonds Are Forever starring Sean Connery. The same craft also appears in Someone Behind the Door starring Charles Bronson, Jill Ireland and Anthony Perkins, released in the same year.

== See also ==
- British Hovercraft Corporation
