= SR.N4 =

Hovercraft built for English Channel services

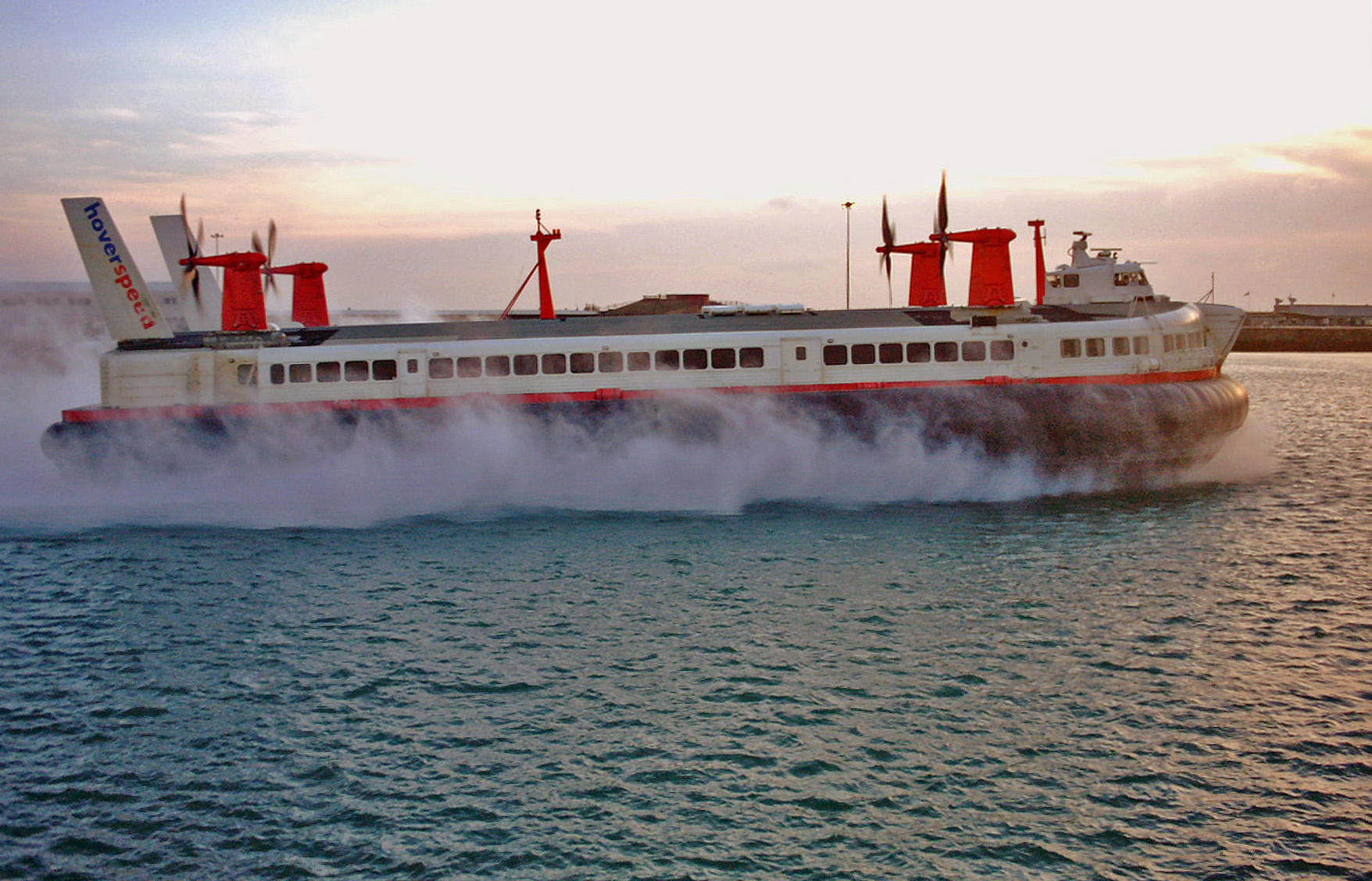
- Mark III SR.N4 arriving in Dover on its last commercial flight October 2000

Class overview
- Name: SR.N4 Mountbatten class
- Builders: British Hovercraft Corporation
- Operators: Hoverlloyd; Seaspeed; Hoverspeed
- In service: 1968–2000
- Completed: 6
- Active: 0
- Scrapped: 5
- Preserved: 1

General characteristics (Mark III)
- Type: Hovercraft
- Tonnage: 320 t
- Length: 56.38 m (185 ft 0 in)
- Beam: 23.77 m (78 ft 0 in)
- Height: 11.48 m (37 ft 8 in) on landing pads
- Installed power: 4 x 3,800 shp (2,800 kW)
- Propulsion: 4 x Rolls-Royce Marine Proteus gas turbines for lift and propulsion, each driving a single four-bladed variable-pitch propeller
- Speed: 70 knots (81 mph; 130 km/h)
- Capacity: up to 60 cars and 418 passengers

The SR.N4 (Saunders-Roe Nautical 4) hovercraft (also known as the Mountbatten class hovercraft) is a retired combined passenger and vehicle-carrying class of hovercraft. The type has the distinction of being the largest civil hovercraft to have ever been put into service.

Work on the SR.N4 was initiated in 1965 by Saunders-Roe. By the time that the vehicle's first trials took place in early 1968, Saunders-Roe had merged with Vickers' hovercraft division to form the British Hovercraft Corporation, who continued development. Power was provided by four Rolls-Royce Proteus marine turboshaft engines each driving its own lift fan and pylon-mounted steerable propulsion propeller. The SR.N4 was the largest hovercraft then built, designed to carry 254 passengers in two cabins besides a four-lane automobile bay which held up to 30 cars. Cars were driven from a bow ramp just forward of the wheelhouse. The first design was 40 metres (131 ft) long, weighed 190 long tons (193 t), was capable of 83 knots (96 mph; 154 km/h) and could cruise at over 60 knots (69 mph; 111 km/h).

The SR.N4s operated regular services across the English Channel between 1968 and 2000. In response to operator demands, stretched versions of the SR.N4 were developed, culminating in the Mk.III variant, which had almost double the capacity for carrying both cars and passengers as the Mk.I. While interest was expressed in military applications for the type, no vehicles were ultimately used for such purposes. Following the fleet's withdrawal from cross-channel services, a single remaining Mk.III example, GH-2007 Princess Anne, remains on static display at the Hovercraft Museum at Lee-on-the-Solent as of October 2026.

== Development ==
Hovercraft landing in Calais

Boarding a Hovercraft with a vehicle

=== Origins ===
In August 1962, the original concept for the SR.N4, which had been conceived at the same time as the SR.N2 was being designed, was abandoned. This original concept had effectively been a pair of elongated SR.N2 fixed together in a side-by-side placement and would have been powered by an arrangement of four pairs of Blackburn A.129 turboshaft engines. In its place, a new proposed hovercraft, which was referred to as the SR.N4 as well, was considerably larger and heavier, and powered by three pairs of Rolls-Royce Proteus marinised gas turbine engine. However, during early 1963, work on the SR.N4 was put on hold due to a greater priority having been placed on the completion of the SR.N5 instead. In late 1964, it was decided to recommence design work on the proposed SR.N4.

By the end of 1964, it had been concluded that, due to the improved projected performance of the craft's flexible skirt having lowered the power requirements involved, only two pairs of Proteus engines would be required instead of three. At this stage, the proposed design for the SR.N4 had a displacement of 165 tons and a payload of up to 33 cars and 116 passengers; this would not substantially differ from the final design adopted for the type.

Experience gained from the SR.N5 and SR.N6 would contribute to the design of aspects of the larger SR.N4, which would be four times the size of any preceding hovercraft. This approach is credited with having been less expensive and having resulted in a more commercially viable hovercraft than would have been if it had been constructed as per the earlier incarnation of the SR.N4 and then required to perform modifications to improve the capabilities of aspects such as the skirt, which had been considerably advanced by development of the SR.N5 and SR.N6. Specific improvements included the adoption of triangular rubber 'finger'-like attachments to the curtain which provided for a better seal between the hovercraft and the water's surface as well as being cheaper and easier to maintain than previous configurations.

During the mid-1960s, some management figures within British Rail had become interested in the potential for operating a fleet of hovercraft for scheduled services that would link up to Britain's national rail system. In November 1965, Frank Cousins, the Minister of Technology, announced that British Rail would participate in the development of the SR.N4 and would be a customer for the type. While orders had already been placed for the SR.N4 by this point, the British Railways Board had decided to commit to taking delivery of the first craft to be produced; this was particularly convenient as the two orders which had been placed by Swedish operator Cross-Channel Hover Services specifically excluded accepting delivery of the first example. By the end of 1965, having acquired three firm orders, it was now plausible for production of the SR.N4 to proceed.

=== Prototype and testing ===
Having realised that the market for large hovercraft was not yet large enough to sustain a number of competing companies at that time, in 1966, the hovercraft divisions of both Saunders-Roe and Vickers Supermarine merged to form a new united entity, known as the British Hovercraft Corporation (BHC), which was headquartered on the Isle of Wight. In autumn 1966, production work commenced on the structure of the first SR.N4, which was internally designated 001. The vehicle was assembled in the same hangar in which the three Saunders-Roe Princess flying boats had been constructed 15 years before. During 1967, as 001 was taking shape, it was announced that the SR.N4 had been named the Mountbatten-class. Throughout the development and production of 001, both Hoverlloyd and Seaspeed carefully monitored progress on the project.

In October 1967, the completed 001 was officially presented to gathered members of the press and to various representatives and dignitaries. On 20 November 1967, the first engine run was performed, after which 11 weeks of intense test runs on land were performed and the exposed faults were addressed. On 4 February 1968, 001 was launched onto water for the first time. The launch, while successful, had involved some risk due to the lack of space to manoeuvre with an untested control system. Later that same day, 001 conducted its maiden flight.

As experience with the prototype accumulated, the control arrangement proved to be quite effective even within confined spaces; incidents involving a loss of control did occur during the test programme, but these were mainly due to error on the part of the operator. Ray Wheeler, BHC's chief engineer, was reportedly very pleased with the progress made during the initial trials. At the same time, 001 required substantial refinement and alteration in order to become a commercially viable craft. The air intakes had to be substantially modified in order to minimise salt ingestion, and a revised skirt system was also developed.

== Design ==
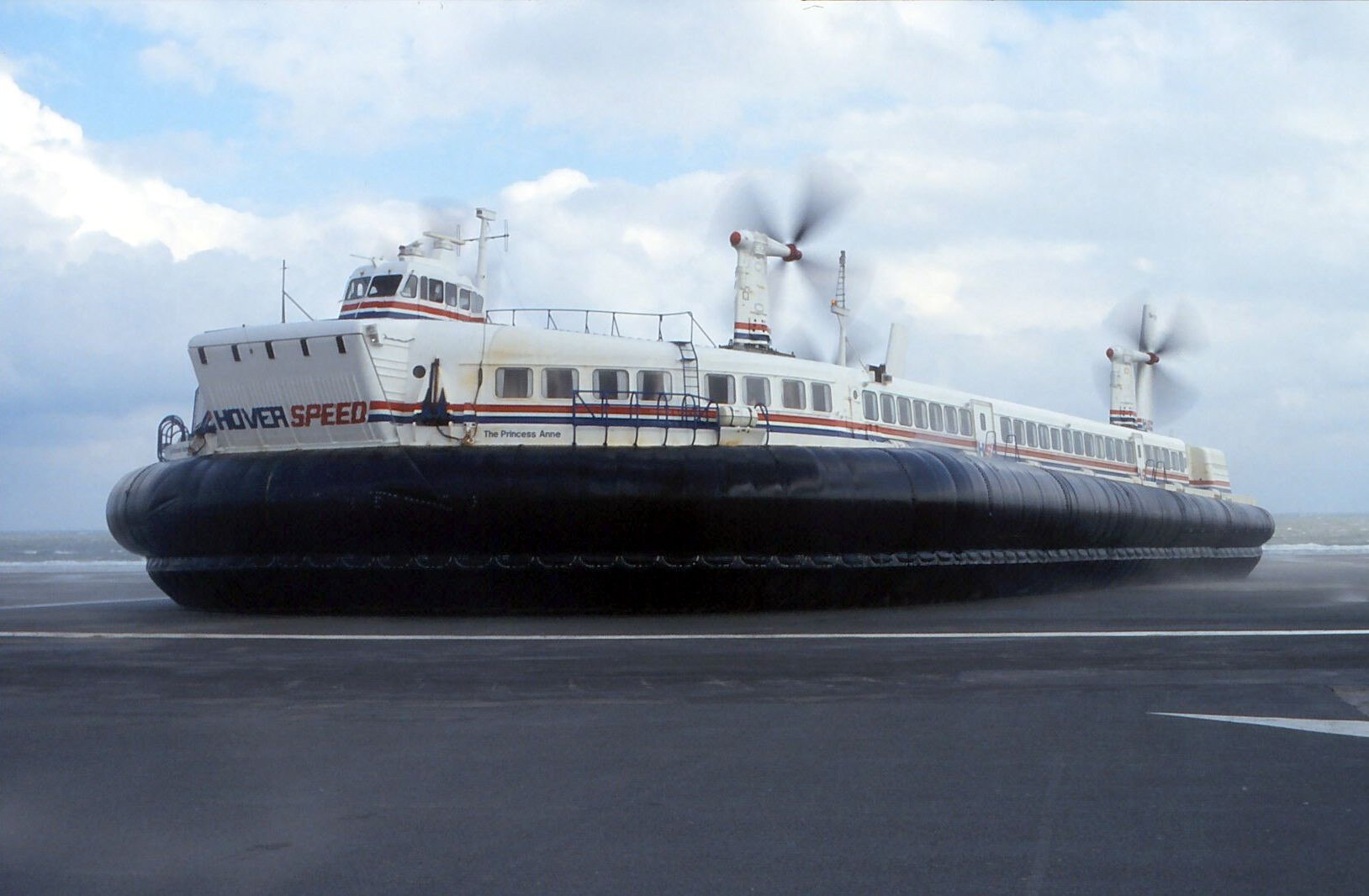
Princess Anne at Calais

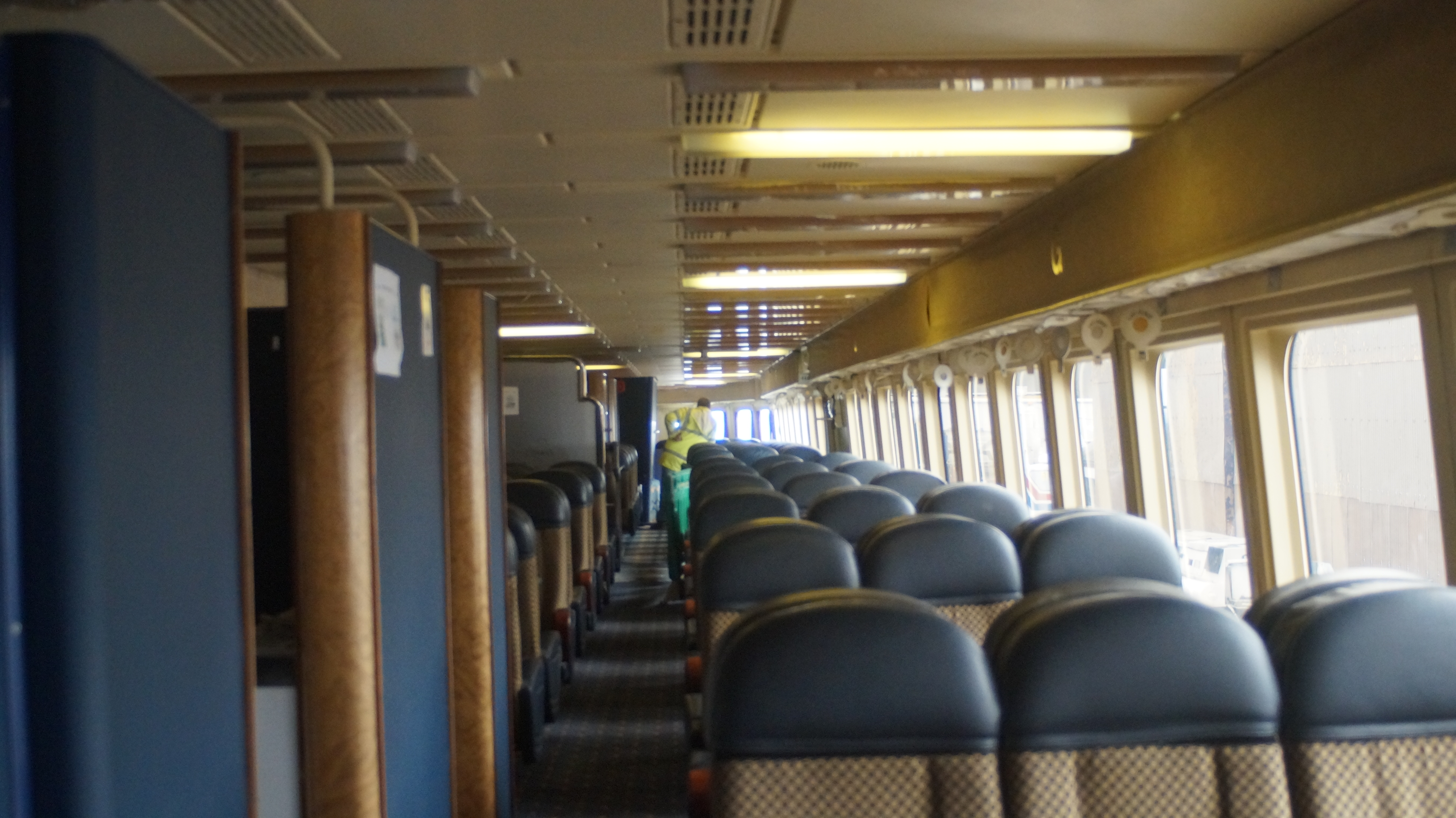
The interior of The Princess Anne in 2019

The SR.N4 was the biggest hovercraft to have been completed upon its introduction. Its primary structure comprised a large modular buoyancy tank, the internal structure of which was divided into 24 watertight compartments. It had an identical platform shape to the smaller SR.N5, being rectangular with a semi-circular bow and a beam-to-length ratio of 1:1.66. The SR.N4 had a dual radar system for navigation, allowing the craft to operate in zero visibility - Type Racal Decca Bridgemaster. A GPS navigation system was fitted.

The SR.N4 was powered by four Rolls-Royce Proteus turboprop engines. The Proteus engines each drove a set of 19 ft (5.8 m) diameter steerable Dowty Rotol propellers, arranged in two pairs on pylons positioned on top of the craft's roof; upon the SR.N4's introduction to service, these were the largest propellers in the world. Six independent electrohydraulic systems, each driven from the main gearboxes, powered the movement of the fins and pylons, while a further four units were used to actuate the variable-pitch propellers.

The control cabin of the SR.N4 resembled the flight deck of an aircraft, being relatively cramped in comparison with the bridge of a typical vessel. It housed a crew of three, comprising a captain, first officer/flight engineer, and a second officer/navigator; the main role of the second officer was to avoid collisions, primarily using a Decca 629 radar to do so. The flying controls appeared broadly similar to a typical aircraft, using an assortment of rudder pedals, joysticks, yokes, separate propeller pitch levels, and engine speed controls; however, their functionality often differed substantially, such as the ability for the yoke to command the pitch of all four propellers.

The SR.N4 is fitted with a 12-ton skirt which runs under the perimeter of the whole craft and employs a complex structure. On the underside of the buoyancy tanks, five 21-inch platforms (known as 'elephant feet') were positioned so that the craft could stably rest on three of them.

Fuel was contained within flexible bags located at all four corners; the craft could be trimmed by redistributing fuel between the fore and aft tanks to better match the load and prevailing weather conditions. The craft would consume 1,000 gallons per hour at a cruise of 50 knots (58 mph; 93 km/h) before refuelling with an approximate range of 150 miles (240 km). Maximum fuel capacity was 8,068 imp gal (36,680 L); about 29 tons.

The stern of the craft featured a sizeable set of doors for the loading and unloading of vehicles onto the car deck as well as all four of the exhausts for the Proteus engines. Another set of loading doors was located at the bow.

The SR.N4 could operate up to gale force 8 wind on the beaufort scale and 3.5m swell seas.

== Operational service ==
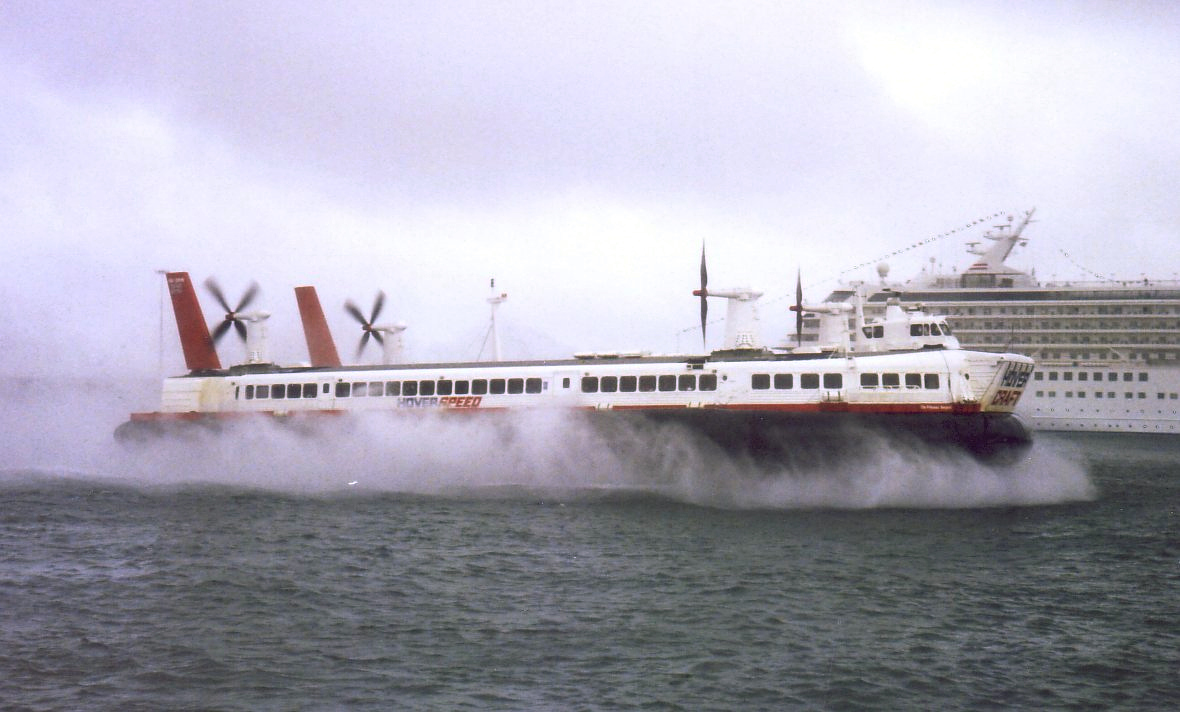
Princess Margaret at the mouth of the Western Docks in Dover, 1998

Upon completion of the prototype SR.N4, Charles Brindle, the managing director of British Rail Hovercraft, was responsible for establishing the first cross-Channel route for scheduled services by the type. In October 1966, Brindle and several engineers surveyed several potential sites on both the British and French sides of the English Channel using an SR.N6 to determine their suitability for the hovercraft service, which had been given the name Seaspeed. Amongst the most suitable candidates had been Dover or Folkestone on the English side and Calais or Boulogne on the French side.

It was soon determined that Dover and Boulogne would be the preferable option for the maiden route, a decision that had been motivated in part by the local Chamber of Commerce having agreed to build a suitable hoverport to readily facilitate such operations. As there was no funding available for pre-service passenger trials, the opening season of active operations effectively served as a continuation of the trials activities as well. Brindle was aware that BHC would not be paid until the SR.N4 was in service, and thus there was a considerable emphasis placed on getting the craft ready for commercial use right at the point of delivery.

In August 1968, the first SR.N4 entered commercial service with the GH-2006 Princess Margaret being initially operated by Seaspeed between Dover and Boulogne. Rival operator Hoverlloyd built the world's first purpose-built hoverport at Ramsgate Hoverport, specifically designed for the SR.N4, to also serve the Calais route.

The journey time from Dover to Boulogne was roughly 35 minutes, with six trips per day being conducted at peak times. The fastest ever crossing of the English Channel by a commercial car-carrying hovercraft was 22 minutes, achieved on 14 September 1995 by the SR.N4 Mk.III GH-2007 Princess Anne on its 10:00 a.m. service.

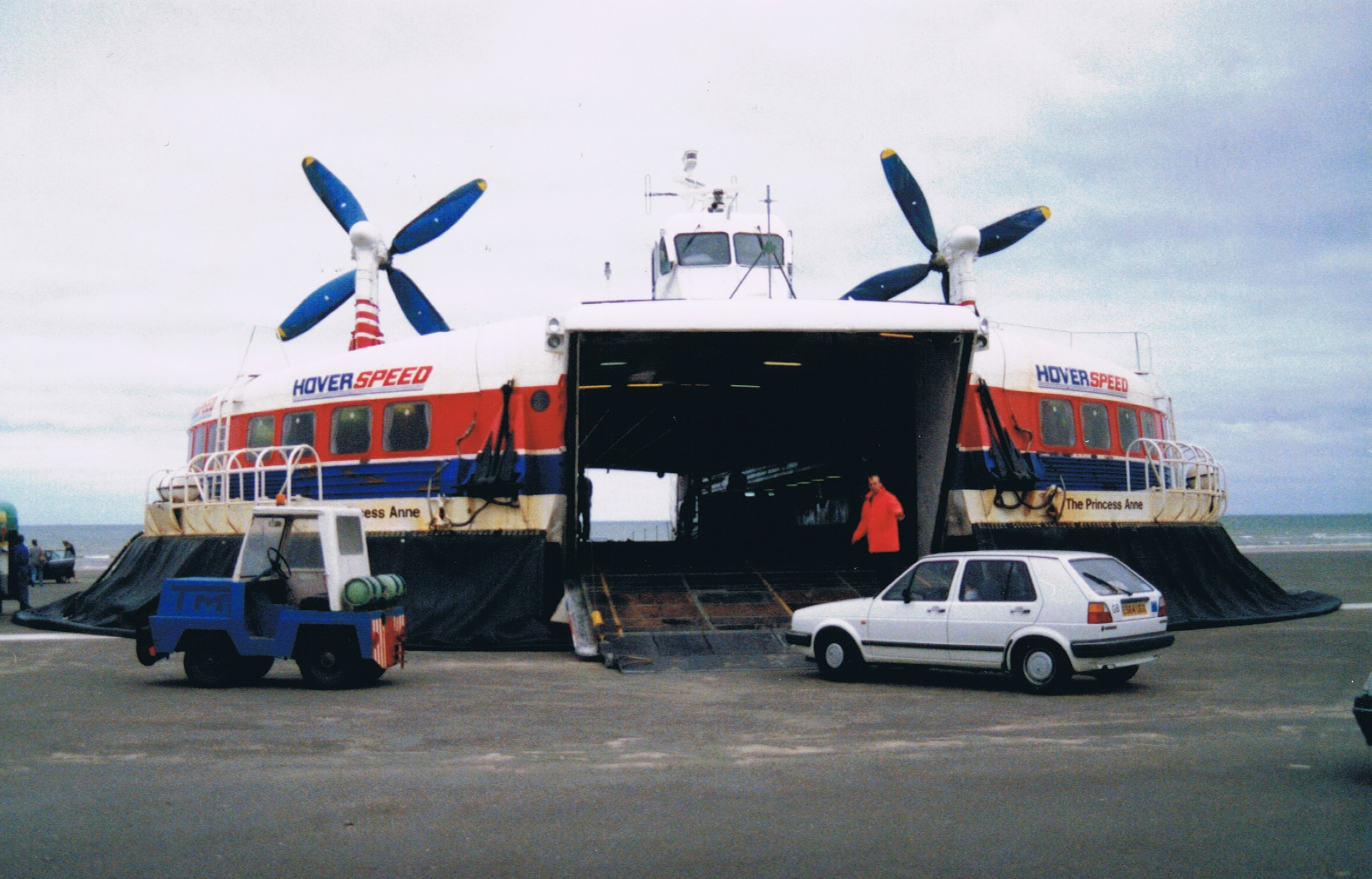
Princess Anne loading in 1989

In 1972, the first SR.N4s were temporarily withdrawn for conversion to Mk.II specification which would provide for seven further car spaces and 28 more passengers. The first of the enlarged craft, the Swift, entered service at the beginning of February 1973. The capacity increase was achieved by removing an inner passenger cabin in order to accommodate the extra cars and widening the outer passenger cabin: this was achieved without changing the overall footprint of the craft. New aircraft-style forward-facing seats created an atmosphere of enhanced sophistication, and a redesigned skirt was intended to reduce window spray, enhancing the view out for passengers, and to give a smoother ride in rough seas: contemporary reports nevertheless commented on the "unsprung" nature of the ride.

After 1976, a pair of SR.N4s were refitted with new deep skirts and stretched by almost 56.1 ft (17.1 m), increasing capacity to 418 passengers and 60 cars at the cost of a weight increase to roughly 320 t (315 long tons). To maintain speed, the engines were upgraded to four 3,800 shaft horsepower (2,834 kW) models, which were fitted with four 21 ft (6.4 m) diameter steerable Dowty Rotol propellers. The work cost around £5 million for each craft, and they were designated Mark IIIs; the improvements allowed them to operate in seas up to 11 ft 6 in (3.5 m) high and with 57.5-mile-per-hour (92.5 km/h) winds.

The two main commercial operators (Hoverlloyd and Seaspeed) merged in 1981 to form Hoverspeed, which operated six SR.N4 of all marks. The last of the craft was withdrawn from service in October 2000 and Hoverspeed itself ceased operations in November 2005.

=== Accidents ===
Most incidents were benign and resulted in little more than the vehicles towed back to shore. In 1978, the GH-2007 Princess Anne lost much of her air-cushion skirt in heavy seas 7 miles off Dover, resulting in a Marine Accident Investigation Branch investigation. In March 1985, 4 passengers lost their lives when GH-2006 Princess Margaret crashed into a pier at the entrance of the Port of Dover from Calais in force 6 to 7 heavy seas.

=== Military interest ===
The Royal Navy considered a mine sweeping version of the SR.N4, hovercraft being almost invulnerable to mines. A minesweeping version of the SR.N4 was thought to be capable of carrying the same equipment as a Hunt-class mine countermeasures vessel, while being cheaper to purchase, although more expensive to operate. The use of hovercraft for minesweeping never got further than the concept stage, although an SR.N3 was used by the Inter-Service Hovercraft Unit for trials.

== Surviving examples ==
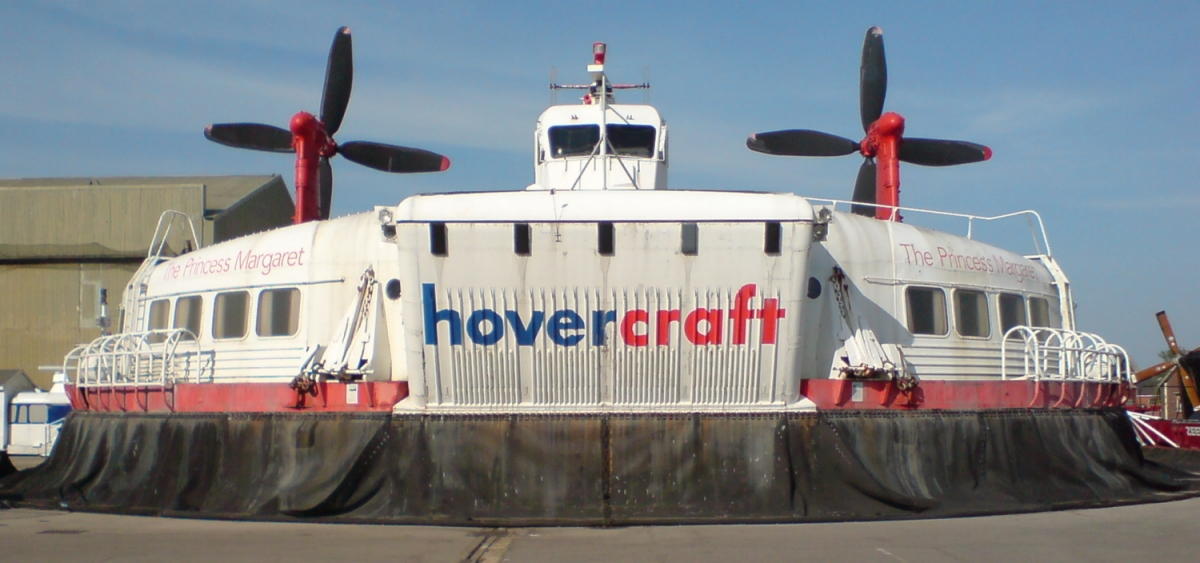
Princess Margaret at the Hovercraft Museum in May 2008

The two remaining Mk.III examples of the craft (GH-2006 Princess Margaret and GH-2007 Princess Anne) were bought by Wensley Haydon-Baillie for £500,000 and were stored at Lee-on-Solent, next to the Hovercraft Museum. Haydon-Baillie is the owner of the super yacht Brave Challenger which uses the same Rolls-Royce Proteus Marine engines as the SR.N4s. The purchase included seven years worth of spares including engines.

As of winter 2015 all engines and APUs had been removed from the craft. The SR.N4s were put up for sale and Hover Transit Services of Bolton, Ontario, proposed putting the hovercraft back in operation (following a US$10 million purchase and refurbishment) on Lake Ontario with service between Rochester, New York, and Toronto, Canada. The plan did not come to fruition, with government officials concluding that the organisation lacked the experience necessary to be viable.

The land on which the Hovercraft Museum stands is owned by Homes England. The proposed redevelopment of the site has led to the two craft being threatened with scrapping, but a petition was launched with the aim of preserving one of the craft, which led into a 3-year lease of the hovercraft to the museum in August 2016 with the intention of subsequently permanently handing over the hovercraft to the museum, The Princess Anne was the craft chosen to be kept and will be restored in a former Seaspeed livery.

In March 2018, GH-2006 Princess Margaret was scrapped at Lee-on-Solent. GH-2007 The Princess Anne remains on site leased to the Hovercraft Museum.

== Production ==
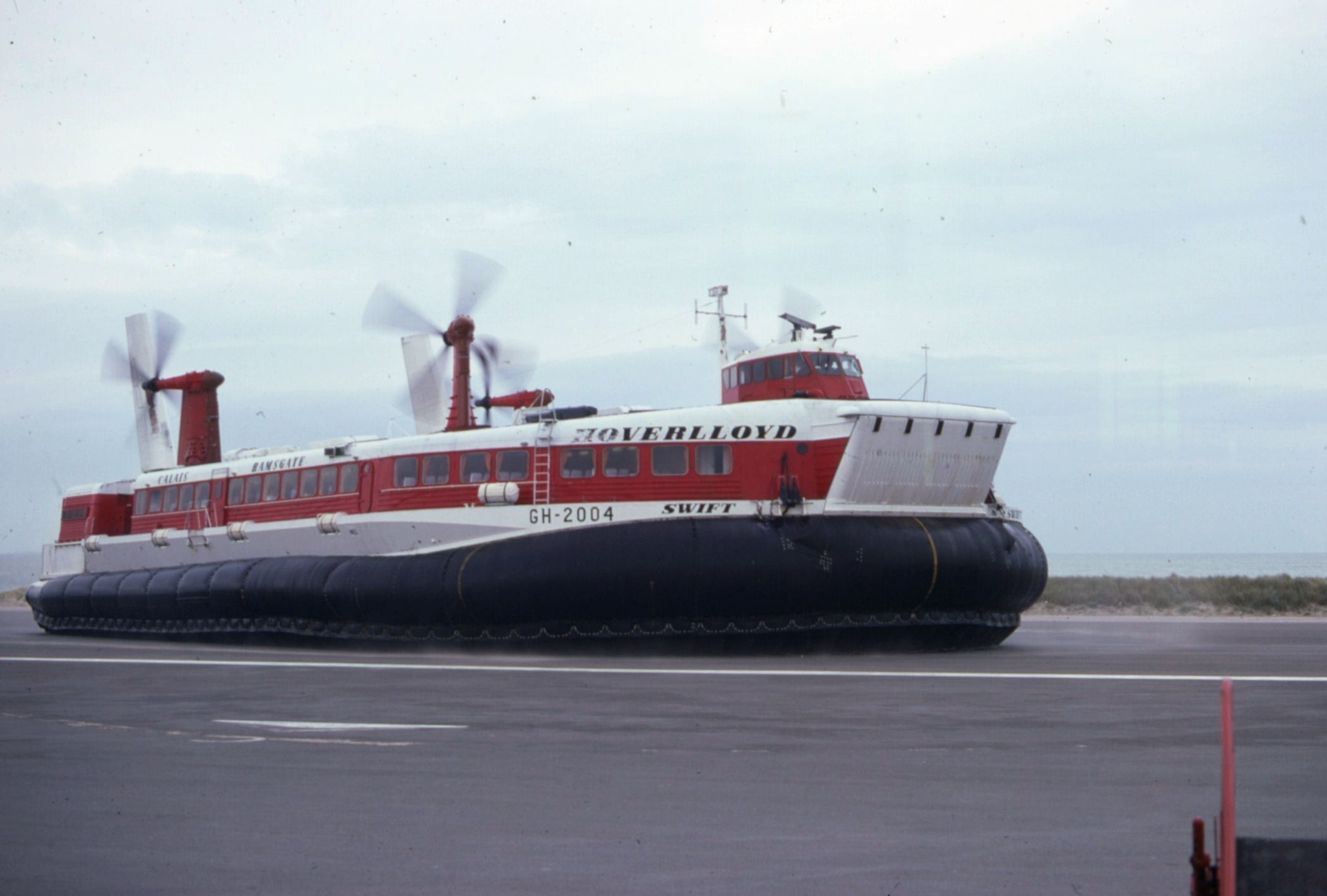
SR.N4 GH-2004 Swift, 1974

Built as Mk.I unless specified otherwise.

- 01 – GH-2006 Princess Margaret 1968, Seaspeed – originally the prototype, converted to Mk.III specification in 1979. Scrapped at Lee-on-Solent in March 2018
- 02 – GH-2004 Swift, Hoverlloyd – converted to Mk.II specification for February 1973, broken up in 2004 at the Hovercraft Museum
- 03 – GH-2005 Sure 1968, Hoverlloyd – converted to Mk.II specification in 1972, broken up in 1983 for spares
- 04 – GH-2007 Princess Anne, Seaspeed – converted to Mk.III specification in 1978, on display at the Hovercraft Museum
- 05 – GH-2008 Sir Christopher 1972, Hoverlloyd – converted to Mk.II specification in 1974, broken up 1998 for spares
- 06 – GH-2054 The Prince of Wales, Hoverlloyd – built as Mk.II, scrapped in 1993 following an electrical fire

== Specification ==
=== Dimensions ===
	Mark 1	Mark 2	Mark 3
Length	39.68 m (130 ft 2 in)		56.38 m (185 ft 0 in)
Beam	23.77 m (78 ft 0 in)		
Height	11.48 m (37 ft 8 in) on landing pads		
Gross weight	165 t	200 t	320 t
Powerplant	4 x 3,400 shp Rolls-Royce Proteus gas turbines		4 x 3,800 shp Rolls-Royce Proteus gas turbines
Load:	30 cars and 250 passengers	36 cars and 278 passengers	up to 60 cars and 418 passengers (112 tonnes maximum)

=== Performance ===
- Max speed: Mark 1 – 65 knots (75 mph; 120 km/h) (calm water, zero wind, at gross laden weight)
  Mk.II – 70 knots (81 mph; 130 km/h)
- Normal operating speeds: 40 – 60 knots (69 mph; 110 km/h)
- Endurance: 4 hours (maximum power, 2,800 Imperial gallons of fuel)
- Gradient: 1 in 11

== See also ==
- N500 Naviplane
- Zubr-class LCAC
