= Hoverport =

Terminal for hovercraft

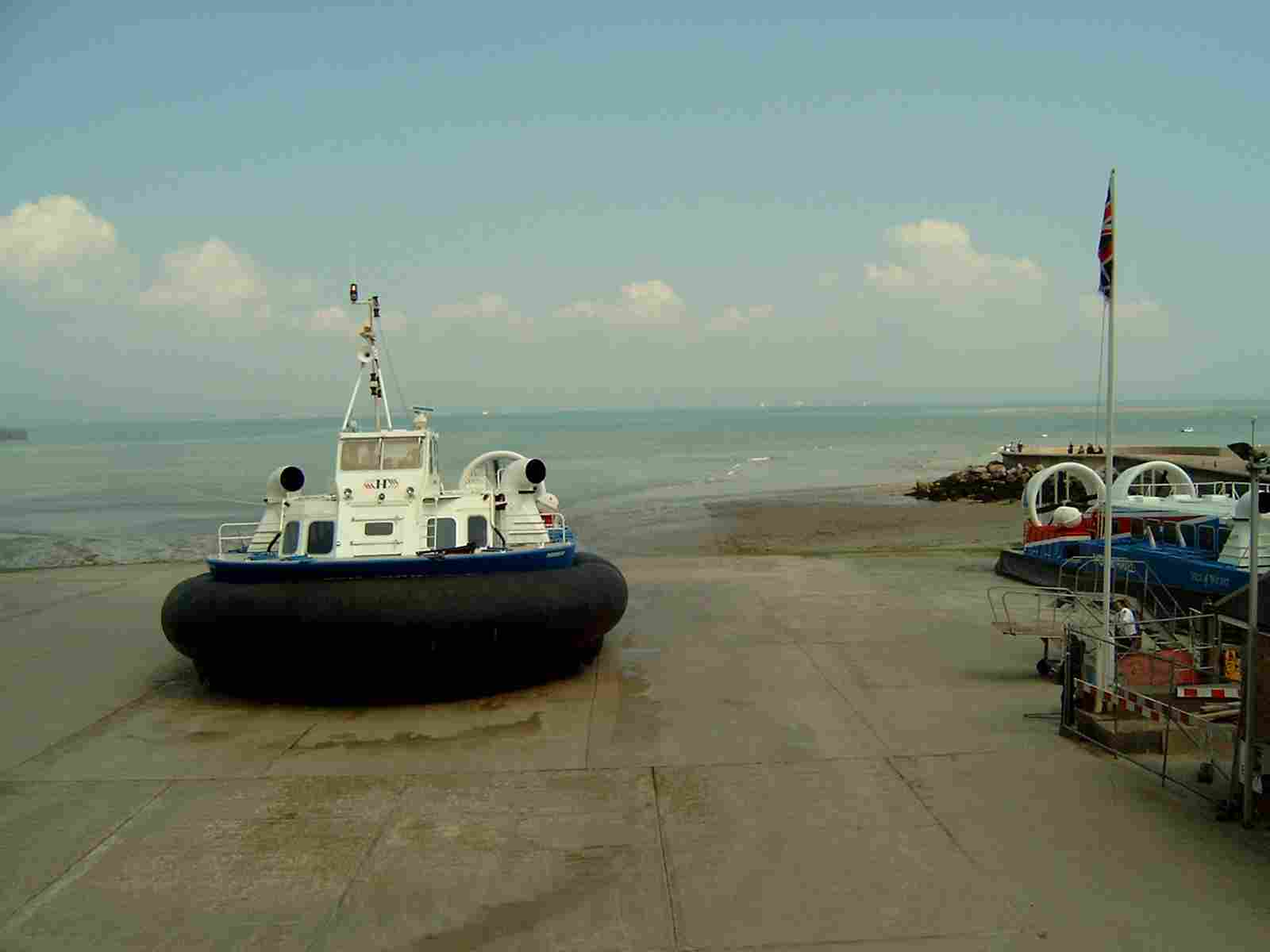
Ryde Hoverport is a civilian hoverport on the Isle of Wight, UK

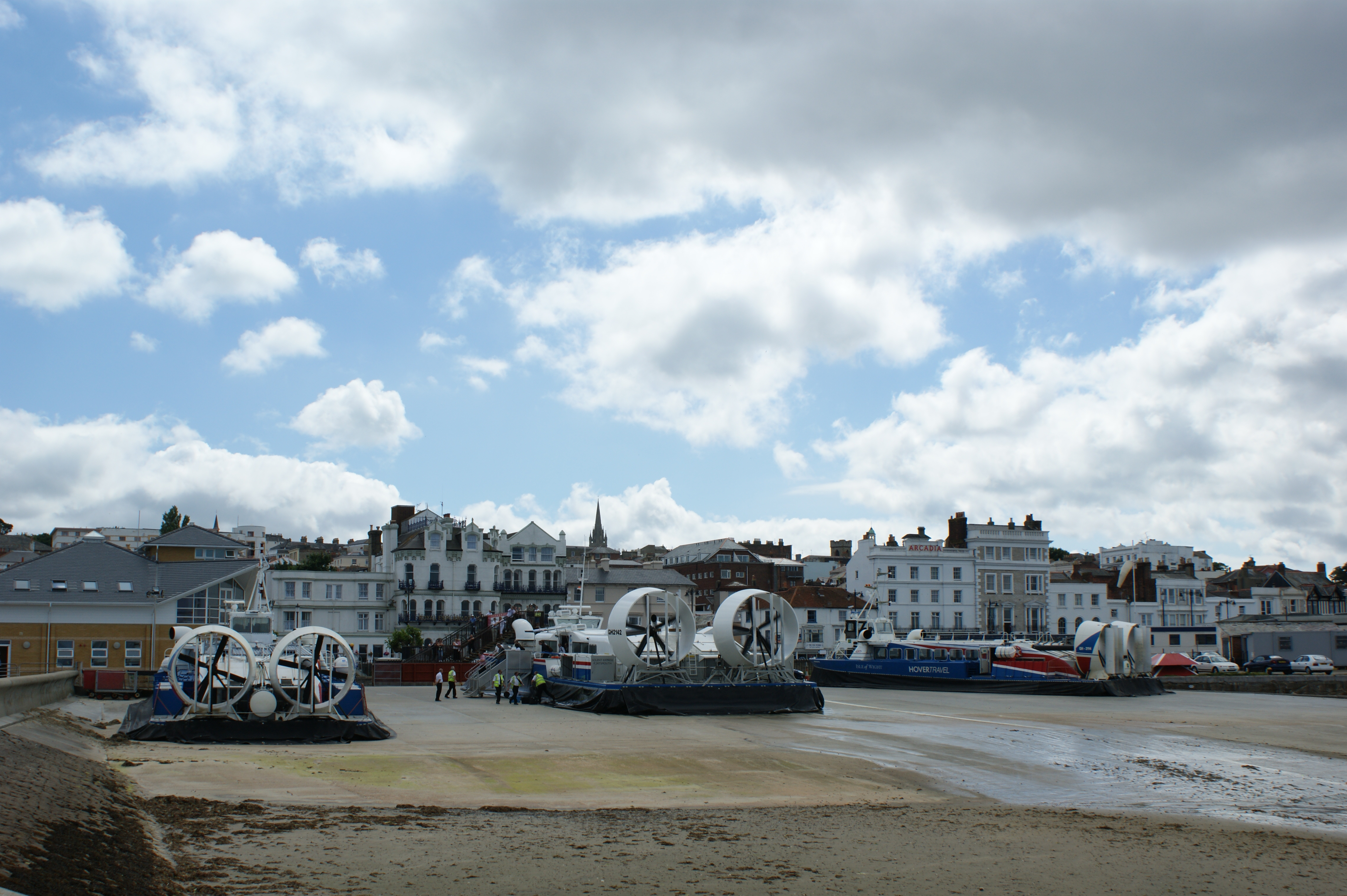
Looking inland at low tide, Ryde Hoverport

A hoverport is a terminal for hovercraft, having passenger facilities where needed and infrastructure to allow the hovercraft to come on land. Today, only a small number of civilian hoverports remain, due to the relatively high fuel consumption of hovercraft compared to traditional ferries. Military/Paramilitary hoverports also exist however, for example in Haldia in India, from which the Indian Coast Guard operates three hovercraft.

The world's first purpose-built hoverport was the Ramsgate Hoverport which was a cross-channel port in Kent, England.

== See also ==
- Port of entry
- Airport
  - Altiport
  - Heliport
  - Spaceport
  - STOLport
  - Wayport
- Seaplane base
- Seaport
