= Wensley Haydon-Baillie =

British businessman (born 1943)

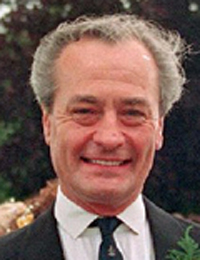
Wensley Haydon-Baillie

Wensley Grosvenor Haydon-Baillie (born 1943) is a British businessman. A company he invested in, Porton International, sold at high prices when it seemed it had a cure for herpes. It collapsed when it turned out it did not and the company wound up selling at a discounted price to Ipsen Pharmaceutical.

He owned a collection of Rolls-Royces and an aviation museum housing and restoring many Spitfires. He also owned Wentworth Woodhouse in Yorkshire – one of the largest private homes in Europe with an assumed 365 rooms. In the 1980s, he invested millions in a firm that claimed to have a cure for herpes but it never materialised and in 1998 he admitted to debts of £13m.

In 1994, Haydon-Baillie married Samantha Acland, a secretary. He was once the owner of the two largest passenger hovercraft in the world, the SRN4s, and also one of the fastest superyachts in the world, the GTY Brave Challenger.

Haydon-Baillie is a descendant of Royal Navy officer Jeremiah Coghlan.
