= SR.N6 =

Model of hovercraft

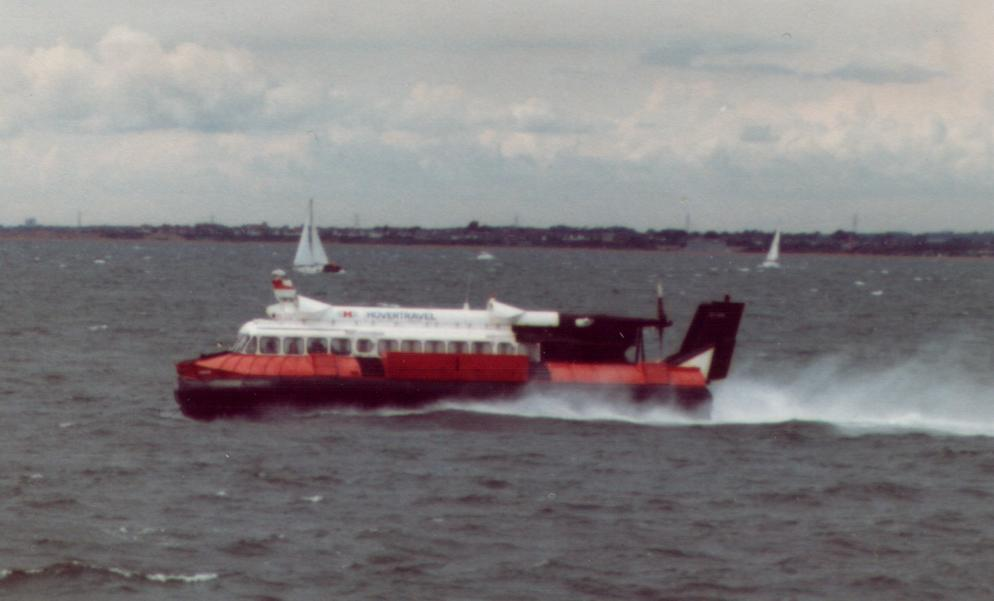
- SR.N6 of Hovertravel on the Solent, 1982

Class overview
- Name: SR.N6 Winchester class
- Builders: British Hovercraft Corporation
- Preceded by: SR.N5
- Built: 1964-1982
- Completed: 55

General characteristics
- Type: hovercraft
- Displacement: 10.9 tons
- Length: 17.78 m (58 ft 4 in)
- Beam: 7.97 m (26 ft 2 in)
- Height: 6.32 m (20 ft 9 in) on cushion
- Propulsion: 1 Rolls-Royce Gnome turbine engines 1,050 hp (780 kW) for lift and propulsion driving single four-bladed variable-pitch propeller
- Speed: 50 kn (93 km/h)
- Range: 170 miles at 30 knots
- Capacity: 58 seated passengers
- Crew: 3

The Saunders-Roe (later British Hovercraft Corporation) SR.N6 hovercraft (also known as the Winchester class) was essentially a larger version of the earlier SR.N5 series. It incorporated several features that resulted in the type becoming one of the most produced and commercially successful hovercraft designs in the world.

While the SR.N2 and SR.N5s operated in commercial service as trials craft, the SR.N6 has the distinction of being the first production hovercraft to enter commercial service. In comparison to the SR.N5, the SR.N6 was stretched in length, providing more than double the seating capacity. Some models of the craft were stretched further, enabling an even greater capacity.

Experience gained in the development of the SR.N6 has been attributed as heavily contributing towards the design and production of the largest civil hovercraft to be ever produced, the SR.N4. Several major design features of the SR.N6 appeared on both the SR.N4 and further hovercraft designs by Saunders-Roe and its successor, the British Hovercraft Corporation.

== Development ==
=== Origins ===
During the late 1950s and early 1960s, British inventor Christopher Cockerell had, in cooperation with British aerospace manufacturer Saunders-Roe, developed a pioneering new form of transportation. With public funding through the National Research Development Corporation the experimental SR.N1 vehicle proved the hovercraft concept by the end of the 1950s. By late 1964, Saunders-Roe had commenced design work on multiple hovercraft designs; in addition to the relatively huge SR.N4 and studies into a prospective 2,000 ton freighter, there was also interest in developing its existing smaller hovercraft range.

In particular, the company had observed there to be customer demand for a model of the SR.N5 that would be capable of carrying a much greater payload; there was a view that the existing craft was uneconomic for what payload it could carry and that an expanded, or 'stretched', model would be able to rectify this. According to Saunders-Roe's own projections, an increase of the craft's payload by 110 per cent would only reduce performance by 10 per cent as the increased payload was in part offset by the expanded cushion area, which meant that cushion pressure would not need to be substantially increased instead.

The first craft to be lengthened in this manner, in effect becoming the first SR.N6, was the ninth SR.N5 to have been produced. Following three months of work to adapt the craft to the new configuration, this first prototype was launched for the first time on 9 March 1965. Portions of the SR.N6's development were performed in conjunction with Hovertravel, a newly formed operating company located near Saunders-Roe's East Cowes facility. In June 1965, following an initial series of trials, the SR.N6 prototype was delivered to Scandinavian Hovercraft Promotions of Oslo, Norway under the name 'Scanhover'; it was followed by a second craft later that same month.

=== Further development ===
The SR.N6 had been designed in such a fashion that it could be extended from its initial 36 seat capacity to 58 without having to perform a major redesign or incurring high building costs. Work on the stretched SR.N6 was headed by Ray Wheeler, the chief designer of the British Hovercraft Corporation (BHC) - which Saunders-Roe had by then merged into. Many components and systems remained unchanged, including the relatively expensive Bristol Gnome turboshaft engine. Perhaps the most substantial change on the stretched craft, beyond the increased length, was the adoption of a twin-propeller configuration, which was done in order to reduce tip speed and thus noise.

The first SRN6 Mark 6 Twin Prop hovercraft, also known as "Super 6", was conversion of a SR.N6 Mark 1, that had been used by Hoverlloyd and Pacific Hovercraft. Extended by 9 ft 8 in and given two 10 ft diameter propellers, it launched in 1973. Hovertravel produced its first stretched SR.N6, achieved with engineering support from the BHC, by converting an existing damaged SR.N6 and two SR.N5s.

== Design ==
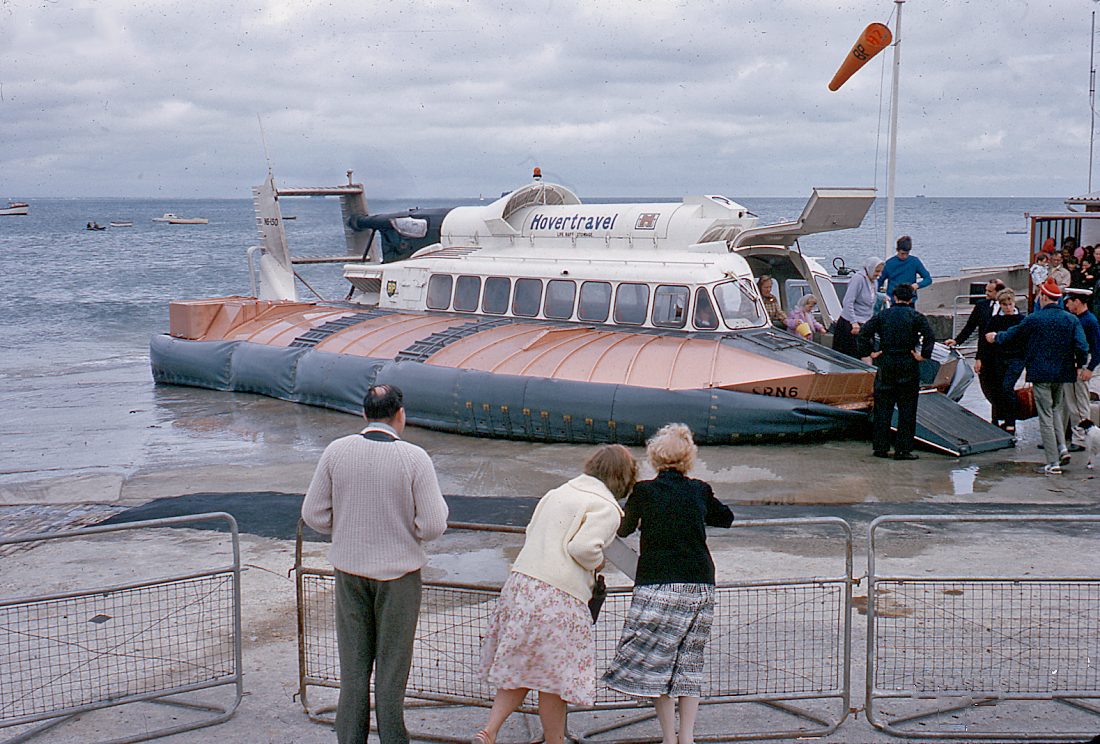
An SR.N6 at Ryde Pier, Isle of Wight, 1965

The Saunders-Roe SR.N6 (also known as the Winchester class) is a medium-sized hovercraft primarily designed for passenger service. The initial models of the type were capable of accommodating up to 38 passengers, which was greater than the maximum capacity of 18 that could be carried by the smaller SR.N5. The SR.N6 was subsequently further stretched to accommodate a further 20 passengers; this capacity upgrade let to it being considered to be more viable for commercial operations than any previous hovercraft design. By eventually increasing the capacity to 58 seats, the SR.N6 Mk.1S became the first hovercraft to be capable of transporting a typical coach load of people. In a military configuration, the SR.N6 is capable of carrying up to 55 fully equipped troops, or alternatively up to 6 tons of equipment.

The SR.N6 was powered by a single marinised model of the Bristol Gnome turboshaft engine; this drove both a single rear-facing 9 ft (2.74 m) diameter 4-bladed Dowty Rotol variable-pitch propeller along with a 7 ft (2.13 m) diameter centrifugal lift fan. The Gnome engine was an expensive component for operators, leading to some establishing their own internal overhaul facilities and making arrangements with other Gnome operators, including the Royal Navy, to reduce costs from relying on costly services from Rolls-Royce Limited. Around 20 per cent of the operating costs of the type have been attributed to maintenance of the 4 ft flexible skirt, which reportedly lasted for up to 500 hours, while similar cost levels have been reported for fuel.

Early on, the SR.N6 was outfitted with an improved skirt, featuring fingers and forward puff ports, which resulted in improved forward control and reduced skirt wear; fingers had not been present upon the initial version of the skirt used prior to 1966. The endurance of the fingers would be progressively improved over time, issues with salt spray negatively affecting both the engine and propeller were also encountered early on. An initial experience of some components having short overhaul lifespans or being unreliable was encountered during early days. During the early years of not only the SR.N6 but other hovercraft as well, the hovercraft skirt remained an unresolved area of difficulty during this era.

The SR.N6 was piloted from a forward-seated position at the front of the main passenger cabin. The pilot would exercise control over the direction of the craft via a series of control surfaces that was located immediately behind the variable pitch propeller. Early on, pilots were normally aviators who had been recruited from the Royal Air Force and Fleet Air Arm, however it has been claimed that experienced mariners would often be more skilled at operating the type, if not taking more time to adapt to its atypical form of propulsion, in part due to their familiarity at safely navigating within uncontrolled maritime environments. For navigation purposes, some SR.N6s were outfitted with onboard radar; multiple radar arrangements were used with the type, including pilots receiving radio guidance from on-shore radar operators in some circumstances.

== Operational history ==
=== Civilian use ===
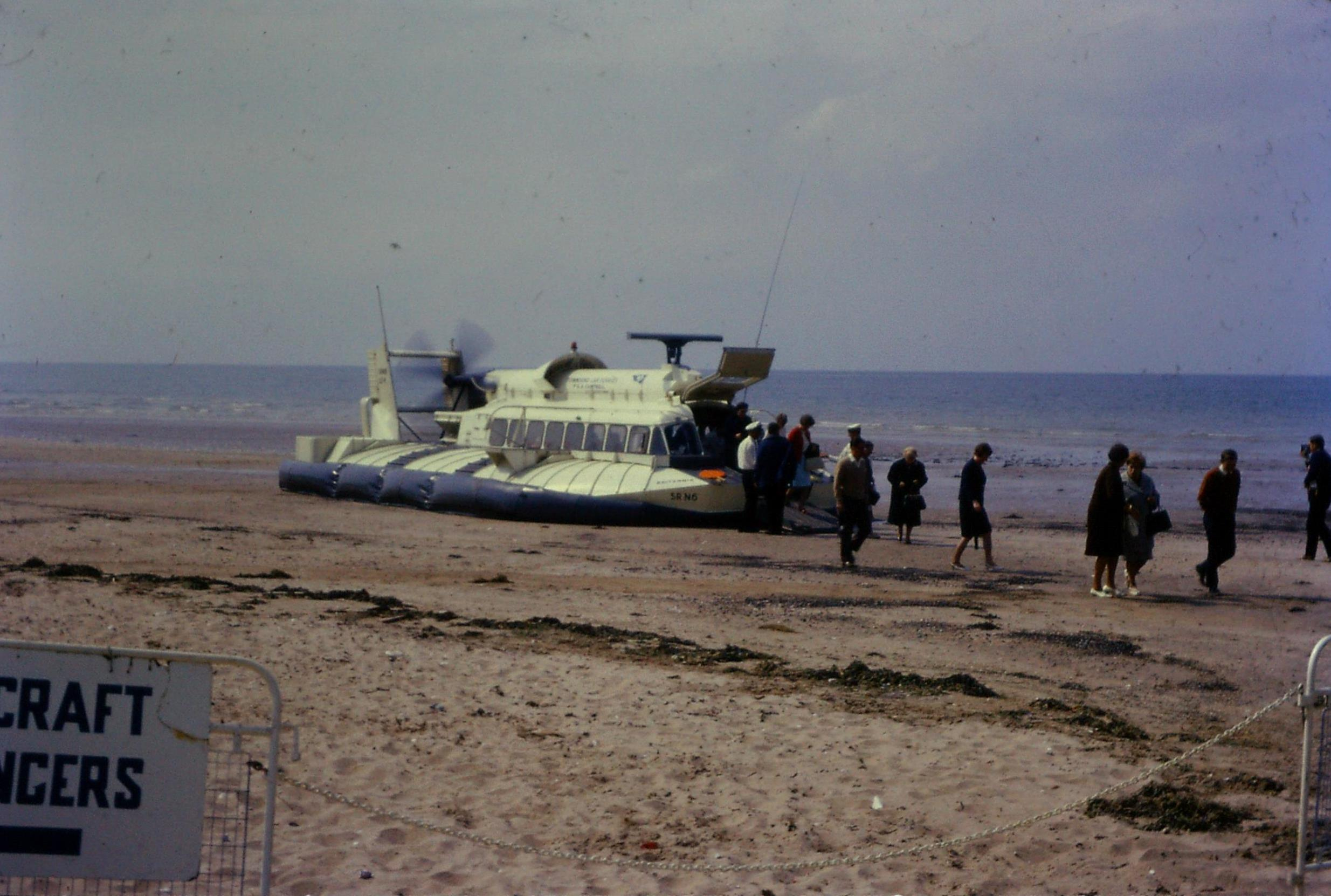
SR.N6-024 at Westgate Beach, Kent 1967

Norwegian operator Scanhover served as the SR.N6's launch customer. In June 1965, the first SR.N6 entered commercial service and was quickly joined by another craft. They operated on a 120-mile route, with six stopping points, in the Ålesund area. These craft were later operated between Aarhus and Kalundborg in Denmark and, during February and March 1966, also successfully underwent cold weather trials in Sweden, in the Gulf of Bothnia. The introduction of regular hovercraft services in the form of the SR.N6 attracted worldwide interest.

On 24 July 1965, British operator Hovertravel took delivery of its first SR.N6, placing it into service in the Solent area on a route between the Ryde Transport Interchange on the Isle of Wight and Southsea. This route was particularly well suited to hovercraft, as the tidal conditions of the surrounding coastline made berthing ships difficult, as well as a high volume of traffic; by 2012, Hovertravel had become the oldest hovercraft operator in the Western world, continuing to operate the same route.

British Rail, using the operating name of Seaspeed, started a hovercraft service using the SR.N6 across the Solent between Southampton and Cowes on the Isle of Wight in 1965. This was later taken over by Hovertravel. The service ended in 1980 because of rising costs and increased competition.

In 1966, operator P & A Campbell, in conjunction with Townsend Ferries, purchased SR.N6-024 to conduct a Townsend Car Ferries service, initially performing cross-Channel services between Dover and Calais. This service did not prove popular and was terminated after roughly two months. During 1966 and 1967, Campbell toured various holiday resorts across Great Britain, offering pleasure rides on the craft. SR.N6-024 was subsequently sold to Hovertravel, which soon deployed it on board the Cunard ocean liner RMS Sylvania in order to perform practical demonstrations in the Mediterranean to officials of various nations as well as some trips for passengers on board.

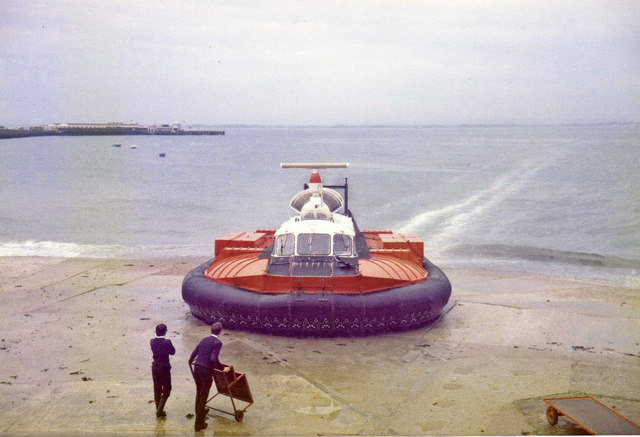
An SR.N6 landing at Ryde, Isle of Wight, 1980

In 1967, Hoverwork, a subsidiary of Hovertravel, operated a pair of SR.N6s at Expo 67, a World's fair held in Montreal, Canada, to provide passenger services between the exhibition site and Montreal itself. In 1968, a single Hoverwork SR.N6 traversed a 2,400 km route of inhospitable jungle terrain within central South America, between Manaus, Brazil and Port of Spain, Trinidad, for a National Geographic scientific expedition. Between Hoverwork and Hovertravel, a fleet of up to nine SR.N6s was employed on both scheduled and chartered operations around the world.

Prior to its introduction of the far-larger SR.N4 ('Mountbatten'-class), British Rail's hovercraft operating division, named Seaspeed, decided to adopt a pair of SR.N6s for route proving and information gathering purposes. In October 1966, Charles Brindle and several engineers surveyed several potential sites on both the British and French sides of the English Channel, using an SR.N6 to determine their suitability for the future SR.N4 service. In late 1971, the company stretched its SR.N6 to the larger Mk 1S standard and fitted more powerful Gnome engines to account for the increased payload. However, in the long term, it was determined by Seaspeed that the SR.N6 could not be profitable on the Cowes-Southampton route to which it had tasked the type. One of the Seaspeed SR.N6 Mk1s hovercraft is now on display at The Hovercraft Museum, Lee-on-the-Solent.

During the late 1960s, Hoverlloyd also launched a cross-Channel service using a pair of SR.N6s, running four return trips per day. Like Seaspeed, Hoverlloyd used its SR.N6 fleet to gain experience prior to its own acquisition of the larger SR.N4.

In 1968, a single SR.N6 traversed around 8,000 km (4,970 mi) through western equatorial Africa during the British Trans-African Hovercraft Expedition, the longest hovercraft expedition ever conducted.

=== Military use ===
Military variants have seen service with the Italian Navy, Egyptian Navy, Iraqi Navy (Mk.6C), Iranian Navy, and the Saudi Arabian Frontier Force.

The Boat Company of the Royal Brunei Malay Regiment (forerunner of the Royal Brunei Navy) operated an SR.N6 from 1968.

The British Royal Navy operated a SR.N6 XV589 alongside The Royal Marines in the Falkland Islands in the late 1960s and early 1970s to evaluate them for use in remote regions. A. Cecil Hampshire writes that Naval Party 8902 was established with a strength of ten to use an SR.N6 in June 1967. The British Army under the Royal Corps of Transport had 200 Hovercraft Trials Squadron at Lee-on-Solent and Browndown formed in 1966 and disbanded in 1974. Two SR.N6s (P236 & 237), operated by Navy Party 1009, were deployed in Hong Kong for three years to assist with anti illegal immigration work. Both craft had previously served for 16 years with the Fleet Air Arm as part of the Hovercraft Trials Unit, HMS Daedalus. The unit returned to Britain in September 1982.

The Iraqi Navy operated its fleet of six SR.N6s as patrol vehicles along Iraq's contested border with Iran, and were used during the Iran–Iraq War.

The North Korean Kongbang-class hovercraft is derived from the SR.N6. Currently the North Korean Navy fields 130 such hovercraft.

In 1998, the Canadian Coast Guard decommissioned its last SR.N6, CCGH 045, that was in active service.

== Variants ==
- SR.N6 Mark 1
- SR.N6 Mark 1s - stretched version (sole remaining example on display at The Hovercraft Museum, Lee-on-the-Solent)
- SR.N6 Mark 2 - military logistic support, with roof loading hatch and strengthened side decks for loads. Used by Iranian and Egyptian navies
- SR.N6 Mark 3 - military logistic support
- SR.N6 Mark 4
- SR.N6 Mark 5 - well deck variant (sole remaining example on display at The Hovercraft Museum, Lee-on-the-Solent)
- SR.N6 Mark 6 - Twin propeller (prototype on display at The Hovercraft Museum, Lee-on-the-Solent)

== Accidents and incidents ==
On 4 March 1972, SRN6-012 of Hovertravel capsized in the Solent whilst on a flight from Ryde, Isle of Wight to Southsea, Hampshire. Five of the 27 people on board were killed.

Just after midnight on 29 February 1980, a collision involving Royal Navy hovercraft P237 and a Chinese gunboat occurred in Deep Bay, Hong Kong leading to the injury of three Chinese crewmen on the gunboat. Armed Chinese guards immediately boarded the immobilised hovercraft and a stand-off lasting most of the following day ensued. After agreeing to exchange the respective commanders' versions of events, both parties withdrew from the scene. P237 was written off in 1982 after hitting a rock while in pursuit of a speedboat.

== Merchandise ==
The SR.N6 has been the subject of two popular toy versions. A small metal replica was produced for over 20 years by Matchbox Toys, while a much larger die-cast version was produced in the 1970s by Dinky Toys. A 12.7 cm model was released by Matchbox in 1974 as part of its Super Kings range.

== Specifications ==
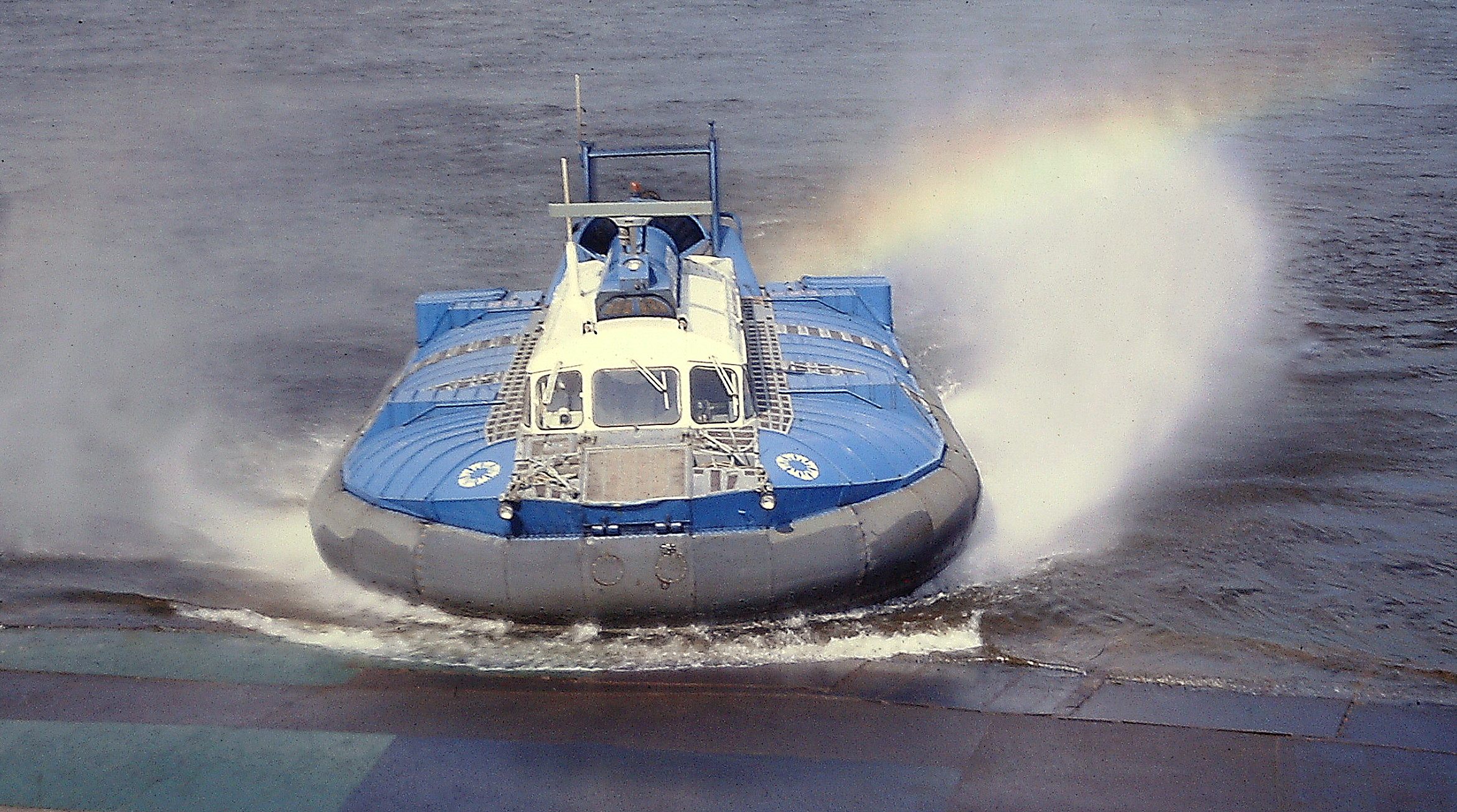
Head-on view of a SR.N6

- SR.N6 Mk. 1S Winchester Class - SR.N6 Mk 8 (in production)
- Manufacturer: Saunders-Roe, (later British Hovercraft Corporation)
- Crew 3
- Dimensions
  - Length 17.78 metres
  - Width 7.97 metres
  - Height (on cushion) 6.32 meters
  - full load displacement 10.9 tons
- Propulsion
  - 1 Rolls-Royce Gnome turbine engine 1,050 horsepower for lift and propulsion driving single four-bladed Dowty Rotol variable-pitch propeller
- Performance
  - Speed 50 knots
  - Range 170 miles at 30 knots
  - Military lift: 55 fully equipped troops or 6 tons of equipment
- Weapons
  - Either a ring-mounted machine gun (0.5 in or 7.62 mm) or short range wire guided surface-to-surface missiles mounted on the side decks.
