= Pegwell Bay =

Bay on the coast of Kent, UK

Coordinates: 51°18′N 1°23′E

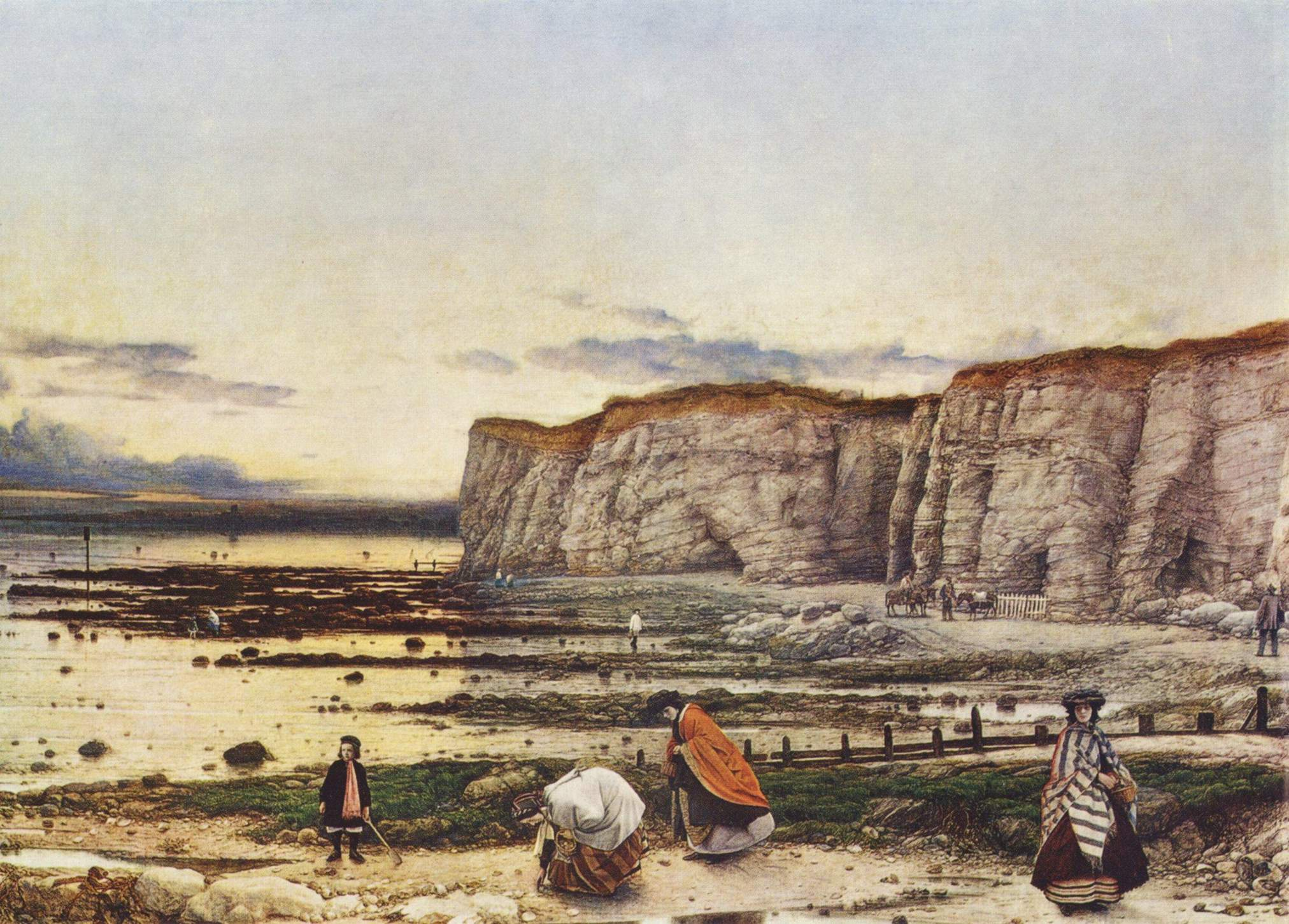
Pegwell Bay, Kent – a Recollection of October 5th 1858, by William Dyce

Pegwell Bay is a shallow inlet in the English Channel coast astride the estuary of the River Stour north of Sandwich Bay, between Ramsgate and Sandwich in Kent. Part of the bay is a nature reserve, with seashore habitats including mudflats and salt marsh with migrating waders and wildfowl. The public can access the nature reserve via Pegwell Bay Country Park, which is off the A256 Ramsgate to Dover road.

== History ==
Archaeologists suggest that Pegwell Bay was the landing site for both Roman invasions of Britain by Julius Caesar. In 2017 the University of Leicester excavated a large fort dating from 54 BC; it was the previous lack of such evidence that had prevented historians from fixing the exact site of Caesar's landing.

Pegwell Bay as it was in 1858 is recorded in a much-reproduced landscape painting by William Dyce, now in the Tate Gallery: Pegwell Bay, Kent – a Recollection of October 5th 1858.

A pleasure pier was built in the 19th century in an effort to establish a seaside resort to rival nearby Ramsgate. This was not a success however, and was dismantled before the end of the century.

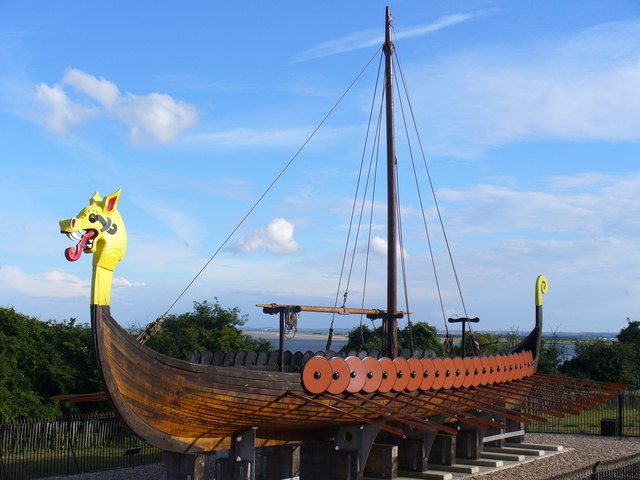
This replica Viking ship is in the Country Park. It is supposed to be a replica of the "Hugin".

A full-size replica Scandinavian longboat complete with shields is situated by the main road on the low clifftops above Pegwell Bay to commemorate the first Anglo-Saxon landings in England hereabouts. The replica, named Hugin, sailed from Denmark to Thanet in 1949 to celebrate the 1,500th anniversary of the Anglo-Saxon invasion of Britain, the traditional landing of Hengist and Horsa, and the betrothal of Hengist's daughter, Rowena to Vortigern, King of the Britons. Out of 53 crewmen only the navigator, Peter Jensen, was a professional seaman. Historic conditions were faithfully observed but with the addition of a sextant. The Hugin was offered as a gift to Ramsgate and Broadstairs by the Daily Mail in order for it to be preserved for centuries. The ship underwent extensive restoration in 2004–5.

Nearby Ebbsfleet is the site of the landing of the first Christian mission to southern England, by St Augustine, in 597 AD, commemorated by St Augustine's Cross.

The Bay has treacherous bogs at low tide amongst the otherwise firm sands. These are used as plot points in Dennis Wheatley's 1938 thriller, Contraband. The attached map of Kent in the book shows two of the heroes in difficulties at Pegwell Bay.

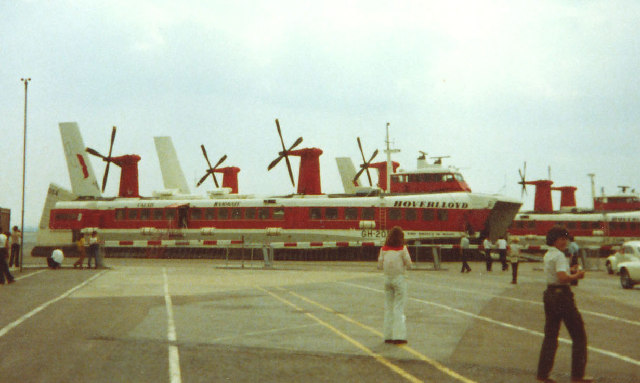
July 1980. Pegwell Bay Hoverport, Ramsgate. Hoverlloyd hovercraft 'The Prince of Wales' prior to departure for Calais, France.

== Hoverport ==
At the north east corner of the bay are the remains of Hoverlloyd's cross-channel Ramsgate Hoverport. Vehicle and passenger carrying hovercraft operated from here from 1969 until 1982. For a time, the hoverport was used as an administrative and engineering base by Hoverspeed after all passenger services had ceased. However, the former activity moved to Dover in October 1985 and the latter (mainly used for craft overhauls) in late December 1987 with the buildings demolished in 1992. The hovercraft pad, car-marshalling area and approach road are the sole identifiable features that remain at the site.

== Premises ==
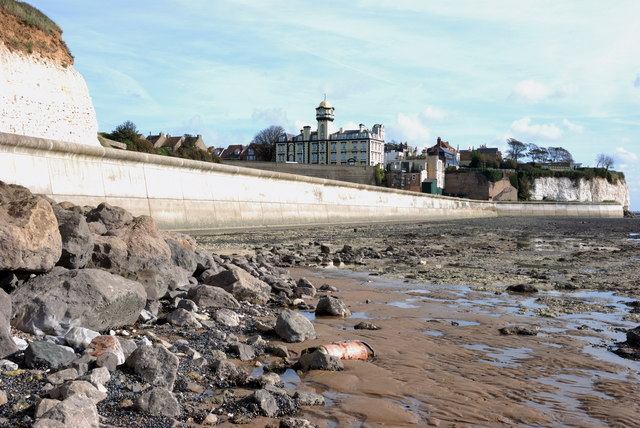
View of the Pegwell Bay Hotel from the beach

The Belle Vue Tavern was constructed around 1797, and became known for its seafood.

The Pegwell Bay Hotel is a Grade II listed hotel complex in the village centre. It was constructed in the mid 19th century by James Tatnell, and opened as Tantell's Hotel. The hotel consists of three storeys and an attic, with a tower and belfry in the centre.

== See also ==
- Julius Caesar's invasions of Britain
