= Hovercraft Museum =

- View through the gate at The Hovercraft Museum in 2020
- Established: 1988
- Location: Daedalus, Broom Way, Lee-on-the-Solent, PO13 9YA, England
- Coordinates: 50°48′27″N 1°12′36″W
- Type: Maritime museum
- Collection size: 60 full size craft Hovercraft archive and library
- Website: www.hovercraft-museum.org

The Hovercraft Museum is a museum located in Lee-on-the-Solent, Hampshire, England, run by a registered charity dedicated to hovercraft.

== Description ==
Situated adjacent to Solent Airport Daedalus, the Museum sits by the large slipway from where many hovercraft have been tested.

== History ==
The museum reopened in January 2016 after being closed for essential structural building work for nearly two years. Shortly afterwards the remaining SR.N4 craft came under threat of scrapping when the site owners, the Homes and Communities Agency, proposed the redevelopment of the land. The museum trust started a petition calling for one of the craft to be preserved.

In October 2023 the Hovercraft Museum achieved Arts Council England Accreditation, joining more than 1700 museums also taking part in the scheme.

== Collection ==
The museum has a collection of over 60 hovercraft of various designs. Craft within the collection include:

- The Princess Anne, the last remaining SR.N4 hovercraft, the world's largest civil hovercraft, which has been laid up in Lee-on-the-Solent since cross-Channel services ceased on 1 October 2000. She is part of the The National Register of Historic Vessels.
- BH7, a BH.7 Mk2 hovercraft. She is part of the The National Register of Historic Vessels.
- The Twin Prop, an SR.N6 Mk6 hovercraft. She is part of the The National Register of Historic Vessels.
- Sea Hawk, an SR.N6 Mk1S hovercraft. She is part of the The National Register of Historic Vessels.
- SR.N6 Mk5 Welldeck hovercraft.
- Griffon 2000TDX Royal Marines hovercraft.
- Cushioncraft CC7 'whispering' hovercraft.
- Marineswift hovercraft.
- An SR.N5 hovercraft, the last remaining British built SRN5 in the UK. She is part of the The National Register of Historic Vessels.
- The Hoverover, a Canadian hovercraft.
- Skima 12, a hovercraft previously owned by the Sultan of Oman.
- Various Pindair Skima inflatable hovercraft.
- HD2, a development hovercraft.
- Decider, a development hovercraft built by Vosper Hovermarine.
- Air Lubricat 5, a recreational hovercraft.
- Aeropacer, a Jersey-built recreational hovercraft.
- J4 a Jersey-built recreational hovercraft, which held the Guinness World Record for the fastest crossing from France to Jersey and back in 1969.
- Hoverlark, a recreational hovercraft.
- Hoverhawk, a recreational hovercraft.
- Two hovercraft made for an episode of Scrapheap Challenge.
- Mini Hover, a recreational hovercraft based on a Mini car.
- An Australian Hoverboard.
- Two hovercraft from the James Bond film, Die Another Day.
- The cockpit from The Princess Margaret SR.N4 hovercraft.
- The cockpit from Swift SR.N4 hovercraft.
- The cockpit from Sir Christopher SR.N4 hovercraft.

The museum houses the world's largest library of documents, publications, film, video, photographs and drawings on hovercraft, all of which is available for research by prior arrangement. A number of hovercraft manufacturers have deposited their complete archives with the museum for safekeeping, thus swelling this important repository of information.

The museum also contains a large collection of original manufacturers' hovercraft models including the world's first working hovercraft model built by Christopher Cockerell.
