= CCGS Waban-Aki =

Canadian Coast Guard hovercraft

History

Canada
- Name: Waban-Aki
- Operator: Canadian Coast Guard
- Port of registry: Ottawa, Ontario
- Builder: British Hovercraft Corporation, East Cowes, England
- Yard number: AP1-88
- Launched: 1987
- Commissioned: 15 July 1987
- Decommissioned: 2010
- Homeport: CCG Hovercraft Base Trois-Rivières, Trois-Rivières-Ouest, Quebec - Quebec Region
- Identification: CH-CGC
- Status: Out of service

General characteristics
- Type: BHC AP1-88 hovercraft
- Displacement: 48.4 t (47.6 long tons)
- Length: 24.5 m (80 ft 5 in)
- Beam: 11.2 m (36 ft 9 in)
- Propulsion: 4 × Deutz BF 12L513 1760 kW turboprops
- Speed: 50 knots (93 km/h; 58 mph) maximum
- Complement: 4

CCGS Waban-Aki was a Canadian Coast Guard hovercraft based at CCG Hovercraft Base Trois-Rivières in Trois-Rivières, Quebec. It was a Type 200 AP1-88 air-cushioned vehicle (ACV) and sister ship to CCGS Sipu Muin. Its name is derived from the First Nations term Wabanaki meaning "people of the dawn". The hovercraft decommissioned in 2010 and was replaced by CCGS Mamilossa. The primary missions of Waban-Aki were icebreaking and performing search and rescue missions in the Saint Lawrence River and its navigable tributaries. Occasionally Waban-Aki performed navigation aid maintenance.

== Description ==
Designated Type 200 by the Canadian Coast Guard (CCG), Waban-Aki was a AP1-88 ACV hovercraft that had a light displacement of 48.4 t (47.6 long tons) and measured 24.5 metres (80 ft 5 in) long with a beam of 11.2 m (36 ft 9 in). The vessel's height with the air cushion inflated was 6.6 m (21 ft 8 in). Waban-Aki was powered by four Deutz diesel engines creating 1.6 megawatts (2,100 hp) giving the hovercraft a maximum speed of 50 knots (93 km/h; 58 mph) and 35 knots (65 km/h; 40 mph) cruising speed. The vessel was crewed by four personnel including three officers.

== Construction and career ==
After developing operational experience with Voyageur, a prototype hovercraft in service with the CCG, on the Saint Lawrence River the CCG sought to replace the aging hovercraft in 1985. In 1986, the British Hovercraft Corporation offered a variant of its AP.1-88 passenger ferry hovercraft design to Canada which was accepted and construction started at Cowes, England. The vessel was launched and completed in mid 1987. The vessel was commissioned into the CCG on 15 July 1987 as Waban-Aki, a First Nations term meaning "people of the dawn". The hovercraft underwent sea trials before arriving in Montreal, Quebec in August 1987 and began operations in October. Waban-Aki was homeported at CCG Hovercraft Base Trois-Rivières, Trois-Rivières-Ouest, Quebec - Quebec Region and given the identifier CH-CGC.

Due to the high volume of shipping in the Canadian Saint Lawrence and the requirement to keep the shipping lanes open year round, CCG hovercraft in Eastern Canada are primarily tasked with icebreaking, with secondary tasks such as performing search and rescue missions and navigation aid maintenance. Waban-Aki performed these duties for 22 years before being taken out of service and being replaced by CCGS Mamilossa in 2009.

== See also ==
- CCGS Moytel
- CCGS Penac
- CCGS Siyay
