= CCGS Penac =

Former Canadian Coastguard hovercraft based in British Columbia

History

Canada
- Name: Penac
- Namesake: Penac means "fair winds" in the Saanich language
- Operator: Canadian Coast Guard
- Port of registry: Ottawa, Ontario
- Builder: British Hovercraft Corporation, Cowes, England
- Yard number: 820572
- Launched: 1984
- Acquired: 2004
- Commissioned: 2004
- Decommissioned: 2017
- Homeport: CCG Hovercraft Base Richmond, BC - Pacific Region
- Identification: MMSI number: 316004943; Callsign: CH-CCH
- Status: Decommissioned

General characteristics
- Type: BHC AP1-88/BHT-130 hovercraft
- Tonnage: 456 NT
- Length: 25.4 m (83 ft 4 in)
- Beam: 11.2 m (36 ft 9 in)
- Propulsion: 2 × Deutz BF 12L513 diesel engines
- Speed: 45 knots (83 km/h; 52 mph) maximum
- Endurance: 1 day
- Complement: 7

CCGS Penac was a Canadian Coast Guard AP1-88/100 air cushioned vehicle (ACV) or hovercraft and was based at CCG Hovercraft Base Richmond, British Columbia. The primary missions of Penac was search and rescue off the British Columbia Coast. The vessel was initially constructed in 1984 by the British Hovercraft Corporation for use as a passenger vessel in Copenhagen, Denmark as Lommen with Scandinavian Airlines (abbreviated SAS in the livery) and renamed Liv Viking just before the service began. Sold in 1997 after a bridge eliminated the vessel's need, the hovercraft was sold to Hovertravel for service on the Solent. However, the ACV never entered service and was acquired by the Canadian Coast Guard in 2004. Renamed Penac, the hovercraft remained in service until 2017.

== Description ==
Penac was a BHC AP1-88/BHT-130 hovercraft, later designated by the Canadian Coast Guard as Type 100. In civilian service the vessel was initially constructed of marine grade aluminium powered by four Deutz air-cooled marine diesel engines, using two for lift and two for propulsion. This design provided lower servicing costs than the gas turbines usually installed on ACVs as well as lower noise pollution. In a ferry role, the hovercraft measured 24.5 metres (80 ft 5 in) long with a beam of 11 m (36 ft 1 in) with capacity for 81 passengers with their luggage carried in containers to either side of the cabin. Passenger access was through a door to the rear of the superstructure.

After reconstruction for the Canadian Coast Guard the ACV measured 25.4 m (83 ft 4 in) long with a beam of 11.2 m (36 ft 9 in) and constructed of aluminium. Penac had a fully loaded displacement of 46.2 t (45.5 long tons) and was assessed at 456 net tonnage (NT). The hovercraft was powered by two Deutz BF 12L513 diesel engines creating 785 kilowatts (1,053 hp) and two MTU 12V 183TB32 diesels creating 1.25 megawatts (1,680 hp) sustained turning two controllable pitch propellers and bow thrusters. This gave the vessel an initial maximum speed of 50 knots (93 km/h; 58 mph), though this was later reduced to 45 knots (83 km/h; 52 mph) with a cruising speed of 35 knots (65 km/h; 40 mph). Penac had a cruising range of 200 nautical miles (370 km; 230 mi) and could stay at sea for one day. The vessel was crewed by seven, including two officers.

== History ==
Constructed for passenger service by the British Hovercraft Corporation at Cowes, England in 1984, the vessel was originally named Lommen for service by Scandinavian Airlines between Copenhagen Airport, Denmark and Malmö, Sweden. The ACV made the journey from England to Denmark under its own power taking five days. To maintain the hovercraft, a 1,845 m^{2} (19,860 sq ft) facility was constructed at Malmö adjoining a quay with a floating pontoon for docking. The facility was granted the status of an international airport. Lommen was renamed Liv Viking just before the hovercraft service began on 14 June. The hovercraft began developing mechanical problems soon after entering service, resulting in their pull from service for six weeks while the issue was sorted. The 1984/1985 winter was one of the coldest suffered by the region leading to Øresund freezing over and preventing other fast ferries from operating. The hovercraft, capable of travelling over ice, continued in service.

However, the hovercraft was no longer needed after the opening of the Øresund Bridge, and the ACV was taken out of service and laid up for three years. Liv Viking was sold to Hovertravel in mid-1997 for service on the Solent. The vessel never saw service for Hovertravel and was instead sold on to Canada.

After being purchased by the Government of Canada in 2004 Liv Viking underwent a significant refit completed by Hoverwork Ltd. on the Isle of Wight, England and rebuilt to Canadian Coast Guard specifications. The ACV was renamed Penac, which means "fair winds" in the language of the Saanich people. Penac was based at CCG Hovercraft Base Richmond, British Columbia - Pacific Region and entered service with the Canadian Coast Guard in 2004. The ACV used primarily for search and rescue on the British Columbia Coast. In 2010, Penac was deployed to rescue the crew and passengers of a sailboat that was sinking due to adverse weather conditions. The hovercraft rescued four people from the water but suffered significant damage to its skirt.

Penac was replaced by the newer CCGS Moytel. Penac's lack of facilities lead to the vessel's replacement as the Canadian Coast Guard sought a more versatile ACV. Penac's lack of versatility was brought to the fore when the other, larger, ACV assigned to British Columbia, CCGS Siyay, was sidelined for nearly a year in 2015–2016 due to a refit. Penac was taken out of service in early 2017, renamed Hovercraft 2017-01 and awaiting disposal. The vessel was posted for sale in 2019 and sold to Gino Leblanc and Theo Gene Albert of Caraquet, New Brunswick-based Northeast Diving Ltd. In early 2023, the vessel was transported by cargo ship from British Columbia through the Panama Canal to Fort Lauderdale, Florida. Then it began its journey from Florida to New Brunswick under its own power. On 17 June 2023, the hovercraft was deliberately run ashore in Hampton Beach, New Hampshire, after a 0.91-metre (3 ft) tear developed in the vessel's skirt while travelling from Cape Cod to Nova Scotia. The craft was later repaired and had set off for Portland, Maine en route to Nova Scotia. In late June 2023, Penac completed its journey to Caraquet, New Brunswick.

== See also ==
- CCGS Mamilossa
- CCGS Sipu Muin
- List of equipment of the Canadian Coast Guard
