= SRN =

SRN or Srn may refer to:

- SR.N (Saunders-Roe Nautical), a series of hovercraft produced by Saunders-Roe:
  - SR.N1, the first modern hovercraft
  - SR.N2, the first hovercraft to operate a commercial service
  - SR.N3, the first hovercraft designed for military use
  - SR.N4, a large four-prop ferry hovercraft
  - SR.N5, a river patrol hovercraft used in Vietnam
  - SR.N6, a longer SR.N5
- SRN1 mechanism, a radical-nucleophilic aromatic substitution in organic chemistry
- Salem Radio Network, a United States-based Christian radio network
- Scottish Recovery Network, an initiative designed to raise awareness of recovery from mental disorders
- Simple recurrent network, a type of recurrent neural network
- Sranan Tongo, a Creole language, ISN-639 code
- A state registered nurse in the United Kingdom
- Union of the Russian People (Soyuz Russkogo Naroda), a Black-Hundredist political organization in the Russian Empire, c. 1905–1917
- Strahan Airport, IATA airport code "SRN"
- SRN, ICAO code for SprintAir, a Polish airline
