= Hoverwork BHT130 =

Large hovercraft

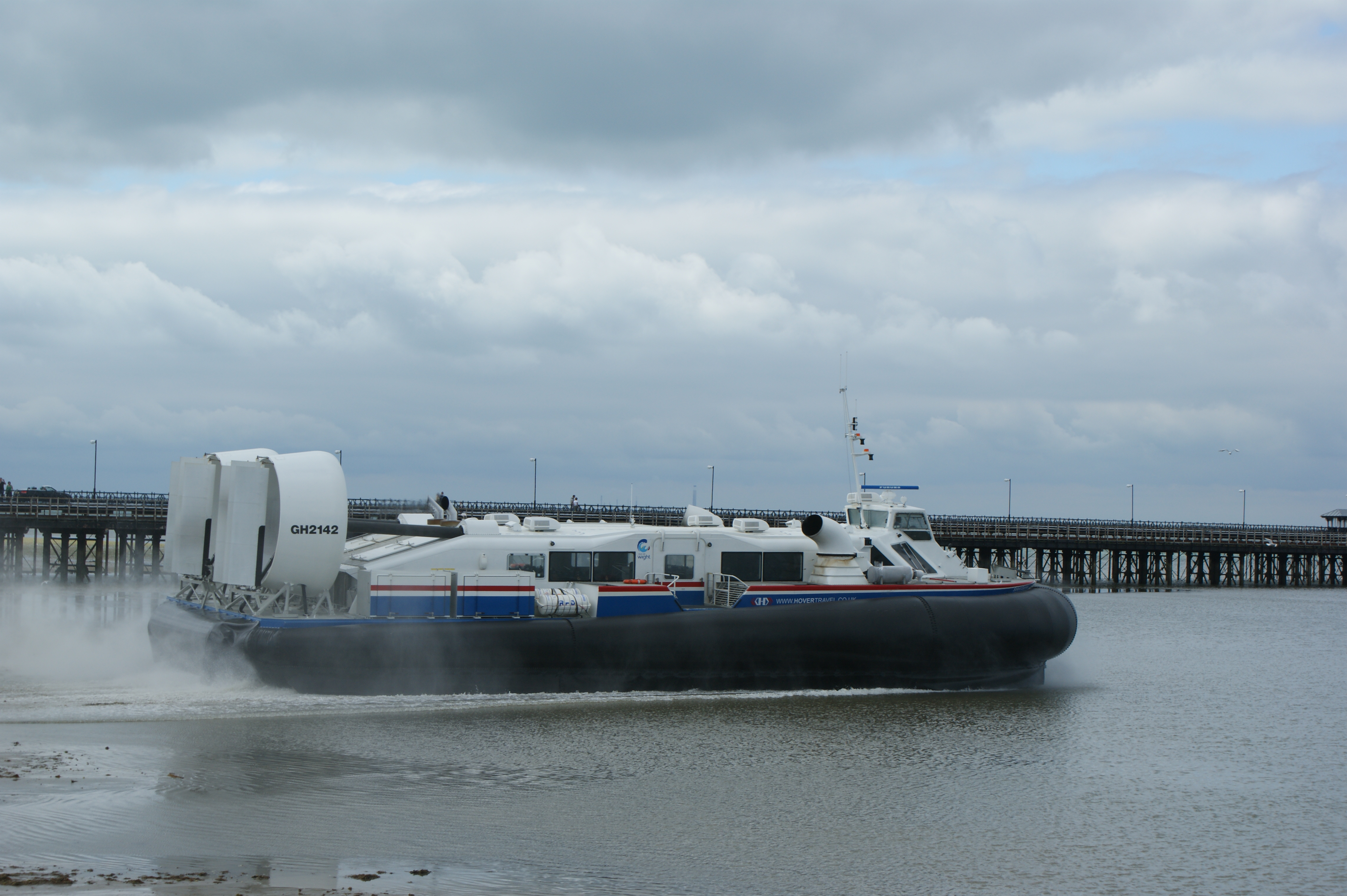
- The Solent Express leaving Ryde

Class overview
- Name: BHT 130 Class
- Builders: Hoverwork
- Operators: Hovertravel
- Built: 2005-2006
- Completed: 2
- Active: 2

General characteristics
- Type: hovercraft
- Tonnage: 70 tonne all up weight
- Length: 29.3 m long
- Beam: 15 m beam
- Propulsion: 2 x MTU 12V2000-R1237K37 diesels - each producing 675kW for lift, 2 x MTU 16V2000-R1637K37 diesels for propulsion producing 899kW, powering 2 x 3.5-metre-diameter, five-bladed, variable-pitch propellers for propulsion
- Speed: Service speed 45 knots
- Capacity: Maximum 133 passengers
- Crew: 4

The Griffon Hoverwork BHT130 is a large hovercraft, designed by Hoverwork and fitted out in St Helens.

The reference to “BHT” in the name of the class stands for British Hovercraft Technologies.

== Development ==
The BHT130 series was designed to replace the British Hovercraft Corporation AP1-88 series craft in operation at the time by Hoverwork's sister company; Hovertravel. The class was designed to be quieter, smoother and provide a larger capacity.

== Design ==
The BHT130 is a medium-sized hovercraft design, which was designed to follow many of the design principles set by its predecessor craft; the AP1-88. These were a central elevated cockpit, bilateral bow thrusters, ducted rear propellers and diesel engine power.

As a civil passenger hovercraft it seats up to 130 passengers, hence the numerics in its name, the first welded aluminium hull (fabricated by Aluminium Ship Builders, Fishbourne, Isle of Wight) arrived at Hoverwork's St Helens works in August 2005.

== Operational history ==
The first of its kind, named the Solent Express entered cross-Solent service on 14 June 2007; also, in the July of the same year, it was put on trial at a new passenger service between Kirkcaldy and Portobello across the Firth of Forth in Scotland. It remained in service on the Solent until 2011 when it was sold to Griffon Hoverwork Ltd and laid up pending sale.

The type was found to be too large for the cross-Solent route and was withdrawn after 4 years in service (2007-2011), although other BHT variants are found currently in service around the world in various commercial and civil roles and designated as BHT 130/150/180.

Solent Express was sold in April 2026 by Griffon Marine to Caspian Offshore Construction as Caspian Eagle to join her sister Caspian Falcon ex-Suna-X.

== Technical specifications ==
- 29.3 m long
- 15 m beam
- 70 tonne all up weight
- Service speed over water 45 knots
- 130 passengers
- 4 crew
- Lift engines - 2 x MTU 12V2000-R1237K37 diesels - each producing 675kW
- Propulsion engines - 2 x MTU 16V2000-R1637K37 diesels producing 899kW
- 2 x 3.5-metre-diameter, five-bladed, variable-pitch propellers for propulsion
