= CCGS Mamilossa =

Canadian Coast Guard hovercraft

History

Canada
- Name: Mamilossa
- Namesake: Abenaki for it walks from the shore onto the water
- Operator: Canadian Coast Guard
- Port of registry: Ottawa, Ontario
- Builder: Hoverworks Limited, Cowes, England
- Yard number: 833290
- Launched: 2008
- In service: 2009–present
- Home port: CCG Hovercraft Base Trois-Rivières - Quebec Region
- Identification: MMSI number: 316013639; Callsign: CFN5305
- Status: Ship in active service

General characteristics
- Type: Griffon Hoverwork AP1-88/400 hovercraft
- Tonnage: 70 NT
- Length: 28.5 m (93 ft 6 in)
- Beam: 12 m (39 ft 4 in)
- Installed power: 3,356 kW (4,500 hp)
- Propulsion: 4 × Caterpillar C32 twelve-cylinder diesel engines
- Speed: 50 knots (93 km/h; 58 mph) maximum
- Range: 400 nmi (740 km; 460 mi) at 45 knots (83 km/h; 52 mph)
- Complement: 8

CCGS Mamilossa is a Canadian Coast Guard Hoverwork AP1-88/400 air cushioned vehicle or hovercraft based at CCG Hovercraft Base Trois-Rivières, Quebec. The first of three hovercraft of the AP1-88/400 design ordered by the Canadian Coast Guard, Mamilossa was the only one constructed in the United Kingdom by Hoverworks Ltd. with the remaining units, CCGS Sipu Muin and CCGS Siyay, built under license by Hike Metal Products of Wheatley, Ontario, Canada. Mamilossa is the largest hovercraft exported by British shipbuilders and was launched in 2008. The hovercraft's name is Abenaki for "it walks from the shore onto the water fair winds". The hovercraft entered service in 2009.

The primary missions of Mamilossa are icebreaking and search and rescue along coastlines in the Quebec Region. The vessel can perform secondary tasks, such as navigational aid work and use as a buoy tender.

== Design and description ==
Mamilossa is a AP1-88/400 air cushioned vehicle (ACV) constructed of aluminium with a length of 28.5 metres (93 ft 6 in) and a beam of 12 metres (39 ft 4 in). The hovercraft was measured at 70 net tonnage (NT). Mamilossa is propelled by two controllable pitch propellers powered by four Caterpillar C32 twelve-cylinder geared diesel engines creating 3,356 kilowatts (4,500 hp). The ACV has a maximum speed of 50 knots (93 km/h; 58 mph) and a range of 400 nautical miles (740 km; 460 mi) at 45 knots (83 km/h; 52 mph). Mamilossa is equipped with a Palfinger 650002 marine hydraulic knuckle crane with 12 m (39 ft) outreach capable of lifting 6.6 metric tons (6.5 long tons; 7.3 short tons). The ACV has a crew of eight including four officers.

== Construction and career ==
Mamilossa was built by Hoverworks Ltd. at their yard in Cowes, England. The vessel was launched in 2008 and underwent trials off the Isle of Wight. Mamilossa, which means "it walks from the shore onto the water fair winds" in the Abenaki language, entered service in 2009 with the Canadian Coast Guard and provides icebreaking, search and rescue, and navigational aid maintenance. The vessel is based at CCG Hovercraft Base Trois-Rivières, Quebec. As part of the Canadian Coast Guard's fleet renewal plan, the acquisition of four new ACVs was announced to replace Mamilossa and the other hovercraft.

== See also ==
- CCGS Moytel
- CCGS Penac
- List of equipment of the Canadian Coast Guard
