= Scottish Recovery Indicator =

Mental health service development tool

The Scottish Recovery Indicator (SRI) is a mental health service development tool.

This tool has been designed by the Scottish Recovery Network to help mental health services ensure that their activities are focused on supporting the recovery of the people who use their services. The original tool which was launched in 2007 and was later reviewed and simplified being relaunched in 2011 as SRI 2.

SRI 2 is a framework and a process. The framework consists of a set of reflective statements centred on ten recovery indicators. These recovery indicators are based on research about what works in recovery e.g. ‘service is strengths based’ and ‘goals are identified and addressed’. The service reflects on its practice by considering data from six sources.

Assessments, care plans and service information provide documentary evidence of recovery orientation from three data sources. The three other data sets are the result of reflective conversations with the people who provide the service, the people who use the service and, where possible, their carers.

The SRI 2 website and associated guidance supports the service through the preparatory and information gathering stages. Guidance on what sort of evidence to look for is also made available. Data collections sheets are printed from the SRI 2 website which also records the scores and comments that have been gathered.

The practitioners meet and discuss the scores and comments and devise an action plan. This might involve for example ‘being more explicit about strengths based practice in the assessment paperwork’. The service then implements the actions identified and records these in their SRI 2 website account. That then is one cycle of SRI 2 complete. The service can follow this up with another SRI 2 and build on the improvements.

SRI2 is no longer supported and the website has closed down.
