= Agrilus subcinctus =

Scientific classification
- Kingdom: Animalia
- Phylum: Arthropoda
- Clade: Pancrustacea
- Class: Insecta
- Order: Coleoptera
- Suborder: Polyphaga
- Infraorder: Elateriformia
- Family: Buprestidae
- Genus: Agrilus
- Species: A. subcinctus

Binomial name
- Agrilus subcinctus Gory, 1841

Species of beetle

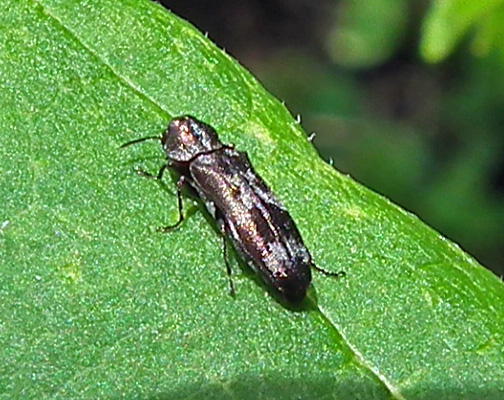
Agrilus subcinctus, Wheatley, Ontario, Canada

Agrilus subcinctus, the native ash borer, is a species of metallic wood-boring beetle in the family Buprestidae. It is found in North America.
