= CCGS Sipu Muin =

Canadian Coast Guard hovercraft

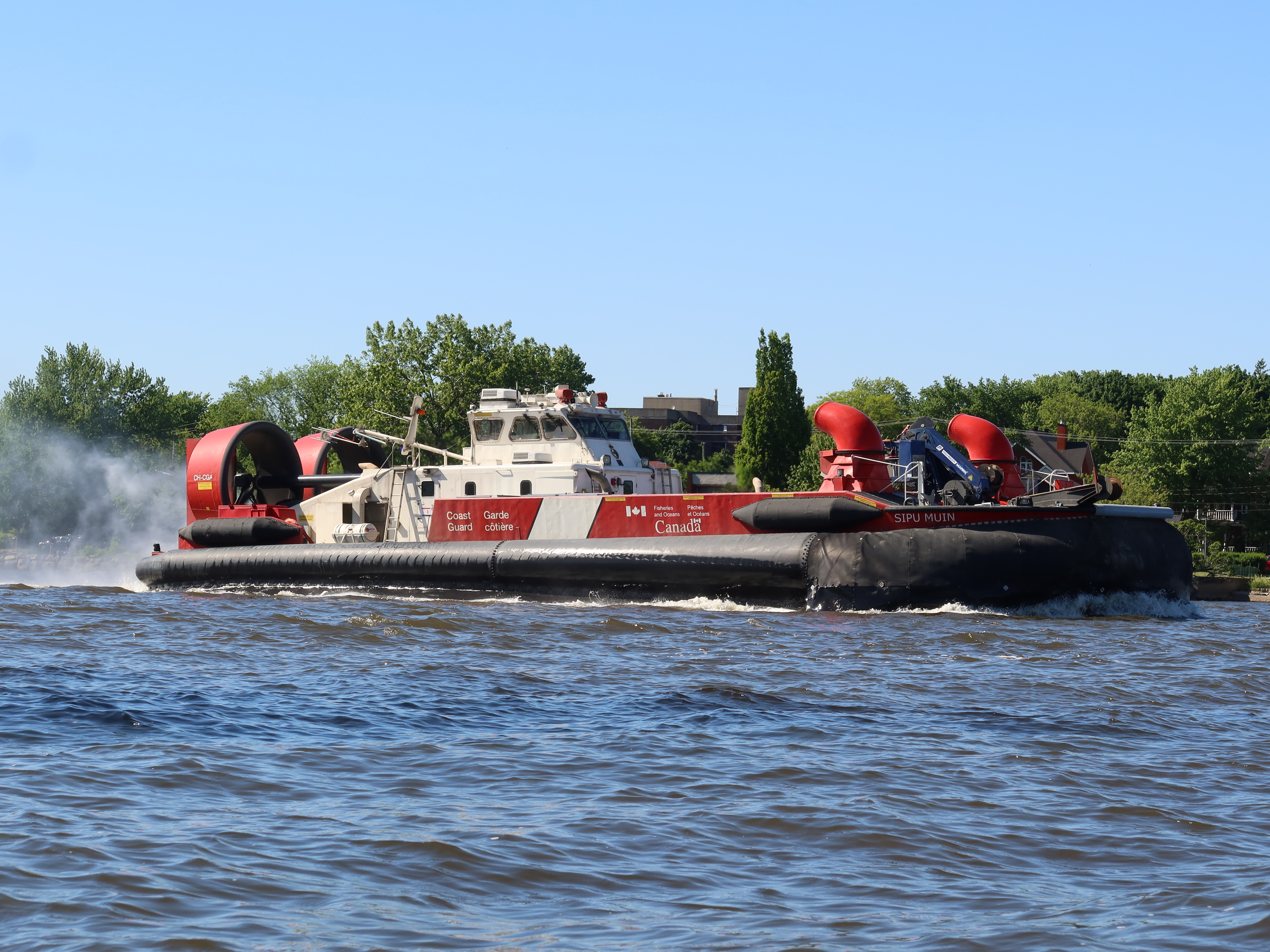
- CCGS Sipu Muin seen near Sainte-Anne-de-Bellevue, Quebec

History

Canada
- Name: Sipu Muin
- Operator: Canadian Coast Guard
- Port of registry: Ottawa, Ontario
- Builder: Hike Metals & Shipbuilding Limited, Wheatley, Ontario
- Yard number: 820551
- Launched: 1998
- Completed: August 1998
- In service: 1998–present
- Home port: CCG Hovercraft Base Trois-Rivières
- Identification: MMSI number: 316001988; Callsign: CH-CGA
- Status: In active service

General characteristics
- Class & type: Type 400 BHC AP1-88/400 hovercraft
- Tonnage: 70 NT
- Displacement: 36 t (35 long tons) standard; 70 t (69 long tons) full load
- Length: 28.5 m (93 ft 6 in)
- Beam: 12 m (39 ft 4 in)
- Installed power: 4 × Caterpillar 3416 TTA diesel engines; 2,818 kW (3,779 hp)
- Propulsion: 2 × controllable-pitch propellers
- Speed: 50 knots (93 km/h; 58 mph) max
- Range: 300 nmi (560 km; 350 mi)
- Endurance: 1 day
- Complement: 7

CCGS Sipu Muin (Note: CCGS stands for Canadian Coast Guard Ship.) is a Canadian Coast Guard Type 400 AP1-88 air cushion vehicle (ACV) or hovercraft based at CCG Hovercraft Base Trois-Rivières in Trois-Rivières, Quebec. The vessel was launched and completed in 1998 and entered service the same year. Sipu Muin is predominantly used for icebreaking, search and rescue, and for servicing navigational aids in the Lower Saint Lawrence River and St. Lawrence Seaway.

== Description ==
Sipu Muin is a Type 400 BHC AP1-88/400 air cushion vehicle (ACV) or hovercraft, the first of two vessels constructed for the Canadian Coast Guard. Sipu Muin, which is constructed out of aluminium, has a standard displacement of 36 tonnes (35 long tons) standard and 70 t (69 long tons) at full load and measures 70 net tonnage (NT). The hovercraft is 28.5 metres (93 ft 6 in) long with a beam of 12 m (39 ft 4 in). The vessel has a main deck cargo capacity of 110 m^{2} (1,200 sq ft) and a well deck measuring 8.2 m × 6.4 m (26 ft 11 in × 21 ft 0 in), serviced by a Polar Crane 5,000-kilogram (5.0 t) crane.

The ACV is powered by four Caterpillar 3416 TTA diesel engines of total powers 2,818 kilowatts (3,779 hp). Two engines drive 4-blade controllable-pitch propellers for thrust while the other two engines power the lift fans and bow thruster nozzles. Sipu Muin has a maximum speed of 48 knots (89 km/h; 55 mph) and a cruising speed of 45 knots (83 km/h; 52 mph). The vessel has a range of 300 nautical miles (560 km; 350 mi) with the endurance of one day. The hovercraft has a complement of 7 with two officers. (Note: Saunders states the complement as 4 and the cruising speed as 35 knots (65 km/h; 40 mph).)

== Construction and career ==
The contract to build Sipu Muin and sister ship Siyay was awarded in May 1996 to GKN Westland. The two hovercraft were built by Hike Metals & Shipbuilding Limited at their yard in Wheatley, Ontario. Sipu Muin was launched in 1998 and completed in August of that year. At the time of construction, Sipu Muin and Siyay were the largest diesel-powered hovercraft in the world. The name Sipu Muin is taken from the Miꞌkmaq phrase meaning "river bear". Sipu Muin entered service in 1998 and is based at Trois-Rivières, Quebec. Sipu Muin is predominantly used for icebreaking duties in the Saint Lawrence River and St. Lawrence Seaway along with servicing navigational aids and search and rescue duties. The vessel is registered in Ottawa, Ontario.

Beginning on 10 May 2016, the ACV underwent a six-month refit at Réparations Navales et Industrielles Océan in Quebec City, Quebec. The modernization included hull repairs and modifications to the pilothouse. The electronic navigation suite was upgraded and the fuel bladders and skirting replaced.

== See also ==
- CCGS Moytel
- CCGS Mamilossa
- CCGS Penac
- List of equipment of the Canadian Coast Guard
