= Southsea Hoverport =

Hoverport in Southsea, Portsmouth

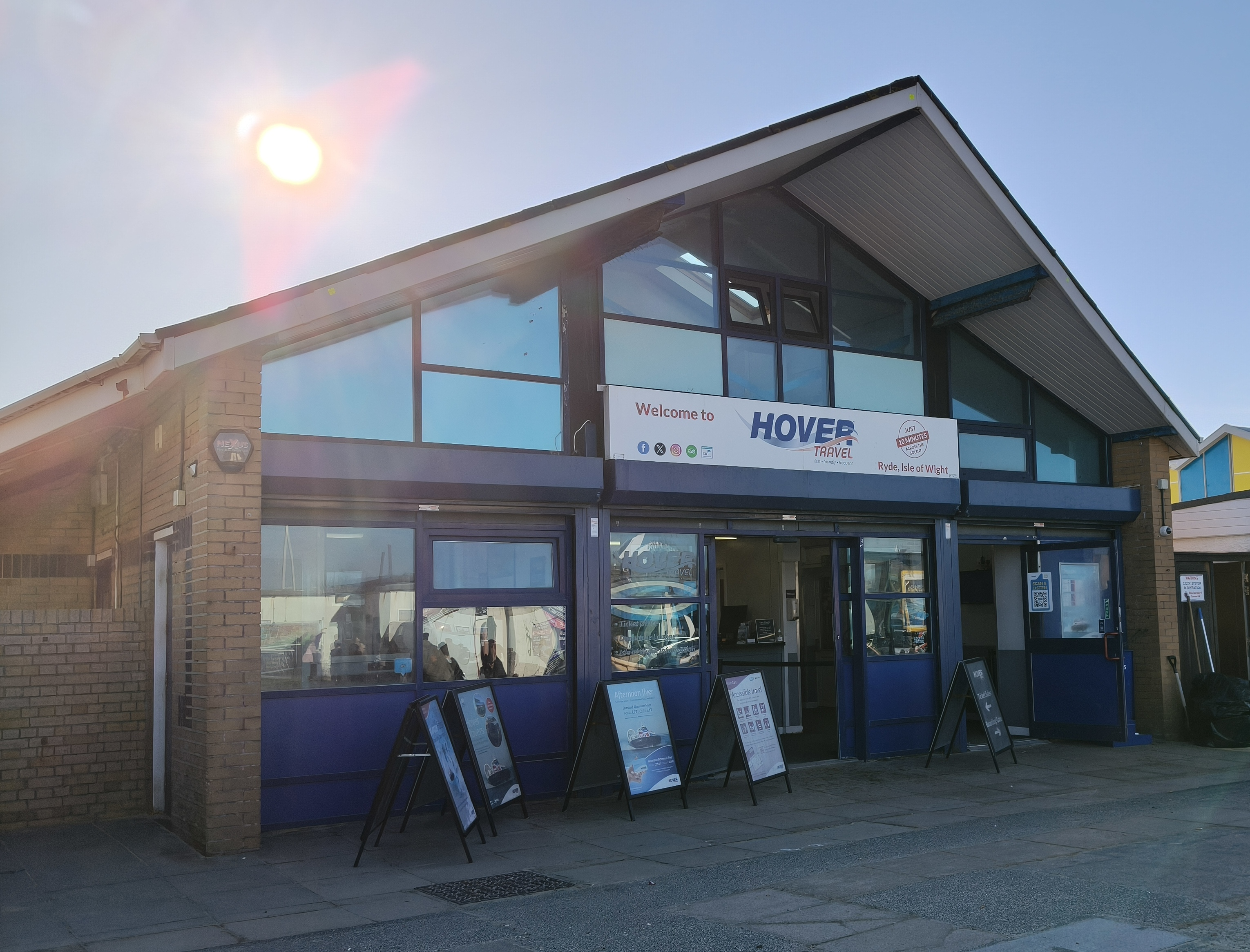
- Southsea Hoverport in March 2026

General information
- Location: Clarence Esplanade; Southsea; Portsmouth; PO5 3AD
- Coordinates: 50.785143°N 1.099939°W
- Operated by: Hovertravel
Location

Southsea Hoverport is a hoverport in Southsea, Portsmouth, England, run by Hovertravel, with hovercraft services between Southsea, and Ryde on the Isle of Wight. Adjacent to Clarence Pier, it is the UK's only scheduled hovercraft link, and the world's longest running hovercraft service.

The journeys occur every fifteen minutes, and take under ten minutes. The journey time is more than two times faster than the catamaran between Portsmouth and Ryde, and more than four times faster than the ferry between Portsmouth and Fishbourne.

== History ==
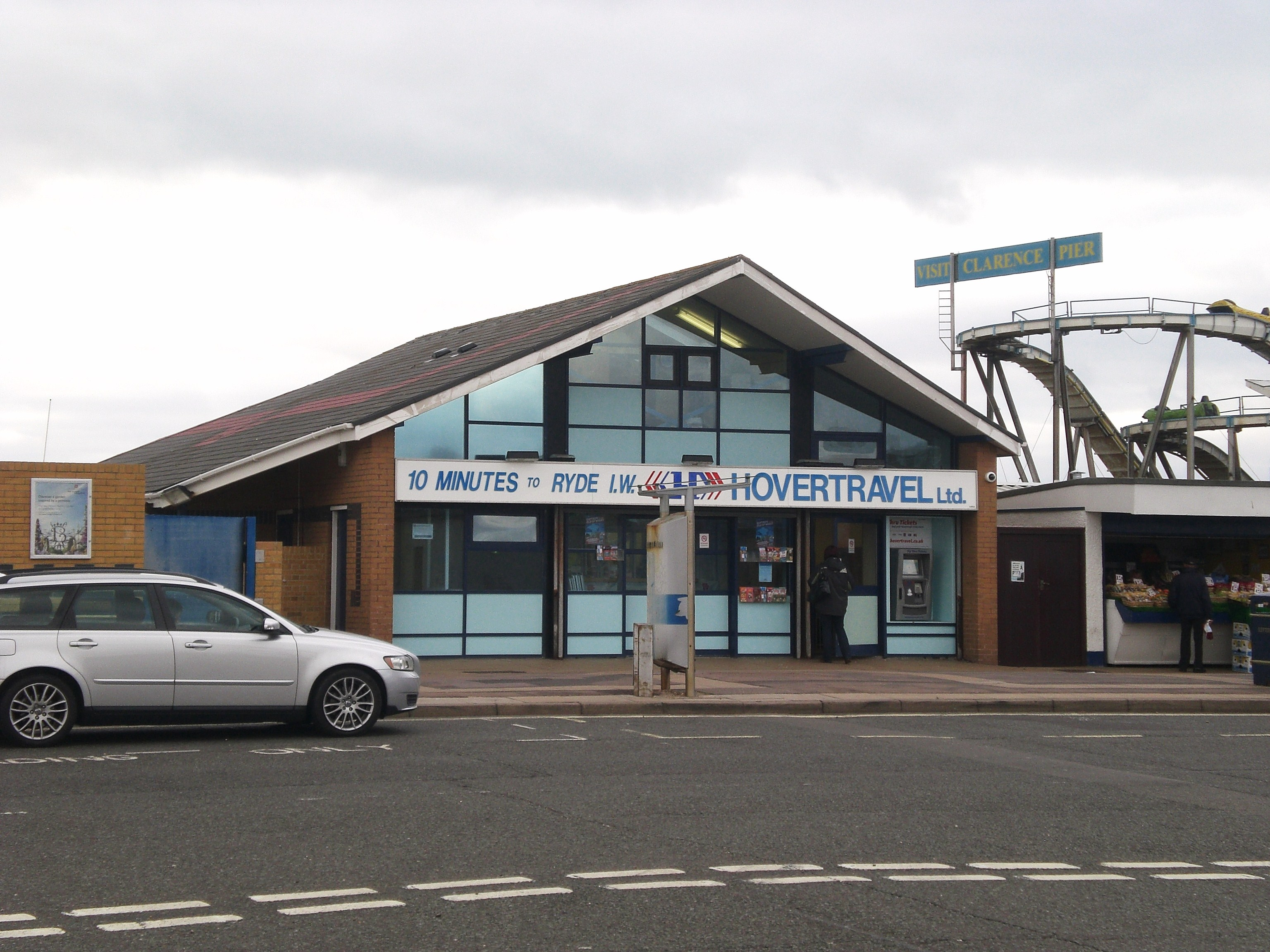
Southsea Hoverport, October 2009

The hovercraft route between Southsea and Ryde opened in July 1965. At the time, it did not have a timetable. Instead, the 38-seat SR.N6 hovercraft just ran when it had enough passengers. As of 2021, the hovercraft can carry 78 passengers.

On 4 March 1972, one of the hovercraft travelling from Ryde to Southsea capsized 360m away from Southsea Pier, due to strong winds. It was carrying 27 people. Five people died as a result, including seven-year-old Julie O'Connell and 48-year-old David Jones, whose bodies were never found.

On the evening of 24 June 2026, a hovercraft holding 31 passengers had to be evacuated at the Southsea Hoverport, after the engines were seen smoking. A spokesperson from Hovertravel stated that "a fire warning was activated" on the hovercraft, and that all passengers had been evacuated safely. The pilot used the fire extinguisher from the engine room. The fire service was deployed to the scene. Hovertravel said that it was cancelling its services, and that an update would be provided the next morning.

== See also ==
- Hovertravel
