= CCGS Moytel =

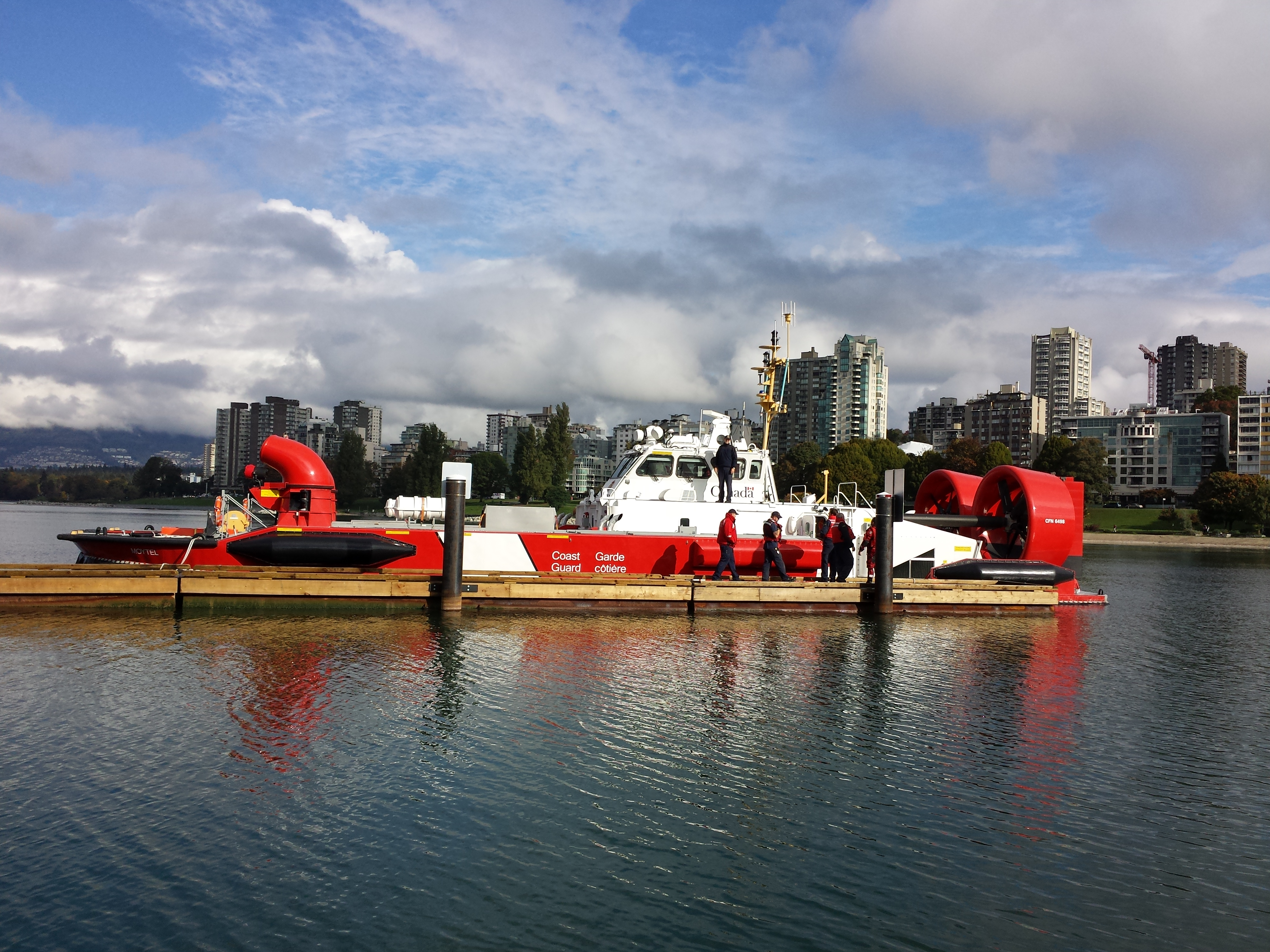
- CCGS Moytel at rest near Vanier Park, Vancouver

History

Canada
- Name: Moytel
- Namesake: Moytel means "to help each other" in Halq'emélem
- Operator: Canadian Coast Guard
- Port of registry: Ottawa, Ontario
- Builder: Griffon Hoverworks Ltd
- Way number: 837340
- Launched: 2013
- In service: 2014–present
- Homeport: CCG Hovercraft Base Richmond, British Columbia – Pacific Region
- Identification: CH-CCH; IMO number: 4908420; MMSI number: 316024578; Callsign: CFN6498
- Status: Ship in active service

General characteristics
- Type: Hovercraft
- Tonnage: 70.0 NT
- Length: 28.5 m (93 ft 6 in)
- Beam: 12.0 m (39 ft 4 in)
- Installed power: 3,356 kW (4,500 hp)
- Propulsion: 4 x Caterpillar C32 diesel engines
- Speed: 50 knots (93 km/h; 58 mph)
- Range: 400 nmi (740 km; 460 mi) at 45 knots (83 km/h; 52 mph)
- Endurance: 1 day

CCGS Moytel is a Canadian Coast Guard air cushioned vehicle or hovercraft and is based at CCG Hovercraft Base Richmond, British Columbia, on Sea Island. The primary mission of Moytel is to provide search and rescue services for British Columbia.

Moytel serves as the replacement for CCGS Penac on Sea Island, Richmond, British Columbia. The Canadian Coast Guard describes Moytel as a "more versatile amphibious vehicle capable of patrolling inland waters" as well as being "a larger [and] more powerful vessel than the CCGS Penac, [with] a greater range of capabilities and features, including a bow ramp that will enable it to transport supplies such as rescue equipment and vehicles."

== Description ==
Moytel is 28.5 metres (93 ft 6 in) long with a beam of 12.0 metres (39 ft 4 in). The vessel has a net tonnage of 70 tons and the hull is constructed of aluminum. Moytel is powered by four Caterpillar C32 geared diesel engines rated at 3,356 kW (4,500 hp) turning two controllable pitch propellers. The vessel is also equipped with bow and stern thrusters. Moytel has a maximum speed of 50 knots (93 km/h; 58 mph) and a range of 400 nautical miles (740 km; 460 mi) at an economical speed of 45 knots (83 km/h; 52 mph). The vessel has a fuel capacity of 16.7 m^{3} (590 cu ft) of diesel fuel and an endurance of one day. Moytel has a complement of six personnel of which two are officers.

== Service history ==
Moytel was constructed by Griffon Hoverworks Ltd and launched in 2013. The vessel entered service with the Canadian Coast Guard (CCG) in 2014 and registered in Ottawa, Ontario. The ship's name means "to help each other" in Halq'emélem. Moytel is based at CCG Hovercraft Base in Richmond, British Columbia and assigned to the CCG's Western Region.

== See also ==
- CCGS Mamilossa
- CCGS Sipu Muin
- CCGS Siyay
- List of equipment of the Canadian Coast Guard
