= CCGS Siyay =

Canadian Coast Guard hovercraft

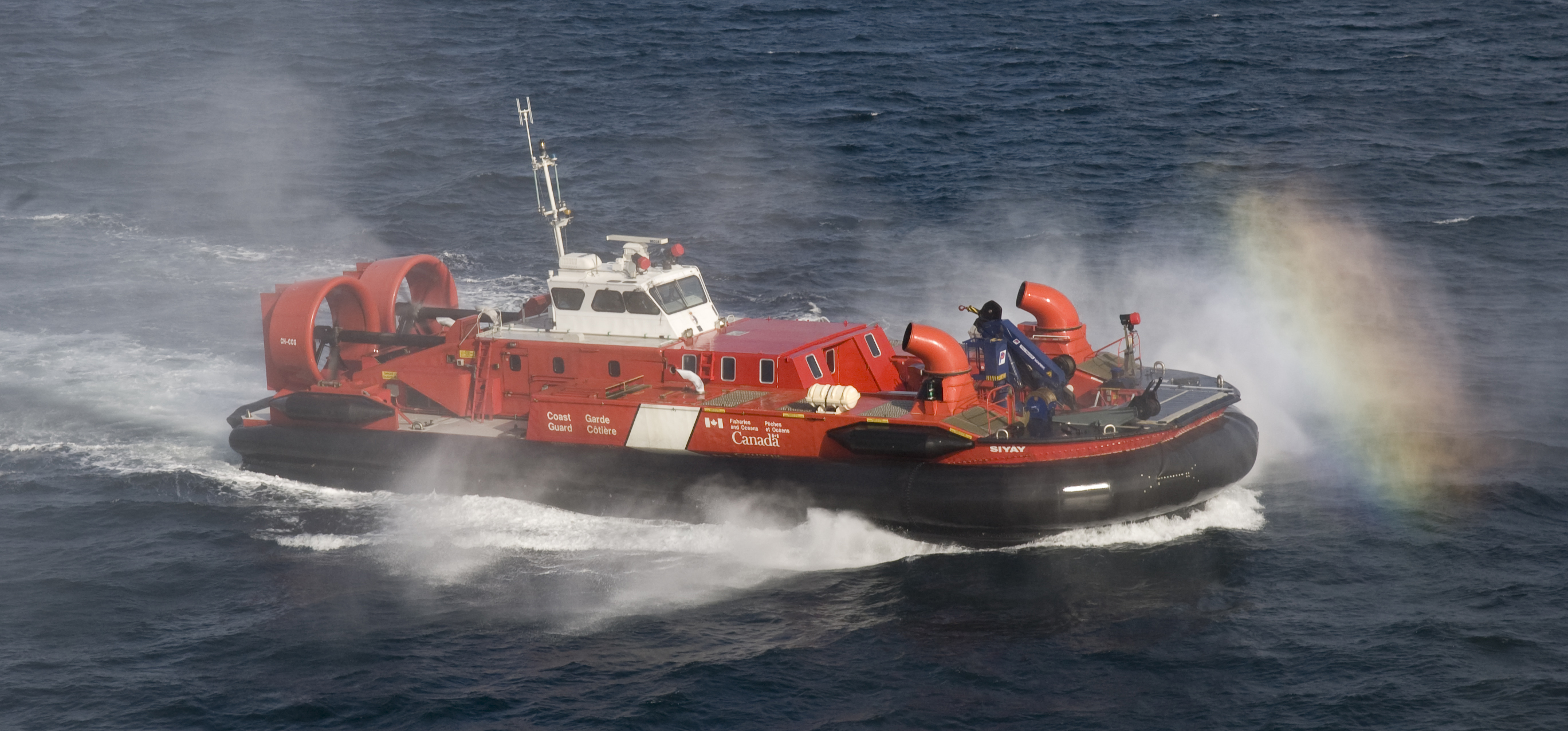
- CCGS Siyay

History

Canada
- Name: Siyay
- Operator: Canadian Coast Guard
- Port of registry: Ottawa, Ontario
- Ordered: May 1996
- Builder: Hike Metals & Shipbuilding Limited, Wheatley, Ontario
- Yard number: 820560
- Launched: 1998
- Completed: December 1998
- In service: 1998–present
- Home port: CCG Station Sea Island, Richmond, British Columbia - Pacific Region
- Identification: Callsign: WV8121; Pennant number: CH-CCG
- Status: In active service

General characteristics
- Class & type: Type 400 BHC AP1-88/400 hovercraft
- Tonnage: 70 NT
- Displacement: 36 t (35 long tons) standard; 70 t (69 long tons) full load
- Length: 28.5 m (93 ft 6 in)
- Beam: 12 m (39 ft 4 in)
- Installed power: 4 × Caterpillar 3416 TTA diesel engines; 2,818 kW (3,779 hp)
- Propulsion: 2 × controllable-pitch propellers
- Speed: 50 knots (93 km/h; 58 mph) max
- Range: 300 nmi (560 km; 350 mi)
- Endurance: 1 day
- Complement: 7

CCGS Siyay (Note: CCGS stands for Canadian Coast Guard Ship) is a Canadian Coast Guard Type 400 BHC AP1-88/400 hovercraft based in Richmond, British Columbia. The vessel was ordered in 1996 and launched and entered service in 1998. The hovercraft is predominantly used for servicing navigational aids and search and rescue duties.

== Description ==
Siyay is a Type 400 BHC AP1-88/400 hovercraft, the second of two vessels constructed for the Canadian Coast Guard. Siyay, which was constructed out of aluminium, has a standard displacement of 36 tonnes (35 long tons) standard and 70 t (69 long tons) at full load and measures 70 net tonnage (NT). The hovercraft is 28.5 metres (93 ft 6 in) long with a beam of 12 m (39 ft 4 in). The vessel has a main deck cargo capacity of 110 m^{2} (1,200 sq ft) and a well deck measuring 8.2 m × 6.4 m (26 ft 11 in × 21 ft 0 in), serviced by a Palfinger - PK3000M 5,000-kilogram (5.0 t) crane.

The hovercraft is powered by four Caterpillar 3416 TTA diesel engines turning two controllable-pitch propellers creating 2,818 kilowatts (3,779 hp). Siyay has a maximum speed of 50 knots (93 km/h; 58 mph) and a cruising speed of 45 knots (83 km/h; 52 mph). The vessel has a range of 300 nautical miles (560 km; 350 mi) with the endurance of one day. The vessel has a complement of 7 with two officers and a five person dive team. (Note: Saunders states the complement as 4 and the cruising speed as 35 knots (65 km/h; 40 mph).)

== Construction and career ==
The contract to build Siyay and sister ship Sipu Muin was awarded in May 1996 to GKN Westland. The two hovercraft were built by Hike Metals & Shipbuilding Limited at their yard in Wheatley, Ontario. Siyay was launched in 1998 and completed in December of that year. At the time of construction, Siyay and Sipu Muin were the largest diesel-powered hovercraft in the world. The name Siyay is taken from the Coast Salish word for friend. Siyay entered service in 1998 and is based at Richmond, British Columbia. Siyay is predominantly used for servicing navigational aids and search and rescue duties. The vessel is registered in Ottawa, Ontario.

In July 1999, Siyay struck a rock breakwater and the craft sustained significant damage.

In September 2014, Siyay underwent unscheduled maintenance, forcing the Canadian Coast Guard to redeploy other vessels to cover for the loss. However, by the end of the month, Siyay was back in service, rescuing seven people from a sinking fishing boat off the coast of British Columbia. In 2015, Siyay was taken out of service for a refit at the Seaspan shipyard, returning to operations in May 2016.

== See also ==
- CCGS Moytel
- CCGS Mamilossa
- CCGS Penac
- List of equipment of the Canadian Coast Guard
