= SR.N3 =

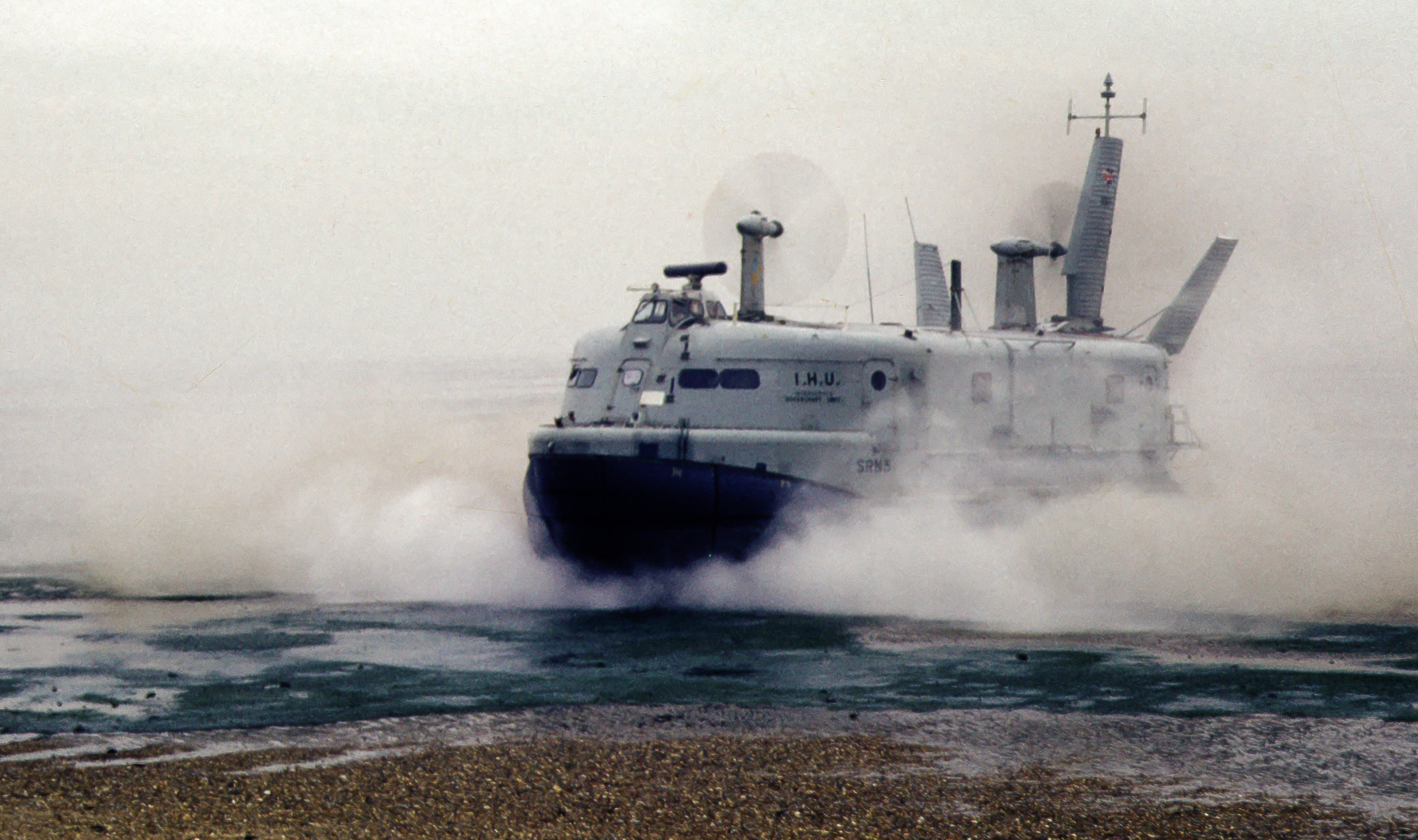
SR.N3 from the UK Interservice Hovercraft Trials Unit, Lee-On-Solent

The British Hovercraft Corporation SR.N3 was a 37.5 ton hovercraft originally designed by Saunders-Roe.

Launched in 1963, it was primarily aimed at military deployment. It was a military version of the SR.N2

Propulsion and lift were provided by four rear-mounted Bristol-Siddeley Gnome gas turbine engines that allowed the SR.N3 to cruise at 70 knots. The British IHTU (Interservice Hovercraft Trials Unit), based at Browndown, Stokes Bay, tested the SR.N3 in a wide variety of conditions, including ice. On 16 September 1964 an SR.N3 operated satisfactorily in a full gale and six foot seas. The SR.N3 never entered full service and ended up being used for target practice.
