= Griffon Hoverwork =

British hovercraft designer and manufacturer

Coordinates: 50°54′04″N 1°22′57″W

Griffon Hoverwork Ltd
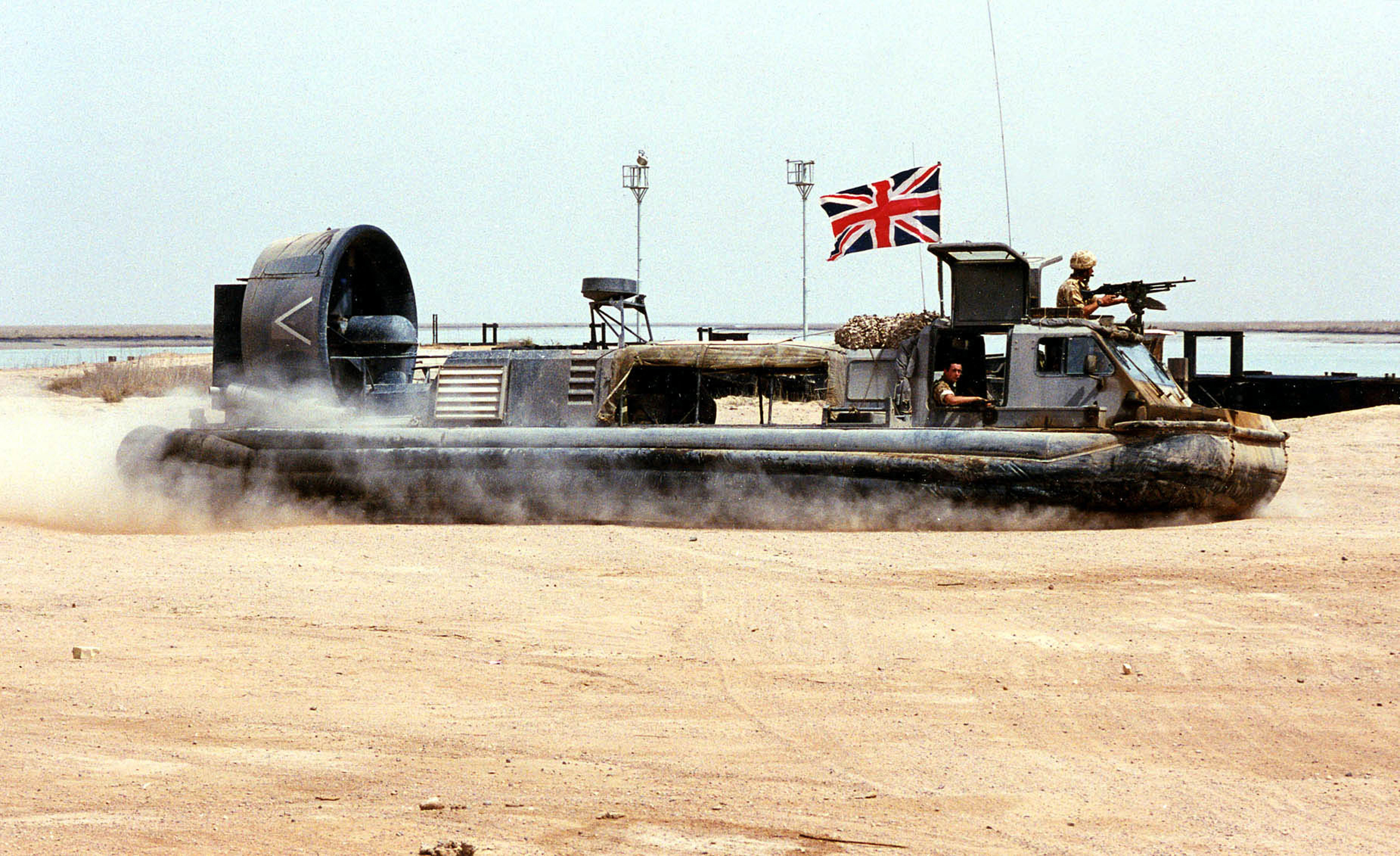
- A 2000TD Royal Marine Hovercraft on Patrol in Iraq 2003
- Type: Limited company
- Industry: Marine services
- Predecessors: Griffon Hovercraft Ltd, Hoverwork Ltd
- Founded: 2009; 17 years ago in Southampton
- Headquarters: Southampton, United Kingdom
- Key people: Christopher Cockerell; Dr E W H Gifford
- Products: Hovercraft
- Parent: Bland Group
- Website: www.griffonhoverwork.com

Griffon Hoverwork Ltd (GHL) is a British hovercraft designer and manufacturer.

It was originally founded as Griffon Hovercraft Ltd in 1976, based in Southampton. The firm set about the development of its own product range, launching its first diesel-powered hovercraft, the 1000TD, in 1983. During 2008, Griffon Hovercraft was acquired by the Bland Group; in the following year, it was merged with two other hovercraft specialists, Hoverwork Ltd and Hovercraft Consultants Ltd; the combined entity was branded Griffon Hoverwork Ltd. The company's primary facility is based along the River Itchen in Southampton.

At present, Griffon Hoverwork supplies a range of hovercraft, boats and other specialised marine services to governments, NGOs, and private companies for use in humanitarian, search and rescue, security and commercial roles. Being one of the oldest hovercraft manufacturers, Griffon Hoverwork's products have been used in various parts of the world. By August 2016, the company's existing market share extended into 41 countries while around 180 hovercraft have been delivered to end users.

== History ==
As a business entity, the company was established under the name Griffon Hovercraft in 1976; for the onset, it operated as a specialised manufacturer of hovercraft for commercial, military and search and rescue purposes. The company's founder, Dr E. W. H. Gifford, had been one of the early pioneers in the field, working alongside British inventor Sir Christopher Cockerell and having been involved with the first commercial hovercraft operations during the 1960s. Likewise, many of Griffon's engineering staff had participated in the development of various hovercraft at the competing manufacturing interest British Hovercraft Corporation, and drew upon their knowledge of the industry in the development of the company's own product range. Griffon Hoverwork's first diesel-powered hovercraft, which was marketed as the 1000TD, was launched in 1983.

Dr Gifford remained in charge of Griffon Hovercraft for many years; John Gifford, son of the founder, was the company's managing director at the time of its merger with Hoverwork Ltd in March 2009. Hoverwork Ltd was a long-established intermediary between hovercraft operators and manufacturers, having helped to launch chartered hovercraft services across the world and having predated Griffon Hoverwork by almost a decade. The merger also involved the integration of Hovercraft Consultants Ltd, a formerly independent specialist in the design, manufacture and operation of hovercraft since 1982; prior to its acquisition, the company had been a supplier to Griffon Hoverwork.

Following the completion of the merger, other changes have been made at the company while under Bland Group's ownership; changes in Griffon Hoverwork's operating practices include an investment in modern lean manufacturing techniques and a new emphasis on after-sales customer interaction; the latter involves offering operators various products and services to improve the sustainability of both air cushion and conventional marine vessels. During the development of the 12000TD hovercraft in the 2010s, Griffon Hoverwork drew on passenger-orientated analysis supplied by operator Hovertravel, a sister company also owned by Bland Group; the passenger experience was a major focus point for the new craft. The company has also made efforts to increase its distributor network; in September 2015, Griffon Hoverwork signed a distributor agreement with South African defence firm Paramount Group.

== Models ==
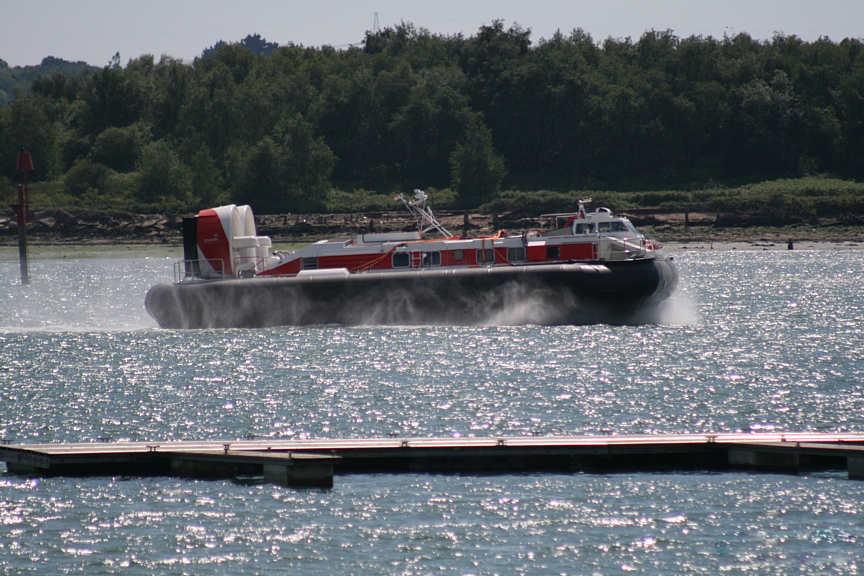
Griffon 8000TD on Southampton Water

Griffon Hoverwork produces a range of hovercraft that vary from a 380kg payload up to 75 tonne payloads. Their hovercraft are typically built with aluminium hulls, while parts of the cabins are constructed from glass-reinforced plastic with a bespoke design specialised to the role each given craft shall be used for. Griffon Hoverwork has designed each vehicle to facilitate a wide variety of fit-out configurations to suit various military, paramilitary, industrial, commercial, logistical and commuting purposes. Hovercraft provide a high level of versatility over challenging environments impassible to most other vehicles, such as marshland, tidal estuaries, shallow water, ice, and rapids.

The company was the first hovercraft manufacturer to power their craft with marine diesel engines which, they have claimed, provides a greater level of durability while operating within salt water conditions. Over time, Griffon Hoverwork has incorporated various advances into its product range. The 995ED hovercraft features an adhesive-bonded aluminium hull to decrease craft weight and thereby increase its viable payload; it is the first commercially available hovercraft in the world to be controlled through azimuthing propeller ducts instead of traditional rudders. The company's more recent hovercraft, such as the 995ED and the larger 12000TD, have adopted an electric transmission to deliver power from the diesel engines to the propulsion, manoeuvring thrusters, and lift systems.

Griffon hovercraft have been predominantly used for civilian transport, military, and life guard operations. They are commonly regarded as commercial craft for heavy duty applications, although considerations have also been made towards their use as leisure craft; passenger-orientated models typically feature noise-minimisation measures, increased external visibility, and accessibility accommodations. Furthermore, the company's product range is designed to meet exacting engineering standards; larger vessels are typically classified to Lloyd's Register standards or other customer-specified standards; they also meet compliance with various environmental, safety and reliability standards.

Specialised boats have been offered, capable of achieving speeds of up to 70 knots. The company also performs experimental design work. They designed and produced an experimental trimaran ferry boat for operation on the River Thames in London, hovering crop-sprayers, hovering cricket-pitch covers for Lord's Cricket Ground, and a hovering reed-cutter for a company in Austria.

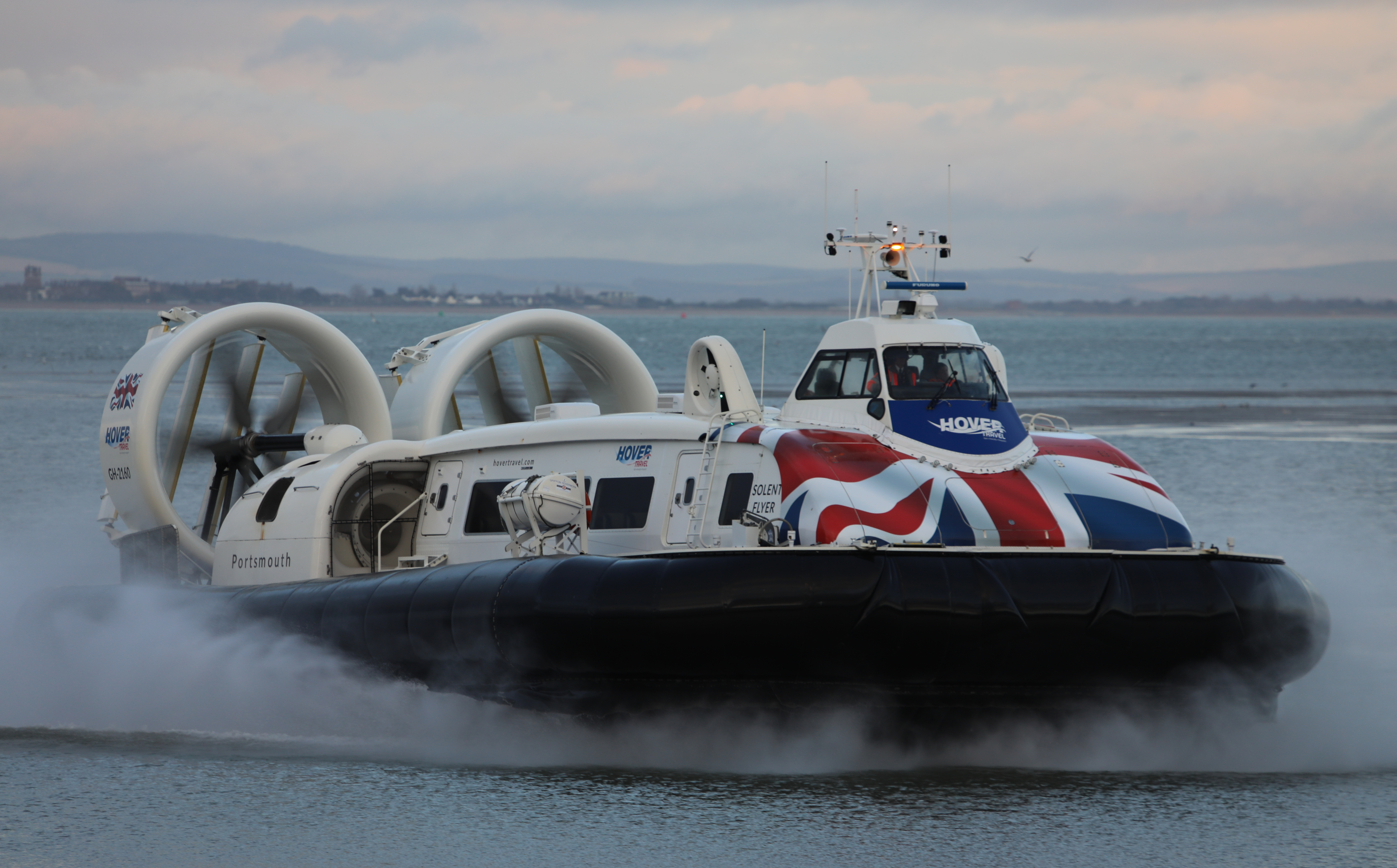
Hovertravel 's Griffon 12000TD, Solent Flyer

Griffon Hoverwork Current Range
| Hovercraft | Boats |
|---|---|
| 380TD | Enforcer 40 |
| 995ED | Enforcer 46 |
| 2000TD | Enforcer 50 |
| 2400TD | Griffon Cougar C10 |
| 8000TD | Griffon Cougar C119 |
| 8100TD | |
| 12000TD | |
| BHT | |

== Applications ==
=== Military ===
Griffon Hoverwork's products, primarily versions of their lightweight Griffon 2000TD hovercraft, have been purchased by numerous militaries around the world, including the Royal Marines, the Korean Coast Guard, the Pakistan Navy, the Swedish Coast Guard, the Polish Border Guard, the Estonian Border Guard, and the Lithuanian State Border Guard Service.

During 1993, the United Kingdom's Royal Marines received the first of several Griffon Hoverwork-built 2000TDs. Principally used for their amphibious capabilities, these craft participated in the 2003 invasion of Iraq. The Royal Marines used 2000TDs to perform high-speed patrols along the waterways of the Zubayr river, south of Basra. In 2008, Britain decided to upgrade the Royal Marines' 2000TD fleet to the 2400TDs configuration, which resulted in a higher payload capacity along with increased ballistic protection for its occupants.

Starting in 2000, production of the Griffon Hoverwork 8000TD became a major endeavour of the firm; its principal customer was the Indian Coast Guard, for which a joint manufacturing arrangement was made with the Indian company Garden Reach Shipbuilders & Engineers. At the time, this deal was the largest to ever be made by the company. Additional operators for the 8000TD series have included three examples supplied to the Korea Coast Guard and five craft for the Saudi Arabian Border Guards.

In 2010, in response to the 2010 Pakistan floods, the Pakistan Navy deployed its fleet of 2000TDs in a humanitarian aid capacity, assisting the 20 million people across the country; the fleet was able to deliver medical supplies and meet other logistical needs across uncharted waters that had otherwise isolated whole communities. That same year, the Pakistan Navy procured a pair of 8100TD hovercraft, each being capable of carrying up to 10 tonnes of payload.

During 2010, Griffon bid for work on the Ship-to-Shore Connector, which would replace the United States Navy's Landing Craft Air Cushion. On 6 July 2012, it was announced that a rival bid headed by Textron Marine & Land Systems had been awarded the $212.7 million fixed-priced contract instead.

During the 2010s, the Colombian Naval Infantry has introduced several hovercraft into their forces; these have been deployed in their long-running conflict against FARC insurgents within the challenging terrain of the Amazon rainforest. According to John Carlos Florez, commander of Colombia's Naval Force South, hovercraft have enabled year-round movement, which was previously impossible with conventional vehicles.

=== Civil ===
In 1983, Griffon Hoverwork supplied the South Coast hovercraft operator Hovertravel with the first of their AP1-88 hovercraft; these were used to ferry passengers between Southsea and the Isle of Wight up until 2016. Hovertravel elected to replace its AP1-88 fleet with a pair of Griffon Hoverwork's 12000TD hovercraft, known as Solent Flyer and Island Flyer, which have been in operation since then.

In 2000, Griffon Hoverwork supplied the Royal National Lifeboat Institution (RNLI), a UK based charity dedicated to saving lives at sea, with its first hovercraft. Two years later, the RNLI began operating a fleet of seven 470TD hovercraft, known as the H class. These are typically used for search and rescue over coastal terrain, including mud flats and quicksand.

In 2008, a Griffon 380TD entered service with Avon Fire and Rescue Service.

In 2010, a single 8000TD was bought for use at Singapore's Changi Airport.

In 2022, three 12000TD Mark.2s were bought for use on the service route between Oita Airport and Oita City, Japan.

== See also ==
- British Hovercraft Corporation
- Cushioncraft
- Christopher Cockerell – Inventor of the Hovercraft
