= Trois-Rivières-Ouest =

Coordinates: 46°19′56″N 72°35′35.7″W

Trois-Rivières-Ouest (French pronunciation: [tʁwa ʁivjɛʁ wɛst]) is a former city in Quebec, Canada, now in the City of Trois-Rivières. Population (2001): 23,287
