= British Hovercraft Corporation AP1-88 =

Medium-size hovercraft

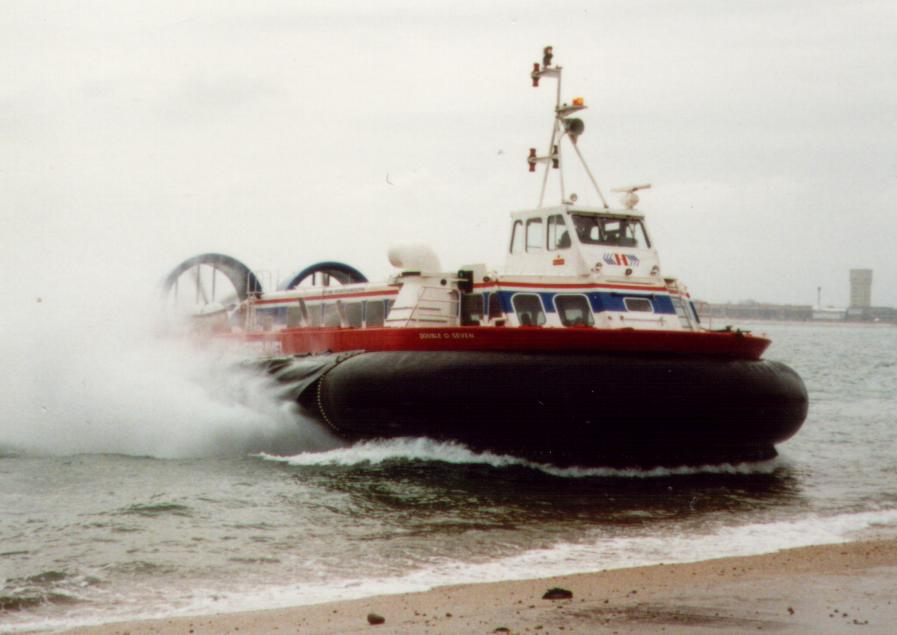
- Hovertravel AP1-88 'Double-O-Seven' arriving at Southsea after crossing from the Isle of Wight

Class overview
- Name: AP1-88 class
- Builders: British Hovercraft Corporation
- Preceded by: British Hovercraft Corporation BH.7
- Built: 1983-1998
- Completed: 13

General characteristics
- Type: Hovercraft
- Displacement: 47.6 tons
- Length: 24.5 m (80 ft 5 in)
- Beam: 11.2 m (36 ft 9 in)
- Height: 6.6 m (21 ft 8 in) on cushion
- Propulsion: 4 Deutz AG diesel engines 600 hp (450 kW) for lift and propulsion driving two three-bladed variable-pitch propellers
- Speed: 50 kn (93 km/h)
- Capacity: 101 passengers
- Crew: 3

The British Hovercraft Corporation AP1-88 is a medium-size hovercraft. In a civil configuration, the hovercraft can seat a maximum of 101 passengers, while as a troop carrier, it can transport up to 90 troops. When operated as a military logistics vehicle, the AP1-88 can carry a pair of Land Rovers, a Bv202 tracked vehicle and trailer unit or up to roughly 10 tons (10,000 kg) of cargo.

The AP1-88 had several advantages over earlier hovercraft in terms of its increased fuel economy and reduced noise output, which is principally due to the decision to power the craft using several diesel engines instead of using gas turbine engines, the latter having been used on earlier craft.

From 1983 to 2018, AP1-88-100s were operated in Britain by Hovertravel on a route from Southsea in Hampshire to Ryde on the Isle of Wight. Outside of the United Kingdom, vehicles of the type have also been operated in a various of locations around the world, including Norway, Australia, China, and Taiwan. The AP1-88 has been constructed under licence in Australia and China.

== Development ==
During the late 1950s and early 1960s, British inventor Sir Christopher Cockerell had developed a pioneering new form of transportation, embodied the form of the experimental SR.N1 vehicle, which became widely known as the hovercraft. British manufacturer Saunders-Roe, whom Cockerell had worked with in order to develop viable hovercraft, soon developed several commercially viable vehicles, such as the SR.N4, a large cross-Channel ferry capable of seating up to 418 passengers along with 60 cars, and the SR.N6, the first commercially-active hovercraft, capable of seating a maximum of 58 passengers.

As a result of high oil prices following the 1973 oil crisis and the 1979 energy crisis, the profitability of the first generation of commercial hovercraft was badly hit, causing some operators to lose money and provoking requests from customers for more fuel efficient vehicles. Advances were quickly made in skirt technology to require less power to keep inflated, and extensions of the existing vehicles were also performed in order to increase payloads, however it was recognised that there were other means to drive down costs and thereby improve the hovercraft's commercial viability. These early vehicles had been powered by gas turbine engines, which were typically similar, or identical, to the turboshaft engines used on helicopters; however, by the 1970s, recent advances in diesel engines had made the prospects for applying an entirely different form of powerplant to a new generation of hovercraft increasingly attractive.

There were demands from hovercraft operators for vehicles that were not only larger, and therefore capable of transporting higher numbers of passengers, but would generate less noise while the craft was in operation. According to the British Hovercraft Corporation's (BHC) chief designer Ray Wheeler has stated that studies conducted on prior hovercraft designs had attributed much of the noise produced as having been caused by the high tip speed of the drive fans, which was often close to the speed of sound. In addition to the noise issue; both BHC and its clients had a recognised requirement for lower cost vehicles, specifying the successor to the SR.N6 should be capable of being constructed for only half the cost of the earlier vehicle, as well as possessing half of the operating costs as well.

In response to the according demands of customers, BHC formed a partnership with operator Hovertravel in order to develop the envisioned hovercraft, which would be a cheaper and quieter successor to the SR.N6; £237,000 of funding was provided by the British Technology Group to support the initiative, which was to be repaid during via a levy on sales on the new craft. The majority of that project's financing originated from BHC itself, which would ultimately spend around £1 million of its own funds on the new hovercraft by the end of development. Accordingly, during the late 1970s, development work at BHC commenced on the new hovercraft, led by Ray Wheeler.

Early on in development, it was decided that the new vehicle would be powered by heavier diesel engines instead of employing a gas turbine powerplant, as the former would generate substantially less noise while also possessing increased fuel efficiency, as well as being only 20 per cent of the cost to buy while also having far lower and simpler maintenance requirements. The new hovercraft would be the first BHC hovercraft to make use of separate engines to provide lift and generate forward motion. According to Wheeler, the designation AP1-88 for the craft had in fact came about due to a repeated insistence by Dick Stanton-Jones, BHC's managing director, for misstating the designation given to the design by the company's Advanced Project Office, which had been AP118. The first prototype of this new generation of hovercraft was completed in March 1983.

Alongside the construction of a pair of prototypes, BHC decided to complete an initial batch of five production AP1-88s prior to the receipt of any orders. According to BHC, trials of the craft went smoothly and only minor modifications were made to the production AP1-88s, such as shifting the engines and fuel tanks slightly forward to improve the vehicle's center of gravity and the adoption of firewalls to manage engine-related heat. Upon launch, the company had envisaged selling around 90-100 AP1-88s within the coming decade. Several derivatives of the vehicle and applications of its technology were also examined, including a prospective scaled-up version capable of carrying 200-250 passengers.

== Design ==
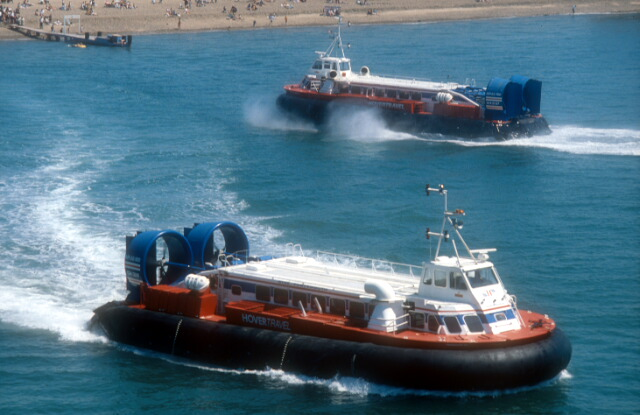
A pair of AP1-88s in service, May 1997

The British Hovercraft Corporation AP1-88 was a medium-sized hovercraft, principally differing from preceding BHC designs by its use of an arrangement of four diesel engines instead of a gas turbine powerplant configuration. Upon its introduction, the science & technology magazine New Scientist hailed the AP1-88 as being "sufficiently different to generate cautious optimism that the hovercraft is at least coming of age. Compared to its predecessors, the AP1-88 is cheap to buy and operate, and it is much quieter". It featured a number of design improvements over previous hovercraft, such as the cockpit having been repositioned to a high-mounted position in order to provide superior all-round visibility to the pilot, and the elimination of rivets via the use of a welded hull instead.

Increases in the efficiency of the skirt had enabled the use of a heavier structure for the AP1-88, thus the design team decided to employ traditional marine construction methods throughout the design; the BHC summarised this approach as having "moved from building low-flying aircraft to making high-flying boats". Typically, on prior hovercraft, construction techniques and materials common to the aviation industry had been employed, which had resulted in vehicles that were expensive to produce, procure, and maintain. Accordingly, a high level of simplicity was deliberately present throughout the design of the AP1-88 in order to produce a vehicle with the required level of cost savings; aspects such as the design of the fan blades involved considerably less complexity than on the preceding generation of hovercraft.

In order to produce far less noise than earlier hovercraft, which was one of the more important factors of the AP1-88's design, it was decided to adopt larger fans that would move at slower sustained fan tip speeds; cylindrical ducts were also set around the propellers in order to lower the amount of sidewise movement in the air. The wooden propeller blades were identical and fixed, unlike the complex variable-pitch propellers of earlier hovercraft, and employed a simple belt-driven arrangement to transfer power instead of the complex transmissions used prior. Additional noise reduction measures were also employed on the design, such as the rear of the craft being aerodynamically shaped so as to minimise turbulence within the air prior to contact with the fan, while the use of separate engines in order to provide lift and forward movement also had benefits in this respect; earlier craft had to keep running their main engines at high speeds in order to keep the skirt inflated, making hovercraft terminals noisy.

The AP1-88 could carry a maximum of 101 passengers for an endurance of 2.2 hours; this could be extended to 5.25 hours by reducing the area available for passengers to a maximum capacity of 90. In addition to the full-cabin model, BHC designed several variations of the craft, including a half-cabin model for carrying up to 40 passengers plus cargo, which could include light vehicles; a full-cargo deck could also be adopted for military and industrial applications to carry payloads of up to 8 tonnes. BHC projected the AP1-88's operating costs to be around £120 per hour, assuming between 2,000 and 3,000 hours of use per year on a typical 19 km route. According to author Ashley Hollebone, the vehicle could be readily adapted to perform various roles, including search and rescue, icebreaking, fire-fighting, passenger transport, and anti-submarine warfare.

== Operational history ==
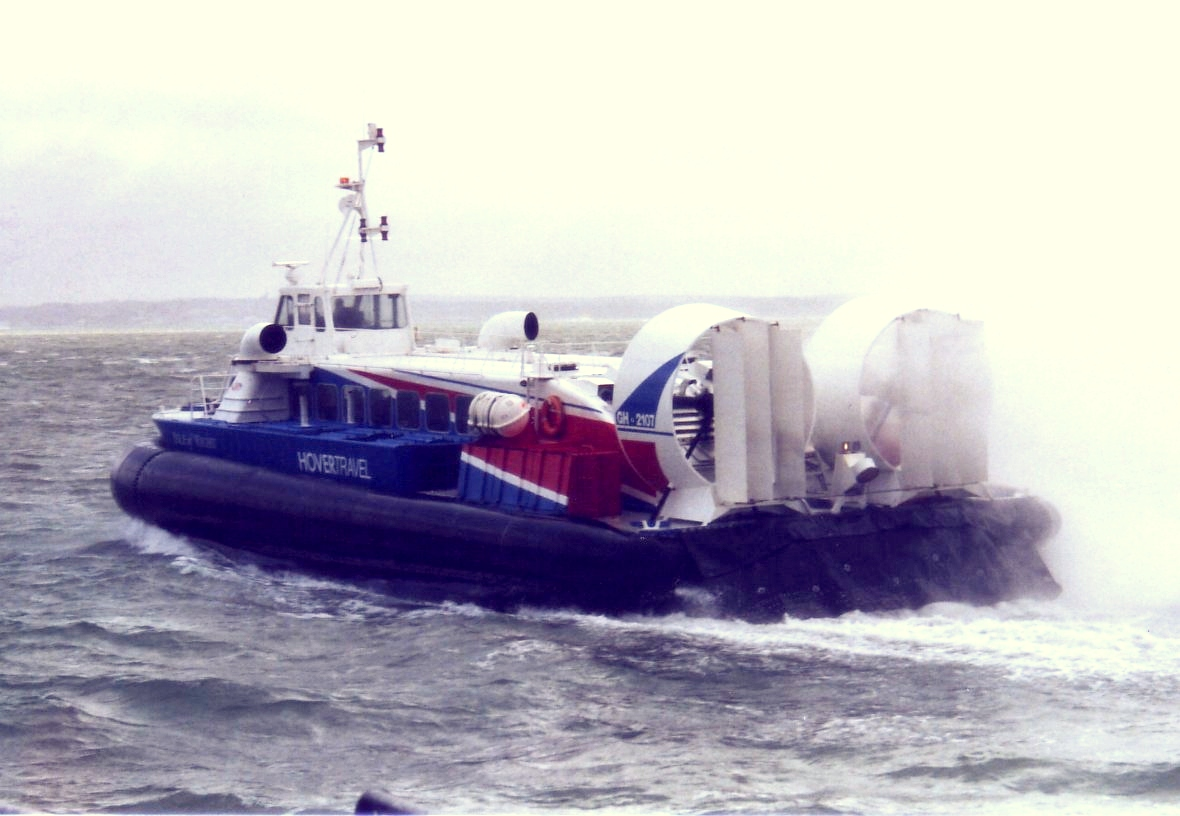
An AP1-88-100 near the Isle of Wight, August 2000

In March 1983, the first AP1-88, which had been named Tenacity by Cockerell, was completed. Three months later, the second vehicle, named Resolution, was also completed; it was promptly sold to the United States Navy. In 1985, a third AP1-88, Perseverance, was launched just prior to BHC's 20th anniversary.

British hovercraft operator Hovertravel procured a pair of AP1-88-100s for conducting scheduled passenger service. However, the company found that the vehicles lacked the power to operate in the presence of strong headwinds, alleging that the type would be unable traverse the intended route at winds in excess of 30 knots and that engine damage could be incurred. In response, the company decided to rebuild both of their AP1-88-100s; the modification involved slightly extending the vehicles' length by 3 feet and replacing all 4 Deutz AG engines with a pair of more powerful MTU engines. The engine change resulted in considerably more power being available, however this did not increase the craft's passenger capacity. Hovertravel retired the last of its AP1-88 fleet in 2018.

Two different versions of the AP1-88 have been operated by the Canadian Coast Guard. In the mid-1990s two AP1-88s, the AP1-88/200 and AP1-88/400, were ordered from GKN Westland Aerospace; the contract being awarded in 1996. These hovercraft were constructed by Hike Metal Products, located in Wheatley, Ontario. The two 400 series were completed in August and December 1998. Canadian vehicles include the CCGS Waban-Aki, AP1-88/200, CCGS Sipu Muin, AP1-88/400, and CCGS Siyay, AP1-88/400.

== Incidents ==
On a search and rescue mission on the Fraser River, the AP1-88 CCGS Siyay of the Canadian Coast Guard struck a rock breakwater and the craft sustained significant damage.

== Specifications ==
Type 200

- Designer / Manufacturer: Westland Aerospace
- Crew 3
- Dimensions
  - Length 24.5 metres
  - Width 11.2 metres
  - Height (on cushion) 6.6 metres
  - Full load displacement 47.6 tons
- Propulsion
  - Motor: diesel engines
  - Power: 4 Deutz AG diesel engines 600 horsepower for lift and propulsion
  - Propellers: 2 three-bladed variable-pitch propellers
- Performance
  - Speed 50 knots
  - Military Lift: 12 tons of equipment
- Weapons
  - None

Type 400

- Designer / Manufacturer: Westland Aerospace
- Crew 4
- Dimensions
  - Length 28.5 metres
  - Width 12 metres
  - Height (on cushion)12 metres
  - full load displacement 69 tons
- Propulsion
  - Motor: diesel engines
  - Power: 4 Caterpillar Inc. 3412 TTA diesel engines 912 horsepower for lift and propulsion
  - Propellers: 2 three-bladed variable-pitch propellers
- Performance
  - Speed 50 knots
  - Military Lift: 22.6 tons of equipment
- Weapons
  - None
