= Scottish Recovery Network =

Scottish Recovery Network brings people, services and organisations across sectors together to create a mental health system that embraces peer support and is powered by lived experience. Their work includes making sure people with lived experience are involved in a meaningful way in the design and delivery of mental health support in Scotland. The organisation believes that Together we can make mental health recovery real.

== Shaping Recovery in Scotland ==
=== How Scottish Recovery Network is making a difference ===
The Shaping Recovery in Scotland report and executive summary are the culmination of nearly two years of work with Habitus Collective. They used a variety of methods to evaluate Scottish Recovery Network's work to better understand its impacts. The findings inform the organisation's thinking and planning as they continue to work in collaboration to make mental health recovery real.

== Peer Recovery Hub ==
Launched in 2024, by Maree Todd, Minister for Social Care, Mental Wellbeing and Sport, the Peer Recovery Hub is full of tools, events and opportunities to inspire you to develop and champion peer support for mental health recovery!

It’s a space where Scottish Recovery Network shine a spotlight on fantastic peer support projects, services and organisations. A place where they share ideas and learning from people planning and delivering peer support activities, to help you do the same.
