= Hovertravel =

Ferry company operating routes between Portsmouth and the Isle of Wight

Hovertravel Limited

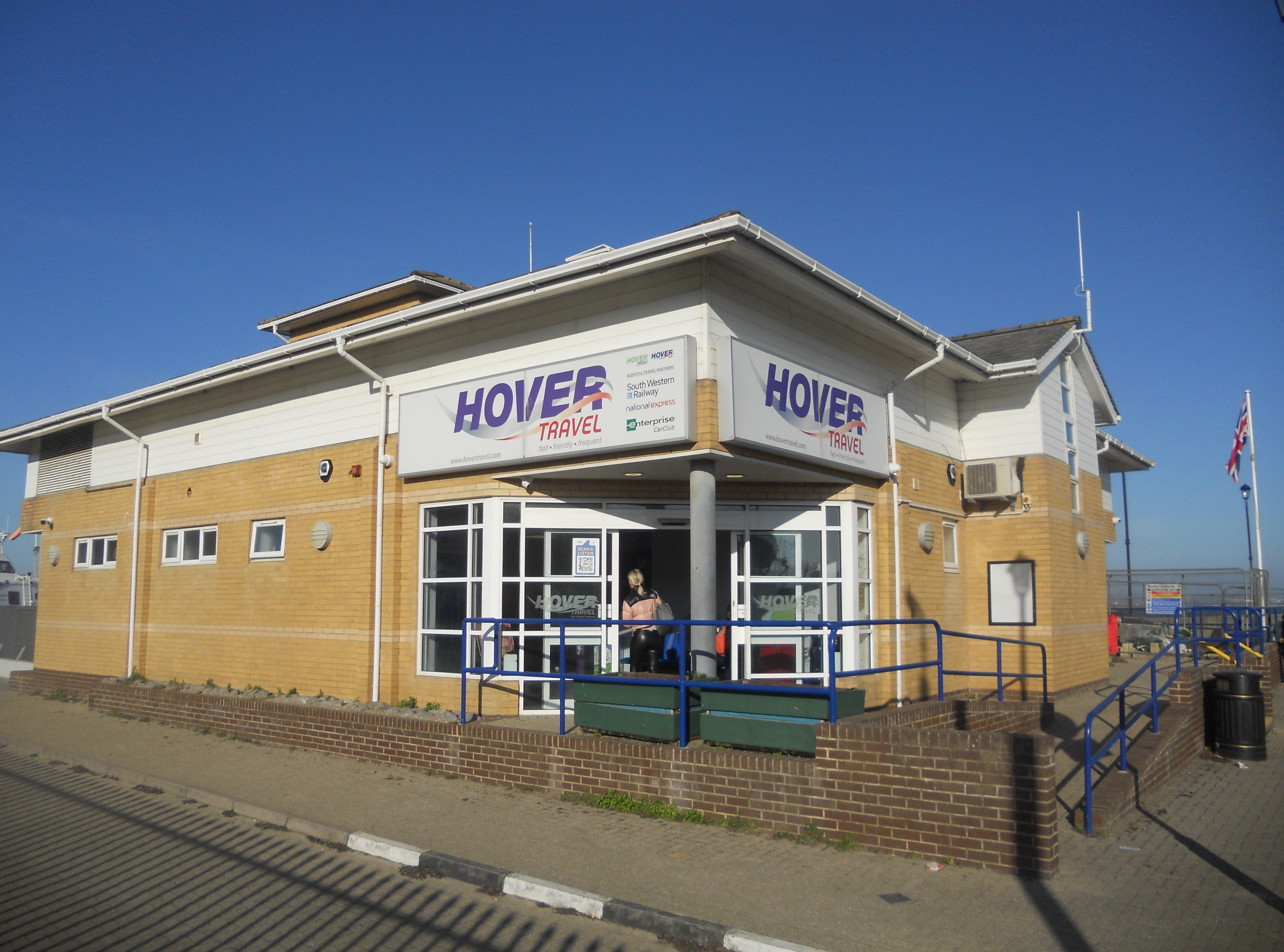
- Hovertravel terminal at Ryde, Isle of Wight
- Type: Limited Company
- Industry: Passenger transportation
- Founded: 1965
- Headquarters: Ryde, Isle of Wight, United Kingdom
- Area served: Solent, Isle of Wight, Southsea
- Owner: Bland Group
- Number of employees: 100–200
- Parent: Bland Group
- Website: hovertravel.co.uk

Hovertravel Limited is a ferry company operating between Southsea, Portsmouth, and Ryde, Isle of Wight, UK. It is the largest passenger hovercraft company currently operating in the world since the demise of Hoverspeed.

Hovertravel is now the world's oldest hovercraft operator, and this service is believed to be unique in western Europe. Hovertravel describes itself as "the world's only year-round passenger hovercraft service" (although there is a regular winter-only operator in Estonia). The operator's principal service operates between Southsea Common on the English mainland and Ryde Transport Interchange on the Isle of Wight: the crossing time of less than 10 minutes makes it the fastest route across the Solent from shore to shore. This service commenced operations in 1965. Hovertravel currently operates two 12000TD hovercraft on a single route between Ryde and Southsea. Additionally, Hovertravel has frequently operated other routes throughout the United Kingdom, typically as charter services.

== History ==
During the late 1950s and early 1960s, British inventor Sir Christopher Cockerell had, in cooperation with British aerospace manufacturer Saunders-Roe, developed a pioneering new form of transportation, embodied in the form of the experimental SR.N1 vehicle, which became widely known as the hovercraft. British manufacturer Saunders-Roe proceeded with work on various hovercraft designs, successfully developing multiple commercially viable vehicles in the mid-1960s. These included the SR.N4, a large cross-Channel ferry capable of seating up to 418 passengers along with 60 cars, and the SR.N5, the first commercially-active hovercraft.

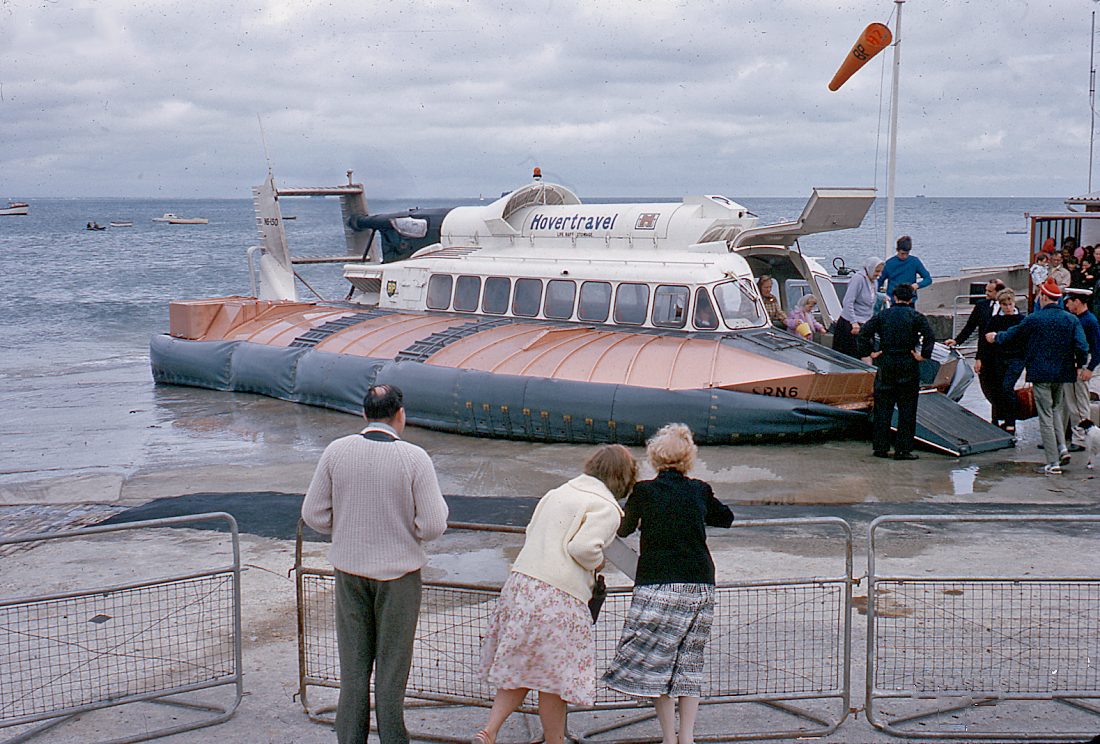
An SR.N6 at Ryde hovercraft terminal on the Isle of Wight, 1965

Hovertravel first commenced operations during July 1965, initially leasing a pair of SR.N6 hovercraft, a stretched model of the SR.N5 capable of seating up to 38 passengers, from the British Hovercraft Corporation (BHC). An initial service between Ryde, Southsea and Stokes Bay, Gosport, was established. At its onset, it was planned to run a seasonal summer service to provide a unique experience orientated towards tourists visiting the region; despite this intention, a high level of regular travellers and commuters used the service to the extent that a year-round service became viable.

Early on, Hovertravel faced direct competition from another hovercraft operator, the British Rail-owned Seaspeed with its rival Cowes-Southampton route. Eventually, Hovertravel took over running of the route on behalf of Seaspeed; however, in 1980, the decision was taken to discontinue the Cowes-Southampton service due to rising costs and increased competition from Red Funnel's hydrofoils, instead concentrating its resources on the Ryde-Southsea service, which was viewed as being more viable.

In addition to its scheduled services, Hovertravel was also quick to enter the charter market. Its hovercraft proved to be of particular value to hydrocarbon exploration and seismographic surveys, which would see Hovertravel craft deployed to barren deserts, frozen arctic conditions, and previously unexplored areas of the world. During 1968, one such expedition by a single SR.N6 successfully traversed the perilous Orinoco river during an exploratory mission deep into the Amazon rainforest. While the SR.N6 had helped to prove the value of hovercraft, it was not without its flaws; due to its dependency on aviation-derived technologies, Hovertravel's fleet became increasingly expensive to maintain over time, while its high noise output was not an attractive feature either.

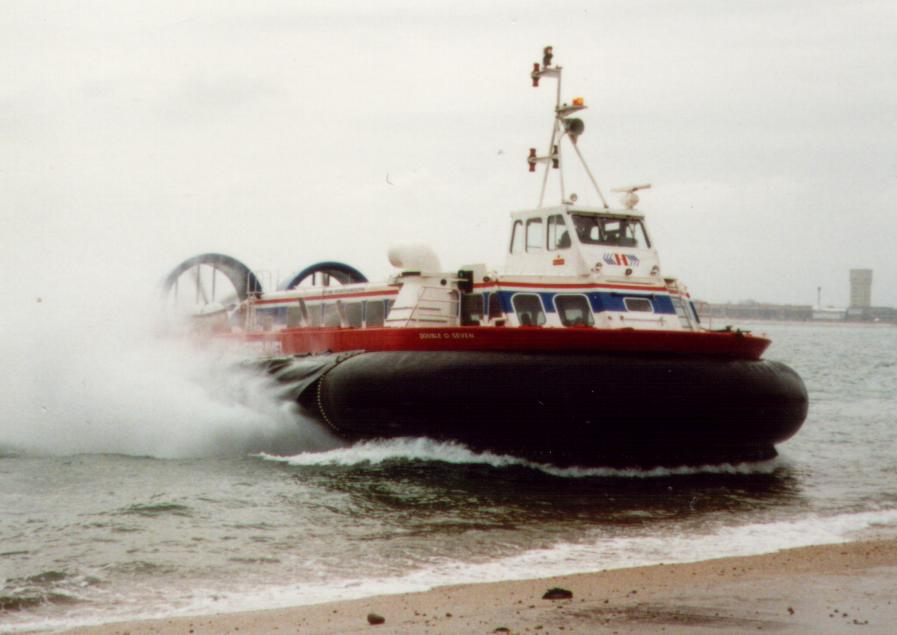
AP1-88 Double-O-Seven arriving at Southsea after crossing from the Isle of Wight

As a result of high oil prices following the 1973 oil crisis and the 1979 energy crisis, the economics of the first generation of commercial hovercraft was badly hit, undermining operators' profitability and provoking customer requests for vehicles with greater fuel efficiency. The BHC achieved several advances throughout the 1970s, improving its skirt technology to increase durability and require less power, while propulsion changes helped to drive down operating costs and thereby improve the hovercraft's commercial viability. While early craft had been powered by gas turbine engines, which were frequently similar to the turboshaft engines used on helicopters; advances in diesel engines enabled their application to a new generation of hovercraft. Hovertravel elected to procure the newly developed British Hovercraft Corporation AP1-88, a medium-size diesel-powered hovercraft.

Prior to the delivery of Hovertravel's first AP1-88 hovercraft in 1983, extensive trials were performed of the vehicle to evaluate it. It was found to be considerably more economic to operate and to purchase, costing half the price of the older SR.N6 in both respects. The quieter and more economical AP1-88 was credited by Hovertravel as having revitalised the industry; the type soon entirely replaced the SR.N6 and form the bulk of the company's hovercraft fleet into the 21st century.

By the turn of the century, Hovertravel was reportedly transporting almost 1 million passengers per year across its fleet, while its services were sometimes running at an interval of every 15 minutes at particularly busy points of the day. To cope with demand, the company sought a suitable replacement for its ageing AP1-88s. While a single BHT-130 hovercraft was operated for four years, it proved to be uneconomical on the relatively short Isle of Wight route, being better suited to longer routes, such as around Edinburgh. Another type of hovercraft was, therefore, sought to serve the Isle of Wight service.

Hovertravel's close relationship with hovercraft manufacturer Griffon Hoverwork has facilitated its preferences and requirements to shape the development of new hovercraft. During the 2010s, while defining what would become the 12000TD hovercraft, Griffon Hoverwork drew on passenger-orientated analysis supplied by Hovertravel. Hovertravel would later acquire this vehicle, on which the passenger experience was enhanced over earlier vehicles in multiple ways, including the incorporation of noise-minimisation measures, increased external visibility, and accessibility accommodation. Production of this new twin-diesel engine hovercraft, designated 12000TD, commenced in 2015, with deliveries starting during the following year. The type has been hailed as Hovertravel's quietest and most economically viable hovercraft to date.

During the COVID-19 pandemic, two of the company's hovercraft were modified to take stretchers, and a temporary landing point was opened in Southampton to allow patients to be transferred to its hospital.

On the evening of 24 June 2026, a hovercraft holding 31 passengers had to be evacuated in Southsea after its engines were seen smoking. A spokesperson from Hovertravel stated that "a fire warning was activated" on the hovercraft, and that all passengers had been evacuated safely. They said that the "pilot deployed the vessel's engine room fire extinguisher", and that "the fire service [was] on site". Hovertravel said that it was cancelling its services, and that an update would be provided the next morning.

== Services ==
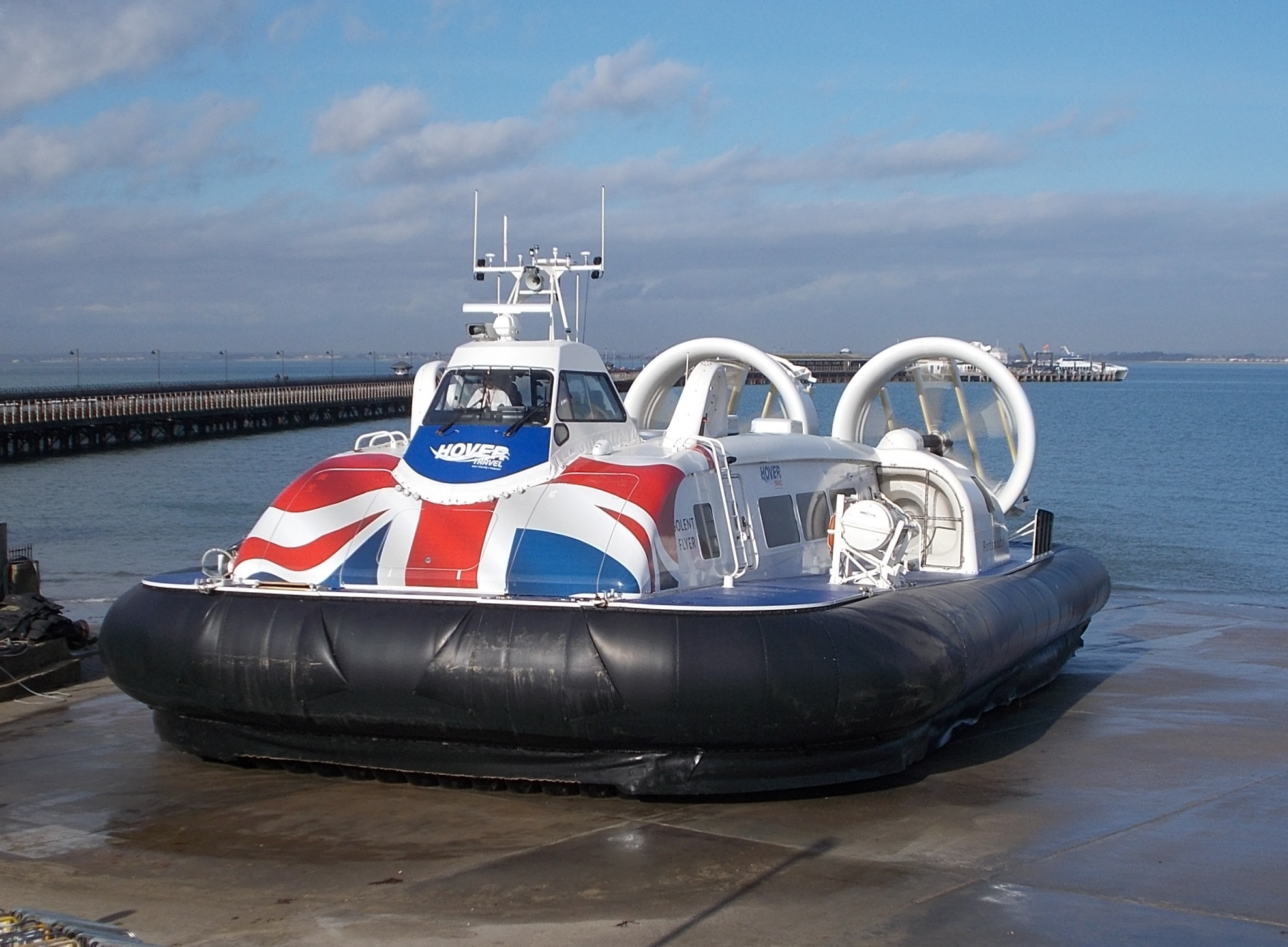
Solent Flyer at the Ryde hovercraft terminal, 2018

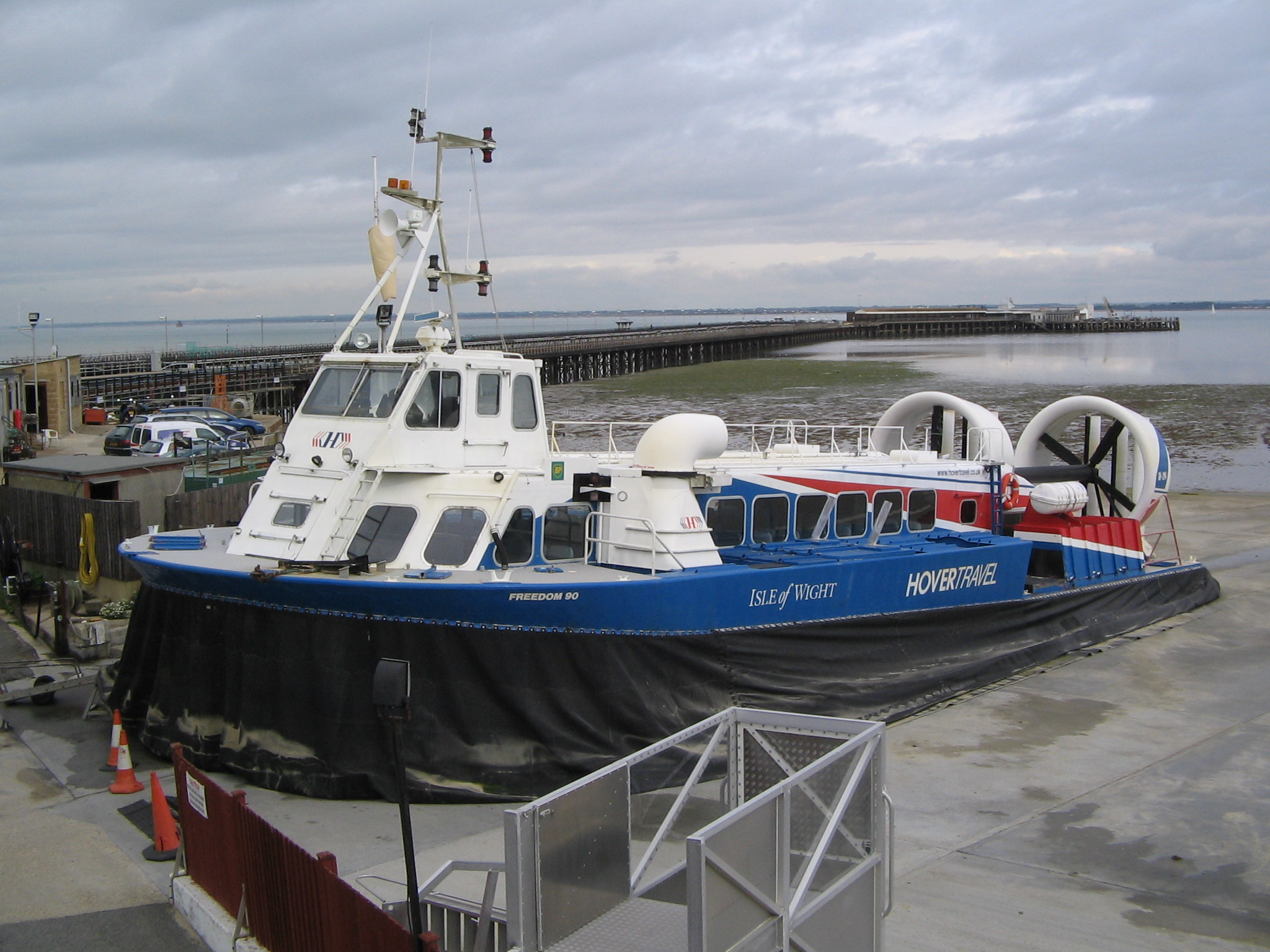
Freedom 90 at Ryde, 2008

For several decades, Hovertravel had operated a hovercraft ferry route between the mainland of the United Kingdom (UK) from Southsea across the Solent to Ryde on the Isle of Wight. During low tide, the hovercraft travels over sand flat at a distance of a mile to reach Ryde's hover port. By 2008, this service was the last regular route served by hovercraft anywhere in the UK. That same year, Southsea Terminal was refurbished to extend its lifetime and improve its facilities; alterations included a new wall separating the hoverport and the esplanade, as well as new lighting, toilet blocks, and a clean up of the site.

During October 2017, both of the Griffon Hoverwork 12000TD hovercraft were temporarily taken out of service due to several technical and reliability issues, including instances of engine failure. A pair of AP1-88s were taken out of reserve to operate the service in their place. The 12000TD returned to regular service three weeks later.

Hovertravel has occasionally been chartered to operate temporary hovercraft services across the Firth of Tay between Carnoustie and St Andrews, typically in connection with major golf tournaments, demand being amplified by insufficient hotel accommodation available at Carnoustie. Additionally, between 16 and 28 July 2007, the Solent Express was chartered to operate an experimental service across the Firth of Forth (marketed as "Forthfast") between Portobello, Edinburgh, and Kirkcaldy in conjunction with Scottish transport firm Stagecoach Group.

=== 1972 accident ===
On 4 March 1972, Hovertravel's SR-N6 012 capsized off Southsea, with a loss of five lives, including a single missing person who was presumed drowned. The craft had been en route from Ryde to Southsea with 26 people on board, including the crew; it had been about a quarter of a mile (400 metres) offshore when it was hit by an unusually large wave, causing the vehicle to capsize. All visible survivors were rescued from the sea, while the hovercraft itself was towed ashore at Southsea. The captain of the SR.N6 was praised for his prompt efforts to rescue the people on board. This incident was the world's first fatal accident involving a commercially operated hovercraft, and the first fatal accident involving a hovercraft in the United Kingdom.

== Fleet ==
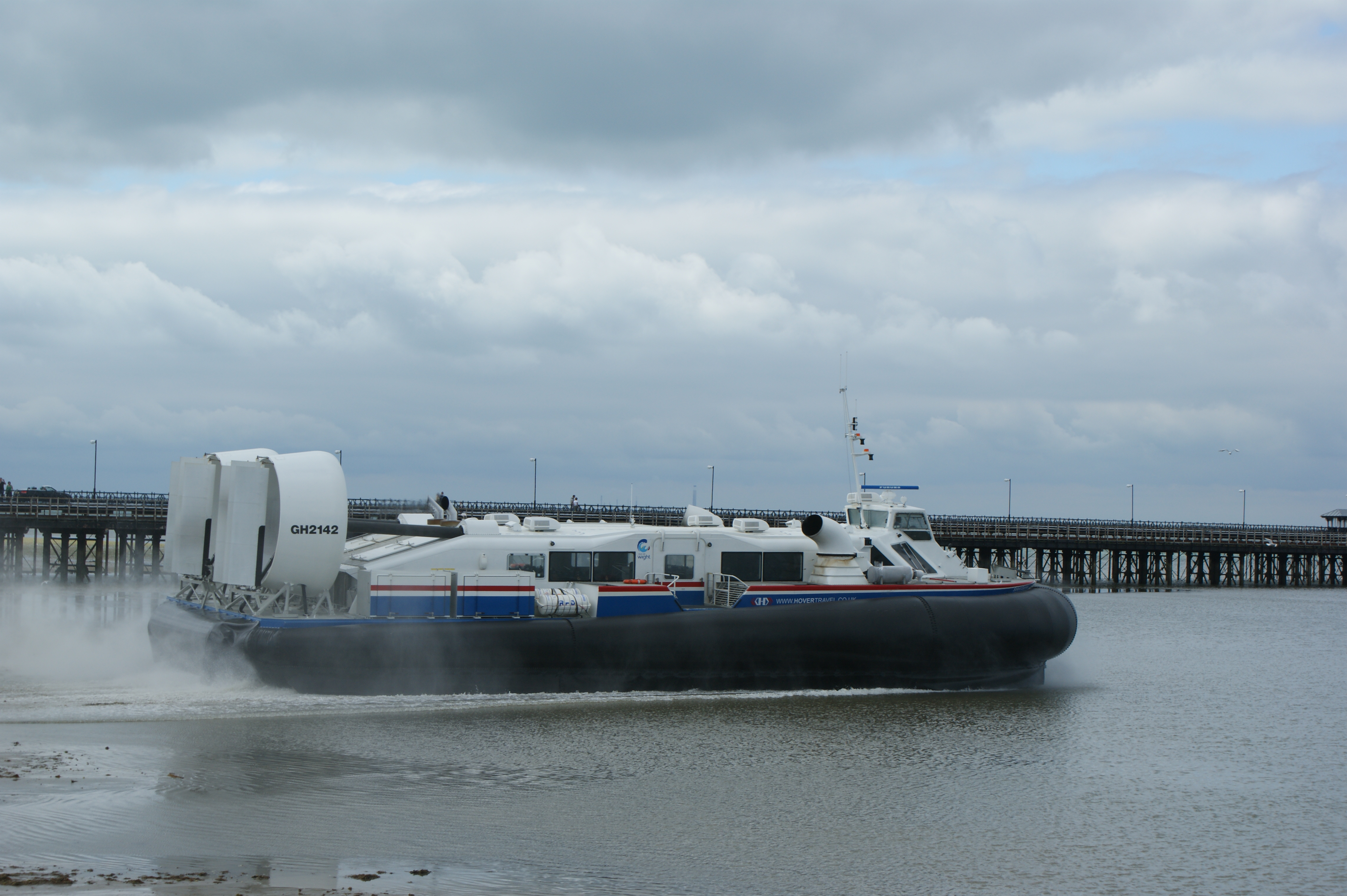
Solent Express leaving Ryde

Presently, Hovertravel operates a pair of 12000TDs, produced by sister company Griffon Hoverwork, called Solent Flyer and Island Flyer. Each craft is outfitted with 78 seats, access to the passenger cabin is provided via two doorways located on the bow of the vehicle. The pilot operates the craft from a central wheelhouse. Powered by a pair of diesel engines, the 12000TD can travel at speeds of up to 40 knots (74 km/h; 46 mph) while hovering around 1.5 metres (4 ft 11 in) above the surface.

Model	Number	Name	In service	Out Service	Notes
SRN6	012			1972	
SRN6	GH2014	Sea Hawk	1977	1983	Now on display at The Hovercraft Museum, Lee-on-the-Solent
SRN6	025		1968	1980	
SRN6	026/GH2012		1966	1981	
SRN6	130/GH2013		1965	1980	
SRN6	GH2035	Freedom	1974	1982	
AP1-88	GH2087	Tenacity	1983	1990	
AP1-88	GH2088	Resolution	1983	1987	
AP1-88	GH2083	Perseverance	1985	1988	
AP1-88	GH2107	Double-O-Seven	1989	2003	
AP1-88	GH2114	Freedom 90	1990	2018	
AP1-88	GH2108	Courier	1990	2000	
AP1-88	GH2124	Idun Viking	1997	2002	
AP1-88	GH2132	Island Express	2002	2017	
BHT130	GH2142	Solent Express	2007	2011	
Griffon 12000TD	GH2160	Solent Flyer	2016	Present	
Griffon 12000TD	GH2161	Island Flyer	2016	Present	
