= British Hovercraft Corporation =

1966–1984 British hovercraft manufacturer

- Founded: 1966
- Defunct: 1984
- Fate: renamed Westland (later GKN) Aerospace
- Headquarters: East Cowes, England
- Products: Hovercraft
- Owner: Westland Aircraft

British Hovercraft Corporation (BHC) was a British hovercraft manufacturer that designed and produced multiple types of vehicles for both commercial and civil purposes.

Created with the intention of producing viable commercial hovercraft in March 1966, BHC was the result of a corporate merger between the Saunders-Roe division of Westland Aircraft and Vickers Supermarine's hovercraft interests. None of the Vickers hovercraft designs reached quantity production, manufacturing efforts being centered upon Saunders-Roe's existing portfolio. Perhaps the most high-profile vehicle produced by BHC was the large SR.N4 Mountbatten class hovercraft; it was the largest civil-oriented hovercraft to ever be put into service; several were completed and used in revenue services across the English Channel for multiple decades.

Later on, the BHC developed their own newer hovercraft designs, such as the military-oriented BH.7 Wellington class and the medium-size diesel-powered British Hovercraft Corporation AP1-88. These vehicles made advances in the efficiency and viability of hovercraft; the AP1-88 was produced in quantity not only by BHC but also under licence in both Australia and China. In 1970, Westland Aircraft acquired the shares from the other firm's owners, making the BHC a wholly owned subsidiary of Westland. During the 1980s, the firm's focus on hovercraft declined as it became increasingly involved in the manufacture of composites for other company's products. In 1984, the company became part of Westland Aerospace (later Westland Helicopters).

== History ==
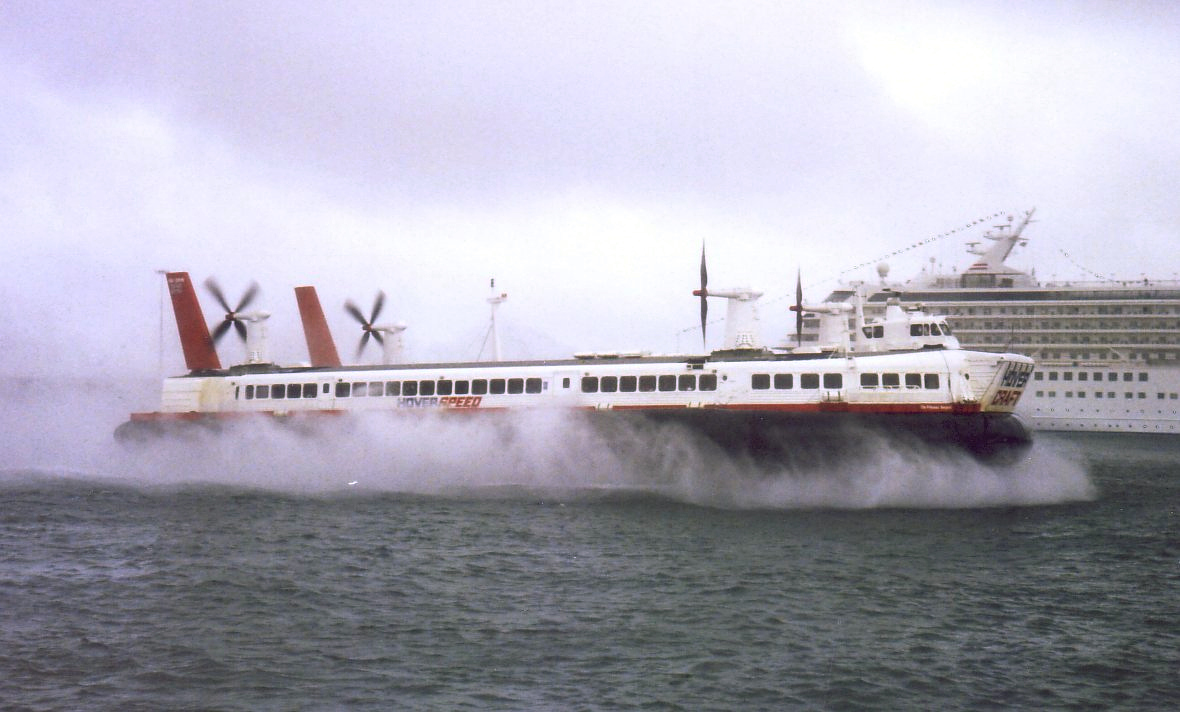
SR.N4 Princess Margaret at the mouth of the Western Docks in Dover, 1998

During the late 1950s and early 1960s, British inventor Sir Christopher Cockerell had, in cooperation with British aerospace manufacturer Saunders-Roe, developed a pioneering new form of transportation, embodied in the form of the experimental SR.N1 vehicle, which became widely known as the hovercraft. British manufacturer Saunders-Roe proceeded with work on various hovercraft designs, successfully developing multiple commercially viable vehicles. These included the SR.N4, a large cross-Channel ferry capable of seating up to 418 passengers along with 60 cars, and the SR.N5, the first commercially active hovercraft.

British Hovercraft Corporation (BHC) emerged as a corporate entity in March 1966, at which point the Saunders-Roe division of Westland Aircraft and Vickers Supermarine (the two largest hovercraft manufacturers in the world) were merged. Following the merger, Westland Aircraft held 65% of the shares in BHC, while Vickers had a 25% stake in the venture and the British state-owned National Research Development Corporation also held 10% of the shares. Despite the inclusion of Vickers' hovercraft venture, none of its designs were ever taken through to the manufacturing stage; instead, production activity was centred on the existing designs produced by Saunders-Roe, including the SR.N5 Warden class, the stretched SR.N6 Winchester class, and the large SR.N4 Mountbatten class hovercraft.

Substantial support for the hovercraft industry, and BHC specifically, was sourced directly from the British Government. By 1969, contributions from the British state averaged around £3 million per year; of this, roughly one-third was attributed to research and development contracts, while the remaining two-thirds was divided between financing the Joint Services Military Trials Unit based at Lee-on-Solent and the National Physical Laboratory's Hythe division. In addition to financing, the British Government was also keen to implement a regulatory framework for the hovercraft sector, including the implementation of safety certification, leading to the Hovercraft Act of 1968.

However, not all commitments made by the British government would be ultimately be fulfilled. As early as 1964, Saunders-Roe had been engaged in studies of very large hovercraft, including a prospective 2,000 ton freighter-oriented vehicle, in addition to its ongoing interest in the development of smaller-scale hovercraft. Work on giant ocean-going hovercraft continued under the BHC, but ultimately did not lead to any vehicle larger than the SR.N4 being produced. During 1968, the British government decided to withdraw its backing for the company's feasibility study on large hovercraft, resulting in the BHC's development programme being curtailed.

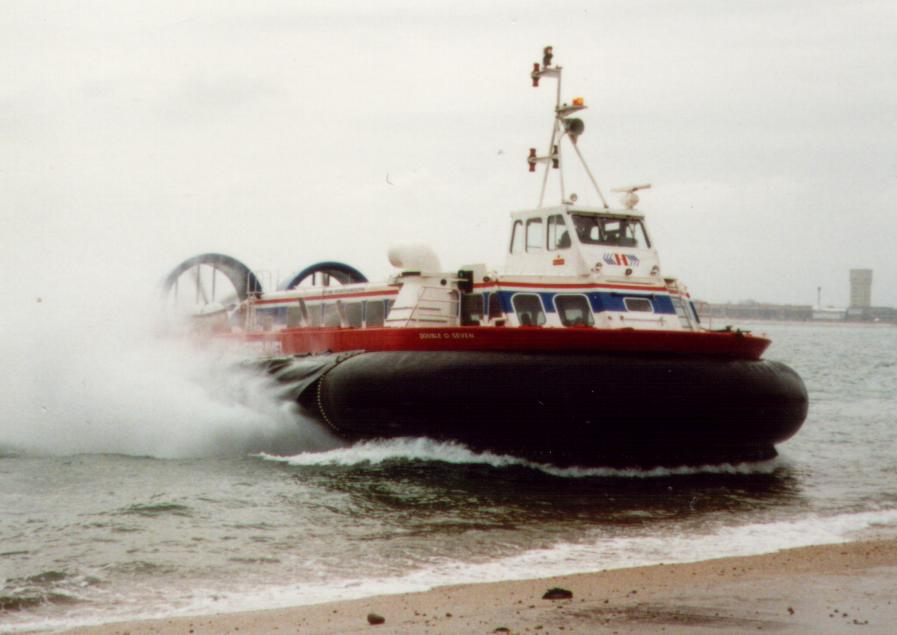
Hovertravel AP1-88 'Double-O-Seven' arriving at Southsea after crossing from the Isle of Wight

As a result of high oil prices following the 1973 oil crisis and the 1979 energy crisis, the profitability of the first generation of commercial hovercraft was badly hit, undermining operators' profitability and provoking requests from customers for more fuel efficient vehicles. Furthermore, hovercraft were not the only high-speed water vehicles making advances at this time; competing technologies included the hydrofoil and the pump-jet. As early as 1969, rival hovercraft manufacturers had encountered commercial difficulties and been liquidated.

Throughout the 1970s, the BHC made several advances in its skirt technology, such as requiring less power to keep inflated; the company also produced extensions of its existing hovercraft range, which had the benefit of increasing payload capacity. It was also recognised that there were other means to drive down costs and thereby improve the hovercraft's commercial viability. These early vehicles had been powered by gas turbine engines, which were typically similar, or identical, to the turboshaft engines used on helicopters; however, by the 1970s, recent advances in diesel engines had made the prospects for applying an entirely different form of powerplant to a new generation of hovercraft increasingly attractive.

The BHC successfully developed its own original hovercraft designs during its existence. The BH.7 Wellington class is a military-oriented model, while the British Hovercraft Corporation AP1-88 is a medium-size diesel-powered hovercraft. The AP1-88 was notably cheaper to operate and to purchase, being half the price of the older SR.N6 in both respects. The type was produced in quantity not only by the BHC, but was also constructed under licence by companies in both Australia and China. While plans to procure the BH.7 for the British Army were terminated during 1968, government support continued to be forthcoming; the Ministry of Technology ordered a single BH.7, helping to facilitate the launch of a Navy-oriented version.

In 1970, Westland Aircraft acquired the shares of the other parties, resulting in the BHC becoming a wholly owned subsidiary of Westland. In 1971, Westland successfully acquired the competing British rival Cushioncraft from Britten-Norman.

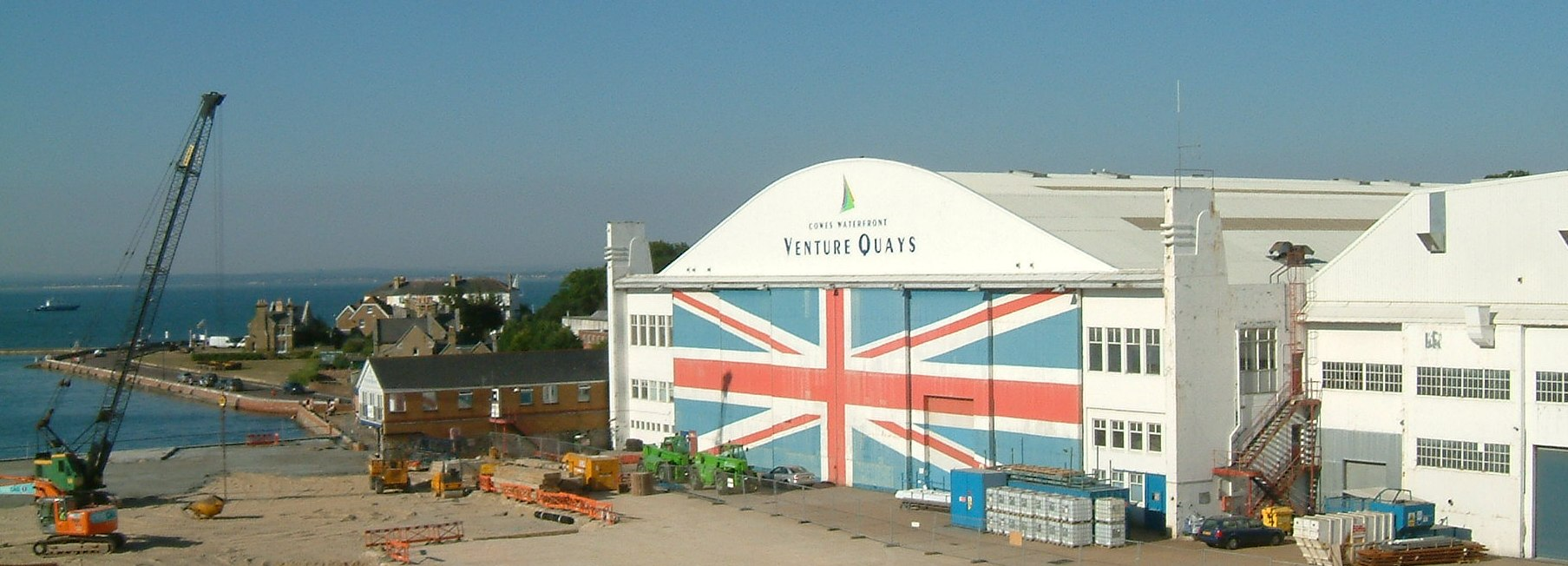
British Hovercraft Corporation hangar at East Cowes

During 1977, the BHC created the largest Union Flag in the world. It was painted on the doors of their hangar on the seafront at East Cowes to celebrate the Silver Jubilee of Elizabeth II.

In 1984, the company was acquired by Westland Aerospace; around this time, design work on new hovercraft effectively ceased. Instead, the company became increasingly involved with the manufacture of composites, which were widely used throughout the aerospace industry. Later, after GKN had taken over the Westlands Group in 1994, the firm was renamed "GKN Aerospace."

== Craft ==
Inherited designs from the Saunders Roe division of Westland Aircraft:

- SR.N2
- SR.N3
- SR.N4
- SR.N5
- SR.N6

Other:

- British Hovercraft Corporation BH.7 (Wellington class)
- British Hovercraft Corporation BH.8 (Proposal)
- BHC Hoverfreighter (Proposal)
- British Hovercraft Corporation AP1-88
- Patrol Air Cushion Vehicle
