= Wheatley, Ontario =

Wheatley
- Unincorporated community
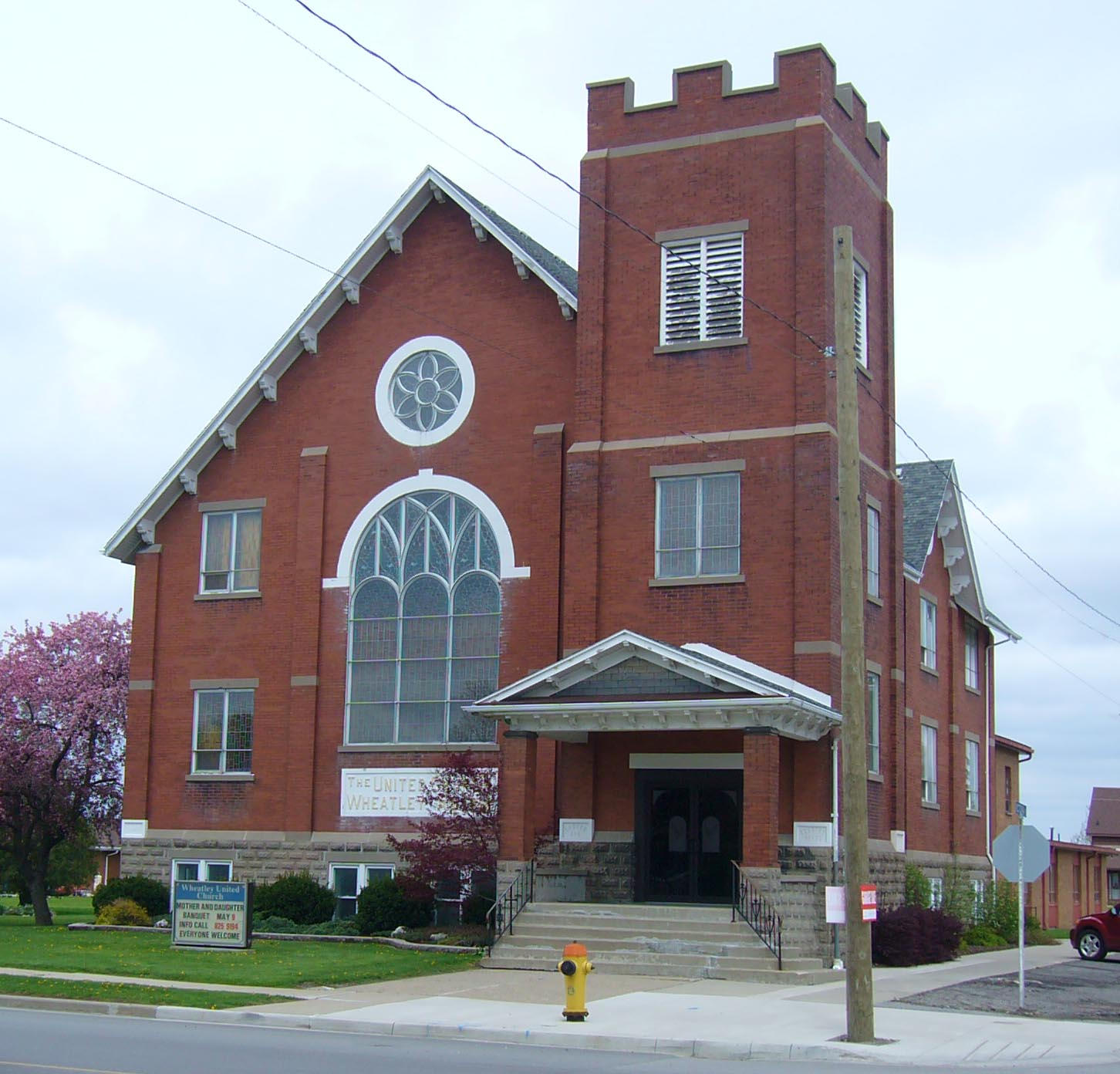
- Wheatley's United Church of Canada.

- Location within Municipality of Chatham-Kent Location within Southern Ontario
- Coordinates: 42°5′38″N 82°27′43″W
- Country: Canada
- Province: Ontario
- Municipality: Chatham-Kent

Area
  - Land: 3.94 km^{2} (1.52 sq mi)

Population (2021)
  - Total: 3,060
  - Density: 742.7/km^{2} (1,924/sq mi)
- Time zone: UTC-5 (EST)
  - Summer (DST): UTC-4 (EDT)
- Forward sortation area: N0P 2P0
- Area codes: 519 and 226
- NTS Map: 040J01
- GNBC Code: FDCUT

Wheatley is a community in Southwestern Ontario, Canada, within the municipality of Chatham-Kent. It lies about 12 kilometres (7 mi) east of Leamington. Nearby parks include Two Creeks Conservation Area, which has 15 km of hiking and bicycling paths, Kopegaron Woods Conservation Area, Hillman Marsh Conservation Area and Point Pelee National Park. Rondeau Provincial Park is only a forty-five-minute drive to the east. It also boasts Wheatley Provincial Park, home to the endangered Blue Racer snake, which can only be found in the park as well as the Point Pelee National Park and on Pelee Island.

The town has a few beaches, including Camper's Cove Campsite and beach which lies on the former Highway 3. As well as Holiday Harbour Resort on Pier Road. The town's population was 2,322 in 2006. As of 2016, the population was 2,868.

Wheatley is the primary community of licence for CHWI, a television station more popularly associated with the city of Windsor.

Wheatley's sign proclaims it as the "Freshwater Fish Capital of the World" and is home to a large fishing port located on Lake Erie. As such, Wheatley is home to many fisheries owned and operated by local families.

Hike Metal Products, a shipbuilding/refitting/fabricating company based at the harbour, is the builder of the Maid of the Mist, the vessel used at Niagara Falls for the tours under the great Canadian waterfall. It also built the 141-foot Copasetic, a research vessel, as well as a ferry for the Toronto Island Airport, to take passengers and vehicles from downtown Toronto to the Toronto Islands.

== History ==
Prior to the arrival of white settlers, the area was home to a population of indigenous people known as Neutrals, an Iroquoian tribe of the south. The indigenous Neutrals were experts in making arrowheads, spear points, and tomahawks. The flint beds located along the shores of Lake Erie were the source of the hard-stone building materials. The year 1818 saw the beginning of construction of the southwestern portion of Talbot Road. Col. Burwell, the chief surveyor, was hired by Col. Thomas Talbot (a British officer and land developer) to supervise the construction of the road which eventually stretched over 300 miles along the shoreline of Lake Erie. Following the completion of the road, settlers arrived and began taking up crown lands. The first settler, Wheatley, arrived from England.

Wheatley had been named "Pegtown" prior to the arrival of its first permanent settler Richard Wheatley who built a home on lot 218 Talbot trail in 1832. He was proceeded by such families as the Derbyshires, Lamarshs, Juliens and Ivisons most of whom can be found in directories and on local street signs in the area. Many speculate that the town was referred to as Pegtown due to the construction of homes on stilts/pegs due to the marshlands located near the lake. The origin of the name remain unclear as other theories exist. The name "Pegtown" was eventually discarded as Richard Wheatley's son in law, William Buchanan opened a post office (1865) and renamed the town in honor of its first permanent resident.

In 1913, the existing political structure of the village was deemed outdated. As a result, half of the town fell under the jurisdiction of Mersea Township in Essex County whilst the other fell under Romney Township in Kent County. A petition was presented to parliament on 19 February 1914 that resulted in Wheatley being approved as a village, located within Kent County. Twenty-five local residents met at Queen's Park for the final approval. The official birthday of the village is May 1, 1914. In 1999 the Conservative government mandated amalgamation of all Kent County municipalities with the City of Chatham as a province-wide plan to reduce costs. Thought was given to moving Wheatley to Essex County's jurisdiction but it became part of West Kent's riding along with Tilbury, Romney, Tilbury East, and the village of Merlin. A book about the town, Wheatley's Story, by Rita Lobzun, was published in 1982.

In June 2021, and again a month later, toxic hydrogen sulfide began leaking from the ground within Wheatley; this led to the installation of gas detectors. On August 26, the detectors sounded in the centre of town; as evacuation was in progress, a gas explosion occurred which destroyed buildings and seriously injured seven people. In November 2022, people and businesses affected by the explosion launched a proposed class action lawsuit against the Corporation of the Municipality of Chatham-Kent and HSE Integrated Ltd., which provided the gas involved in the explosion.

== Tourism ==
Wheatley hosts an annual "Fish Festival" each civic holiday weekend, the first weekend of August. Featured at the festival are the Big Boyz Fishing Derby, Smoked Fish Contest, Famous Yellow Perch and Broasted Chicken Dinner (all you can eat), Two Creeks Concerts, Parades, Wheatley Idol as well as other community events.

The town also celebrates St. John the Baptist celebration in June, as well as outdoor summer concerts located at Two Creeks Conservation Area every Sunday during the summer. Wheatley is located on the flight path for migratory birds and monarch butterflies and attracts birders from around the world annually.

== Elementary & sports ==
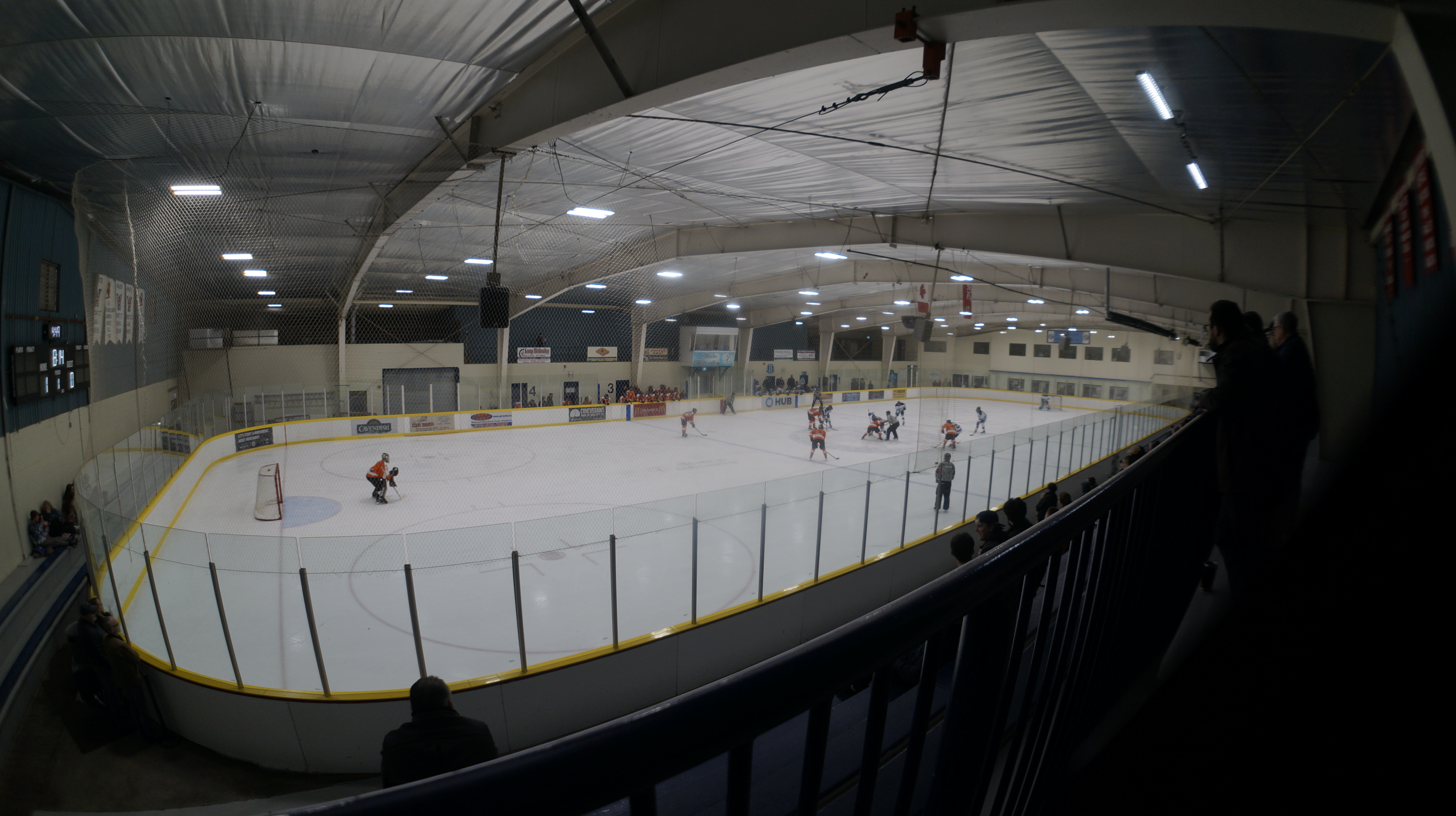
Wheatley Area Arena

Wheatley has an elementary public school, which hosts many different activities and sports. Wheatley has minor and senior soccer, sponsored by many local businesses.

Wheatley is home to a 9-hole golf course, Talbot Trail Golf Club, was originally named Rolling Acres Golf Club at its incorporation in 1964 until the name was changed in 1981.

Wheatley's arena, home to the Sharks hockey team, lies directly behind the public school.

== Downtown & around ==
Wheatley's downtown offers restaurants, the (temporarily closed) Royal Canadian Legion Branch 324, with its collection of militaria, post office, library and bank. Wheatley's Remembrance Day events take place on the library grounds, as do other ceremonies.
