= Hovercraft =

Air cushion vehicle

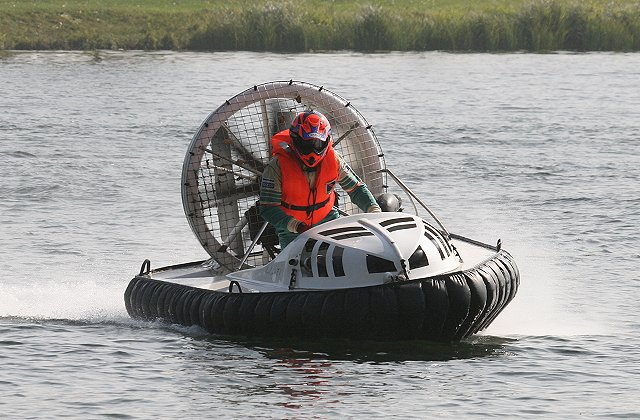
RLG-innovations eurocraft, a Formula 1 racing hovercraft

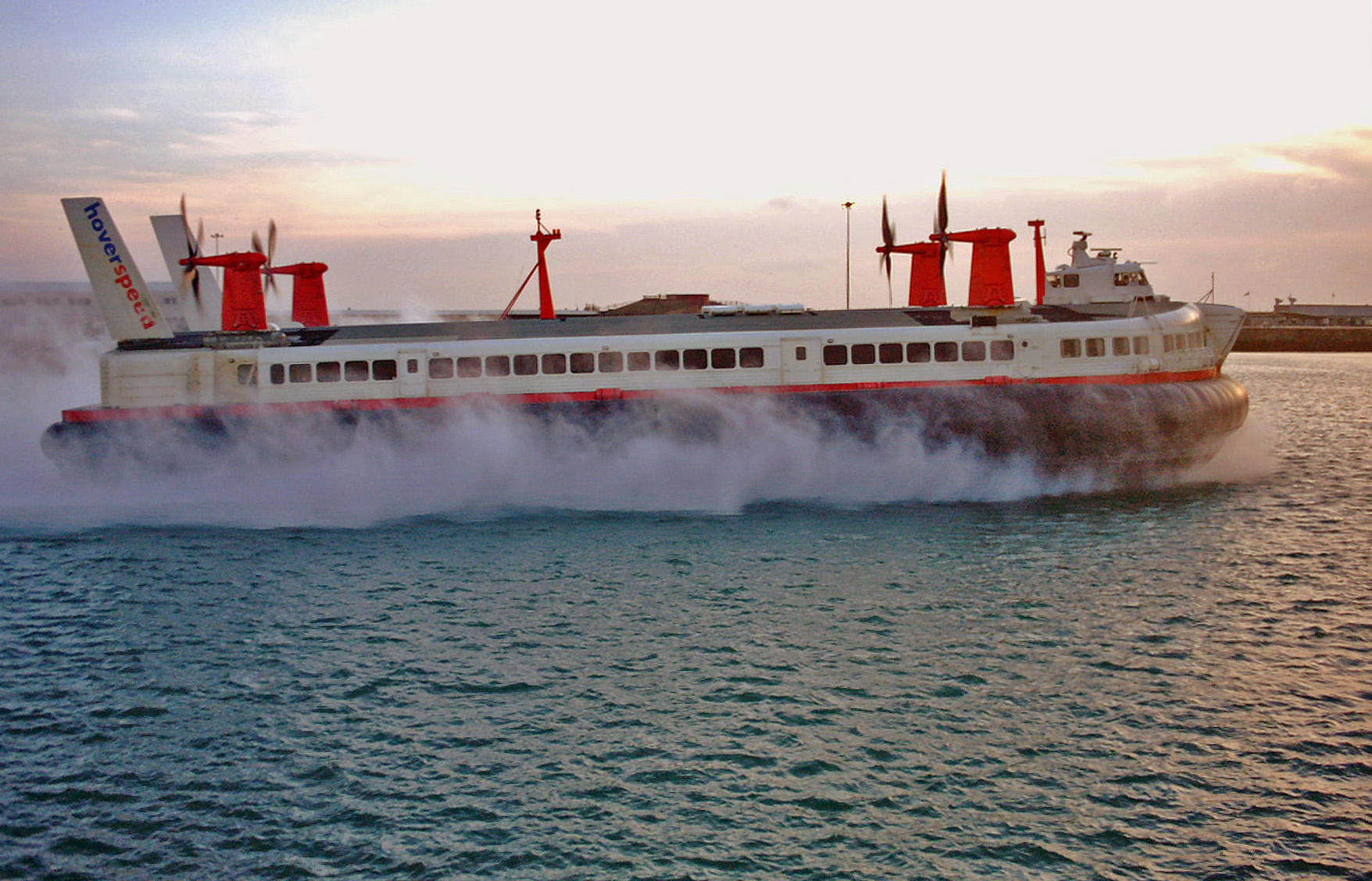
SR.N4 hovercraft arriving in Dover on its last commercial flight across the English Channel (1 October 2000)

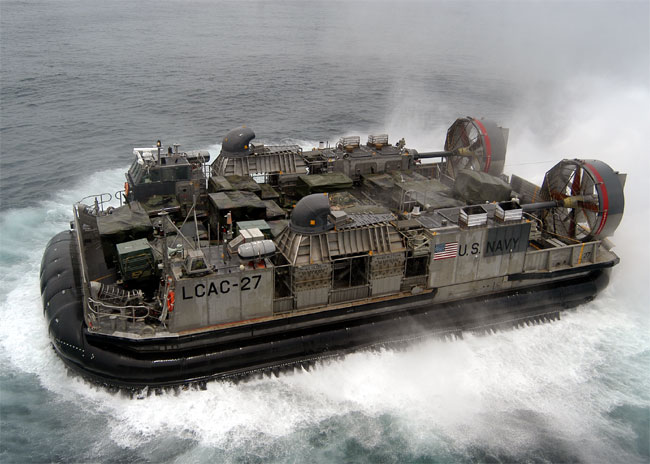
US Navy LCAC

A hovercraft (pl.: also hovercraft), also known as an air-cushion vehicle or ACV, is an amphibious craft capable of travelling over land, water, mud, ice, and various other surfaces.

Hovercraft use blowers to produce a large volume of air below the hull, or air cushion, that is slightly above atmospheric pressure. The pressure difference between the higher-pressure air below the hull and lower pressure ambient air above it produces lift, which causes the hull to float above the running surface. For stability reasons, the air is typically blown through slots or holes around the outside of a disk- or oval-shaped platform, giving most hovercraft a characteristic rounded-rectangle shape.

The first practical design for hovercraft was derived from a British invention in the 1950s. They are now used throughout the world as specialised transports in disaster relief, coastguard, military and survey applications, as well as for sport or passenger service. Very large versions have been used to transport hundreds of people and vehicles across the English Channel, whilst others have military applications used to transport tanks, soldiers and large equipment in hostile environments and terrain. Decline in public demand meant that as of 2025, only two year-round public hovercraft service in the world are still in operation: Hovertravel, which serves between the Isle of Wight and Southsea in the UK, and Oita Hovercraft resumed services in Oita, Japan in July 2025.

Although now a generic term for the type of craft, the name Hovercraft itself was a trademark owned by Saunders-Roe (later British Hovercraft Corporation (BHC), then Westland), hence other manufacturers' use of alternative names to describe the vehicles.

== History ==
=== Early efforts ===
There have been many attempts to understand the principles of high air pressure below hulls and wings. Hovercraft are unique in that they can lift themselves while still, differing from ground effect vehicles and hydrofoils that require forward motion to create lift.

The first mention, in the historical record of the concepts behind surface-effect vehicles, to use the term hovering was by Swedish scientist Emanuel Swedenborg in 1716.

The shipbuilder John Isaac Thornycroft patented an early design for an air cushion ship / hovercraft in the 1870s, but suitable, powerful, engines were not available until the 20th century.

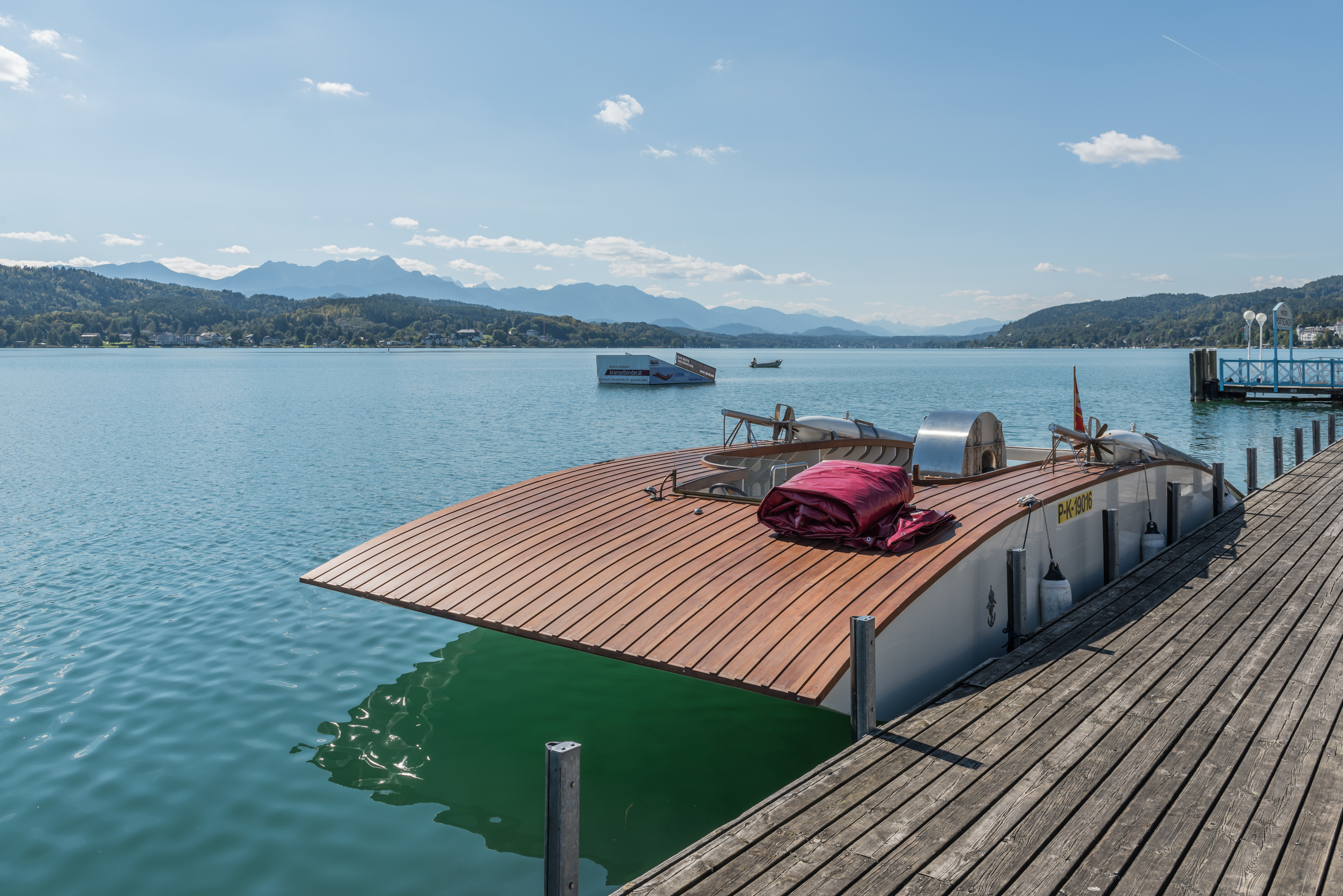
Luftkissengleitboot replica

In 1915, the Austrian Dagobert Müller von Thomamühl (1880–1956) built the world's first "air cushion" boat (Luftkissengleitboot). Shaped like a section of a large aerofoil (this creates a low-pressure area above the wing much like an aircraft), the craft was propelled by four aero engines driving two submerged marine propellers, with a fifth engine that blew air under the front of the craft to increase the air pressure under it. Only when in motion could the craft trap air under the front, increasing lift. The vessel also required a depth of water to operate and could not transition to land or other surfaces. Designed as a fast torpedo boat, the Versuchsgleitboot had a top speed of over 32 knots (59 km/h). It was thoroughly tested and even armed with torpedoes and machine guns for operation in the Adriatic. It never saw actual combat, however, and as the war progressed it was eventually scrapped due to a lack of interest and perceived need, and its engines returned to the air force.

The theoretical grounds for motion over an air layer were constructed by Konstantin Eduardovich Tsiolkovsky in 1926 and 1927.

In 1929, Andrew Kucher of Ford began experimenting with the Levapad concept, metal disks with pressurised air blown through a hole in the centre. Levapads do not offer stability on their own. Several must be used together to support a load above them. Lacking a skirt, the pads had to remain very close to the running surface. He initially imagined these being used in place of casters and wheels in factories and warehouses, where the concrete floors offered the smoothness required for operation. By the 1950s, Ford showed a number of toy models of cars using the system, but mainly proposed its use as a replacement for wheels on trains, with the Levapads running close to the surface of existing rails.

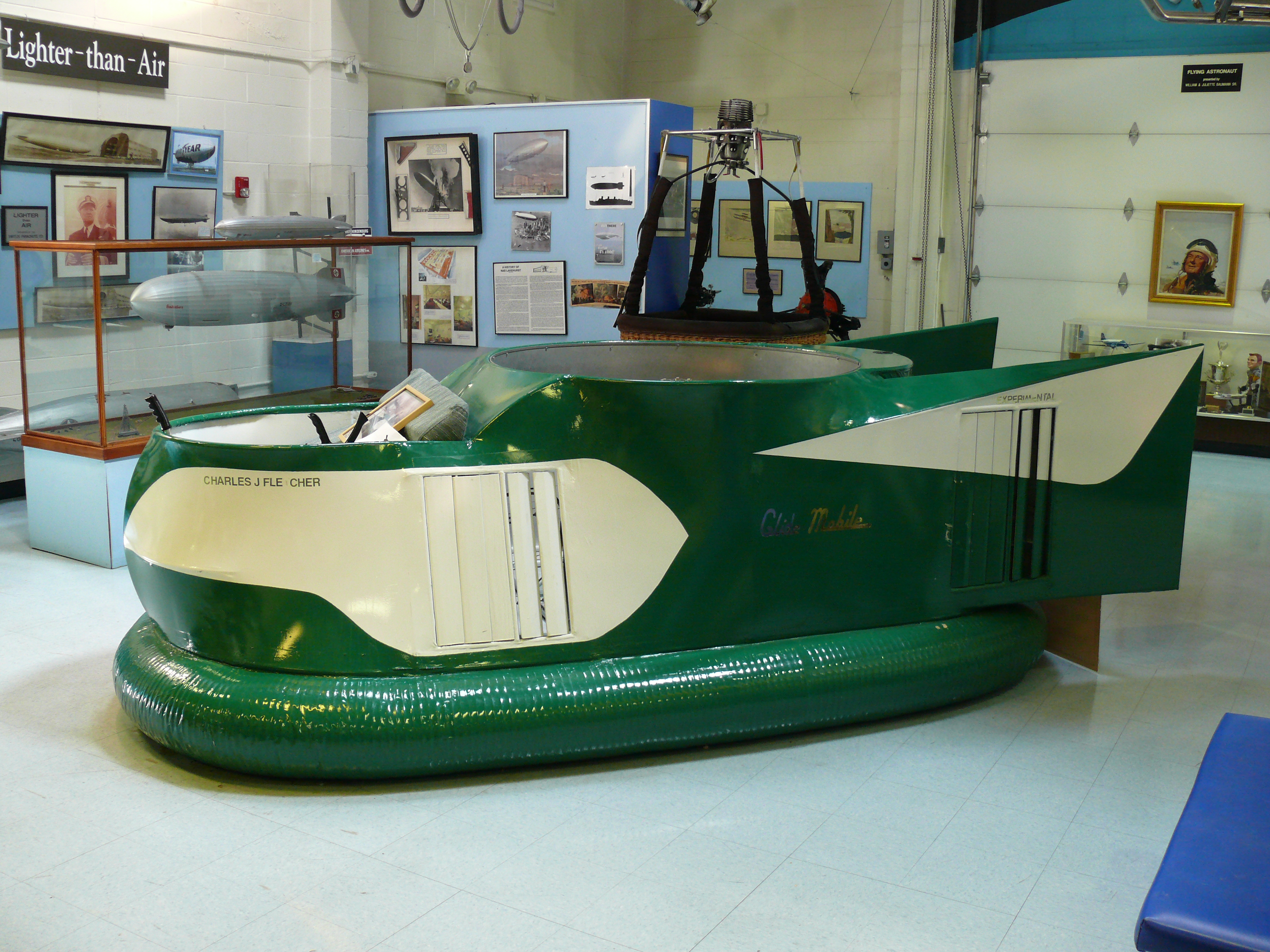
Charles Fletcher's Glidemobile in the Aviation Hall of Fame and Museum of New Jersey

In 1931, Finnish aero engineer Toivo J. Kaario began designing a developed version of a vessel using an air cushion and built a prototype Pintaliitäjä ('Surface Glider'), in 1937. His design included the modern features of a lift engine blowing air into a flexible envelope for lift. Kaario's efforts were followed closely in the Soviet Union by Vladimir Levkov, who returned to the solid-sided design of the Versuchsgleitboot. Levkov designed and built a number of similar craft during the 1930s, and his L-5 fast-attack boat reached 70 knots (130 km/h) in testing. However, the start of World War II put an end to his development work.

During World War II, an American engineer, Charles Fletcher, invented a walled air cushion vehicle, the Glidemobile. Because the project was classified by the US government, Fletcher could not file a patent.

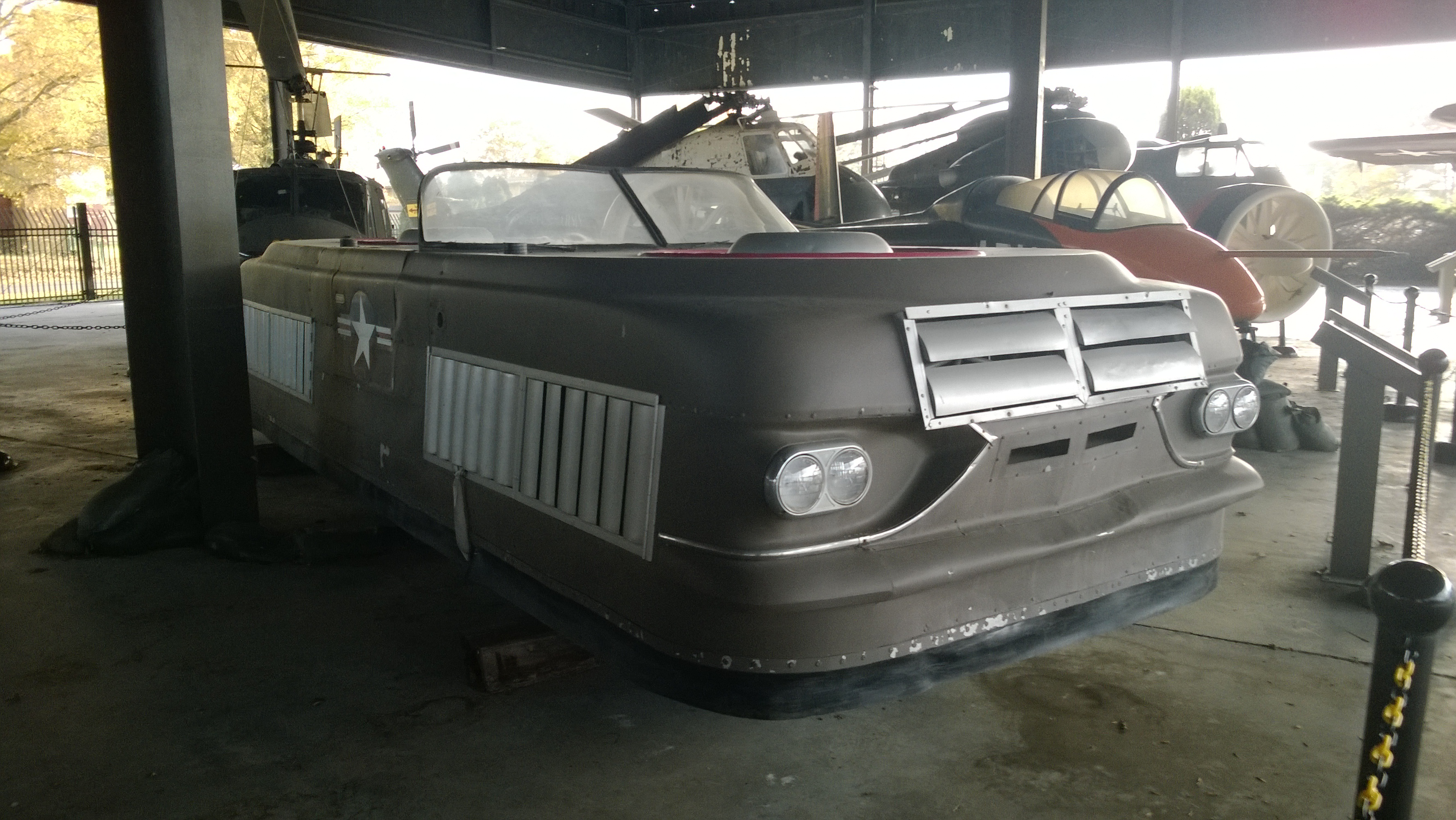
Curtiss-Wright Model 2500 Air Car, late 1950s

In April 1958, Ford engineers demonstrated the Glide-air, a one-metre (three-foot) model of a wheel-less vehicle that speeds on a thin film of air only 76.2 μm (3/1000 of an inch) above its tabletop roadbed. An article in Modern Mechanix quoted Andrew A. Kucher, Ford's vice president in charge of Engineering and Research noting "We look upon Glide-air as a new form of high-speed land transportation, probably in the field of rail surface travel, for fast trips of distances of up to about 1,600 kilometres (1,000 mi)".

In 1959, Ford displayed a hovercraft concept car, the Ford Levacar Mach I.

In August 1961, Popular Science reported on the Aeromobile 35B, an air-cushion vehicle (ACV) that was invented by William R. Bertelsen and was envisioned to revolutionise the transportation system, with personal hovering self-driving cars that could speed up to 2,400 km/h (1,500 mph).

=== Christopher Cockerell ===
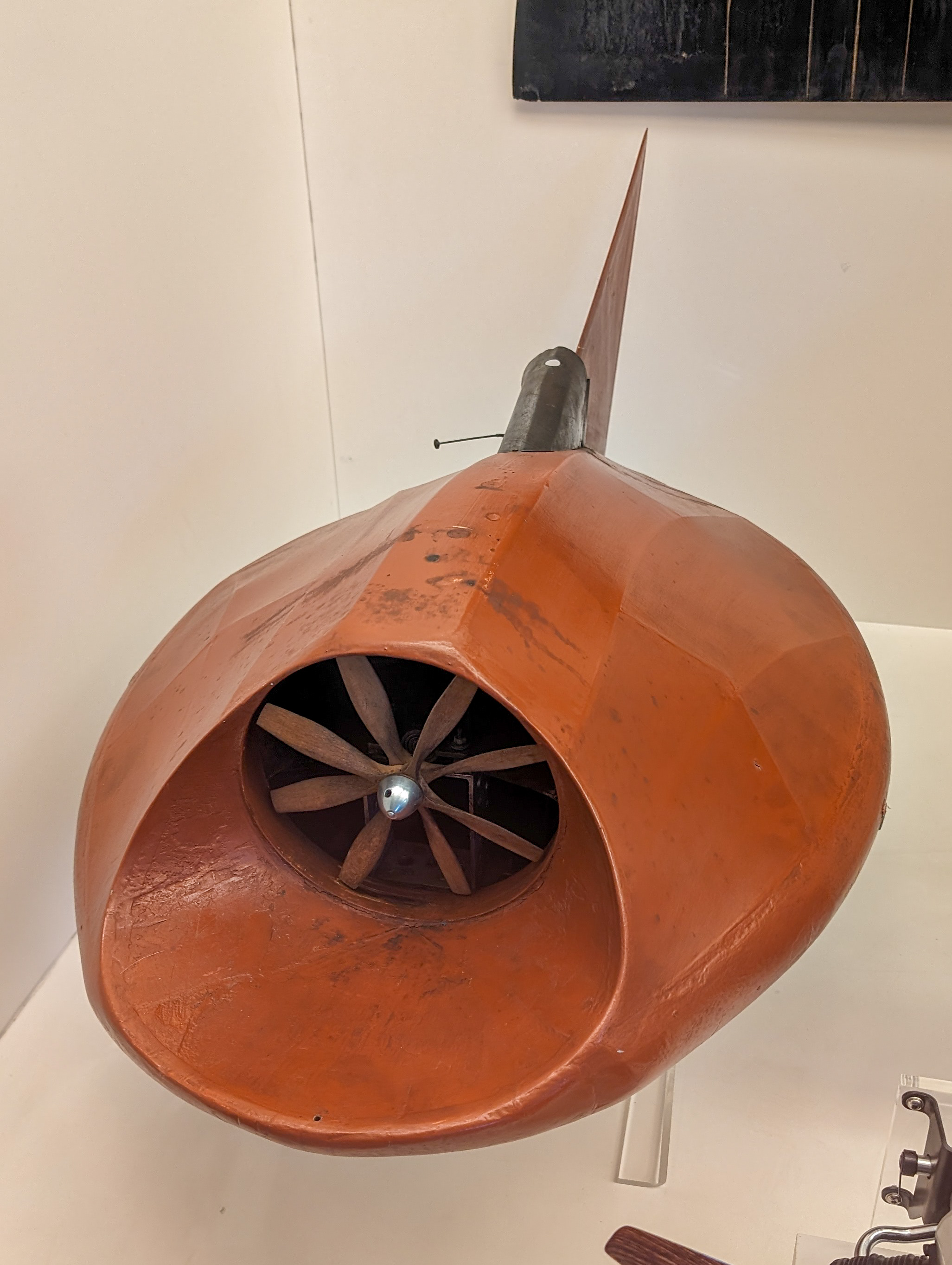
Cockerell's hovercraft model from 1955 in the Science Museum, London

The idea of the modern hovercraft is most often associated with Christopher Cockerell, a British mechanical engineer. Cockerell's group was the first to develop the use of a ring of air for maintaining the cushion, the first to develop a successful skirt, and the first to demonstrate a practical vehicle in continued use. A memorial to Cockerell's first design stands in the village of Somerleyton.

Cockerell came across the key concept in his design when studying the ring of airflow when high-pressure air was blown into the annular area between two concentric tin cans (one coffee and the other from cat food) and a hairdryer. This produced a ring of airflow, as expected, but he noticed an unexpected benefit as well; the sheet of fast-moving air presented a sort of physical barrier to the air on either side of it. This effect, which he called the "momentum curtain", could be used to trap high-pressure air in the area inside the curtain, producing a high-pressure plenum that earlier examples had to build up with considerably more airflow. In theory, only a small amount of active airflow would be needed to create lift and much less than a design that relied only on the momentum of the air to provide lift, like a helicopter. In terms of power, a hovercraft would only need between one quarter to one half of the power required by a helicopter.

Cockerell built and tested several models of his hovercraft design in Somerleyton, Suffolk, during the early 1950s. The design featured an engine mounted to blow from the front of the craft into a space below it, combining both lift and propulsion. He demonstrated the model flying over many Whitehall carpets in front of various government experts and ministers, and the design was subsequently put on the secret list. In spite of tireless efforts to arrange funding, no branch of the military was interested, as he later joked, "The Navy said it was a plane not a boat; the RAF said it was a boat not a plane; and the Army were 'plain not interested'."

=== SR.N1 ===
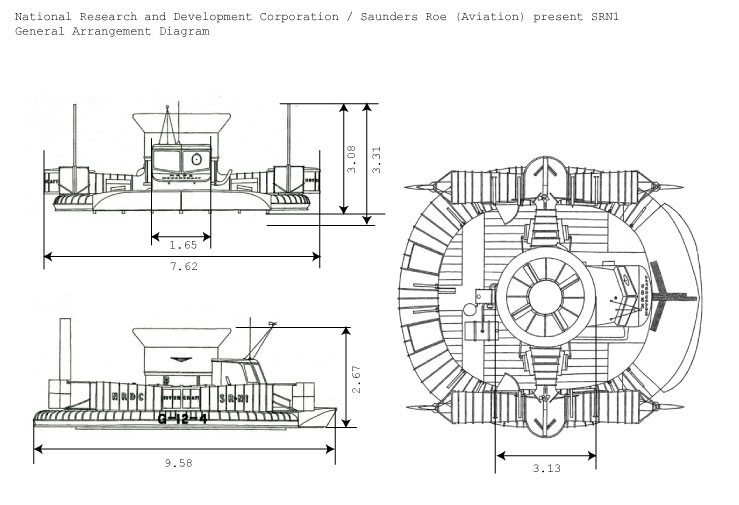
SR.N1 general arrangement

This lack of military interest meant that there was no reason to keep the concept secret, and it was declassified. Cockerell was finally able to convince the National Research Development Corporation to fund development of a full-scale model. In 1958, the NRDC placed a contract with Saunders-Roe for the development of what would become the SR.N1, short for "Saunders-Roe, Nautical 1".

The SR.N1 was powered by a 450 hp Alvis Leonides engine powering a vertical fan in the middle of the craft. In addition to providing the lift air, a portion of the airflow was bled off into two channels on either side of the craft, which could be directed to provide thrust. In normal operation this extra airflow was directed rearward for forward thrust and blew over two large vertical rudders that provided directional control. For low-speed manoeuvrability, the extra thrust could be directed fore or aft, differentially for rotation.

The SR.N1 made its first hover on 11 June 1959, and made its famed successful crossing of the English Channel on 25 July 1959. In December 1959, the Duke of Edinburgh visited Saunders-Roe at East Cowes and persuaded the chief test-pilot, Commander Peter Lamb, to allow him to take over the SR.N1's controls. He flew the SR.N1 so fast that he was asked to slow down a little. On examination of the craft afterwards, it was found that she had been dished in the bow due to excessive speed, damage that was never allowed to be repaired, and was from then on affectionately referred to as the 'Royal Dent'.

=== Skirts and other improvements ===
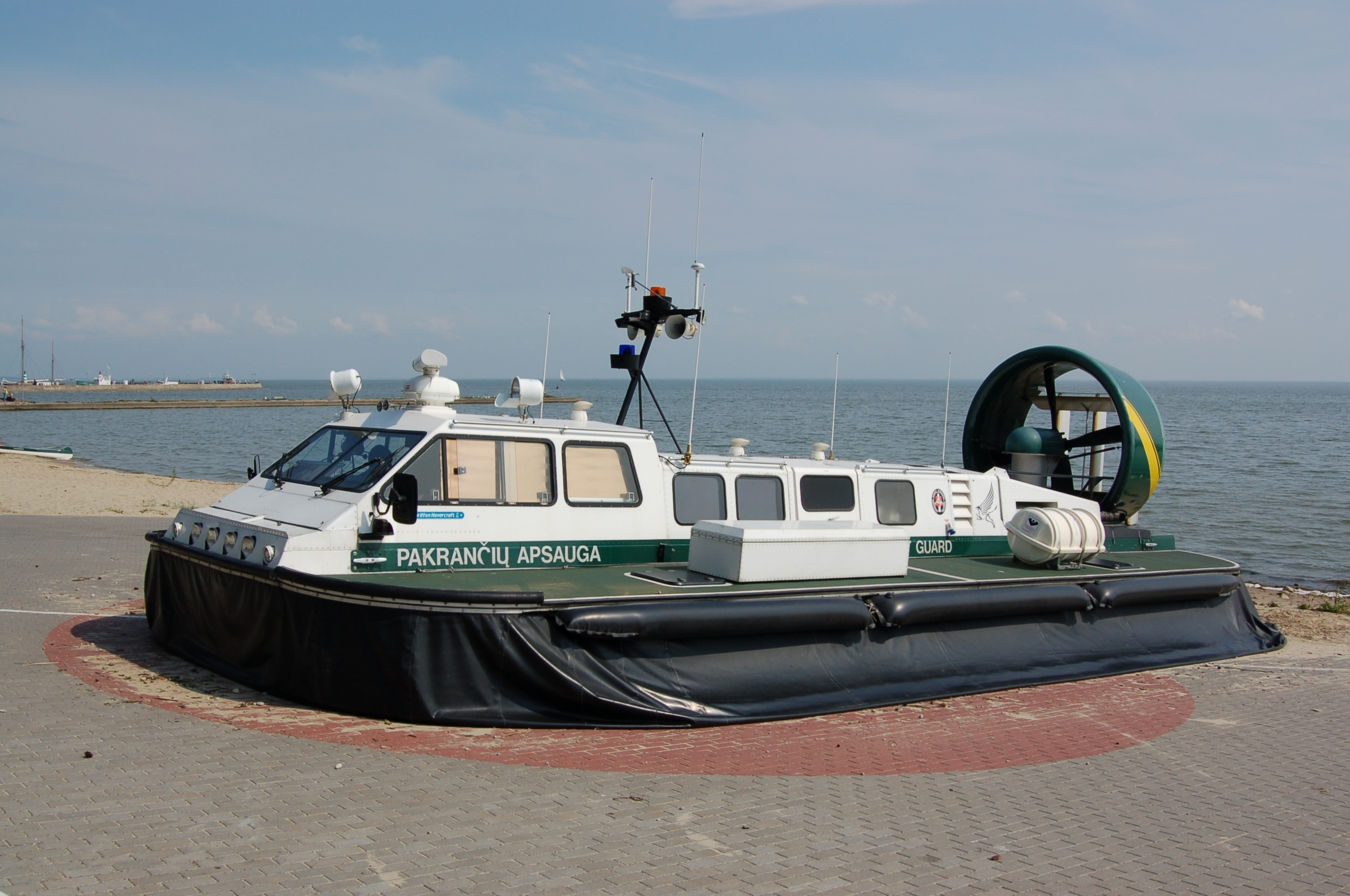
A Lithuanian Coast Guard Griffon Hoverwork 2000TD hovercraft with engine off and skirt deflated

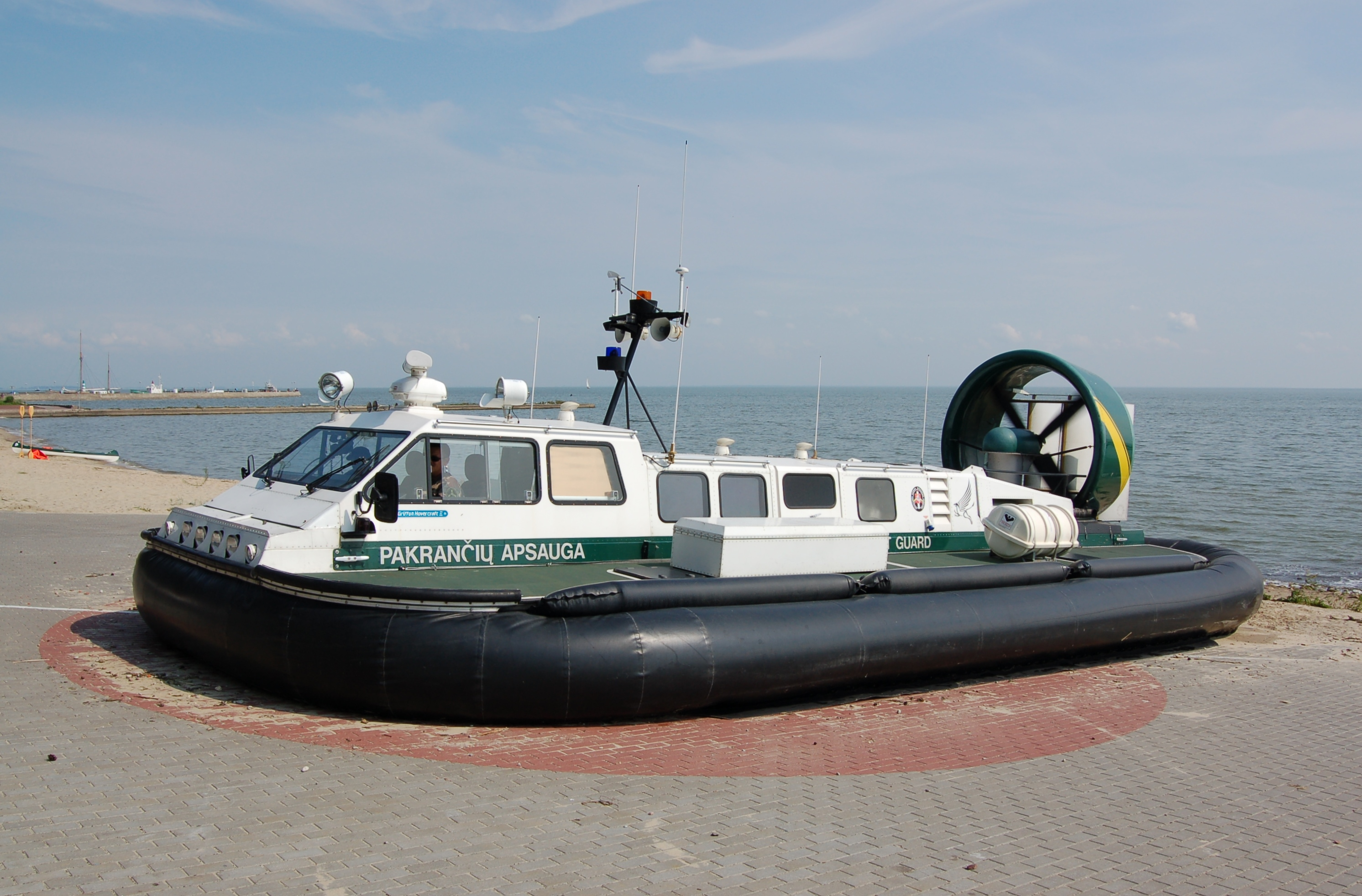
With engine on and skirt inflated

Testing quickly demonstrated that the idea of using a single engine to provide air for both the lift curtain and forward flight required too many trade-offs. A Blackburn Marboré turbojet for forward thrust and two large vertical rudders for directional control were added, producing the SR.N1 Mk II. A further upgrade with the Armstrong Siddeley Viper produced the Mk III. Further modifications, especially the addition of pointed nose and stern areas, produced the Mk IV.

Although the SR.N1 was successful as a testbed, the design hovered too close to the surface to be practical; at 9 inches (23 cm) even small waves would hit the bow. The solution was offered by Cecil Latimer-Needham, following a suggestion made by his business partner Arthur Ord-Hume. In 1958, he suggested the use of two rings of rubber to produce a double-walled extension of the vents in the lower fuselage. When air was blown into the space between the sheets it exited the bottom of the skirt in the same way it formerly exited the bottom of the fuselage, re-creating the same momentum curtain, but this time at some distance from the bottom of the craft.

Latimer-Needham and Cockerell devised a 4-foot (1.2 m) high skirt design, which was fitted to the SR.N1 to produce the Mk V, displaying hugely improved performance, with the ability to climb over obstacles almost as high as the skirt. In October 1961, Latimer-Needham sold his skirt patents to Westland, who had recently taken over Saunders Roe's interest in the hovercraft. Experiments with the skirt design demonstrated a problem; it was originally expected that pressure applied to the outside of the skirt would bend it inward, and the now-displaced airflow would cause it to pop back out. What actually happened is that the slight narrowing of the distance between the walls resulted in less airflow, which in turn led to more air loss under that section of the skirt. The fuselage above this area would drop due to the loss of lift at that point, and this led to further pressure on the skirt.

After considerable experimentation, Denys Bliss at Hovercraft Development Ltd. found the solution to this problem. Instead of using two separate rubber sheets to form the skirt, a single sheet of rubber was bent into a U shape to provide both sides, with slots cut into the bottom of the U forming the annular vent. When deforming pressure was applied to the outside of this design, air pressure in the rest of the skirt forced the inner wall to move in as well, keeping the channel open. Although there was some deformation of the curtain, the airflow within the skirt was maintained and the lift remained relatively steady. Over time, this design evolved into individual extensions over the bottom of the slots in the skirt, known as "fingers".

=== Commercialisation ===
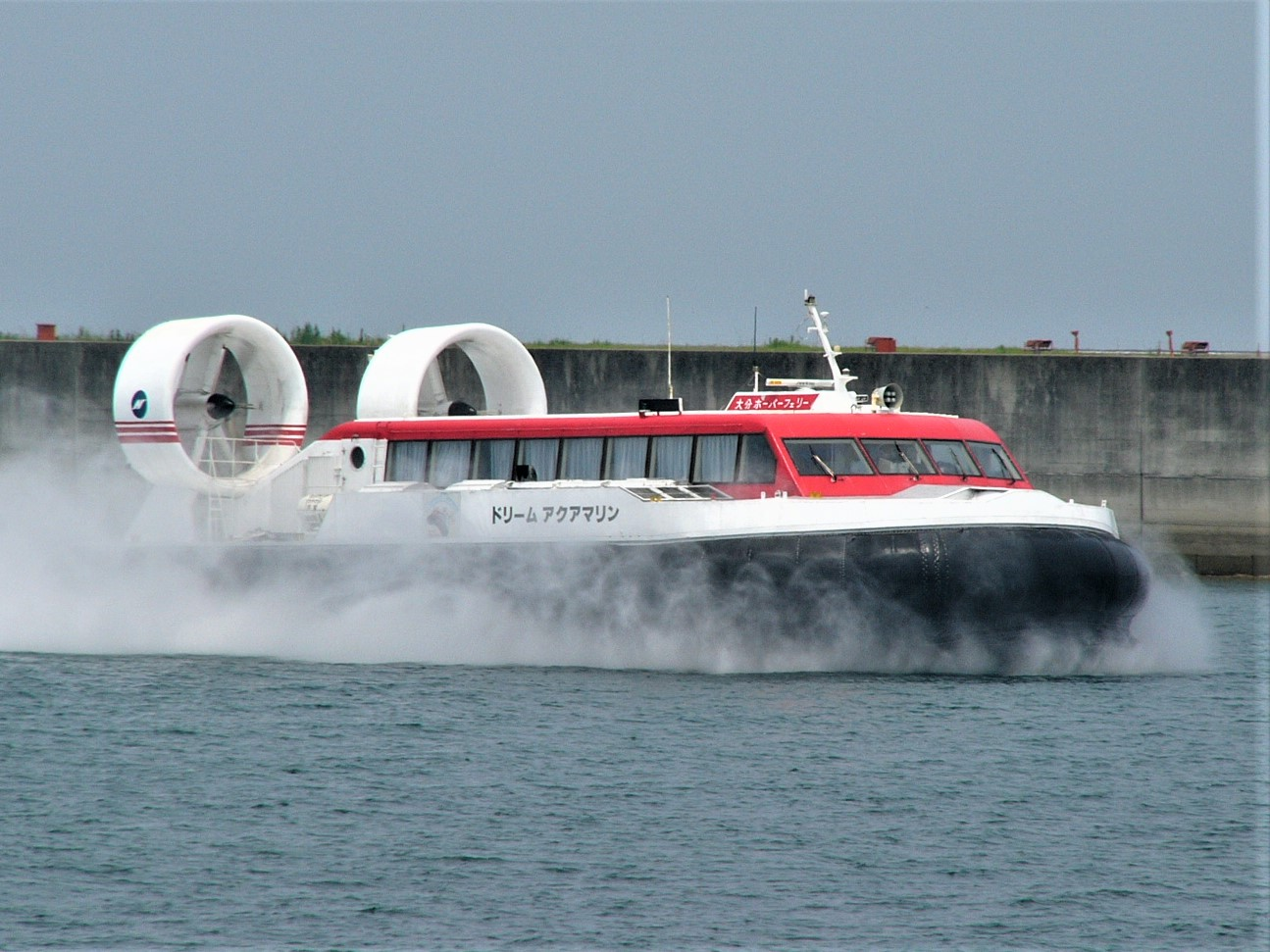
Passenger-carrying hovercraft, offshore from Ōita Airport in Japan

Through these improvements, the hovercraft became an effective transport system for high-speed service on water and land, leading to widespread developments for military vehicles, search and rescue, and commercial operations. By 1962, many UK aviation and shipbuilding firms were working on hovercraft designs, including Saunders Roe/Westland, Vickers-Armstrong, William Denny, Britten-Norman and Folland. Small-scale ferry service started as early as 1962 with the launch of the Vickers-Armstrongs VA-3. With the introduction of the 254 passenger and 30 car carrying SR.N4 cross-channel ferry by Hoverlloyd and Seaspeed in 1968, hovercraft had developed into useful commercial craft.

Hovercraft in the Netherlands, newsreel from 1976

Another major pioneering effort of the early hovercraft era was carried out by Jean Bertin's firm in France. Bertin was an advocate of the "multi-skirt" approach, which used a number of smaller cylindrical skirts instead of one large one in order to avoid the problems noted above. During the early 1960s he developed a series of prototype designs, which he called "terraplanes" if they were aimed for land use, and "naviplanes" for water. The best known of these designs was the N500 Naviplane, built for Seaspeed by the Société d'Etude et de Développement des Aéroglisseurs Marins (SEDAM). The N500 could carry 400 passengers, 55 cars and five buses. It set a speed record between Boulogne and Dover of 74 kn (137 km/h). It was rejected by its operators, who claimed that it was unreliable.

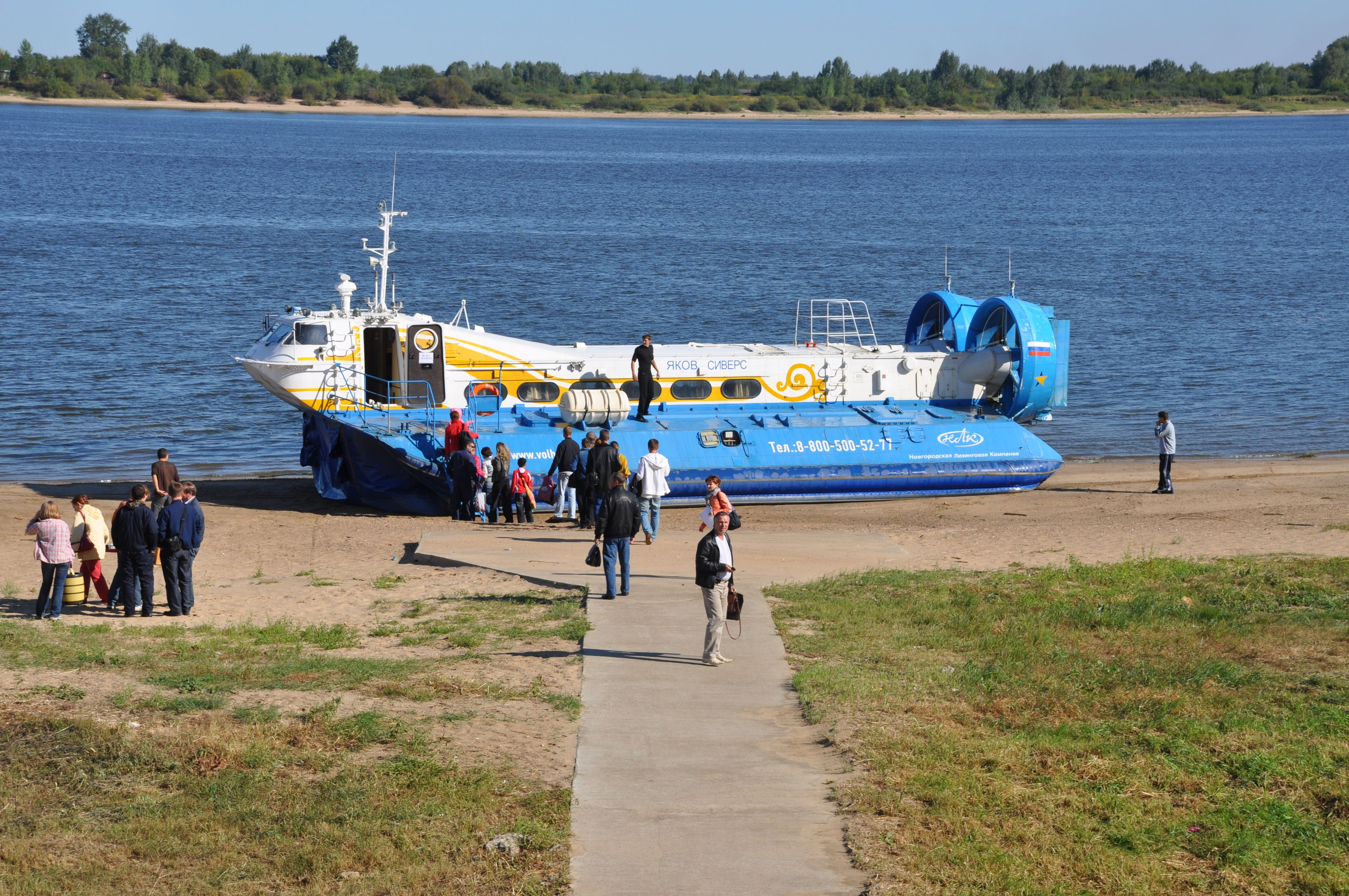
Russian-built Aerohod A48 hovercraft with passengers

Another discovery was that the total amount of air needed to lift the craft was a function of the roughness of the surface over which it travelled. On flat surfaces, like pavement, the required air pressure was so low that hovercraft were able to compete in energy terms with conventional systems like steel wheels. However, the hovercraft lift system acted as both a lift and a very effective suspension, and thus it naturally lent itself to high-speed use where conventional suspension systems were considered too complex. This led to a variety of "hovertrain" proposals during the 1960s, including England's Tracked Hovercraft and France's Aérotrain. In the US, Rohr Inc. and Garrett both took out licences to develop local versions of the Aérotrain. These designs competed with maglev systems in the high-speed arena, where their primary advantage was the very "low tech" tracks they needed. On the downside, the air blowing dirt and trash out from under the trains presented a unique problem in stations, and interest in them waned in the 1970s.

By the early 1970s, the basic concept had been well developed, and the hovercraft had found a number of niche roles where its combination of features were advantageous. Today, they are found primarily in military use for amphibious operations, search-and-rescue vehicles in shallow water, and sporting vehicles.

== Design and function ==
1. Propellers; 2. Air; 3. Fan; 4. Flexible skirt

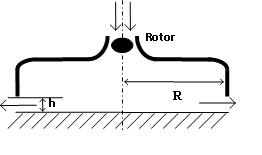
Schematic showing circular planform with radius R and hover height h

Hovercraft can be powered by one or more engines. Smaller craft, such as the SR.N6, usually have one engine with the drive split through a gearbox. On vehicles with several engines, one usually drives the fan (or impeller), which is responsible for lifting the vehicle by forcing air under the craft. The air inflates the "skirt" under the vehicle and causes it to rise above the surface. Additional engines provide thrust in order to propel the craft. Some hovercraft use ducting to allow one engine to perform both tasks by directing some of the air to the skirt, the rest of the air passing out of the back to push the craft forward.

=== Basic calculations ===
The minimum cavity overpressure p required to support a hovercraft with weight W and planform area A is simply W/A. With a circular planform this becomes:

$$p = { W \over \pi R^2 }$$

Using Bernoulli's principle with air of density ρ exiting the annular gap with (hovering) height h and circumference $2 \pi R$ at velocity V and assuming ideal conditions including firm ground and a level attitude:

$$p = { 1 \over 2} \rho V^2 \Rightarrow  V^2 = {2p \over \rho} = {2W \over \rho \pi R^2}$$

The conservation of mass gives the airflow Q:

$$Q=2\pi RhV  = 2 \pi Rh \sqrt {2W \over \rho \pi R^2 } = h \sqrt { 8 \pi W \over \rho }$$

As the minimum theoretical power is $P = Q p$ we have $Q = { P \over p}$ and with $p = {W \over \pi R^2 }$ we have:

$$Q =  { P \pi R^2 \over W}$$
and $h = {Q \over \sqrt {8 \pi W \over \rho}}= {P \pi R^2 \over W \sqrt {8 \pi W \over \rho}}$

from which the hovering height is obtained:

$$h= {P R^2 \sqrt{ \pi \rho} \over \sqrt {8 W^3}} \approx {0.63 \cdot P R^2 \rho^{1 \over 2} \over W^{3 \over 2}}$$

This must be multiplied with the efficiency of the blower. The minimal theoretical power is therefore:

$$P \approx {1.6 \cdot h W^{3 \over 2} \over R^2 \rho^{1 \over 2} }$$

from which it is seen that the required power is proportional to the hovering height and becomes smaller for lighter and for larger hovercraft.

Similar expressions can be derived for general cushion planforms with area A and circumference C:

$$h=P \sqrt {\rho A^3 \over 2 C^2 W^3}$$
and $P={h / \sqrt {\rho A^3 \over 2 C^2 W^3}}$

Using the SR.N6 as a worked example with rounded values W = 107 kN, A = 140 m^{2}, C = 50 m, and P = 780 kW, h equates to ~0.57 m with this formula, or ~0.29 m if it is assumed that half the engine's power is used for propulsion. This is reasonable as best possible value but is lower in practice, because the result must be multiplied with fan efficiency and frictional losses are incurred where the air blows out when hovering. In addition, when hovering on water, the air cushion pressure depresses the water surface by the same amount, in this example about 765 Pa ≈ 78 mm of water.

Once hovering, more power is required to move the craft forward against the sum of various resistances. In the minimum this is due to the form drag described by the drag equation and multiplied again by the forward speed v:
$$P =\, \tfrac12\, \rho\, v^3\, c_{\rm d}\, A_{\rm frontal}$$
Assuming 0.3 for the drag coefficient $c_{\rm d}\$ of the relatively streamlined SR.N6 and 30 m^{2} for its frontal area, at least 115 kW are needed at its top speed of 50 kn, and this must be divided by its propeller and drive train efficiencies to get the required engine power. There is also some aerodynamic friction between the moving air cushion and the ground, but this is small in comparison.

Over water there are additional resistance components. The water surface is depressed as from a flat solid hull and the moving depression creates water waves in a similar manner as a boat does. This wave drag increases with speed up to a so-called hump at a Froude number of about 0.35 and again 0.6, in deep water. Above this speed the wave drag decreases strongly as with planing boats. The SR.N6 for example could have humps at 9 and 15 kn. If there are natural, wind-induced waves, a hovercraft will respond with a heave characteristic and also lose more air from its cushion in the wave troughs. Finally, head winds and waves slapping the skirt and spray represent additional resistances. In all considerably more engine power is required than calculations for best conditions.

=== Power requirements in practice and efficiency ===
The values of installed engine power are available for many hovercraft and can be divided by their all-up weights or masses for comparison, keeping the units used in mind. Single-seaters documented by the Hover Club of Great Britain typically weigh 0.2-0.3 t and mostly have separate engines for hovering and propulsion totalling about 30-50 kW giving around ~150 kW/t, at maximum power. The SR.N6 with data given has ~72 and the large SR.N4 Mk III with its 320 t and 2800 kW ~8.8 kW/t. Bigger is more efficient. The specific power demand for hovercraft in relation to their speeds can also be plotted in a von Kármán–Gabrielli diagram.

=== Power sources ===
Most engines are powered by fossil fuels yet small electric and hybrid hovercraft are being developed and prototypes have been demonstrated.

At least three human-powered hovercraft have been demonstrated for limited durations. The first, using sidewalls, covered 100 m (330 ft) over water at 5.9 m/s (19.4 ft/s) in 1988. A more recent one was Steamboat Willy in use from 2002 until at least 2016. It was able to start hovering from rest on smooth ground with almost any rider, and on water, travel at running speed, and transfer from land to water down a slip or beach (see videos 2 and 4). Hovering from water to land was only possible on very flat terrain because air propellers become relatively inefficient at slow speeds and when strongly loaded, as when travelling up an incline.

== Uses ==
=== Commercial ===
The British aircraft and marine engineering company Saunders-Roe built the first practical human-carrying hovercraft for the National Research Development Corporation, the SR.N1, which carried out several test programmes in 1959 to 1961 (the first public demonstration was in 1959), including a cross-channel test run in July 1959, piloted by Peter "Sheepy" Lamb, an ex-naval test pilot and the chief test pilot at Saunders Roe. Christopher Cockerell was on board, and the flight took place on the 50th anniversary of Louis Blériot's first aerial crossing.

The SR.N1 was driven by expelled air, powered by a single piston engine. Demonstrated at the Farnborough Airshow in 1960, it was shown that this simple craft can carry a load of up to 12 marines with their equipment as well as the pilot and co-pilot with only a slight reduction in hover height proportional to the load carried. The SR.N1 did not have any skirt, using instead the peripheral air principle that Cockerell had patented. It was later found that the craft's hover height was improved by the addition of a skirt of flexible fabric or rubber around the hovering surface to contain the air. The skirt was an independent invention made by a Royal Navy officer, C.H. Latimer-Needham, who sold his idea to Westland (by then the parent of Saunders-Roe's helicopter and hovercraft interests), and who worked with Cockerell to develop the idea further.

The first passenger-carrying hovercraft to enter service was the Vickers-Armstrongs VA-3, which, in the summer of 1962, carried passengers regularly along the north Wales coast from Moreton, Merseyside, to Rhyl. It was powered by two turboprop aero-engines and driven by propellers.

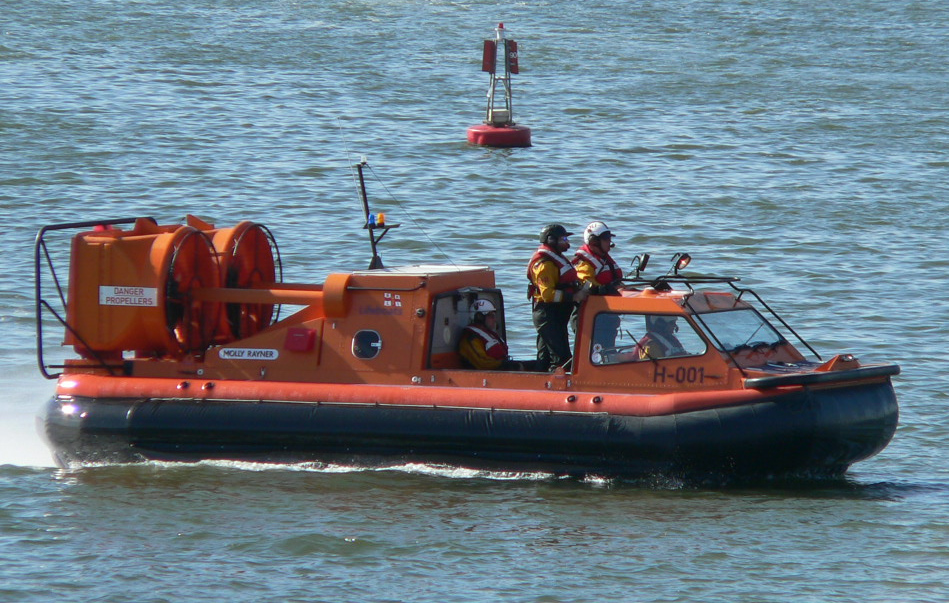
In Britain, the Royal National Lifeboat Institution operates a small fleet of hovercraft lifeboats.

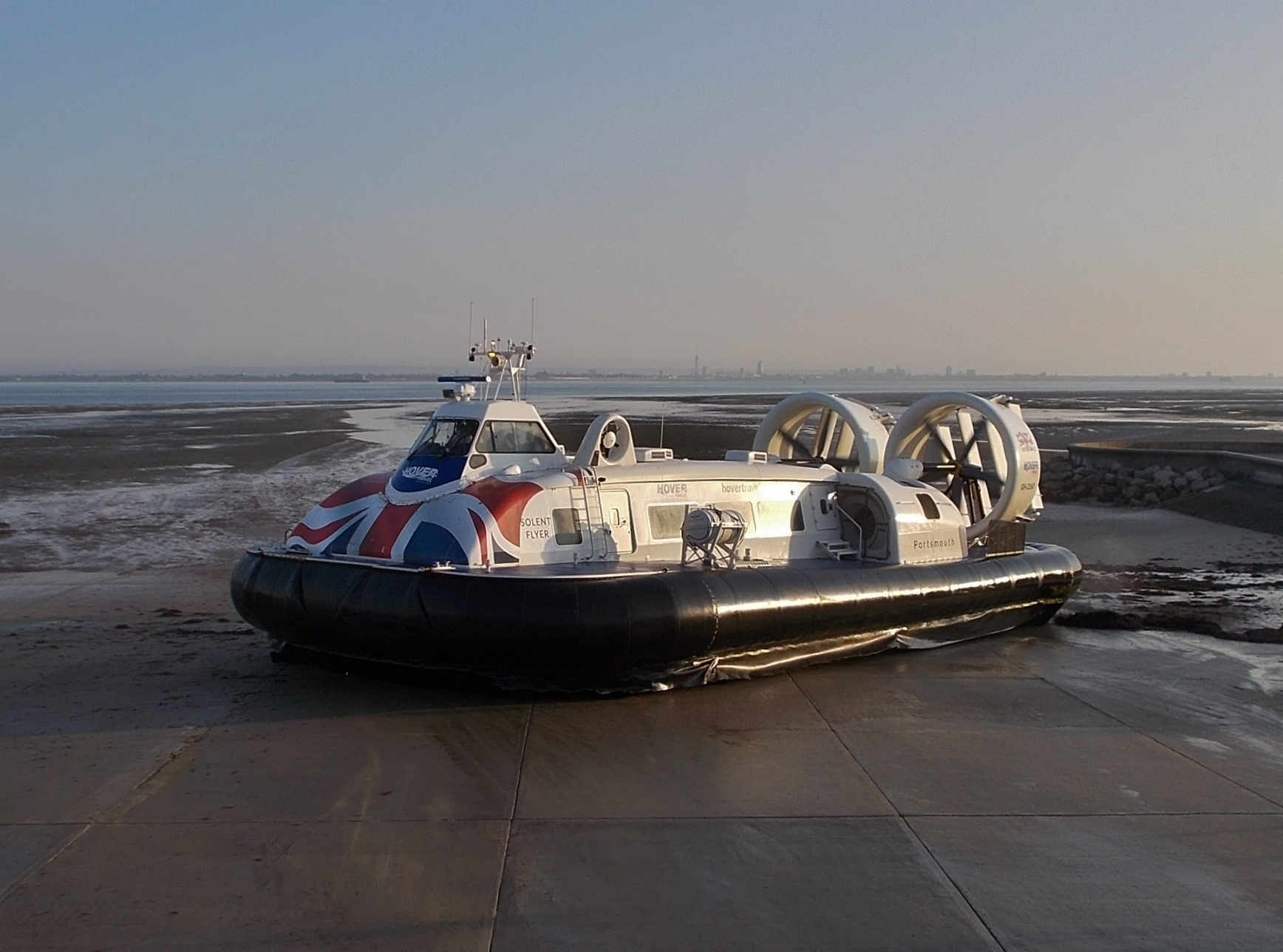
The Hovertravel service uses the Griffon Hoverwork 12000TD between the Isle of Wight and mainland England and, as of 2023, is the only scheduled public hovercraft service in the world. Solent Flyer is shown here at Ryde.

During the 1960s, Saunders-Roe developed several larger designs that could carry passengers, including the SR.N2, which operated across the Solent, in 1962, and later the SR.N6, which operated across the Solent from Southsea to Ryde on the Isle of Wight for many years. In 1963 the SR.N2 was used in experimental service between Weston-super-Mare and Penarth under the aegis of P & A Campbell, the paddle steamer operators.

Operations by Hovertravel commenced on 24 July 1965, using the SR.N6, which carried 38 passengers. Two 98 seat AP1-88 hovercraft were introduced on this route in 1983, and in 2007, these were joined by the first 130-seat BHT130 craft. The AP1-88 and the BHT130 were notable as they were largely built by Hoverwork using shipbuilding techniques and materials (i.e. welded aluminium structure and diesel engines) rather than the aircraft techniques used to build the earlier craft built by Saunders-Roe-British Hovercraft Corporation. Over 20 million passengers had used the service as of 2004 – the service is still operating (as of 2020) and is by far the longest, continuously operated hovercraft service.

In 1966, two cross-channel passenger hovercraft services were inaugurated using SR.N6 hovercraft. Hoverlloyd ran services from Ramsgate Harbour, England, to Calais, France, and Townsend Ferries also started a service to Calais from Dover, which was soon superseded by that of Seaspeed.

As well as Saunders-Roe and Vickers (which combined in 1966 to form the British Hovercraft Corporation (BHC)), other commercial craft were developed during the 1960s in the UK by Cushioncraft (part of the Britten-Norman Group) and Hovermarine based at Woolston (the latter being sidewall hovercraft, where the sides of the hull projected down into the water to trap the cushion of air with normal hovercraft skirts at the bow and stern). One of these models, the HM-2, was used by Red Funnel between Southampton (near the Woolston Floating Bridge) and Cowes.

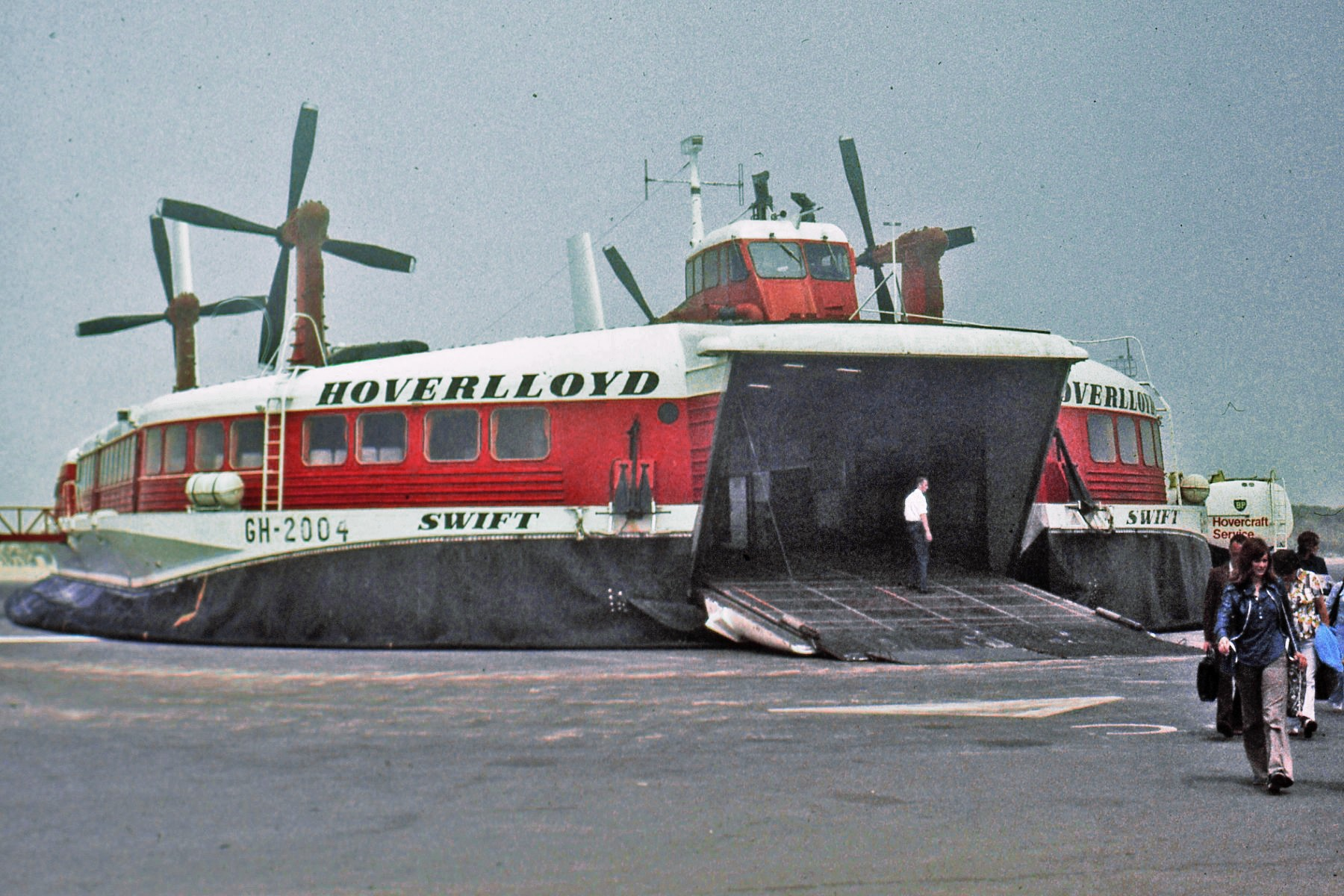
The Hoverlloyd SR.N4 craft Swift GH-2004 on the pad at Pegwell Bay Hoverport, 1973

The world's first car-carrying hovercraft was made in 1968, the BHC Mountbatten class (SR.N4) models, each powered by four Bristol Proteus turboshaft engines. These were both used by rival operators Hoverlloyd and Seaspeed (which joined to form Hoverspeed in 1981) to operate regular car and passenger carrying services across the English Channel. Hoverlloyd operated from Ramsgate, where a special hoverport had been built at Pegwell Bay, to Calais. Seaspeed operated from Dover, England, to Calais and Boulogne in France. The first SR.N4 had a capacity of 254 passengers and 30 cars, and a top speed of 83 kn (154 km/h). The channel crossing took around 30 minutes and was run like an airline with flight numbers. The later SR.N4 Mk.III had a capacity of 418 passengers and 60 cars. These were later joined by the French-built SEDAM N500 Naviplane with a capacity of 385 passengers and 45 cars; only one entered service and was used intermittently for a few years on the cross-channel service until returned to SNCF in 1983. The service ceased on 1 October 2000 after 32 years, due to competition with traditional ferries, catamarans, the disappearance of duty-free shopping within the EU, the advancing age of the SR.N4 hovercraft, and the opening of the Channel Tunnel.

The commercial success of hovercraft suffered from rapid rises in fuel prices during the late 1960s and 1970s, following conflict in the Middle East. Alternative over-water vehicles, such as wave-piercing catamarans (marketed as the SeaCat in the UK until 2005), use less fuel and can perform most of the hovercraft's marine tasks. Although developed elsewhere in the world for both civil and military purposes, except for the Solent Ryde-to-Southsea crossing, hovercraft disappeared from the coastline of Britain until a range of Griffon Hoverwork were bought by the Royal National Lifeboat Institution.

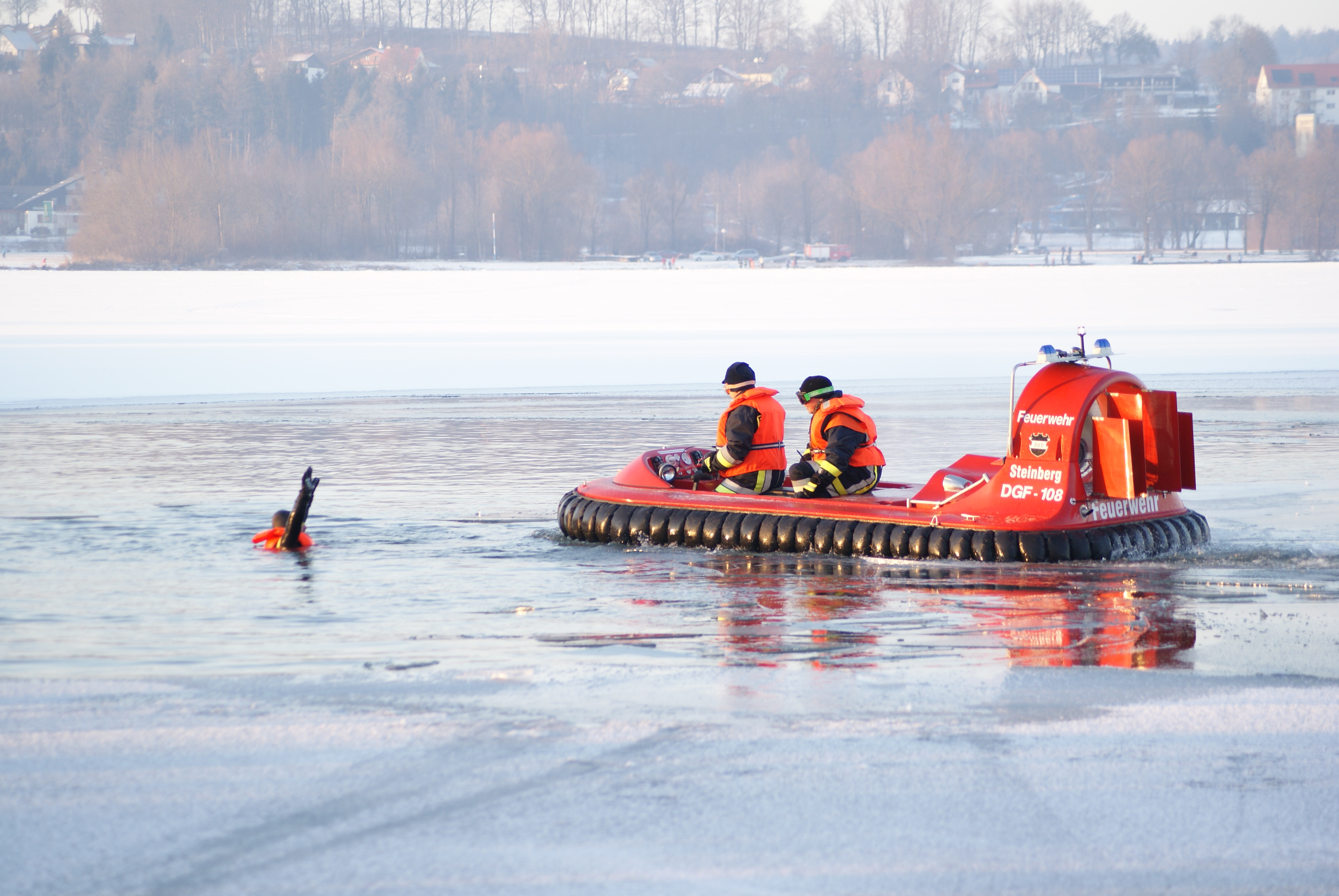
A volunteer fire department in Bavaria using a hovercraft to practise a rescue

Hovercraft were used to travel between the Gateway of India in Mumbai and CBD Belapur and Vashi in Navi Mumbai between 1994 and 1999, but the services were subsequently stopped due to the lack of sufficient water transport infrastructure.

=== Civilian non-commercial ===
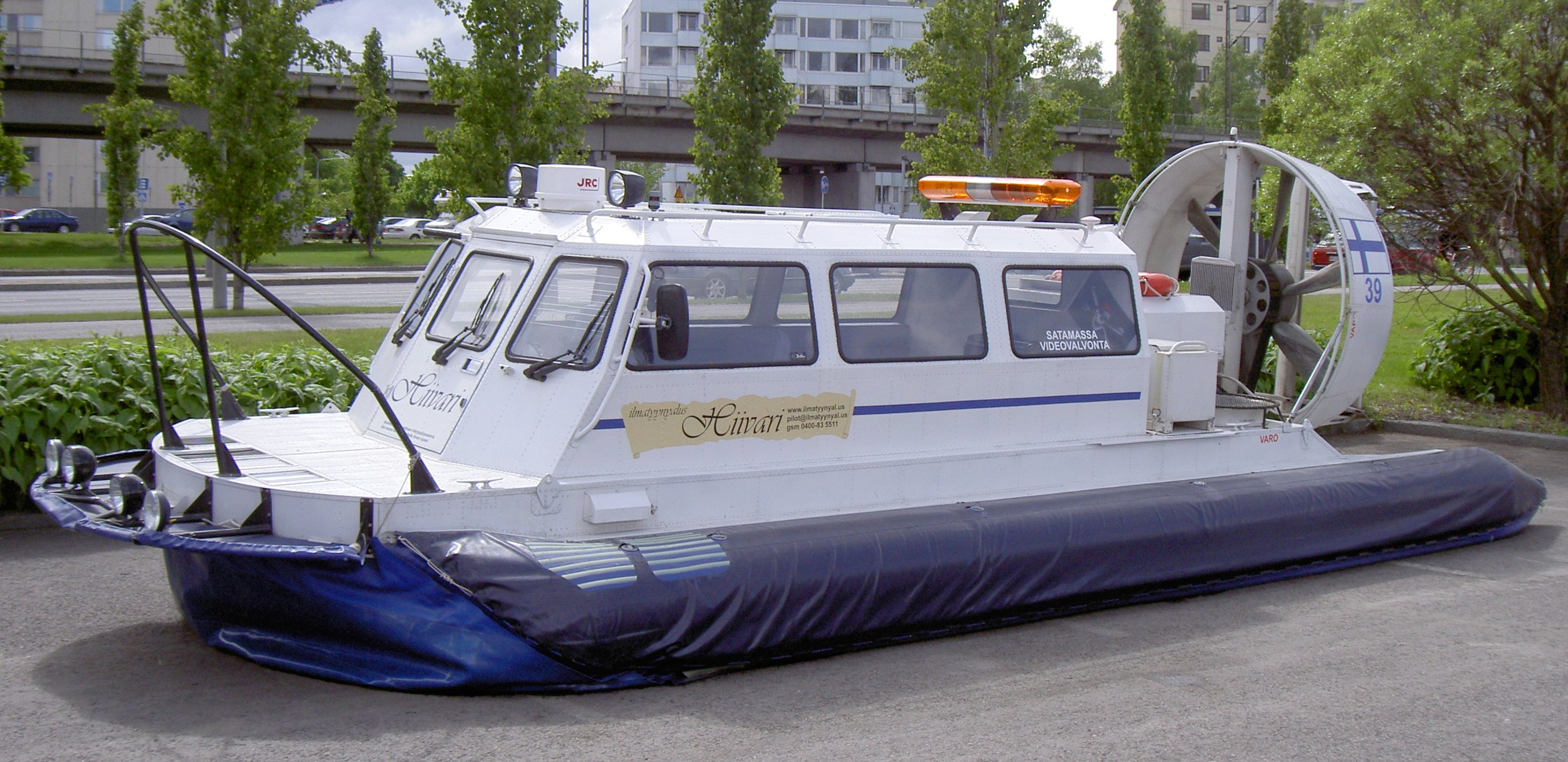
Russian-built hovercraft "Hiivari" in Tampere, Finland

In Finland, small hovercraft are widely used in maritime rescue and during the rasputitsa ("mud season") as archipelago liaison vehicles. In England, hovercraft of the Burnham-on-Sea Area Rescue Boat (BARB) are used to rescue people from thick mud in Bridgwater Bay. Avon Fire and Rescue Service became the first Local Authority fire service in the UK to operate a hovercraft. It is used to rescue people from thick mud in the Weston-super-Mare area and during times of inland flooding. A Griffon rescue hovercraft has been in use for a number of years with the Airport Fire Service at Dundee Airport in Scotland. It is used in the event of an aircraft ditching in the Tay estuary. Numerous fire departments around the US/Canadian Great Lakes operate hovercraft for water and ice rescues, often of ice fisherman stranded when ice breaks off from shore. The Canadian Coast Guard uses hovercraft to break light ice.

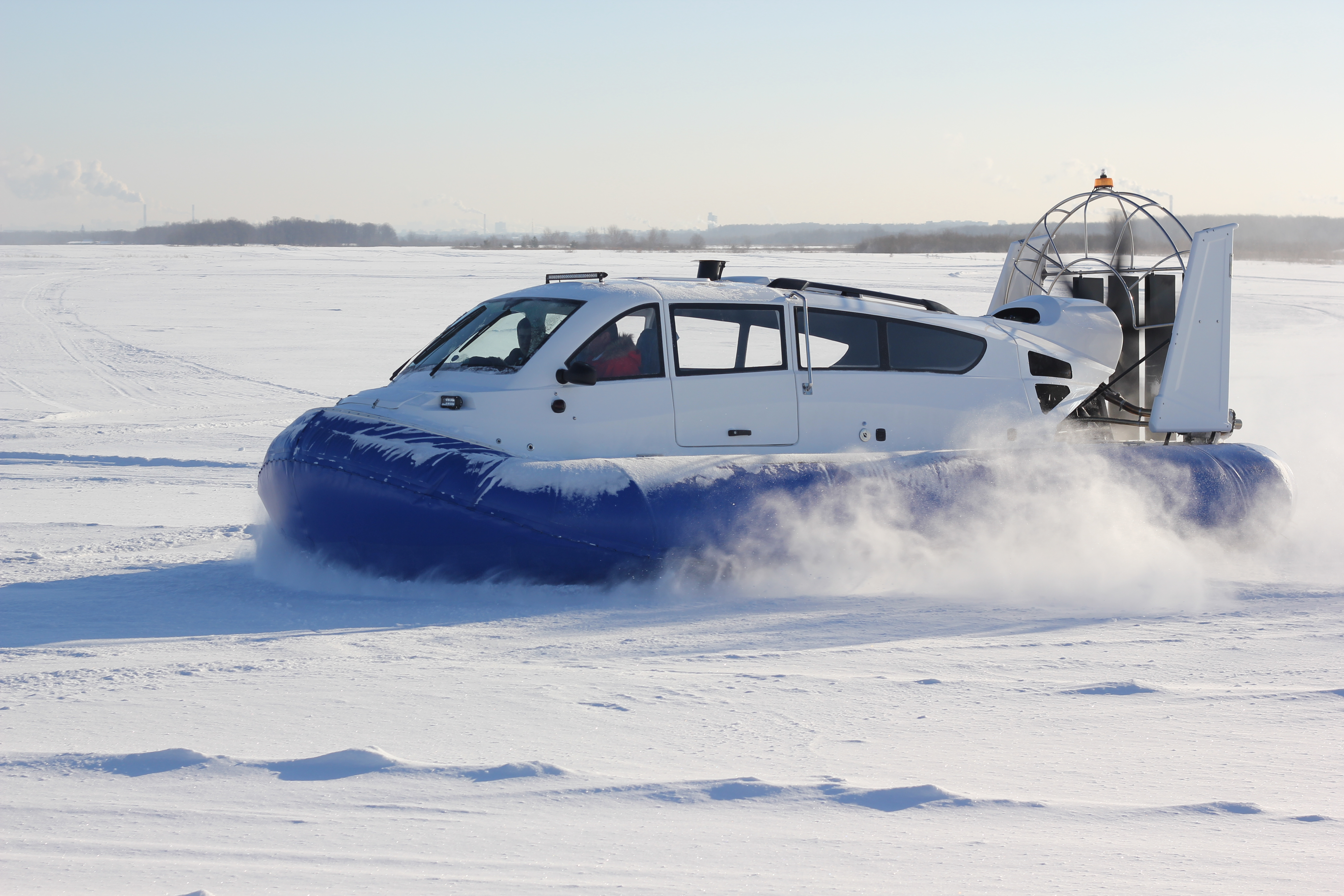
Multipurpose civilian hovercraft Kaiman-10

In October 2008, The Red Cross commenced a flood-rescue service hovercraft based in Inverness, Scotland. Gloucestershire Fire and Rescue Service received two flood-rescue hovercraft donated by Severn Trent Water following the 2007 UK floods.

Since 2006, hovercraft have been used in aid in Madagascar by HoverAid, an international NGO who use the hovercraft to reach the most remote places on the island.

The Scandinavian airline SAS used to charter an AP1-88 hovercraft for regular passengers between Copenhagen Airport, Denmark, and the SAS Hovercraft Terminal in Malmö, Sweden.

In 1998, the US Postal Service began using the British built Hoverwork AP1-88 to haul mail, freight, and passengers from Bethel, Alaska, to and from eight small villages along the Kuskokwim River. Bethel is far removed from the Alaska road system, thus making the hovercraft an attractive alternative to the air based delivery methods used prior to introduction of the hovercraft service. Hovercraft service is suspended for several weeks each year while the river is beginning to freeze to minimise damage to the river ice surface. The hovercraft is able to operate during the freeze-up period; however, this could potentially break the ice and create hazards for villagers using their snowmobiles along the river during the early winter.

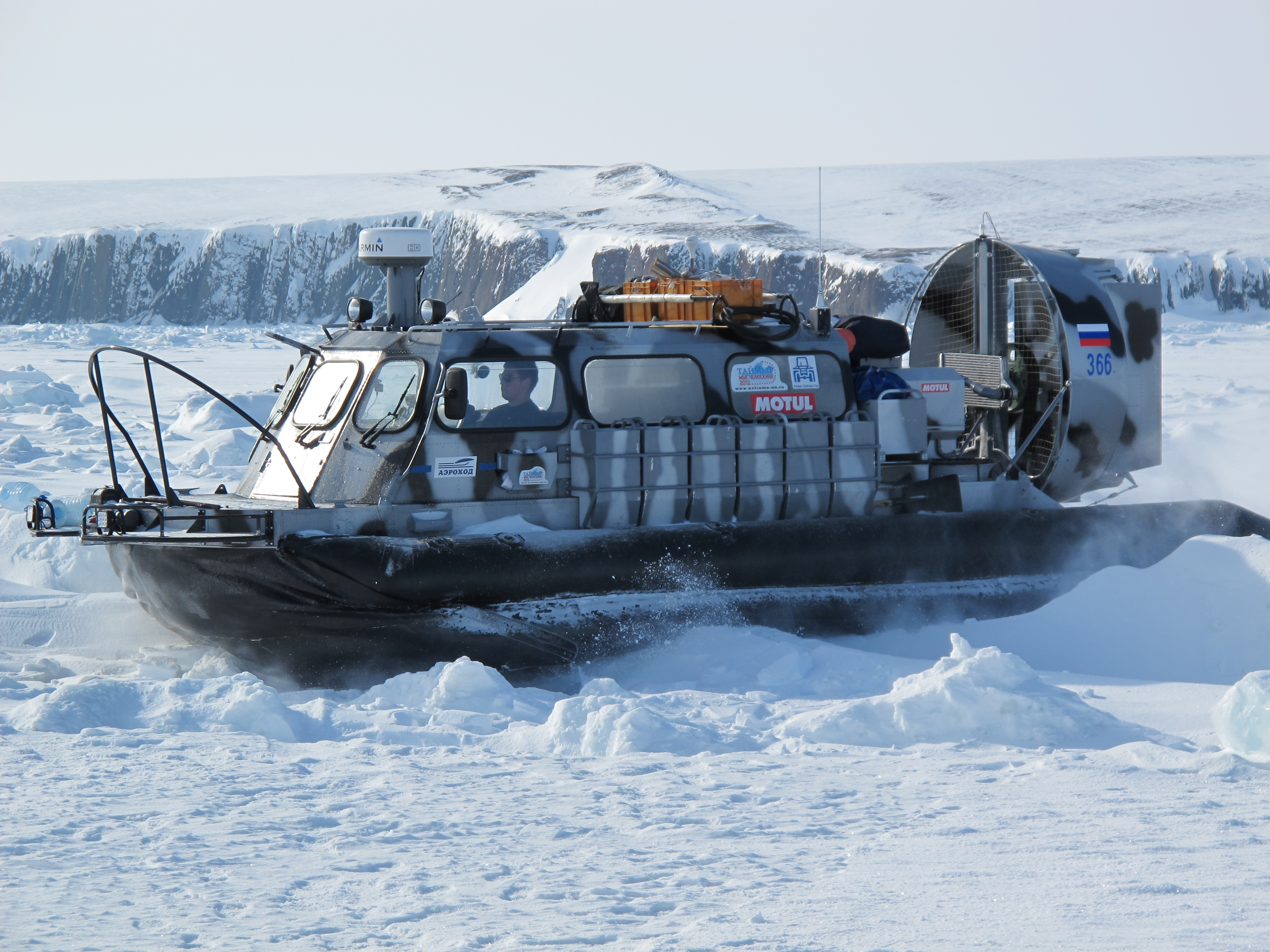
Hivus-10 hovercraft on Taimyr peninsula in April 2013

In 2006, Kvichak Marine Industries of Seattle, US built, under licence, a cargo/passenger version of the Hoverwork BHT130. Designated 'Suna-X', it is used as a high-speed ferry for up to 47 passengers and 47,500 pounds (21,500 kg) of freight serving the remote Alaskan villages of King Cove and Cold Bay.

An experimental service was operated in Scotland across the Firth of Forth (between Kirkcaldy and Portobello, Edinburgh), from 16 to 28 July 2007. Marketed as Forthfast, the service used a craft chartered from Hovertravel and achieved an 85% passenger load factor. As of 2009, the possibility of establishing a permanent service is still under consideration.

Since the Channel routes abandoned hovercraft, and pending any reintroduction on the Scottish route, the United Kingdom's only public hovercraft service is that operated by Hovertravel between Southsea (Portsmouth) and Ryde on the Isle of Wight.

From the 1960s, several commercial lines were operated in Japan, without much success. In Japan the last commercial line had linked Ōita Airport and central Ōita but was shut down in October 2009. However, the commercial line between Ōita Airport and central Ōita is scheduled to reopen in 2024.

Hovercraft are still manufactured in the UK, near to where they were first conceived and tested, on the Isle of Wight. They can also be chartered for a wide variety of uses including inspections of shallow bed offshore wind farms and VIP or passenger use. A typical vessel would be a Tiger IV or a Griffon. They are light, fast, road transportable and very adaptable with the unique feature of minimising damage to environments.

=== Military ===
==== China ====
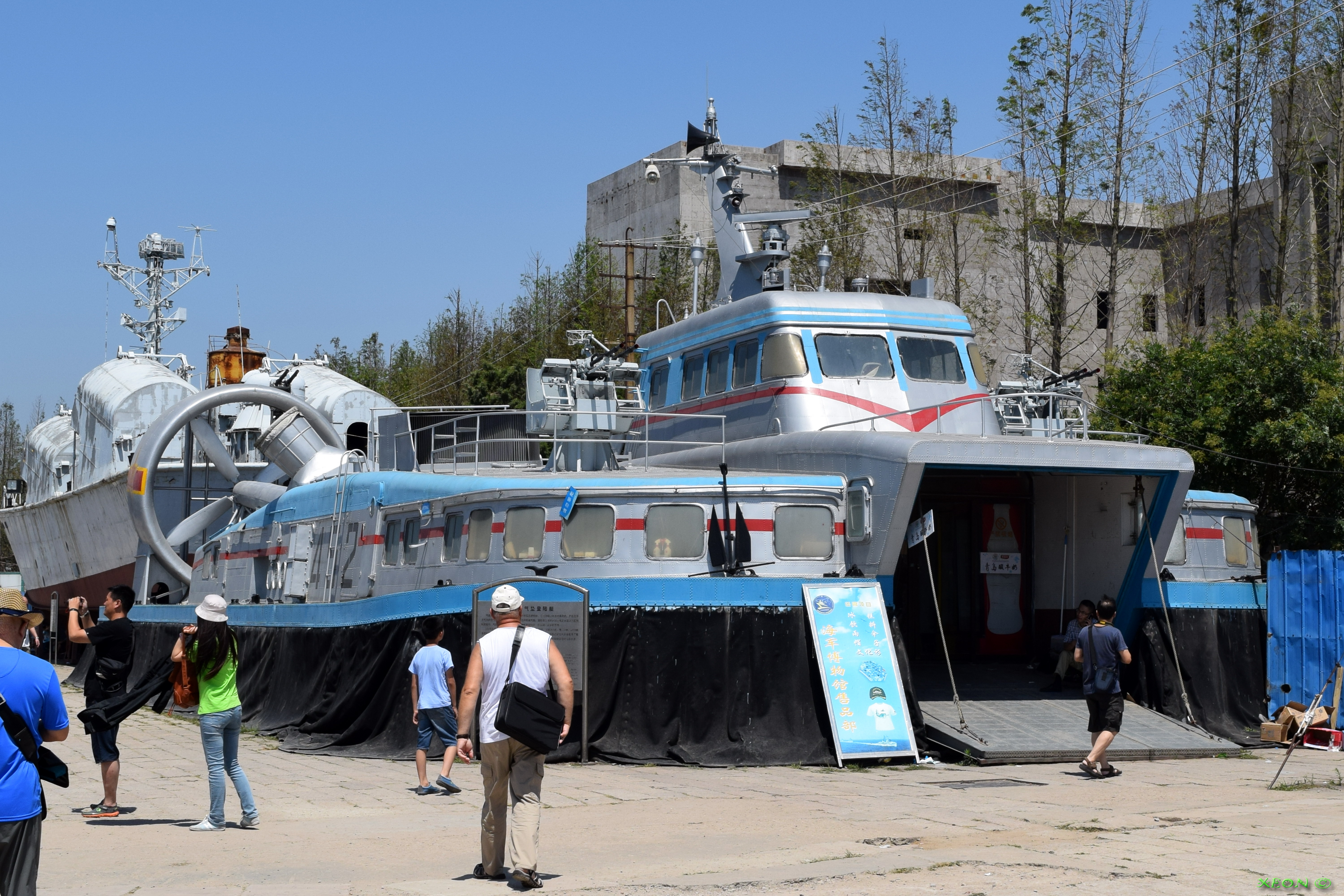
Prototype 452 of Type 722 II LCAC in Chinese Navy Museum, Qingdao

The People's Army Navy of China operates the Jingsah II class LCAC. This troop and equipment carrying hovercraft is roughly the Chinese equivalent of the US Navy LCAC.

==== Finland ====
The Finnish Navy designed an experimental missile attack hovercraft class, Tuuli class hovercraft, in the late 1990s. The prototype of the class, Tuuli, was commissioned in 2000. It proved an extremely successful design for a littoral fast attack craft, but due to fiscal reasons and doctrinal change in the Navy, the hovercraft was soon withdrawn.

==== Iran ====
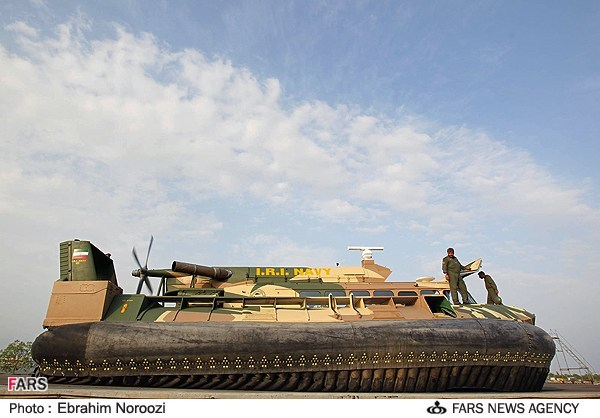
Tondar hovercraft

Prior to the Iranian Revolution in 1979, the country had one of the largest hovercraft fleets in the world. In 1999, it was estimated that five or six BH.7 and seven or eight SR.N6 were still in service. According to Anthony Cordesman, about half were operational. In 2012, the domestically built Tondar ("Thunderbolt") was unveiled.

The Iranian Navy and Islamic Revolutionary Guard Corps use hovercraft for reconnaissance and asymmetric warfare missions, and for landing troops on suitable beaches. While the Tondar can launch drones and cruise missiles, it's also fast enough to perform recon missions.

==== Russia ====
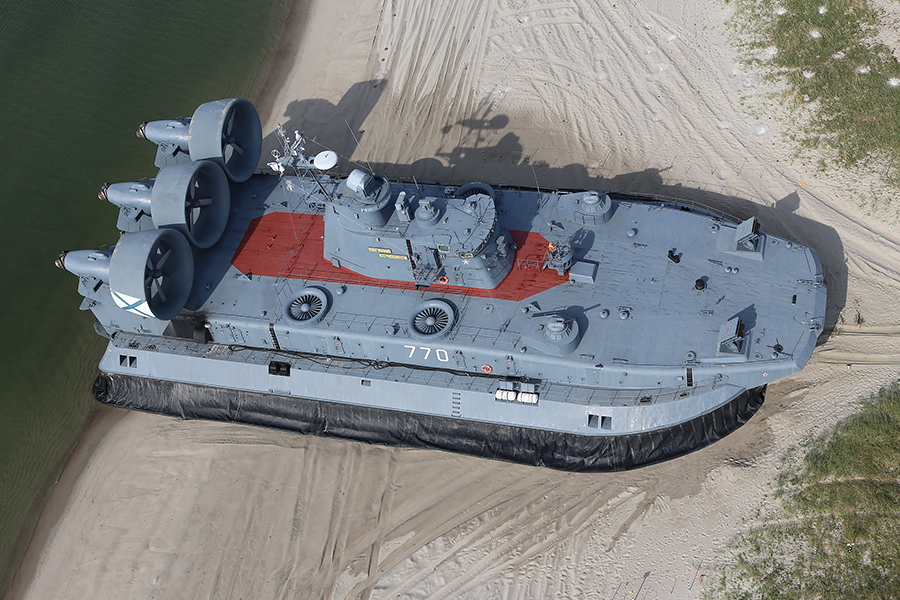
A Zubr-class landing craft, an example of a large armed military hovercraft. To support landing operations, this class is armed with Grad rockets and AK-306s

The Soviet Union had a variety of military hovercraft, from the small Czilim-class hovercraft, comparable to the SR.N6, the large Zubr-class landing craft which is the most massive class of hovercraft ever built, and the Bora missile launcher surface effect ship (surface effect ships; somewhat akin to hybrids between a hovercraft and a catamaran).

After the dissolution of the Soviet Union, the Zubr fleet was divided between the fleets of Ukraine (which received much of the Black Sea Fleet) and Russia (VMF). Due to Ukraine's inability to fund the maintenance of a fleet of heavy landing craft, most of the fleet was scrapped (akin to the sole Project 1238 hovercraft), though a number of the Zubr-class ships were exported, including ships commissioned from the Russian Federation. As of 2025, the Zubr class remains in service with the Russian Navy/VMF, the PLAN, and the Hellenic Navy.

The Murena-class is a ~150 tonnes (170 tons) landing hovercraft developed by the Soviet Union. By 2025, the ROKN is the only operator of the class, though the Russian Federation has declared plans to build a modernised version of the class in Khabarovsk.

==== United Kingdom ====
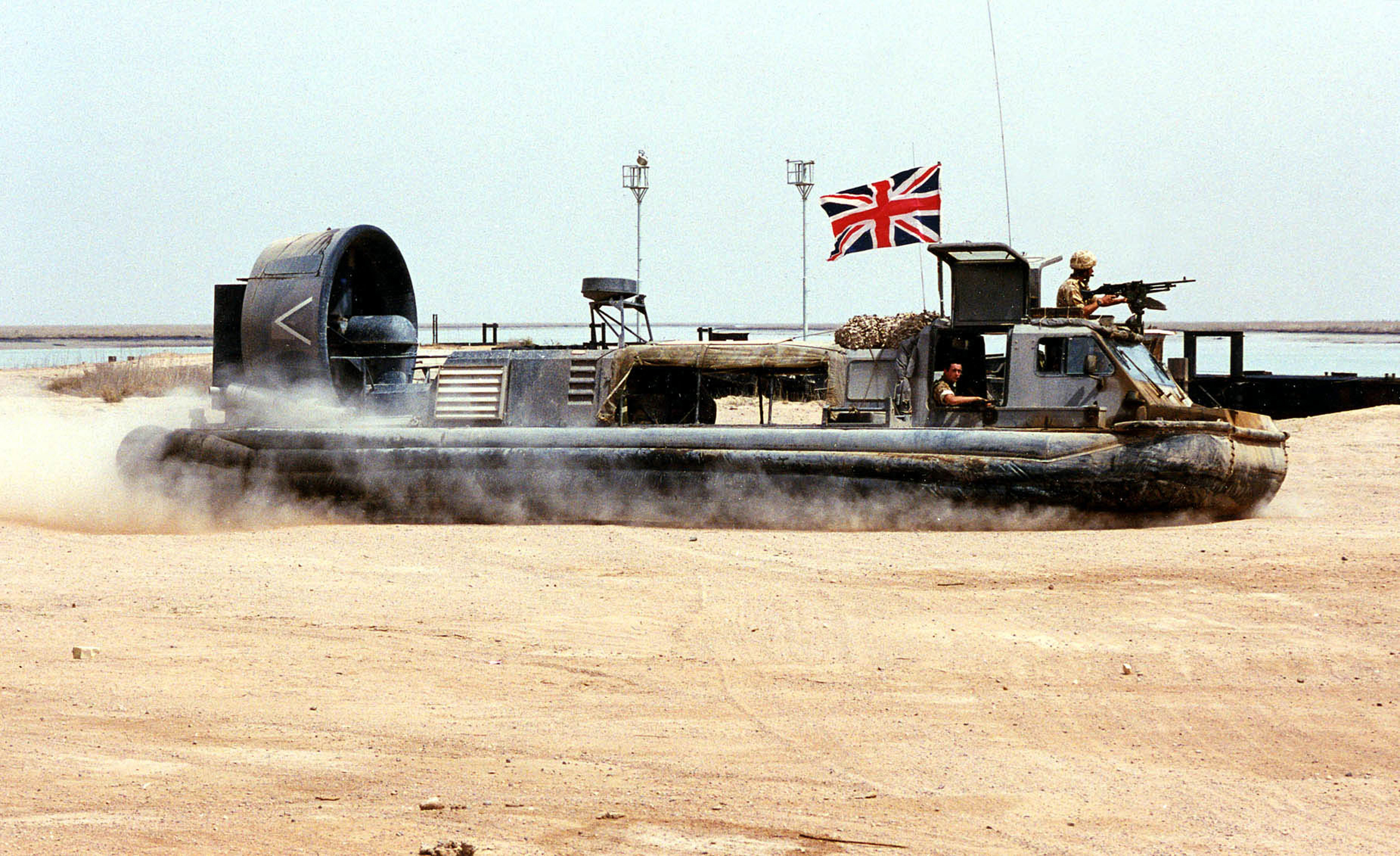
A Griffon 2000 TDX Class hovercraft of the Royal Marines on patrol in Iraq in April 2003

The first application of the hovercraft for military use was by the British Armed Forces, using hovercraft built by Saunders-Roe. In 1961, the United Kingdom set up the Interservice Hovercraft Trials Unit (IHTU) based at RNAS Lee-on-Solent (HMS Daedalus), now the site of the Hovercraft Museum, near Portsmouth. This unit carried out trials on the SR.N1 from Mk1 through Mk5 as well as testing the SR.N2, SR.N3, SR.N5 and SR.N6 craft. The Hovercraft Trials Unit (Far East) was established by the Royal Navy at Singapore in August 1964 with two armed hovercraft; they were deployed later that year to Tawau in Malaysian Borneo and operated on waterways there during the Indonesia–Malaysia confrontation. The hovercraft's inventor, Sir Christopher Cockerell, claimed late in his life that the Falklands War could have been won far more easily had the British military shown more commitment to the hovercraft; although earlier trials had been conducted in the Falkland Islands with an SRN-6, the hovercraft unit had been disbanded by the time of the conflict. Currently, the Royal Marines use the Griffonhoverwork 2400TD hovercraft, the replacement for the Griffon 2000 TDX Class ACV, which was deployed operationally by the marines in the 2003 invasion of Iraq.

==== United States ====
During the 1960s, Bell licensed and sold the Saunders-Roe SR.N5 as the Bell SK-5. They were deployed on trial to the Vietnam War by the United States Navy as PACV patrol craft in the Mekong Delta where their mobility and speed was unique. This was used in both the UK SR.N5 curved deck configuration and later with modified flat deck, gun turret and grenade launcher designated the 9255 PACV. The United States Army also experimented with the use of SR.N5 hovercraft in Vietnam. Three hovercraft with the flat deck configuration were deployed to Đồng Tâm in the Mekong Delta region and later to Ben Luc. They saw action primarily in the Plain of Reeds. One was destroyed in early 1970 and another in August of that same year, after which the unit was disbanded. The only remaining US Army SR.N5 hovercraft is currently on display in the Army Transport Museum in Virginia.

Experience led to the proposed Bell SK-10, which was the basis for the LCAC-class air-cushioned landing craft now deployed by the US and Japanese Navy. Developed and tested in the mid-1970s, the LACV-30 was used by the US Army to transport military cargo in logistics-over-the-shore operations from the early 1980s until the mid-1990s.

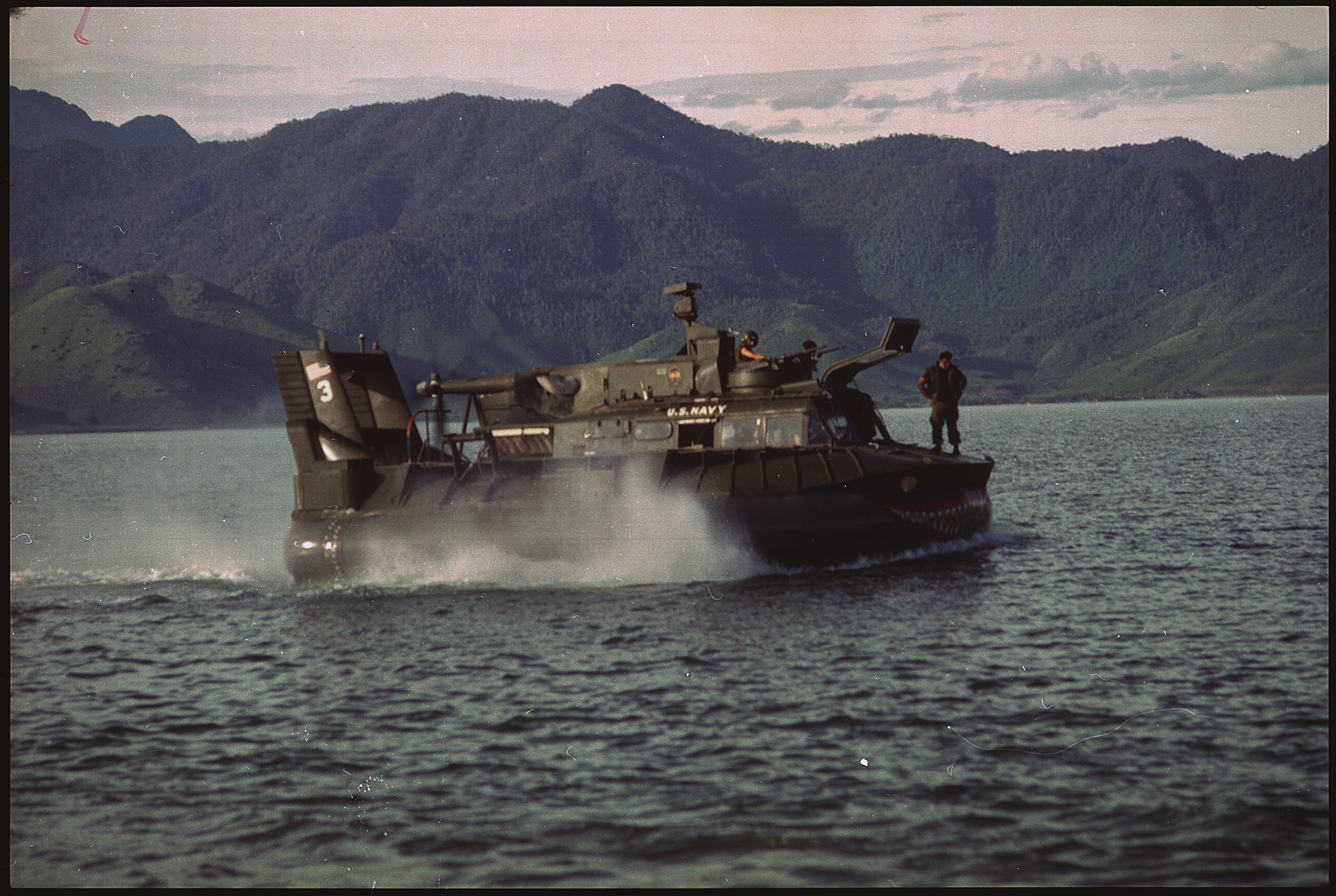
A US patrol air cushion vehicle (PACV) in Cau Hai Bay near Hue South Vietnam 1968

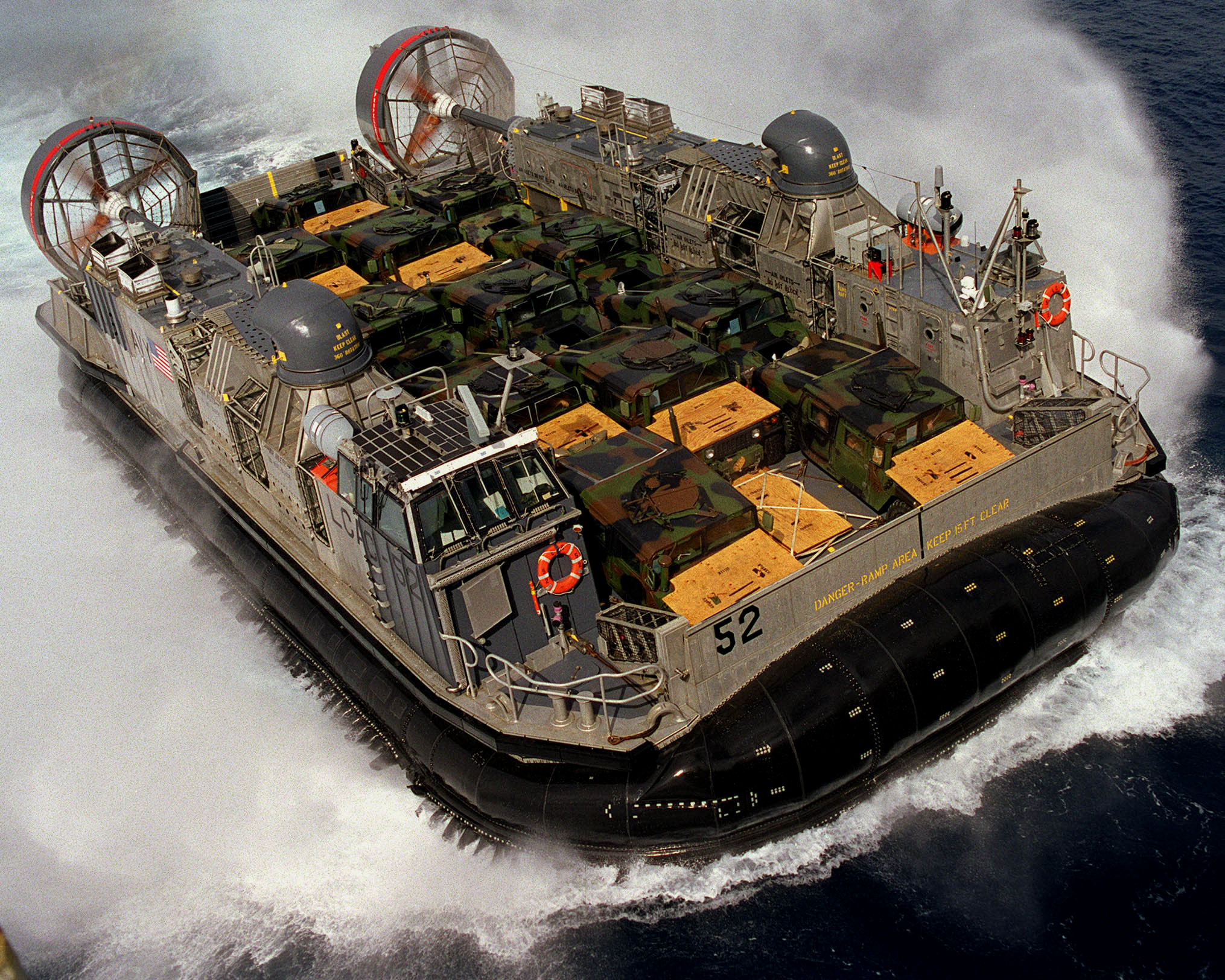
A US Navy Landing Craft Air Cushion, an example of a military hovercraft

=== Recreational/sport ===
Small commercially manufactured, kit or plan-built hovercraft are increasingly being used for recreational purposes, such as inland racing and cruising on inland lakes and rivers, marshy areas, estuaries and inshore coastal waters.

The Hovercraft Cruising Club supports the use of hovercraft for cruising in coastal and inland waterways, lakes and lochs.

The Hovercraft Club of Great Britain, founded in 1966, regularly organises inland and coastal hovercraft race events at various venues across the United Kingdom. Similar events are also held in Europe and the US.

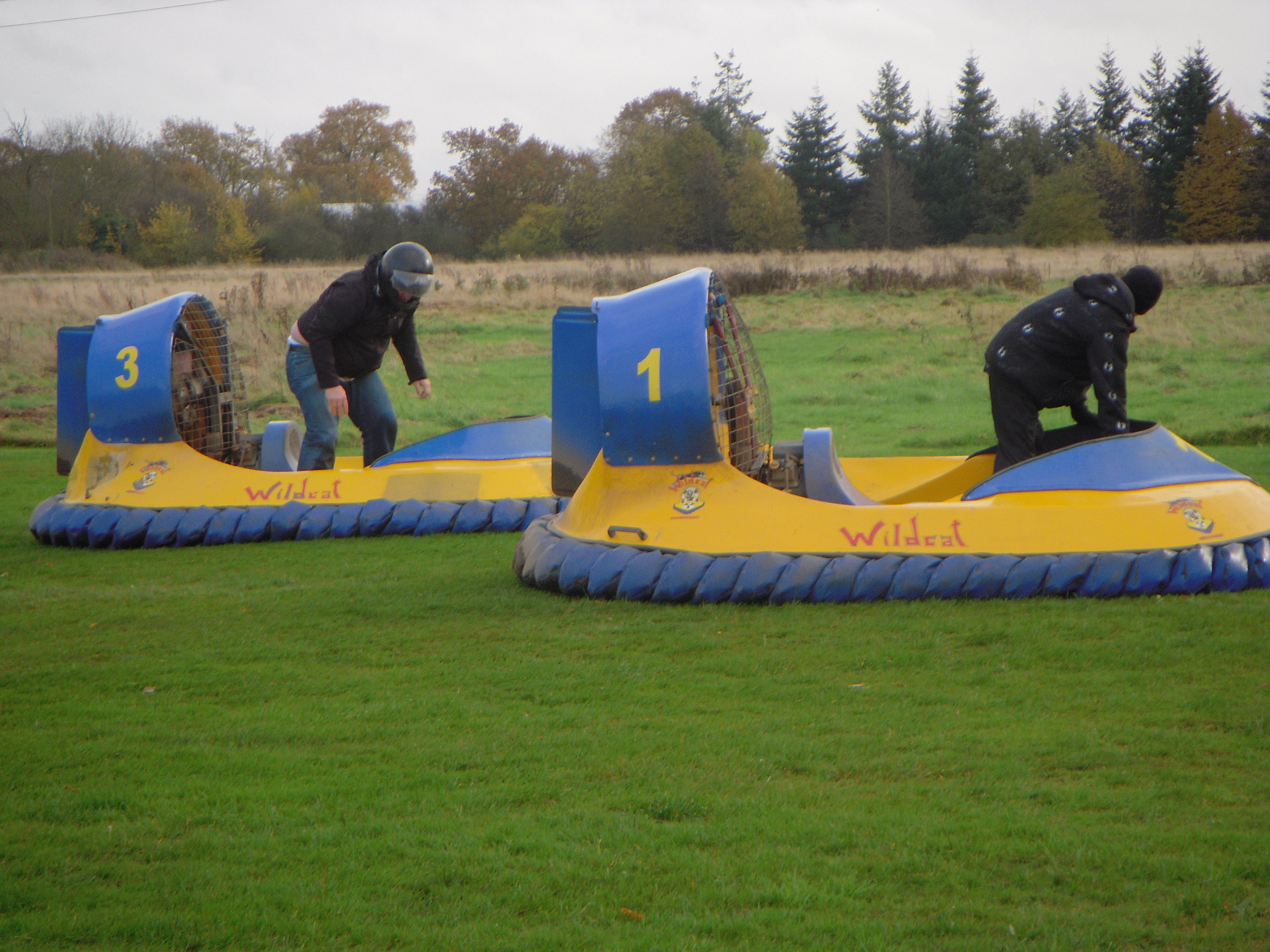
Single-seater racing hovercraft

In August 2010, the Hovercraft Club of Great Britain hosted the World Hovercraft Championships at Towcester Racecourse, followed by the 2016 World Hovercraft Championships at the West Midlands Water Ski Centre in Tamworth.

The World Hovercraft Championships are run under the auspices of the World Hovercraft Federation. So far the World Hovercraft Championships had been hosted by France: 1993 in Verneuil, 1997 in Lucon, 2006 at the Lac de Tolerme; Germany: 1987 in Bad Karlshafen, 2004 in Berlin, 2012 and 2018 in Saalburg; Portugal: 1995 in Peso de la Regua; Sweden: 2008 and 2022 at Flottbro Ski Centre in Huddinge; UK 1991 and 2000 at Weston Parc; US: 1989 in Troy (Ohio), 2002 in Terre Haute. The 2020 World Hovercraft Championships had to be postponed to 2022 due to restriction caused by the COVID-19 outbreak.

Apart from the craft designed as "racing hovercraft", which are often only suitable for racing, there is another form of small personal hovercraft for leisure use, often referred to as cruising hovercraft, capable of carrying up to four people. Just like their full size counterparts, the ability of these small personal hovercraft to safely cross all types of terrain, (e.g. water, sandbanks, swamps, ice, etc.) and reach places often inaccessible by any other type of craft, makes them suitable for a number of roles, such as survey work and patrol and rescue duties in addition to personal leisure use. Increasingly, these craft are being used as yacht tenders, enabling yacht owners and guests to travel from a waiting yacht to, for example, a secluded beach. In this role, small hovercraft can offer a more entertaining alternative to the usual small boat and can be a rival for the jet-ski. The excitement of a personal hovercraft can now be enjoyed at "experience days", which are popular with families, friends and those in business, who often see them as team building exercises. This level of interest has naturally led to a hovercraft rental sector and numerous manufacturers of small, ready built designs of personal hovercraft to serve the need.

=== Other uses ===
Boren ride-on Power Trowel

==== Hoverbarge ====
A real benefit of air cushion vehicles in moving heavy loads over difficult terrain, such as swamps, was overlooked by the excitement of the British Government funding to develop high-speed hovercraft. It was not until the early 1970s that the technology was used for moving a modular marine barge with a dragline on board for use over soft reclaimed land.

Mackace (Mackley Air Cushion Equipment), now known as Hovertrans, produced a number of successful Hoverbarges, such as the 250 ton payload "Sea Pearl", which operated in Abu Dhabi, and the twin 160 ton payload "Yukon Princesses", which ferried trucks across the Yukon River to aid the pipeline build. Hoverbarges are still in operation today. In 2006, Hovertrans (formed by the original managers of Mackace) launched a 330-ton payload drilling barge in the swamps of Suriname.

The Hoverbarge technology is somewhat different from high-speed hovercraft, which has traditionally been constructed using aircraft technology. The initial concept of the air cushion barge has always been to provide a low-tech amphibious solution for accessing construction sites using typical equipment found in this area, such as diesel engines, ventilating fans, winches and marine equipment. The load to move a 200 ton payload ACV barge at 5 kn (9.3 km/h) would only be 5 tons. The skirt and air distribution design on high-speed craft again is more complex, as they have to cope with the air cushion being washed out by a wave and wave impact. The slow speed and large mono chamber of the hover barge actually helps reduce the effect of wave action, giving a very smooth ride.

The low pull force enabled a Boeing 107 helicopter to pull a hoverbarge across snow, ice and water in 1982.

==== Hovertrains ====
Several attempts have been made to adopt air cushion technology for use in fixed track systems, in order to use the lower frictional forces for delivering high speeds. The most advanced example of this was the Aérotrain, an experimental high speed hovertrain built and operated in France between 1965 and 1977. The project was abandoned in 1977 due to lack of funding, the death of its lead engineer and the adoption of the TGV by the French government as its high-speed ground transport solution.

A test track for a tracked hovercraft system was built at Earith near Cambridge, England. It ran southwest from Sutton Gault, sandwiched between the Old Bedford River and the smaller Counter Drain to the west. Careful examination of the site will still reveal traces of the concrete piers used to support the structure. The actual vehicle, RTV31, is preserved at Railworld in Peterborough and can be seen from trains, just south west of Peterborough railway station. The vehicle achieved 104 mph (167 km/h) on 7 February 1973 but the project was cancelled a week later. The project was managed by Tracked Hovercraft Ltd., with Denys Bliss as Director in the early 1970s, then axed by the Aerospace Minister, Michael Heseltine. Records of this project are available from the correspondence and papers of Sir Harry Legge-Bourke, MP at Leeds University Library. Heseltine was accused by Airey Neave and others of misleading the House of Commons when he stated that the government was still considering giving financial support to the Hovertrain, when the decision to pull the plug had already been taken by the Cabinet.

After the Cambridge project was abandoned due to financial constraints, parts of the project were picked up by the engineering firm Alfred McAlpine, and abandoned in the mid-1980s. The Tracked Hovercraft project and Professor Laithwaite's Maglev train system were contemporaneous, and there was intense competition between the two prospective British systems for funding and credibility.

At the other end of the speed spectrum, the U-Bahn Serfaus has been in continuous operation since 1985. This is an unusual underground air cushion funicular rapid transit system, situated in the Austrian ski resort of Serfaus. Only 1,280 m (4,200 ft) long, the line reaches a maximum speed of 25 mph (40 km/h). A similar system also exists in Narita International Airport near Tokyo, Japan.

In the late 1960s and early 1970s, the US Department of Transport's Urban Mass Transit Administration (UMTA) funded several hovertrain projects, which were known as Tracked Air Cushion Vehicles or TACVs. They were also known as Aerotrains since one of the builders had a licence from Bertin's Aerotrain company. Three separate projects were funded. Research and development was carried out by Rohr, Inc., Garrett AiResearch and Grumman. UMTA built an extensive test site in Pueblo, Colorado, with different types of tracks for the different technologies used by the prototype contractors. They managed to build prototypes and do a few test runs before the funding was cut.

==== Heavy haulage ====
From the 1960s to 1980s, heavy haulers in the UK used an air-cushion system for their hydraulic modular trailers to carry overweight loads over bridges which were not able to bear the weight of the load and the trailer. The Central Electricity Generating Board had to move transformers from one place to another which weighed from 150 tons to 300 tons for which they did not have appropriate equipment; so they hired heavy haulers like Wynns and Pickfords who had specialised equipment like hydraulic modular trailers manufactured by Nicolas and Cometto, and ballast tractors from Scammell which were strong and powerful enough to carry the load. This made the transportation efficient by avoiding bridge reinforcement, in some cases costing €30,000.

The transformers were loaded into the girder frame of the hydraulic modular trailer with axle lines in front and behind of the transformer, which made it possible to keep the transformer as low as possible to the ground to negotiate obstacles on the route. Air cushions were mounted under the girder frame's surface and were operated by a compressor vehicle which was a customised Commer 16-ton maxiload provided by CEGB. The vehicle was loaded with 4 air compressors powered by a Rolls-Royce engine producing 235 bhp. While negotiating a bridge the air cushions were inflated and that reduced the stress tremendously on the bridge. Without this technology the government would have had to rebuild the bridges which was not feasible just to carry a small number of loads.

==== Non-transportation ====
The Hoover Constellation was a spherical canister-type vacuum cleaner notable for its lack of wheels. Floating on a cushion of air, it was a domestic hovercraft. They were not especially good as vacuum cleaners as the air escaping from under the cushion blew uncollected dust in all directions, nor as hovercraft as their lack of a skirt meant that they only hovered effectively over a smooth surface. Despite this, original Constellations are sought-after collectibles today.

The Flymo is an air-cushion lawn mower that uses a fan on the cutter blade to provide lift. This allows it to be moved in any direction, and provides double-duty as a mulcher.

The Marylebone Cricket Club owns a "hover cover" that it uses regularly to cover the pitch at Lord's Cricket Ground. This device is easy and quick to move, and has no pressure points, making damage to the pitch less likely.

A power trowel is a hovercraft device used for skimming concrete.

== Features ==
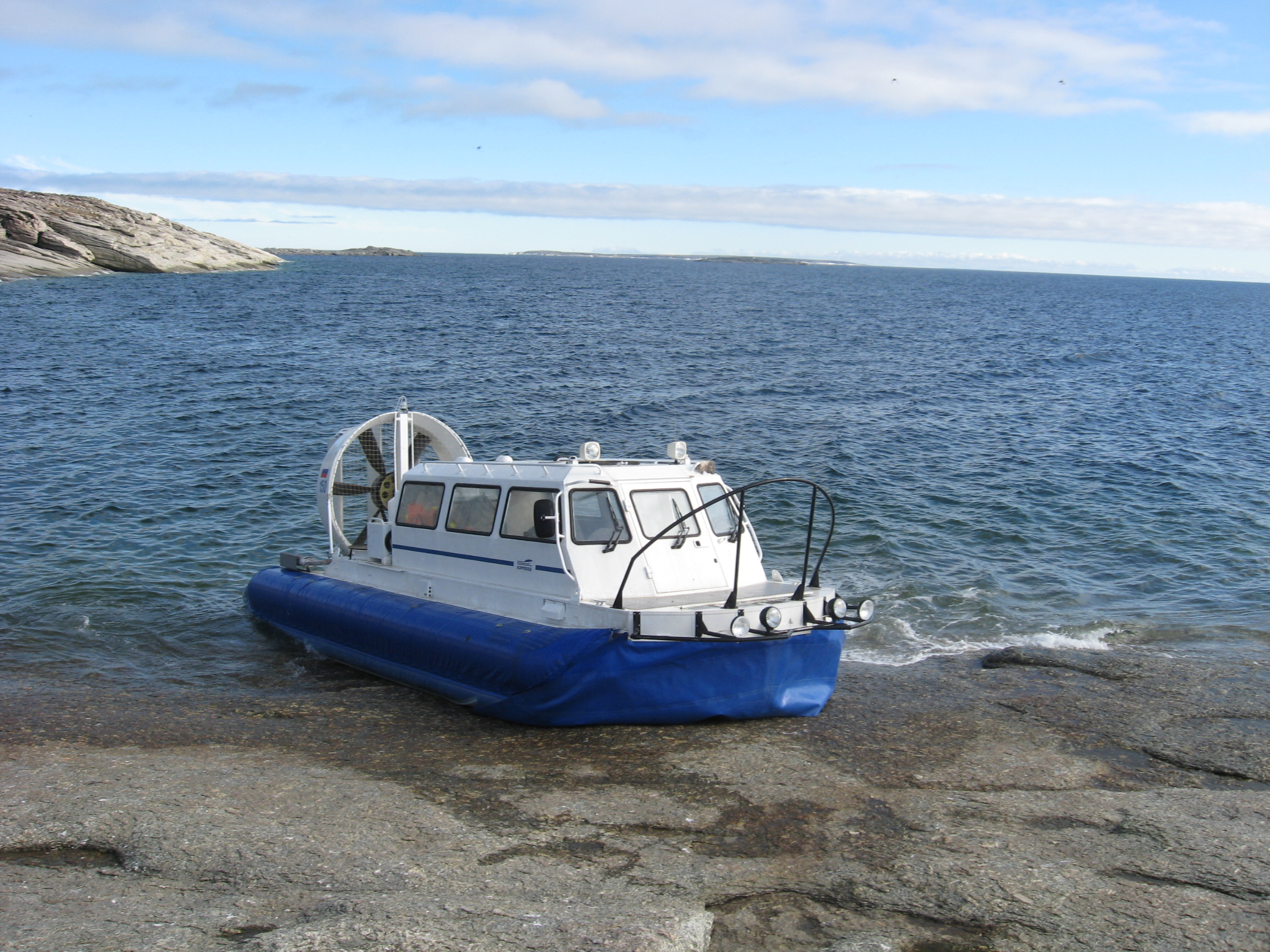
Russian Hivus-6 on Kara Sea beach in northern Russia

=== Advantages ===
- Terrain-independence - crossing beachfronts and slopes up to 40 degrees
- All-season capability - frozen or flowing rivers no object
- Speed
- Flexibility, due to low surface friction

=== Disadvantages ===
- Engine noise emissions
- Initial costs
- Proneness to contrary winds
- Skirt wear and tear

== Preservation ==
The Hovercraft Museum at Lee-on-the-Solent, Hampshire, England, houses the world's largest collection of hovercraft designs, including some of the earliest and largest. Much of the collection is housed within the retired SR.N4 hovercraft Princess Anne. She is the last of her kind in the world. There are many hovercraft in the museum but all are non-operational.

As of 2023, Hovercraft continue in use between Ryde on the Isle of Wight and Southsea on the English mainland. The service, operated by Hovertravel, schedules up to three crossings each hour, and provides the fastest way of getting on or off the island. Large passenger-hovercraft are still manufactured on the Isle of Wight.

== Records ==
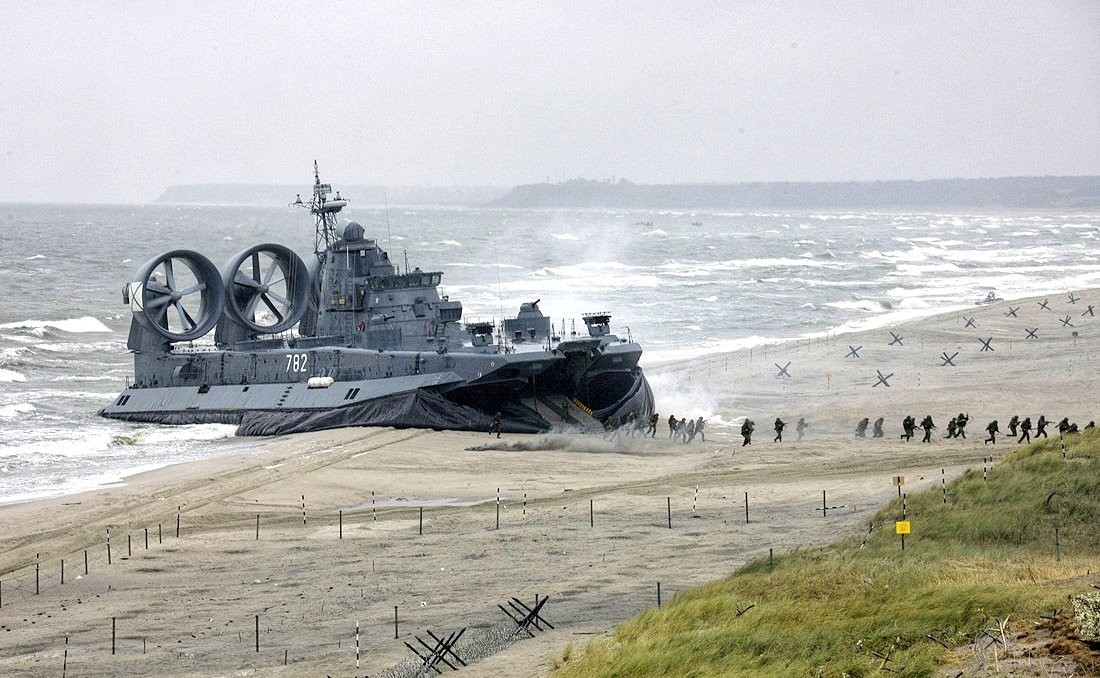
World's largest military hovercraft – The Russian Zubr class LCAC

- World's largest civil hovercraft – The BHC SR.N4 Mk.III, at 56.4 m (185 ft) length and 310 metric tons (305 long tons) weight, can accommodate 418 passengers and 60 cars.
- World's largest military hovercraft – The Russian Zubr class LCAC at 57.6 metres (188 feet) length and a maximum displacement of 535 tons. This hovercraft can transport three T-80 main battle tanks (MBT), 140 fully equipped troops, or up to 130 tons of cargo. Four have been purchased by the Greek Navy.
- English Channel crossing – 22 minutes by Princess Anne Mountbatten class hovercraft SR.N4 Mk.III on 14 September 1995
- World hovercraft speed record – 137.4 km/h (85.38 mph or 74.19 knots). Bob Windt (USA) at World Hovercraft Championships, Rio Douro River, Peso de Regua, Portugal on 18 September 1995.
- Hovercraft land speed record – 56.25 mph (90.53 km/h or 48.88 knots). John Alford (USA) at Bonneville Salt Flats, Utah, USA on 21 September 1988.
- Longest continuous use – The original prototype SR.N6 Mk.I (009) was in service for over 20 years, and logged 22,000 hours of use. It is currently on display at the Hovercraft Museum in Lee-on-the-Solent, Hampshire, England.

== See also ==
- Aerofex hover vehicle
- Airboat
- LCAC
- Avrocar
- Coandă effect
- Ekranoplan
- Fluid bearing
- Flymo
- Hoverboard
- Hovercar
- Hovercraft tank
- Hydrofoil
- Pegasus
- Research Test Vehicle 31
- Resonance method of ice destruction
- Saab 401 Swedish air-cushion vehicle prototype
- Ship-to-Shore Connector
- Surface effect ship
