= Vickers-Armstrongs VA-3 =

British hovercraft, 1962

The Vickers-Armstrongs VA-3 was the hovercraft used for the world's first passenger-carrying hovercraft service. The VA-3 entered service with British United Airways, and was used for an experimental ferry service across the Dee Estuary between Rhyl on the North Wales coast and Wallasey, on the Wirral Peninsular on the coast of North West England. On this route, the craft carried up to 24 passengers the 15-nautical-mile (17-mile; 28-kilometre) journey at up to 60 knots (69 mph; 110 km/h) and in about 25 minutes. The experimental service operated 12 times daily, for £1 per journey, from 20 July until 14 September 1962.

== Background ==
The VA-3 was the third in a line of experimental hovercraft created, built, and developed by the British engineering company Vickers Armstrongs in partnership with Hovercraft Development Ltd. The VA-1 appeared in 1960, and was followed in 1961 by the VA-2. Whilst the VA-2 was being tested, work began on the VA-3.

== Description ==
The build of the VA-3 began in March 1961 and trials began in April 1962.

The VA-3 was 55 feet 7 inches (16.94 metres) long, 27 feet (8.2 m) wide, and weighed 12 long tons (12 tonnes). The craft was powered by four 425-shaft-horsepower (317 kW) Bristol Siddeley Turmo free-turbine engines. Two of the engines provided propulsion, each driving a 10-foot (3.0 m) 4-bladed variable-pitch propeller and two provided lift, each driving an 11-foot (3.4 m) fan.

On its last journey, the craft had a mid-journey break-down and was taken to Rhyl promenade. Whilst moored, it was damaged in a storm on the night of 16 September 1962. After the craft was repaired it was taken to North America where it was used for military testing. A few years later it was returned to the UK where it was deliberately sunk somewhere off the south coast of England in the late 1960s.

The only known surviving part of the craft is its lift fan which is now part of the collection of the Hovercraft Museum in Hampshire, England.

== Experimental passenger service ==
A service between Rhyl and Wallasey was conceived to test the feasibility of using a hovercraft to carry passengers on the open sea and to understand the costs. British United Airways launched the service, branded as the Hovercoach and which was the world's first passenger service using a hovercraft, on 20 July 1962. By 29 June 1962, more than 2,000 bookings for seats were made to travel on the service, with fares set as £1 for a single trip and £2 for a return ticket. The service crossed the Dee Estuary from Rhyl on the north coast of Wales to Wallasey in northwest England, with six trips each way per day and each trip taking about 25 minutes. The trial was ended on 14 September 1962 when the craft broke-down during a journey. The experiment was deemed a success after almost 4,000 people completed the crossing during the summer of 1962 and the craft completed 4,000 miles (6,400 km).

== Trials in the United States ==
Under the terms of a collaboration partnership, in 1964 the VA-3 was shipped to the United States for further trials there by Republic Aviation Corporation. In 1965 it was returned to the UK.
