= Flymo =

Hover lawnmower brand

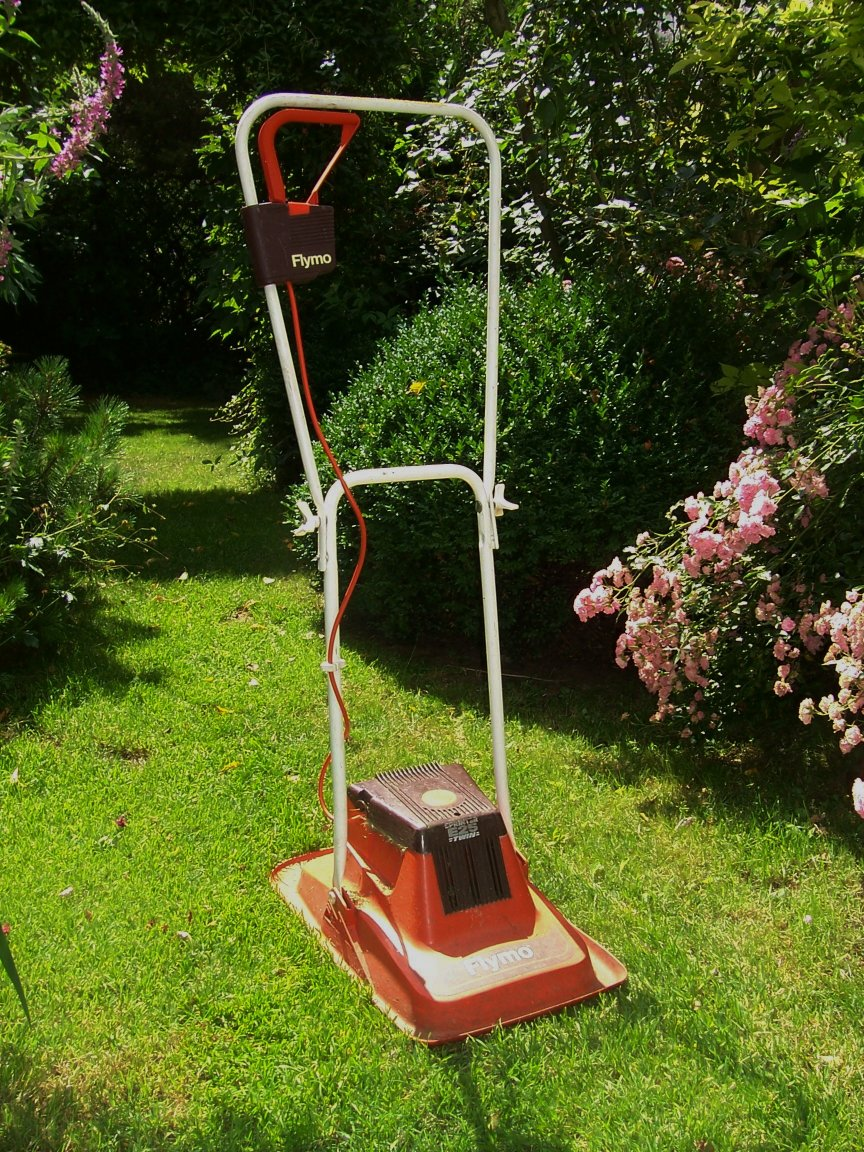
Flymo E25 hover mower

Flymo is a hover lawnmower invented by Karl Dahlman in 1964, after seeing Sir Christopher Cockerell's hovercraft. "Flymo" is a brand name of the Swedish company Husqvarna AB, a part of Electrolux from 1978 to 2006. The mower is a variation of the petrol-powered rotary push lawn mower, but uses a fan above the mower's spinning blades to allow the mower's body to hover over the lawn. The mower is claimed to be more manoeuvrable and easier to push than wheeled petrol mowers, while delivering similar results.

== Operation ==
The Flymo has rotary cutting blades to which is attached a fan which blows air downwards, making the mower float on a cushion of air like a hovercraft. The mower's housing, which has a skirt like a hovercraft, is made of lightweight plastic. It contains the blades, fan, and an electric motor, either battery-operated or connected to the electricity mains via a cable trailing from the handle bar. The mower operates as long as the user keeps a switch pressed.

== UK manufacturing plant ==
In the 1970s, Flymo's production operations grew to produce all of their lawnmowers in their UK production plant at Aycliffe Business Park, Newton Aycliffe, County Durham, where they still make them today. The characteristic orange colour was introduced in 1977. Research and development was carried out in Durham until 2012, then moved to Germany and Sweden.

== Additional products ==
1980s

The company introduced a new kind of non-hovering electric type lawnmower, the Chevron. This electrically powered, wheeled lawnmower was aimed at gardeners who wanted clean mowing lines, which the Flymo does not produce.

In the United States, the Flymo was introduced to considerable advertising fanfare in the early 1980s. Although the unit achieved a great deal of attention and curiosity, not many sold in America.

1990s

In the 1990s, Flymo's focus as a company changed from just making lawnmowers, to also making garden tools including blowers and strimmers. The Gardenvac leaf blower and vacuum cleaner was introduced.

2013

Flymo announced their Robotic lawnmower line, the EasiLife 200/350/500, the model numbers being the number of square metres of lawn they could mow.

== List of Flymo products ==
Flymo has sold various lawn tractors and push mowers, in addition to other lawn and garden equipment. Other products include:

- Petrol lawnmowers (hovering and wheeled)
- Wheeled electric lawnmowers
- Hand mowers
- Hedge trimmers
- Edgers
- Garden vacuum cleaners
- Robotic lawnmowers
