= Czilim-class hovercraft =

Small patrol hovercraft used by the Border Guard Service of Russia

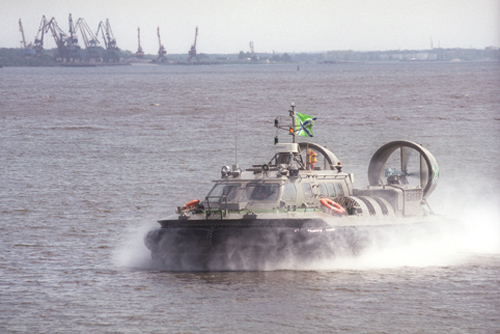

Class overview
- Builders: Yaroslavl Shipyard
- Operators: Russian Coast Guard
- Built: 1998–2000
- In commission: 2000–2010
- Completed: 1
- Retired: 1

General characteristics
- Type: Hovercraft
- Displacement: 9.5 t (9.3 long tons) full load
- Length: 12 m (39 ft 4 in)
- Beam: 5.9 m (19 ft 4 in)
- Propulsion: 2 × 235 kW (315 hp) Deutz BF 8L 513 diesel engines; 2 three-bladed variable-pitch propellers
- Speed: 43 kn (80 km/h; 49 mph)
- Range: 162 nmi (300 km; 186 mi) at 38 kn (70 km/h; 44 mph); 350 nmi (650 km; 400 mi) ferry range
- Endurance: 1 day
- Capacity: 6 border guards with equipment
- Crew: 2
- Sensors & processing systems: I-band navigational radar
- Armament: 1 × 7.62 mm PKMB machine gun

The Czilim-class ACV (Project 20910) is a small patrol hovercraft operated by the Border Service of the FSB of Russia.

== Configuration ==
The Czilim class is the first new class of military hovercraft developed for the Russian military since the fall of the Soviet Union. It is based on an Almaz CMDB design and was ordered from Yaroslavl Shipyard in the late 1990s. It is roughly the same size as the British SR.N6 hovercraft.

The Czilim class was designed for border patrol duties on the Amur River on the border with China, and is expected to be used entirely by Russian border guards. It is intended as a smaller replacement for the Soviet Gus-class LCAC. The first craft was laid down on 24 February 1998 and entered service on 18 September 2000. Three further craft were ordered at Yaroslavl in the late 1990s and early 2000s, though none are currently believed to be completed.

The Czilim class is capable of carrying six border guards and their equipment.

== See also ==
- List of ships of the Soviet Navy
- List of ships of Russia by project number
