= Pegasus (hovercraft) =

The Pegasus is a hydrofoil vehicle made for educational purposes. The plans could be purchased from an article in the January 1984 issue of Popular Mechanics.

In the construction process, larger lawn mower engines could be added to lift a heavier payload.
