= List of ships of the People's Liberation Army Navy =

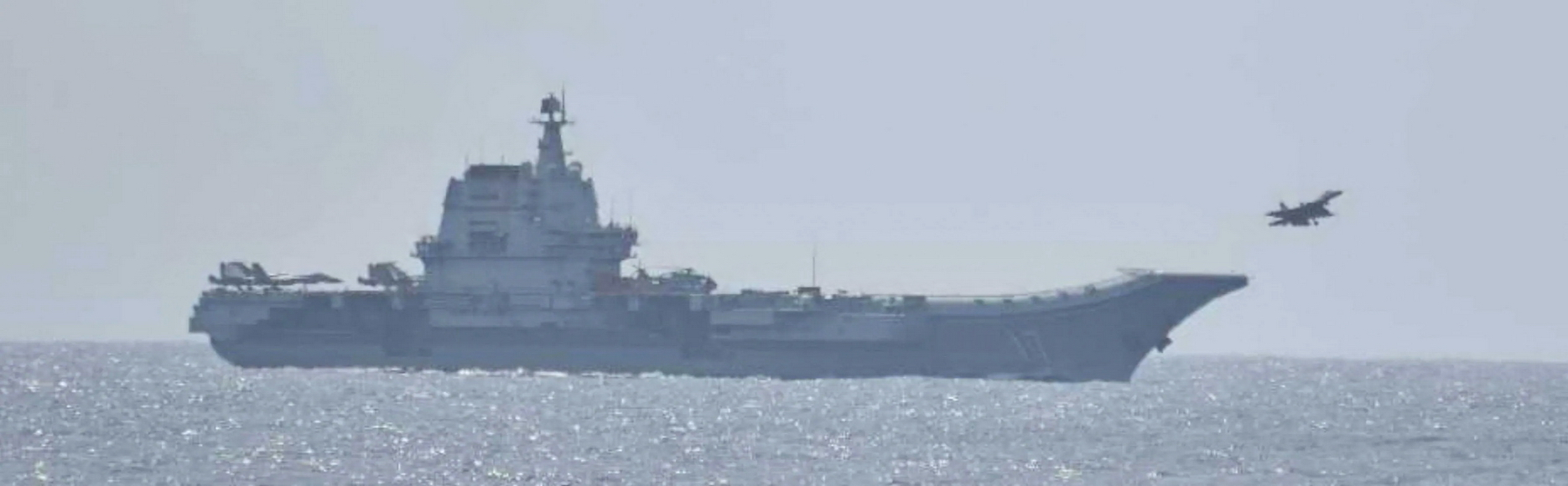
A Shenyang J-15 carrier-based fighter aircraft is taking off from Chinese aircraft carrier Shandong

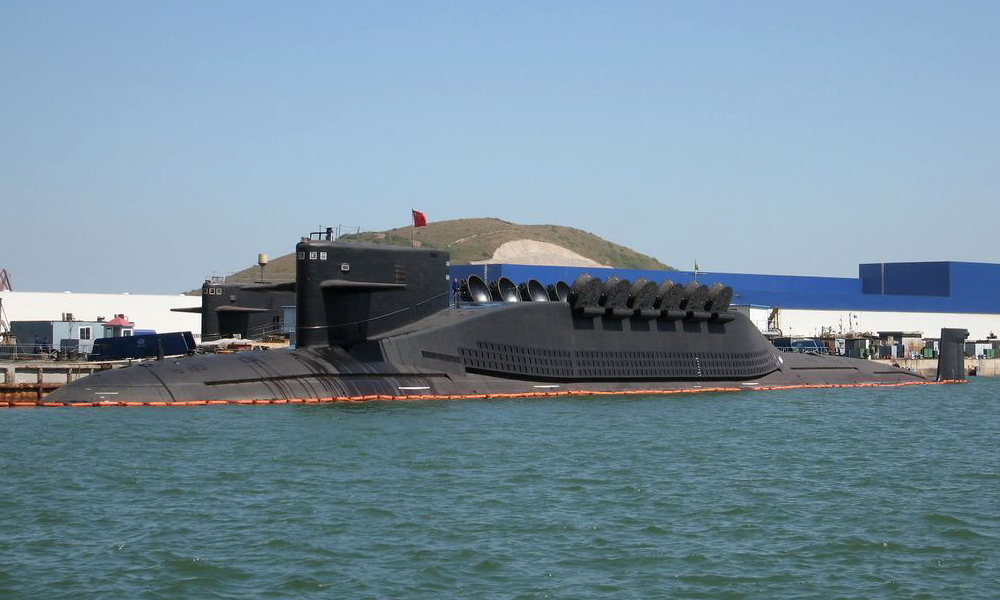
The Type 094 nuclear-powered strategic ballistic missile submarines, armed with intercontinental-range submarine-launched ballistic missiles (SLBM)s, are part of China's nuclear triad

The ship types in service with the People's Liberation Army Navy (PLAN) include aircraft carriers, submarines, (both nuclear and conventional), amphibious transport docks, tank landing ships, landing ships, medium, destroyers, frigates, corvettes, missile boats, submarine chasers, gunboats, mine countermeasures vessels, replenishment oilers and the various auxiliaries.

All ships and submarines currently in commission with the Navy were built in China, with the exception of Sovremenny-class destroyers, Kilo-class submarines, and the aircraft carrier Liaoning, as these vessels originated from the former Soviet Union.

== Active ships ==
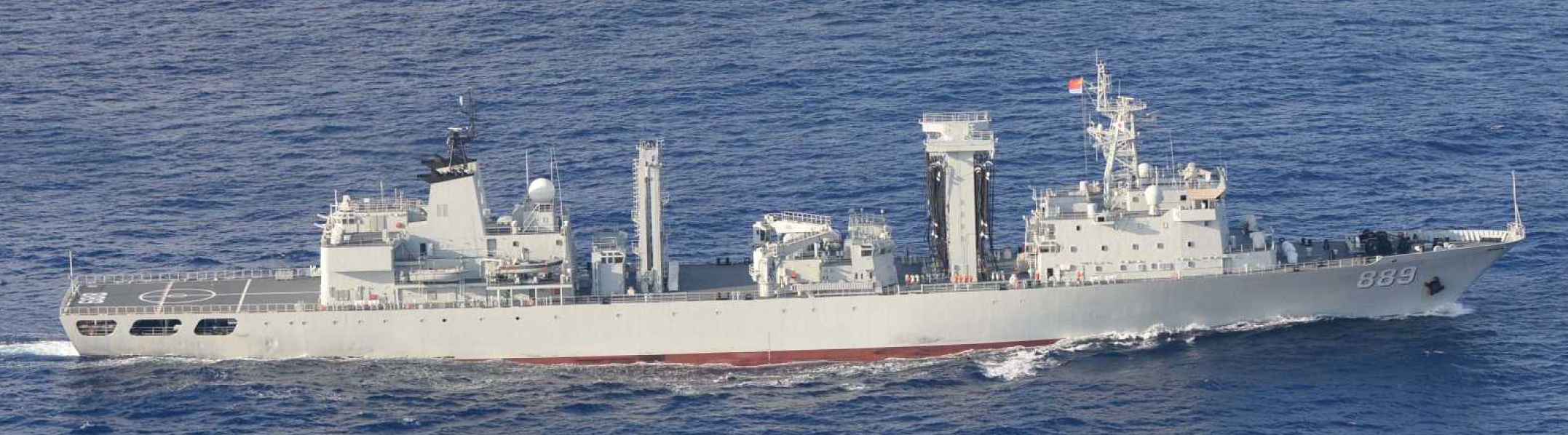
The Type 903A replenishment ship, a 23,369-ton ship class, is an example of the PLAN auxiliary ship fleet

The People's Liberation Army Navy (PLAN) operates the largest naval fleet in the world by the number of commissioned vessels. The PLAN is rapidly building and commissioning new naval ships. PLAN operates more than 400 vessels without auxiliary ships. Various auxiliary ships together number approximately 230. The fleet is supported by the People's Liberation Army Navy Air Force and People's Liberation Army Navy Coastal Defense Force. As of 2026, the PLAN's major combat forces include three aircraft carriers, four amphibious assault ships, and eight amphibious transport docks. The PLAN fleet also includes over 70 nuclear and conventionally powered submarines (including reserve). The major surface combatants fleet is heavily modernized and centered around more than 60 multirole destroyers, notably the advanced Type 055 and Type 052D classes, as well as more than 50 modern frigates and 50 corvettes. China also modernized Type 051B, Type 052B and Sovremenny-class (Project 956EM and Project 956E) destroyers with vertical launching systems (VLS). The major surface combatants are also supported by a large number of missile boats and mine countermeasures vessels. The navy also operates a large number of landing ships and crafts. In addition to its frontline combatants, the PLAN maintains a massive support and projection capability comprising a large number of auxiliary vessels. The ships of the navy are strategically distributed among the North Sea, East Sea, and South Sea fleets. The China Coast Guard and Maritime Militia also operate hundreds of naval ships.

The tables below list the various ships according to their class and date of commission. The newest class of ship is listed first, with proceeding classes listed afterwards, arranged in order of age and capability.

== Submarines ==
The PLAN currently operates at least 67 submarines. However, because the Chinese government does not publish official submarine fleet data, the actual number may be higher. China currently leads the world in submarine construction.

=== Strategic ballistic missile submarines (SSBN) ===
Image	Class	NATO designation	Number in service	List of ships	Notes
Active (7)
	Type 094 submarine	Jin	6		Nuclear-powered
	Type 032 submarine	Qing	1		Conventionally powered and used for missile testing
Future (≥1)
	Type 096	Tang			At least one submarine under construction

=== Nuclear-powered attack submarines (SSNs) ===
Image	Class	NATO designation	Number in service	List of ships	Notes
Active (12-14)
	Type 093B	Shang	6-8		VLS-equipped variant
	Type 093A	Shang	4		
	Type 093	Shang	2		
In reserve (3)
	Type 091	Han	3		In reserve
Future (≥1)
	Type 095	Sui			At least one submarine fitting out

=== Conventionally powered attack submarines (SSKs) ===
Image	Class	NATO designation	Number in service	List of ships	Notes
Active (≥48)
	Type 039C	Yuan	≥1		AIP equipped
	Type 039B	Yuan	16		AIP equipped
	Type 039A	Yuan	4		AIP equipped
	Project 636M	Improved Kilo	8		
	Project 636	Improved Kilo	2		
	Type 039 / 039G	Song	13		
	Type 035B	Ming	4		
In reserve (≤10)
	Type 035G	Ming	Up to 10		In reserve

== Capital surface ships including aircraft carriers ==
The PLAN currently operates 15 capital surface ships.

=== Aircraft carriers ===
Image	Class	NATO designation	Number in service	List of ships	Notes
Active (3)
	Type 003	Fujian	1	Fujian (18)	CATOBAR carrier
	Type 002	Modified Kuznetsov	1	Shandong (17)	STOBAR carrier
	Type 001	Kuznetsov	1	Liaoning (16)	STOBAR carrier
Future (≥1)
	Type 004		≥1	Type 004 aircraft carrier	Nuclear-powered CATOBAR supercarrier

=== Amphibious assault ships and aerial drone carriers ===
Image	Class	NATO designation	Number in service	List of ships	Notes
Active (4)
	Type 075	Yushen	4	List of Type 075 landing helicopter dock	Amphibious assault ships
Future (1)
	Type 076	Yulan		Sichuan (51)	Drone carrier-amphibious assault ships. The first ship of the class is now undergoing sea trial.

=== Amphibious transport docks ===
Image	Class	NATO designation	Number in service	List of ships	Notes
Active (8)
	Type 071	Yuzhao	8, 5 on order	List of Type 071 amphibious transport docks	

=== Submarine drone mothership ===
Image	Class	NATO designation	Number in service	List of ships	Notes
Under construction (1)
Unknown class					The world’s first mothership designed to deploy large submarine drones

== Major surface combatants ==
The PLAN currently operates 169 or more major surface combatants.

=== Large destroyers (de facto cruisers) ===
Image	Class	NATO designation	Number in service	List of ships	Notes
Active (10)
	Type 055	Renhai	10	List of Type 055 destroyers	

=== Destroyers ===
Image	Class	NATO designation	Number in service	List of ships	Notes
Active (51)
	Type 052D	Luyang III mod Luyang III	35	List of Type 052D destroyers	
	Type 052C	Luyang II	6	List of Type 052D destroyers	
	Type 051C	Luzhou	2	Shenyang (115) Shijiazhuang (116)	
	Project 956EM	Sovremenny III	2	Taizhou (138); Ningbo (139)	Upgraded, VLS installed
	Project 956E	Sovremenny II	2	Hangzhou (136); Fuzhou (137)	Upgraded, VLS installed
	Type 052B	Luyang I	2	Guangzhou (168); Wuhan (169)	Upgraded, VLS installed
	Type 051B	Luhai	1	Shenzhen (167)	Upgraded, VLS installed
	Type 052	Luhu	1	Qingdao (113)	The last active Destroyer of the PLAN without VLS

=== Frigates ===
Image	Class	NATO designation	Number in service	List of ships	Notes
Active (58)
	Type 054B	Jiangkai III	2	Luohe (545) Qinzhou (555)	
	Type 054A	Jiangkai II	46	List of Type 054A frigates	
	Type 054	Jiangkai	2	Ma'anshan (525); Wenzhou (526)	
	Type 053H3	Jiangwei II Jiangwei II Upgrade	2 6	List of 053H3 frigates	

=== Corvettes ===
Image	Class	NATO designation	Number in service	List of ships	Notes
Active (50)
	Type 056A	Jiangdao	50	List of Type 056 corvettes	An additional 22 Type 056s have been in service with the China Coast Guard since 2021.

== Small surface combatants ==
=== Fast attack crafts ===
Image	Class	NATO designation	Type	Number in service	Notes
Active (~90)
	Type 022	Houbei	Missile boat	60 (est.)	
	Type 037II	Houjian	Missile boat	22 (est.)	
	Type 037IG	Houxin	Missile boat	22 (est.)	
	Type 037IS	Haiqing	Submarine chaser	Some	
	Type 062-1	Shanghai III	Gunboat	Up to 10	

=== Mine warfare ships ===
Image	Class	NATO designation	Type	Number in service	List of ships	Notes
Active (>40)
	Type 081A	Wochi	Ocean mine countermeasure ship	10+		
	Type 081	Wochi	Ocean mine countermeasure ship	4		
	Type 082II	Wozang	Ocean mine countermeasure ship	10+		
	Type 082I	Wosao II	Coastal minesweeper	12		
	Type 082	Wosao I	Coastal minesweeper	4		

== Amphibious landing ships and crafts ==
Amphibious warfare ships excluding the amphibious assault ships and amphibious transport docks.

=== Amphibious landing bridging barges ===
Image	Class	NATO designation	Number in service	List of ships	Notes
Active (≥2 sets)
	PLA Navy landing barges		≥2 sets		A set of three barges is used together.

=== Amphibious landing ships ===
Image	Class	NATO designation	Number in service	List of ships	Notes
Active (>70)
	Type 072B	Yuting II	6		Landing ship tank
	Type 072A	Yuting II	15	List of Type 072A landing ships	Landing ship tank
	Type 072IIIHG	Yuting I	5		Landing ship tank
	Type 072III	Yuting I	4		Landing ship tank
	Type 072II	Yukan	3	List of Type 072II landing ships	Landing ship tank
	Type 073A	Yunshu	10		Landing ship medium
	Type 073III	Yudeng	1		Landing ship medium
	Type 074A	Yubei	10		Landing ship medium
	Type 074	Yuhai	15-16	List of Type 074 landing ships	Landing ship medium

=== Amphibious air-cushioned landing craft ===
Image	Class	NATO designation	Number in service	List of ships	Notes
Active (>69)
	Project 1232.2	Pomornik	6		Chinese designation is "Type 958"
	Type 726A	Yuyi	Air-cushioned landing craft	>40	Carried by Type 071 LPDs and also Type 075 and Type 076 LHDs
	Type 726	Yuyi	3		
	Type 724	Payi	20		

=== Amphibious landing crafts ===
Image	Class	NATO designation	Type	Number in service	Notes
Active (~10)
		Yubu	Landing craft mechanized	10+	
	Type 067A	Yunnan	Landing craft mechanized	Some	

== Auxiliary ship fleet ==
Column headings include: "Type" (i.e. Chinese class designation), the types "NATO designation", the ships "Pennant number" (or hull number), the ships name in English and Chinese (Han 中文), ships "Displacement" in tonnes, and the "Fleet" in which it serves (e.g. North Sea Fleet, South Sea Fleet and East Sea Fleet). The "Status" column is colour coded, green indicates relatively new and modern classes in service, while red indicates obsolescence and being in the process of decommissioning as newer types are brought into service. A third colour, blue, specifically indicates a ship which is not yet in commission, but has been launched and is in the final stages of construction, or has been handed over for sea trials. Any ships with a status colour of blue is not yet counted towards the total number of active ships.

=== Training ships ===
In addition to regular training ships, some retired warships are also converted as stationary training facilities at various military academies for active use, and thus remain on Chinese naval registry.

Type	NATO designation	Pennant No.	Name (English)	Name (Han 中文)	Commissioned	Displacement	Fleet	Status
Daguan-class barracks ship / troopship / training ship	Daguan class	88	Xu Xiake	徐霞客	2011	30000 t	North Sea Fleet	Active
Daguan-class barracks ship / troopship / training ship	Daguan class	89	Li Daoyuan	郦道元	2018	30000 t	North Sea Fleet	Active
Type 679 training ship	Daxin class	81	Zheng He	郑和	1986	5,548 t	Dalian Naval Academy	Active
Type 0891A training ship	Dashi class	82	Shichang	世昌	1997	9,700 t	Dalian Naval Academy	Active
Type 680 training ship	Dadu class	83	Qi Jiguang	戚继光	2017	9,000 t	Dalian Naval Academy	Active
Type 2630 training ship	?	86	Brave the wave	破浪	2017	1,200 t	Dalian Naval Academy	Active
Type 051 destroyer	Luda class	Ex-106	Ex-Xi'an	西安	October 2007	3,250 t	PLA Naval University of Engineering	Active (stationary training facility)
Type 051Z destroyer	Luda class	Ex-132	Ex-Hefei	合肥	October 2012	3,250 t	PLA Naval Aviation University	Active (stationary training facility)
Type 6607 destroyer	Anshan class	104	Taiyuan	太原	1991	2,150 t	Dalian Naval Academy	Active (stationary training facility)
Type 033 submarine	Romeo class	Ex-303	Ex-Great Wall 107	长城107号	October 2009	1,830 t	PLA Naval University of Engineering	Active (stationary training facility)
Type 053H1Q frigate	Jianghu-IV class	Ex-544	Ex-Siping renamed as Lüshun	旅顺	2005	1,860 t	Dalian Naval Academy	Active
Yanxi-class drone mothership/training ship	Yanxi class	Xun 701	Training 701	训 701	1970	1,200 t	Dalian Naval Academy	Active

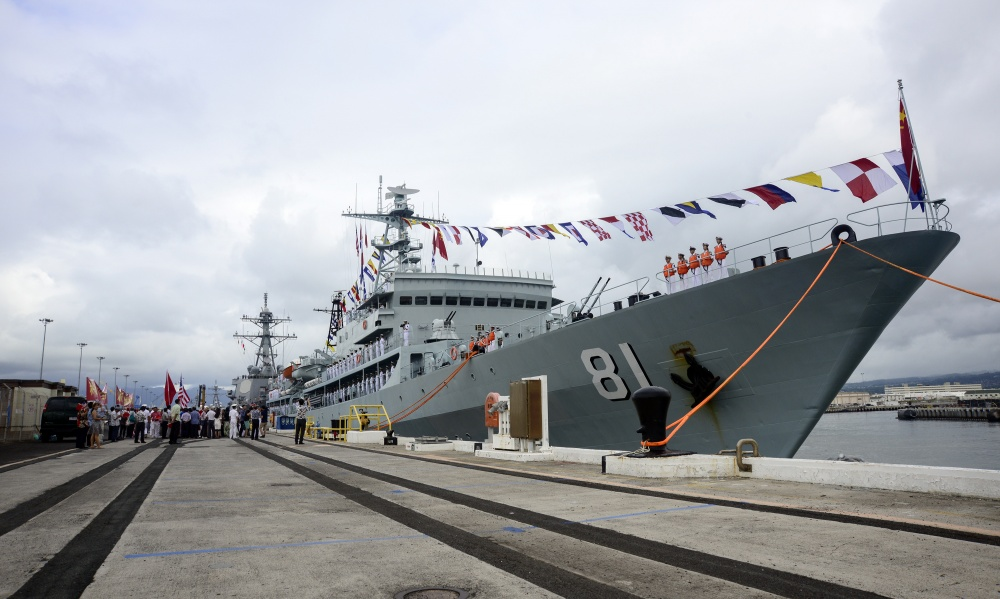
Type 679 training ship "Zheng He"

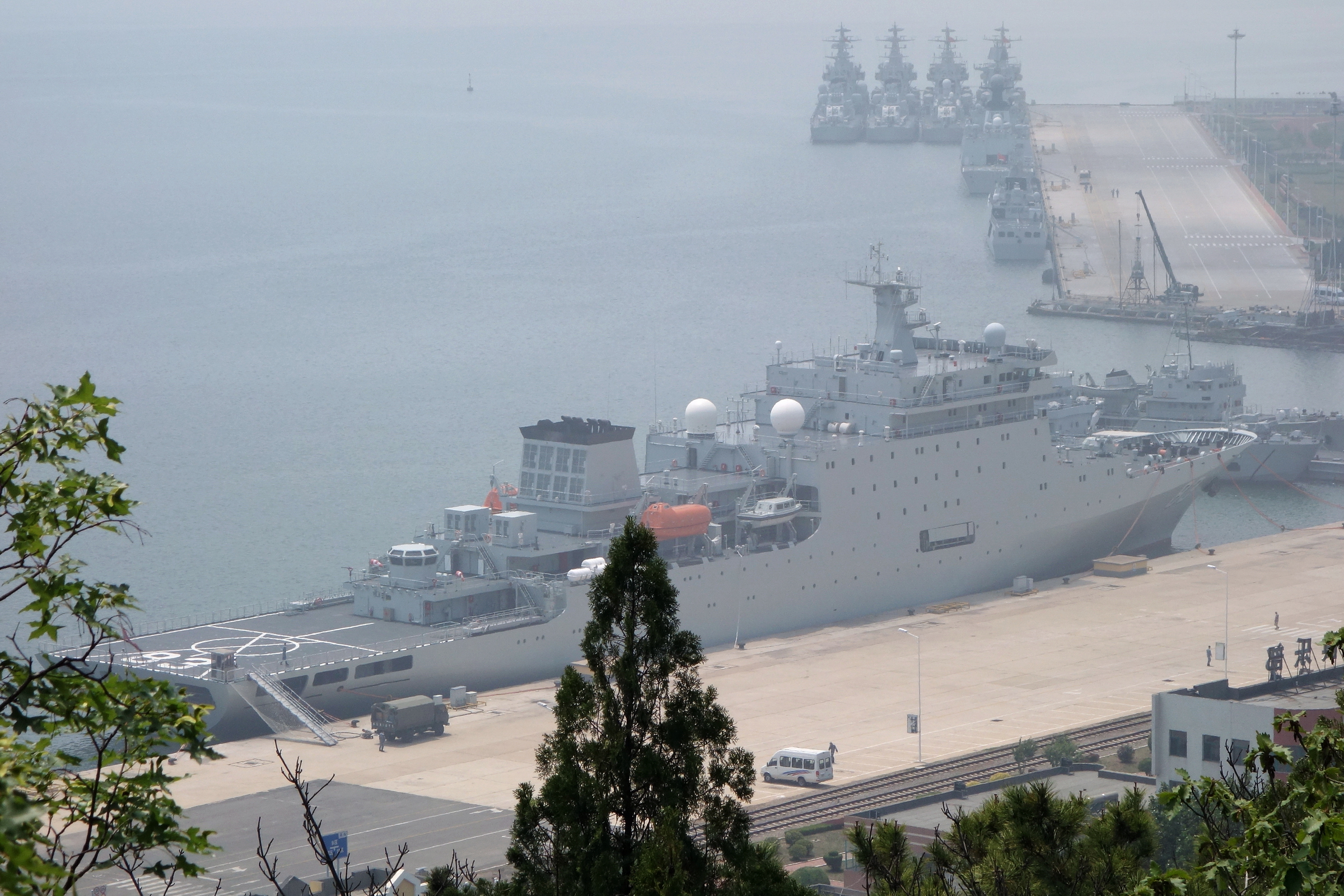
Type 680 training ship "Qi Jiguang"

=== Tracking ships ===
List of tracking ships:

Type	NATO designation	Pennant No.	Name (English)	Name (Han 中文)	Commissioned	Displacement	Fleet	Status
Type 830 range instrumentation ship / rescue tug	Tuozhong class	Dong-Tuo 830	East Tug 830	东拖 830	December 1977	4000 t	East Sea Fleet	Active
Type 830 range instrumentation ship / rescue tug	Tuozhong class	Nan-Tuo 154	South Tug 154	南拖 154	September 1979	4000 t	South Sea Fleet	Active
Yuan Wang-class space exploration tracking ship / range instrumentation ship	Yuan Wang class	Yuan-Wang 3	Long View 3	远望 3	May 1995	17000 t	PLA SSF	Active
Yuan Wang-class space exploration tracking ship / range instrumentation ship	Yuan Wang class	Yuan-Wang 5	Long View 5	远望 5	September 29, 2007	25000 t	PLA SSF	Active
Yuan Wang-class space exploration tracking ship / range instrumentation ship	Yuan Wang class	Yuan-Wang 6	Long View 6	远望 6	2007	25000 t	PLA SSF	Active
Yuan Wang-class space exploration tracking ship / range instrumentation ship	Yuan Wang class	Yuan-Wang 7	Long View 7	远望 7	July 19, 2016	25000 t	PLA SSF	Active

=== Spy ships ===
List of PLAN spy ships :

Type	NATO designation	Pennant No.	Name (English)	Name (Han 中文)	Commissioned	Displacement	Fleet	Status
Type 815A	Dongdiao II class	796 (ex-856)	Mizar	开阳星	2017	6,600 t	North Sea Fleet	Active
Type 815A	Dongdiao II class	797 (ex-857)	Megrez	天枢星	2017	6,600 t	South Sea Fleet	Active
Type 815A	Dongdiao II class	798 (ex-858)	Alioth	玉衡星	2018	6,600 t	South Sea Fleet	Active
Type 815A	Dongdiao II class	799 (ex-859)	Venus	金星	2018	6,600 t	South Sea Fleet	Active
Type 815G	Dongdiao II class	793 (ex-853)	Uranus	天王星	2010	6,600 t	South Sea Fleet	Active
Type 815G	Dongdiao II class	794 (ex-854)	Sirius	天狼星	2015	6,600 t	North Sea Fleet	Active
Type 815G	Dongdiao II class	795 (ex-855)	Dubhe	天权星	2015	6,600 t	East Sea Fleet	Active
Type 815G	Dongdiao II class	792 (ex-852)	Neptune	海王星	2015	6,600 t	South Sea Fleet	Active
Type 815	Dongdiao I class	791 (ex-851)	Polaris	北极星	1999	6,600 t	East Sea Fleet	Active
Type 814A	Dadie class	Beidiao 900	Xiang Yang Hong 28	向阳红28号	1986	2,550 t	North Sea Fleet	Active
Type 792	FT-14 AIT class	Zhan-Yu 819	Zhanjiang Fishing 819	湛渔 819	1989 onward	600 t	All fleets	Active
Type 792	FT-14 AIT class	Zhan-Yu 820	Zhanjiang Fishing 820	湛渔 820	1989 onward	600 t	All fleets	Active
Type 792	FT-14 AIT class	Zhan-Yu 821	Zhanjiang Fishing 821	湛渔 821	1989 onward	600 t	All fleets	Active
Type 792	FT-14 AIT class	Zhan-Yu 822	Zhanjiang Fishing 822	湛渔 822	1989 onward	600 t	All fleets	Active
Type 792	FT-14 AIT class	Zhe-Hai-Yu 626	Zhejiang Haining Fishing 626	浙海渔 626	1989 onward	600 t	All fleets	Active
Type 792	FT-14 AIT class	Zhe-Hai-Yu 627	Zhejiang Haining Fishing 627	浙海渔 627	1989 onward	600 t	All fleets	Active
Type 792	FT-14 AIT class	Zhe-Hai-Yu 628	Zhejiang Haining Fishing 628	浙海渔 628	1989 onward	600 t	All fleets	Active
Type 792	FT-14 AIT class	Zhe-Hai-Yu 629	Zhejiang Haining Fishing 629	浙海渔 629	1989 onward	600 t	All fleets	Active
Type 8154	FT-14 AIT class	Various	Various	Various	1981 onward	600 t	All fleets	Active
Type 8105	FT-14 AIT class	Various	Various	Various	1981 onward	600 t	All fleets	Active

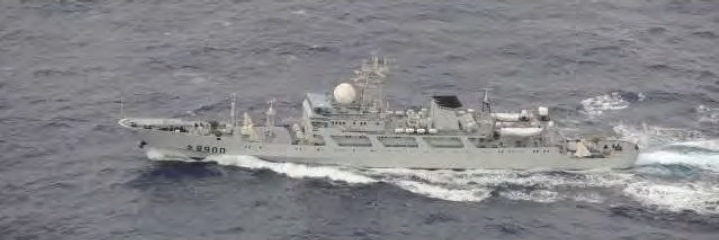
Type 814A (Dadie class)

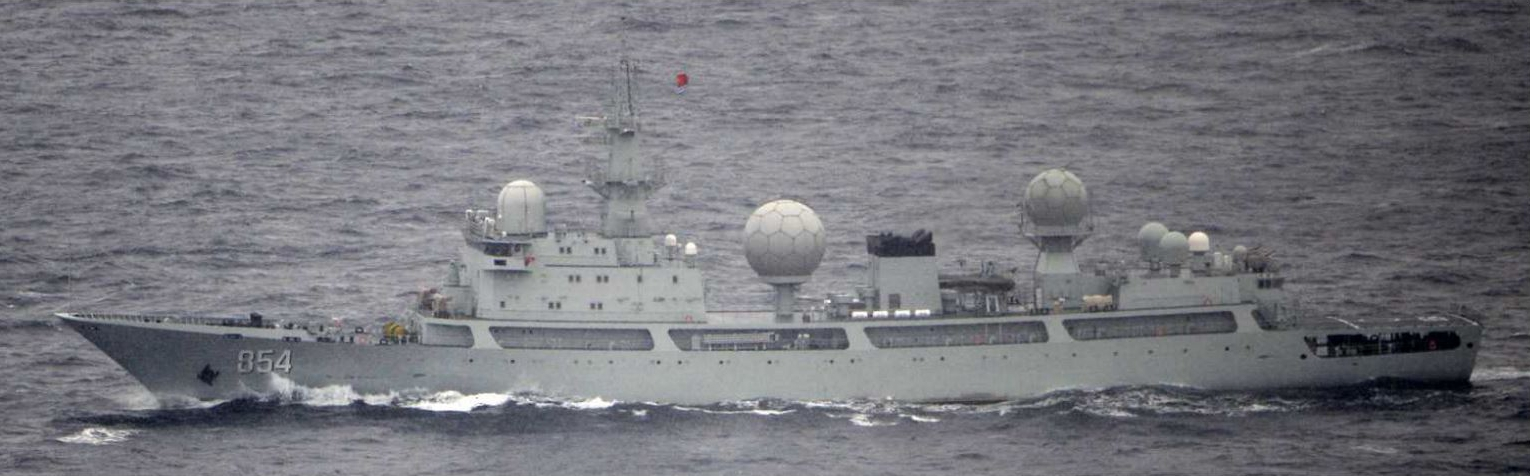
Type 815 (Dongdiao class)

=== Fleet replenishment ===
Type	NATO designation	Pennant No.	Name (English)	Name (Han 中文)	Commissioned	Displacement	Fleet	Status
Type 901 fast combat support ship	Fuyu class	901 (Ex-965)	Hulun Lake	呼伦湖	2017	48,000 t		Active
Type 901 fast combat support ship	Fuyu class	905 (Ex-967)	Chagan Lake	查干湖	2018	48,000 t	South Sea fleet	Active
Type 904B general stores issue ship	Danyao II class	962	Lugu Lake	泸沽湖	2015	15,000 t	South Sea Fleet	Active
Type 904B general stores issue ship	Danyao II class	961	Junshan Lake	军山湖	2015	15,000 t	South Sea Fleet	Active
Type 904A general stores issue ship	Danyao I class	888	Fuxian Lake	抚仙湖	2007	15,000 t	South Sea Fleet	Active
Type 904 general stores issue ship	Dayun class	883	Dongting Lake	洞庭湖	1992	11,000 t	South Sea Fleet	Active
Type 903 replenishment ship	Fuchi I class	886	Qiandao Lake	千岛湖	2004	25,000 t	East Sea Fleet	Active
Type 903 replenishment ship	Fuchi I class	887	Weishan Lake	微山湖	2004	25,000 t	South Sea Fleet	Active
Type 903A replenishment ship	Fuchi II class	889	Tai Lake	太湖	2013	25,000 t	North Sea Fleet	Active
Type 903A replenishment ship	Fuchi II class	890	Chao Lake	巢湖	2013	25,000 t	East Sea Fleet	Active
Type 903A replenishment ship	Fuchi II class	902	Dongping Lake	东平湖	2015	25,000 t	North Sea Fleet	Active
Type 903A replenishment ship	Fuchi II class	904	Gaoyou Lake	高邮湖	2016	25,000 t	East Sea Fleet	Active
Type 903A replenishment ship	Fuchi II class	906	Hong Lake	洪湖	2016	25,000 t	South Sea Fleet	Active
Type 903A replenishment ship	Fuchi II class	907	Luoma Lake	骆马湖	2016	25,000 t	South Sea Fleet	Active
Type 903A replenishment ship	Fuchi II class	903	Kekexili Lake	可可西里湖	2019	25,000 t	North Sea Fleet	Active
Type 903A replenishment ship	Fuchi II class	892				25,000 t		Active
Type 903A replenishment ship	Fuchi II class	893				25,000 t		Active
Type 908 replenishment ship	Fusu class	885	Qinghai Lake	青海湖	1999	37,000 t	South Sea Fleet	Active

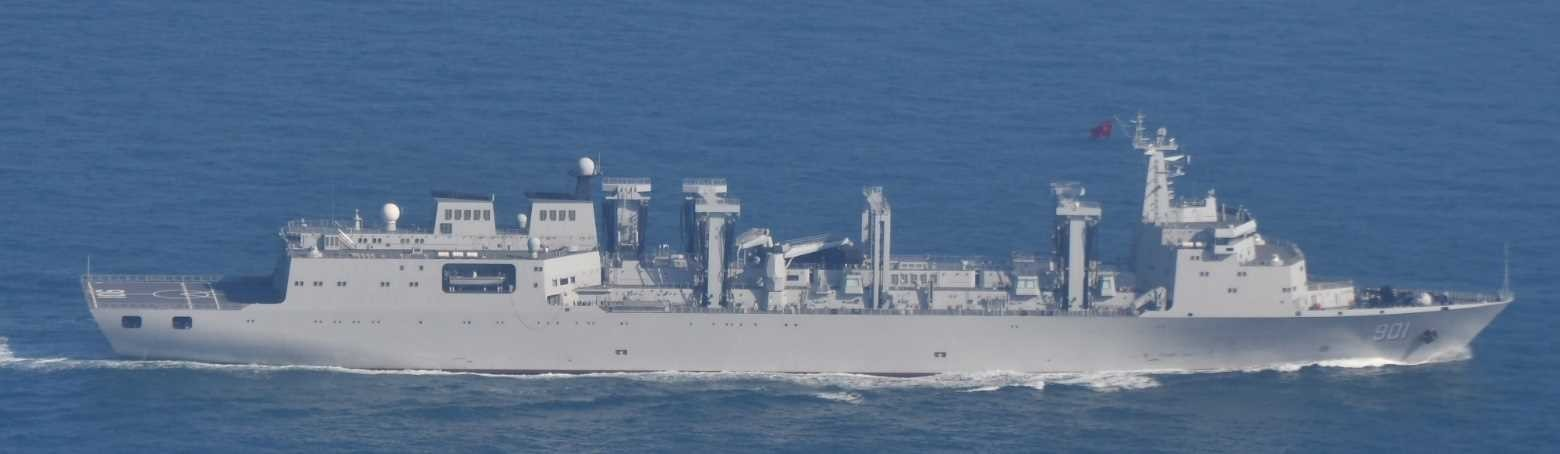
Type 901 (Fuyu class)

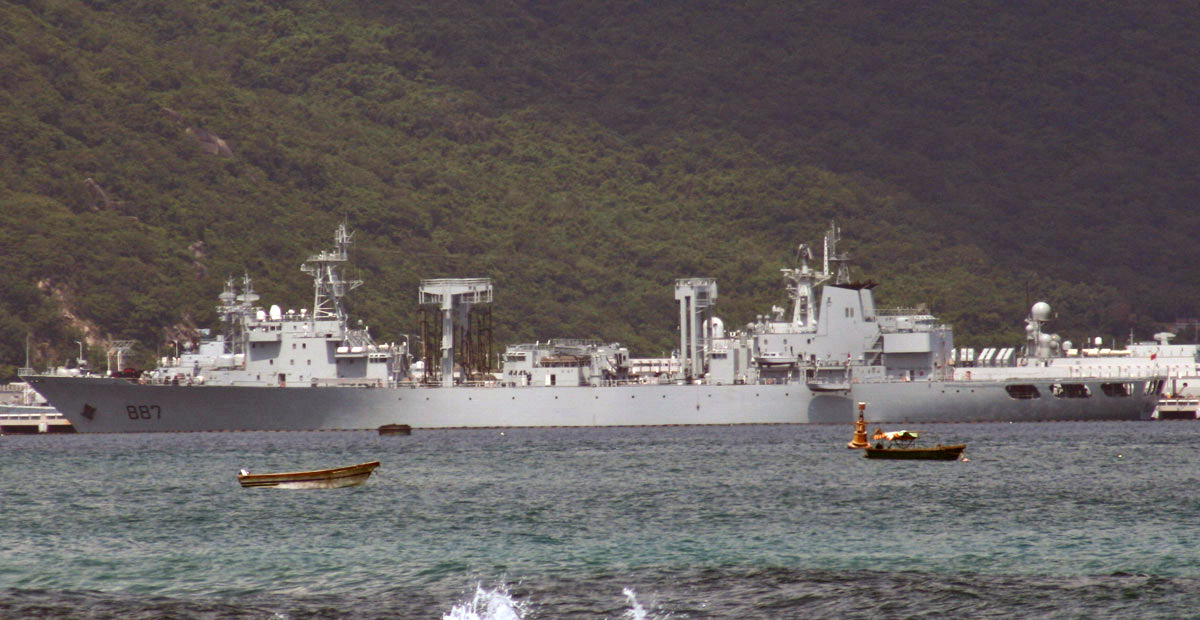
Type 903 (Qiandaohu class)

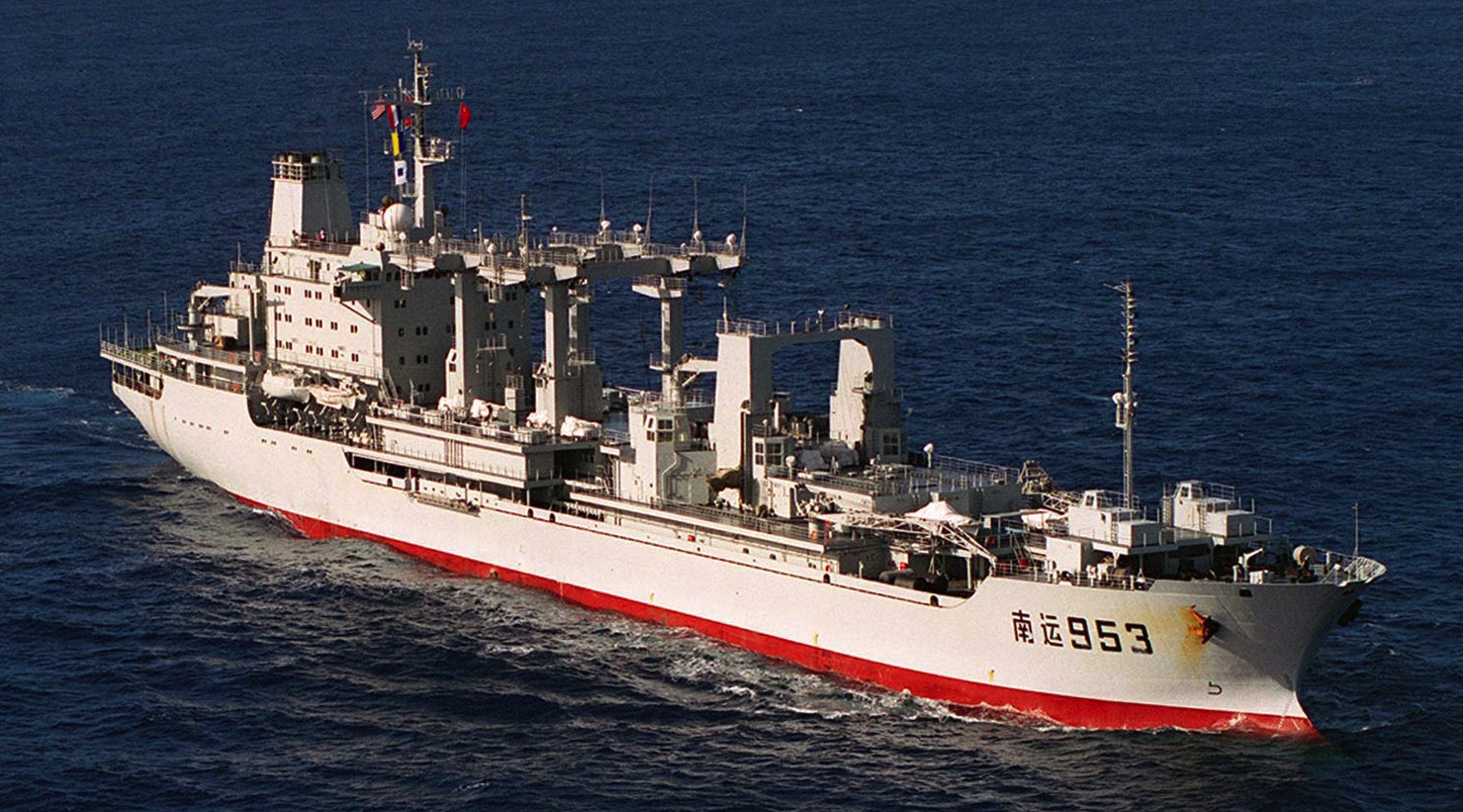
Type 908 (Fusu class)

=== Hospital Ships ===
List of PLAN hospital ships :

Type	NATO designation	Pennant No.	Name (English)	Name (Han 中文)	Commissioned	Displacement	Fleet	Status
Ankang-class ambulance craft	Ankang class	Bei-Yi 01	North Medic 01	北医 01	Mid-2010s	? t	North Sea Fleet	Active
Ankang-class ambulance craft	Ankang class	Dong-Yi 12	East Medic 12	东医 12	Mid-2010s	? t	East Sea Fleet	Active
Ankang-class ambulance craft	Ankang class	Dong-Yi 13	East Medic 13	东医 13	Mid-2010s	? t	East Sea Fleet	Active
Ankang-class ambulance craft	Ankang class	Nan-Yi 10	South Medic 10	南医 10	Mid-2010s	? t	South Sea Fleet	Active
Ankang-class ambulance craft	Ankang class	Nan-Yi 11	South Medic 11	南医 11	Mid-2010s	? t	South Sea Fleet	Active
Chinese medical evacuation ship Zhuanghe	?	865	Zhuanghe	庄河	2004	24,043 gt	South Sea Fleet	Active
Huayuankou cargo ship, medical evacuation	?	?	Huayuankou	花园口	1990s	5,986 gt	South Sea Fleet	Active
Qiongsha-class ambulance transport	Qiongsha class	Y833	Nankang	南康	1986	2150 t	South Sea Fleet	Active
Type 919 hospital ship	Anshen class	Nan-Yi 12	South Medic 12	南医 12	2020	4,000-5,000 t	South Sea Fleet	Active
Type 919 hospital ship	Anshen class	Nan-Yi 13	South Medic 13	南医 13	2020	4,000-5,000 t	South Sea Fleet	Active
Type 920 hospital ship	Anwei class	866	Daishan Dao/Peace Ark	岱山岛	2007	14,300 t		Active
Type 920 hospital ship	Anwei class	867	Silk Road Ark	丝路方舟	2024	10,000+ t		Active

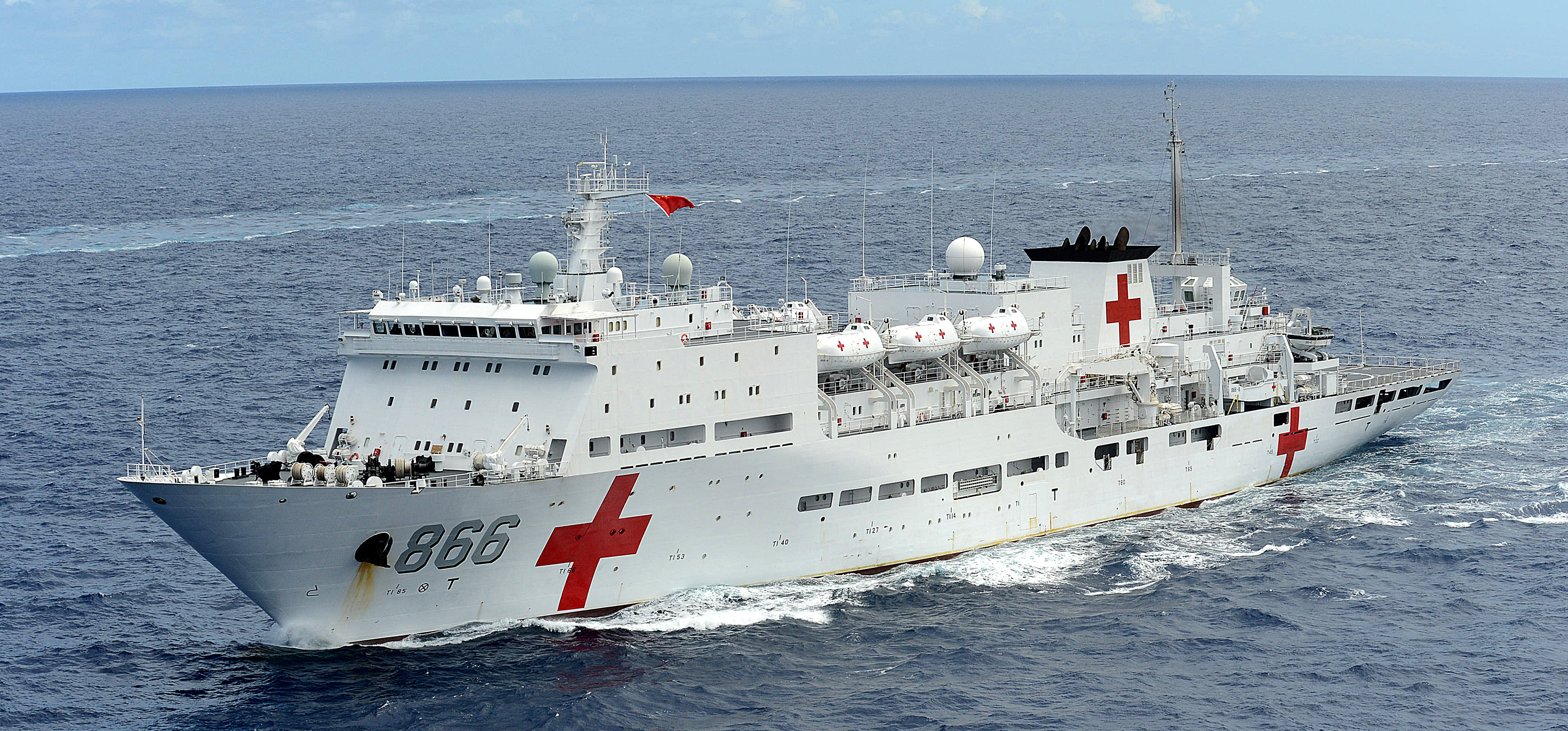
Type 920 "Peace Ark"

=== Icebreakers ===
List of PLAN icebreakers:

Type	NATO designation	Pennant No.	Name (English)	Name (Han 中文)	Commissioned	Displacement	Fleet	Status
Type 272 icebreaker	Yanrao class	Hai-bing 722	Sea Ice 722	海冰 722	January 1, 2016	4860 t	North Sea Fleet	Active
Type 272 icebreaker	Yanrao class	Hai-bing 723	Sea Ice 723	海冰 723	March 17, 2016	4860 t	North Sea Fleet	Active

=== Diving support vessels ===
List of PLAN diving support vessels:

Type	NATO designation	Pennant No.	Name (English)	Name (Han 中文)	Commissioned	Displacement	Fleet	Status
Longma-class dive tender / rescue ship	Longma class	Bei-Jiu 141	North Rescue 141	北救 141	?	? t	North Sea Fleet	Active
Longma-class dive tender / rescue ship	Longma class	Bei-Jiu 142	North Rescue 142	北救 142	?	? t	North Sea Fleet	Active
Longma-class dive tender / rescue ship	Longma class	Nan-Jiu 507	South Rescue 507	南救 507	?	? t	South Sea Fleet	Active
Type 904I dive tender / research ship	Yanqian class	Kan-Cha No. 1	Survey No. 1	勘查一号	August 1981	1354 t	All fleets	Active
Type 904II dive tender / research ship	Yanqian class	Kan-Cha No. 2	Survey No. 2	勘查二号	May 1983	1327 t	All fleets	Active

=== Rescue and salvage ships ===
Type	NATO designation	Pennant No.	Name (English)	Name (Han 中文)	Commissioned	Displacement	Fleet	Status
Datuo-class rescue and salvage ship	Datuo class	Bei-Tuo 742	North Tug 742	北拖 742	?	? t	North Sea Fleet	Active
Datuo-class rescue and salvage ship	Datuo class	Nan-Tuo 159	South Tug 159	南拖 159	?	? t	South Sea Fleet	Active
Datuo-class rescue and salvage ship	Datuo class	Nan-Tuo 194	South Tug 194	南拖 194	?	? t	South Sea Fleet	Active
Datuo-class rescue and salvage ship	Datuo class	Nan-Tuo 196	South Tug 196	南拖 196	?	? t	South Sea Fleet	Active
Datuo-class rescue and salvage ship	Datuo class	Various	Various	Various	?	? t	?	Under construction
Haijiu 101-class rescue and salvage ship	Haijiu (Hai Jiu) 101 class	Bei-Jiu 739	North Rescue 739	北救739	?	? t	North Sea Fleet	Active
Haijiu 101-class rescue and salvage ship	Haijiu (Hai Jiu) 101 class	Bei-Jiu 742	North Rescue 742	北救742	?	? t	North Sea Fleet	Active
Haijiu 101-class rescue and salvage ship	Haijiu (Hai Jiu) 101 class	Bei-Jiu 743	North Rescue 743	北救743	?	? t	North Sea Fleet	Active
Haijiu 101-class rescue and salvage ship	Haijiu (Hai Jiu) 101 class	Nan-Jiu 171	South Rescue 171	南救 171	?	? t	South Sea Fleet	Active
Haijiu 101-class rescue and salvage ship	Haijiu (Hai Jiu) 101 class	Nan-Jiu 195	South Rescue 195	南救 195	?	? t	South Sea Fleet	Active
Haijiu 101-class rescue and salvage ship	Haijiu (Hai Jiu) 101 class	Nan-Jiu 198	South Rescue 198	南救 198	?	? t	South Sea Fleet	Active
Haijiu 101-class rescue and salvage ship	Haijiu (Hai Jiu) 101 class	Various	Various	Various	?	? t	?	Under construction
Longma-class dive tender / rescue ship	Longma class	Bei-Jiu 141	North Rescue 141	北救 141	?	? t	North Sea Fleet	Active
Longma-class dive tender / rescue ship	Longma class	Bei-Jiu 142	North Rescue 142	北救 142	?	? t	North Sea Fleet	Active
Longma-class dive tender / rescue ship	Longma class	Nan-Jiu 507	South Rescue 507	南救 507	?	? t	South Sea Fleet	Active
Type 633 heavy-lift ship	?	Nan-Bo 46	South Barge 46	南驳 46	?	? t	South Sea Fleet	Active
Type 917 rescue ship	Dasan class	Bei-Jiu 143	North Rescue 143	北救 143	2012	? t	North Sea Fleet	Active
Type 917 rescue ship	Dasan class	Dong-Jiu 335	Dong-Jiu 335	东救 335	2012 onward	? t	East Sea Fleet	Active
Type 922IIIA rescue & salvage ship	Dalang III class	Bei-Jiu 138	North Rescue 138	北救 138	1987 onward	? t	North Sea Fleet	Active
Type 922IIIA rescue & salvage ship	Dalang III class	Dong-Jiu 332	East Rescue 332	东救 332	1987 onward	? t	East Sea Fleet	Active
Type 922IIIA rescue & salvage ship	Dalang III class	Nan-Jiu 501	South Rescue 501	南救 501	1987 onward	? t	South Sea Fleet	Active
Type 922III rescue & salvage ship	Dalang II class	Bei-Jiu 122	North Rescue 122	北救 122	March 31, 1987	? t	North Sea Fleet	Active
Type 922II rescue & salvage ship	Dalang class	Nan-Jiu 503	South Rescue 503	南救 503	December 1976	4450 t	South Sea Fleet	Active
Unknown	Unknown	834	Yinma Lake	饮马湖	?	?	Presumably South Sea Fleet	Active

=== Submarine support (rescue and supply) ships ===
Modern submarine support ships of the PLAN fulfill both rescue and supply roles.

Type	NATO designation	Pennant No.	Name (English)	Name (Han 中文)	Commissioned	Displacement	Fleet	Status
Type 927 submarine support ship	Dakai Class	830	Jingpohu	镜泊湖	2023	13800 t	South Sea Fleet	Active
Type 927 submarine support ship	Dakai Class	841	West Lake	西湖	2024	13800 t	North Sea Fleet	Active
Type 927 submarine support ship	Dakai Class	840	N/A	N/A	2024	13800 t	North Sea Fleet	Active
Type 926 submarine support ship	Dalao class	864	Oceanic Island	海洋岛	2010	7600t	North Sea Fleet	Active
Type 926 submarine support ship	Dalao class	865	Liugong Island	刘公岛	2012 onward	7600 t	North Sea Fleet	Active
Type 926 submarine support ship	Dalao class	867	Long Island	长岛	2012 onward	7600 t	South Sea Fleet	Active
Type 925 submarine support ship	Dajiang class	Bei-Jiu (北救) 121	Changxing Island	长兴岛	November 1979	10087 t	North Sea Fleet	Active
Type 925 submarine support ship	Dajiang class	Dong-Jiu (东救) 302	Chongming Island	崇明岛	1980s	10087 t	East Sea Fleet	Active
Type 925 submarine support ship	Dajiang class	Nan-Jiu (南救) 506	Yongxing Island	永兴岛	1980s	10087 t	South Sea Fleet	Active
Type 930 submarine rescue ship	Hudong class	J301	Sea Rescue 512	海救 512	July 30, 1969	2500 t	East Sea Fleet	Active
Type 946 submarine rescue ship	Dazhou class	Bei-Jiu 137	North Rescue 137	北救 137	December 26, 1977	1100 t	North Sea Fleet	Active
Type 946 submarine rescue ship	Dazhou class	Nan-Jiu 502	South Rescue 502	南救 502	December 26, 1977	1100 t	South Sea Fleet	Active
Type 946A submarine rescue ship	Dadong class	Dong-Jiu 304	East Rescue 304	东救 304	December 1982	1500 t	East Sea Fleet	Active

=== Submersibles ===
Most submersibles , especially bathyscaphes are civilian agencies owned but also carry out PLAN missions, while some are jointly owned/funded and operated by Chinese military and civilian agencies.

Type	NATO designation	Classification	Pennant No.	Name (English)	Name (Han 中文)	Commissioned	Displacement	Status
Deep Sea Warrior	?	Bathyscaphe	Shen-Hai-Yong-Shi	Deep Sea Warrior	深海勇士	2016	20 t	Active
LR7	?	Rescue submersible	Shen-Hai 120	Deep Sea 120	深海 120	2009	20 t	Active
Mobile diving bell	?	Submersible	Various	Not named	Not named	?	10.5 t	Active
Osprey class	?	Submersible	Yu-Ying 1	Ospray 1	鱼鹰 1	1989	14.18 t	Active
Osprey class	?	Submersible	Yu-Ying 1	Ospray 2	鱼鹰 2	1989	14.18 t	Active
QSZ-II	?	Submersible	Various	Not named	Not named	?	? t	Active
Rainbowfish	?	Bathyscaphe	Cai-Hong-Yu	Rainbowfish	彩虹鱼	Late 2010s	? t	Active
Sea Pole class	?	Bathyscaphe	Hai-Ji 1	Sea Pole 1	海极 1	2009 onward	24 t	Active
Sea Pole class	?	Bathyscaphe	He-Xie	Harmony	和谐	2009 onward	22.9 t	Active
Sea Pole class	?	Bathyscaphe	Jiao-Long	Flood Dragon	蛟龙	2010	22 t	Active
Struggler	?	Bathyscaphe	Fen-Dou-Zhe	Struggler	奋斗者	2020	36 t	Active
Type 7103	?	Rescue submersible	Various	Not named	Not named	1987	35 t	Active

=== Repair ships ===
List of repair ships:

Type	NATO designation	Pennant No.	Name (English)	Name (Han 中文)	Commissioned	Displacement	Fleet	Status
120 ton-class repair dry dock	?	809	Not named	Not named	1971	518 t	East Sea Fleet	Active
Dongxiu 912-class repair dry dock	?	Dong-Xiu 912	East Repair 912	东修 912	?	? t	East Sea Fleet	Active
Type 648 repair ship	Dadao class	Dong-Xiu 911	East Repair 911	东修 911	January 1985	1900 t	East Sea Fleet	Active
Hua Chuan No. 1-class repair dry dock	?	?	Hua Chuan No. 1	华船一号	2016	13000 t	East Sea Fleet	Active

=== Engineering Ships ===
Type	NATO designation	Pennant No.	Name (English)	Name (Han 中文)	Commissioned	Displacement	Fleet	Status
Engineering ship of unidentified type/class	?	Bei-Gong 275	North Engineering 275	北工 275	?	? t	North Sea Fleet	Active
Engineering ship of unidentified type/class	?	Bei-Gong 276	North Engineering 276	北工 276	?	? t	North Sea Fleet	Active

=== Environmental research ships ===
List of Environmental research ship:

Type	NATO designation	Pennant No.	Name (English)	Name (Han 中文)	Commissioned	Displacement	Fleet	Status
Dulaji-class environmental research ship	Dulaji class	Bei-Jian 04	North Monitor 04	北监 04	?	300 t	North Sea Fleet	Active
Dulaji-class environmental research ship	Dulaji class	Bei-Jian 10	North Monitor 10	北监 10	?	300 t	North Sea Fleet	Active
Dulaji-class environmental research ship	Dulaji class	Dong-Jian 06	East Monitor 06	东监 06	?	300 t	East Sea Fleet	Active
Dulaji-class environmental research ship	Dulaji class	Nan-Jian 03	South Monitor 03	南监 03	?	300 t	South Sea Fleet	Active

=== General purpose research ships ===
List of research ships:

Type	NATO designation	Pennant No.	Name (English)	Name (Han 中文)	Commissioned	Displacement	Fleet	Status
Beidiao 990 ferry / research ship	Kanwu class	Bei-Diao 990	Bei-Diao 990	北调 990	December 2009	380 t	North Sea Fleet	Active
Beidiao 991 multipurpose research ship	Kandao class	Bei-Diao 991	North Investigation 991	北调 991	April 2008	1441 t	North Sea Fleets	Active
Beidiao 993 sonar trials ship / research ship	Kantan class	Bei-Diao 993	North Investigation 991	北调 991	April 2008	1441 t	North Sea Fleets	Active
Dubei-class target ship / research ship	Dubei class	Shi-Yan 216	Experiment 216	试验 216	2015	? t	?	Active
Dubei-class target ship / research ship	Dubei class	Dong-Ba 01	East Target 01	东靶 01	2015 onward	? t	East Sea Fleet	Active
Dubei-class target ship / research ship	Dubei class	Nan-Ba 11	South Target 11	南靶 11	2015 onward	? t	South Sea Fleet	Active
Dubei-class target ship / research ship	Dubei class	Various	Various	Various	2015 onward	? t	?	Under construction
Type 904I dive tender / research ship	Yanqian class	Kan-Cha No. 1	Survey No. 1	勘查一号	August 1981	1354 t	All fleets	Active
Type 904II dive tender / research ship	Yanqian class	Kan-Cha No. 2	Survey No. 2	勘查二号	May 1983	1327 t	All fleets	Active
Type 906 torpedo trials craft / research ship	Xiang Yang Hong 9 class	Kan-Cha 3	Survey No. 3	勘查三号	January 1987	2300 t	All fleets	Active

=== Technical research ships ===
List of technical research ships:

Type	NATO designation	Pennant No.	Name (English)	Name (Han 中文)	Commissioned	Displacement	Fleet	Status
Chinese sailless submarine (2018)	?	Unknown	Unknown	Unknown	2019	? t	All fleets	Active
Beidiao 993 sonar trials ship / research ship	Kantan class	Bei-Diao 993	North Investigation 993	北调 993	December 2000	2300 t	North Sea Fleet	Active
Chinese technical research ship Mirage Hunter	?	Huan-Yin-Lie-Shou	Mirage Hunter	幻影猎手	2012	? t	Used for stealth research	Active

=== Oceanographic surveillance ships ===
List of Oceanographic surveillance ships:

Type	NATO designation	Pennant No.	Name (English)	Name (Han 中文)	Commissioned	Displacement	Fleet	Status
Chinese oceanographic surveillance ship Ruili No. 10	?	Rui-Li 10	Rui-Li 10	瑞利十号	2016	5300 t	All fleets	Active
Type 927 oceanographic surveillance ship	Dongjian class	780	Beta Ursae Majoris	天璇星	2018	5000 t	South Sea Fleet	Active
Type 927 oceanographic surveillance ship	Dongjian class	781	Gamma Ursae Majoris	天玑星	2019	5000 t	South Sea Fleet	Active
Type 927 oceanographic surveillance ship	Dongjian class	782	Eta Ursae Majoris	瑶光星	2019	5000 t	South Sea Fleet	Active
Type 988 oceanographic surveillance ship	?	Hai-Sheng 582	Hai-Sheng 582	海声 582	1972	590 t	South Sea Fleet	Active

=== Oceanographic research ships ===
List of Oceanographic research ships:

Type	NATO designation	Pennant No.	Name (English)	Name (Han 中文)	Commissioned	Displacement	Fleet	Status
Chinese oceanographic research ship Zhang Jian	?	Not assigned	Zhang Jian	张謇	2016	4800 t	All fleets	Active
Type 639 oceanographic research ship	Kanhai class	Bei-Diao 992	North Investigation 992	北调 992	2008	1500 t	North Sea Fleet	Active
Type 645 oceanographic research ship	?	Nan-Diao 350	South Investigation 350	南调 350	?	4435 t	South Sea Fleet	Active
Type 645 oceanographic research ship	?	Xiang-Yang-Hong 9	Facing the Red Sun 9	向阳红 9	December 1978	4435 t	North Sea Fleet	Active
Type 645 oceanographic research ship	?	Xiang-Yang-Hong 14	Facing the Red Sun 14	向阳红 14	July 1981	4400 t	North Sea Fleet	Active

=== Hydrographic survey ships ===
List of survey ships:

Type	NATO designation	Pennant No.	Name (English)	Name (Han 中文)	Commissioned	Displacement	Fleet	Status
Type 55 hydrographic survey craft	Shantou class	Various	Not named	Not named	converted from retired gunboats	77.5 t	All fleets	Active
Type 068/069 coastal hydrographic survey craft	Yuch'in class	Various	Not named	Not named	?	58 t	All fleets	Active
Type 635A hydrographic survey ship	Yanlai class	Bei-Ce 943	North Survey 943	北测 943	January 1970	1245 t	North Sea Fleet	Active
Type 635B hydrographic survey ship	Yanlai class	Dong-Ce 227	East Survey 227	东测 227	1972	1245 t	East Sea Fleet	Active
Type 635C hydrographic survey ship	Yanlai class	Dong -Ce 226	East Survey 226	东测 226	February 1982	1245 t	East Sea Fleet	Active
Type 635C hydrographic survey ship	Yanlai class	Nan -Ce 427	South Survey 427	南测 427	January 1983	1245 t	South Sea Fleet	Active
Type 635II hydrographic survey ship	Yanlai class	Nan-Ce 470	South Survey 470	南测 470	1980	1245 t	South Sea Fleet	Active
Type 636A hydrographic survey ship	Shupang class	872	Zhu Kezhen	竺可桢	2008	5883 t	All fleets	Active
Type 636A hydrographic survey ship	Shupang class	873	Qian Xuesen	钱学森	December 26, 2015	5883 t	All fleets	Active
Type 636A hydrographic survey ship	Shupang class	874	Deng Jiaxian	邓稼先	February 2, 2016	5883 t	All fleets	Active
Type 636A hydrographic survey ship	Shupang class	875	Qian Sanqiang	钱三强	May 1, 2008	5883 t	All fleets	Active
Type 636A hydrographic survey ship	Shupang class	876	Qian Weichang	钱伟长	July 25, 2016	5883 t	All fleets	Active
Type 636A hydrographic survey ship	Shupang class	877	Chen Jingrun	陈景润	December 8, 2016	5883 t	All fleets	Active
Type 636A hydrographic survey ship	Shupang class	878	Wang Ganchang	王淦昌	After 2016	5883 t	All fleets	Active
Type 636A hydrographic survey ship	Shupang class	879	Zhu Guangya	朱光亚	After 2016	5883 t	All fleets	Active
Type 636A hydrographic survey ship	Shupang class	880	Mao Yisheng	茅以升	After 2016	5883 t	All fleets	Active
Type 639A hydrographic survey ship	Kanhai class	Bei-Ce 901	North Survey 901	北测 901	2015	1500 t	South Sea Fleet	Active
Type 639A hydrographic survey ship	Kanhai class	Bei-Ce 902	North Survey 902	北测 902	2016	1500 t	South Sea Fleet	Active
Type 639A hydrographic survey ship	Kanhai class	Dong-Ce 232	East Survey 232	东测 232	2013	1500 t	South Sea Fleet	Active
Type 639A hydrographic survey ship	Kanhai class	Dong-Ce 233	East Survey 233	东测 233	2015	1500 t	South Sea Fleet	Active
Type 639A hydrographic survey ship	Kanhai class	Nan-Ce 429	South Survey 429	南测 429	2013	1500 t	South Sea Fleet	Active
Type 639A hydrographic survey ship	Kanhai class	Nan-Ce 430	South Survey 430	南测 430	2013	1500 t	South Sea Fleet	Active
Type 646 coastal hydrographic survey ship	Kanyang class	Nan-Ce 426	South Survey 426	南测 426	1983	676 t	South Sea Fleet	Active
Type 646 coastal hydrographic survey ship	Kanyang class	Nan-Ce 428	South Survey 428	南测 428	1983	676 t	South Sea Fleet	Active
Type 8101 coastal hydrographic survey ship	?	Various	Not named	Not named	1975-	200 t	All fleets	Active
Type 8105 hydrographic survey ship	FT-14 AIT class	Various	Not named	Not named	1980s	366.82 t	All fleets	Active
Type 8154 hydrographic survey ship	FT-14 AIT class	Various	Not named	Not named	1981-	600 t	All fleets	Active
Type 792 hydrographic survey ship	FT-14 AIT class	Various	Not named	Not named	1990s	600 t	All fleets	Active
Yanjiu-class survey ship	Yanjiu class	Dong-Ce 228	East Survey 228	东测 228	?	? t	East Sea Fleet	Active
Yanjiu-class survey ship	Yanjiu class	Dong-Ce 229	East Survey 229	东测 229	?	? t	East Sea Fleet	Active

=== Tankers ===
List of tankers:

Type	NATO designation	Pennant No.	Name (English)	Name (Han 中文)	Commissioned	Displacement	Fleet	Status
Chinese tanker Hua Chuan	?	Not assigned	Hua-Chuan	华川	March 2013	6300 t	East Sea Fleet	Active
Fubai class transport oil tanker	Fubai class	Dong-You 640	East Oil 640	东油 640	?	? t	East Sea Fleet	Active
Fubai class transport oil tanker	Fubai class	Nan-You 968	South Oil 968	南油 968	?	? t	South Sea Fleet	Active
Fubai class transport oil tanker	Fubai class	Nan-You 971	South Oil 971	南油 971	?	? t	South Sea Fleet	Active
Fubai class transport oil tanker	Fubai class	Nan-You 972	South Oil 972	南油 972	?	? t	South Sea Fleet	Active
Fujian-class transport oil tanker	Fujian class	Bei-You 400	North Oil 400	北油 400	?	? t	North Sea Fleet	Active
Fujian-class transport oil tanker	Fujian class	Bei-You 561	North Oil 561	北油 561	?	? t	North Sea Fleet	Active
Fujian-class transport oil tanker	Fujian class	Bei-You 562	North Oil 562	北油 562	?	? t	North Sea Fleet	Active
Fujian-class transport oil tanker	Fujian class	Bei-You 573	North Oil 573	北油 573	?	? t	North Sea Fleet	Active
Fujian-class transport oil tanker	Fujian class	Dong-You 630	East Oil 630	东油 630	?	? t	East Sea Fleet	Active
Fujian-class transport oil tanker	Fujian class	Dong-You 632	East Oil 632	东油 632	?	? t	East Sea Fleet	Active
Fujian-class transport oil tanker	Fujian class	Dong-You 634	East Oil 634	东油 634	?	? t	East Sea Fleet	Active
Fujian-class transport oil tanker	Fujian class	Dong-You 635	East Oil 635	东油 635	?	? t	East Sea Fleet	Active
Fujian-class transport oil tanker	Fujian class	Dong-You 638	East Oil 638	东油 638	?	? t	East Sea Fleet	Active
Fujian-class transport oil tanker	Fujian class	Dong-You 639	East Oil 639	东油 639	?	? t	East Sea Fleet	Active
Fujian-class transport oil tanker	Fujian class	Dong-You 650	East Oil 650	东油 650	?	? t	East Sea Fleet	Active
Fujian-class transport oil tanker	Fujian class	Nan-You 954	South Oil 954	南油 954	?	? t	South Sea Fleet	Active
Fujian-class transport oil tanker	Fujian class	Nan-You 962	South Oil 962	南油 962	?	? t	South Sea Fleet	Active
Fujian-class transport oil tanker	Fujian class	Nan-You 965	South Oil 965	南油 965	?	? t	South Sea Fleet	Active
Fujian-class transport oil tanker	Fujian class	Nan-You 969	South Oil 969	南油 969	?	? t	South Sea Fleet	Active
Fujian-class transport oil tanker	Fujian class	Nan-You 970	South Oil 970	南油 970	?	? t	South Sea Fleet	Active
Fujian-class water tanker	Fujian class	Bei-Shui 566	North Water 566	北水 566	?	? t	North Sea Fleet	Active
Fujian-class water tanker	Fujian class	Bei-Shui 581	North Water 581	北水 581	?	? t	North Sea Fleet	Active
Fujian-class water tanker	Fujian class	Dong-Shui 650	East Water 650	东水 650	?	? t	East Sea Fleet	Active
Fujian-class water tanker	Fujian class	Nan-Shui 970	South Water 970	南水 970	?	? t	South Sea Fleet	Active
Fushi-class transport oil tanker	Fushi class	Bei-You 576	North Oil 576	北油 576	?	? t	North Sea Fleet	Active
Fushi-class transport oil tanker	Fushi class	Dong-You 633	East Oil 633	东油 633	?	? t	East Sea Fleets	Active
Fushi-class transport oil tanker	Fushi class	Nan-You 958	South Oil 958	南油 958	?	? t	South Sea Fleet	Active
Fushi-class transport oil tanker	Fushi class	Nan-You 963	South Oil 963	南油 963	?	? t	South Sea Fleet	Active
Fushi-class transport oil tanker	Fushi class	Nan-You 976	South Oil 976	南油 976	?	? t	South Sea Fleet	Active
Fushi-class water tanker	Fushi class	Dong-Shui 649	East Water 649	东水 649	?	? t	East Sea Fleet	Active
Fushi-class water tanker	Fushi class	Nan-Shui 964	South Water 964	南水 964	?	? t	South Sea Fleet	Active
Fushi-class water tanker	Fushi class	Nan-Shui 965	South Water 965	南水 965	?	? t	South Sea Fleet	Active
Jinyou-class water tanker	Jinyou class	Nan-Shui 960	South Water 960	南水 960	?	4800 t	South Sea Fleet	Active
Nanshui 701-class water tanker	?	Nan-Shui 701	South Water 701	南水 701	?	? t	East Sea Fleet	Active
Type 620 transport oil tanker	Shengli class	Dong-You 621	East Oil 621	东油 621	1980s	4940 t	East Sea Fleet	Active
Type 631 transport oil tanker	Fuchang class	Bei-You 565	North Oil 565	北油 565	?	? t	North Sea Fleets	Active
Type 631 transport oil tanker	Fuchang class	Dong-You 631	East Oil 631	东油 631	?	? t	East Sea Fleet	Active
Type 631 transport oil tanker	Fuchang class	Dong-You 641	East Oil 641	东油 641	?	? t	East Sea Fleet	Active
Type 631 transport oil tanker	Fuchang class	Nan-You 957	South Oil 957	南油 957	?	? t	South Sea Fleet	Active
Type 631 transport oil tanker	Fuchang class	Nan-You 959	South Oil 959	南油 959	?	? t	South Sea Fleet	Active
Type 631 transport oil tanker	Fuchang class	Nan-You 973	South Oil 973	南油 973	?	? t	South Sea Fleet	Active
Type 637 transport oil tanker	Fuxiao class	Bei-You 567	North Oil 567	北油 567	?	? t	North Sea Fleet	Active
Type 637 transport oil tanker	Fuxiao class	Dong-You 637	East Oil 637	东油 637	?	? t	North Sea Fleet	Active
Type 637 transport oil tanker	Fuxiao class	Various	Various	Various	?	? t	?	Under construction
Type 637 water tanker	Fuxiao class	Various	Various	?	?	? t	?	Under construction
Type 645 water tanker	Guangzhou class	Bei-Shui 590	North Water 590	北水 590	?	900 t	North Sea Fleet	Active
Type 645 water tanker	Guangzhou class	Bei-Shui 593	North Water 593	北水 593	?	900 t	North Sea Fleet	Active
Type 645 water tanker	Guangzhou class	Dong-Shui 645	East Water 645	东水 645	?	900 t	East Sea Fleet	Active

=== Cargo ships ===
List of cargo ships:

Type	NATO designation	Pennant No.	Name (English)	Name (Han 中文)	Commissioned	Displacement	Fleet	Status
500 cubic meter-class barge	?	Bei-Bo 65	North Barge 65	北驳 65	?	? t	North Sea Fleet	Active
500 cubic meter-class barge	?	Bei-Bo 66	North Barge 66	北驳 66	?	? t	North Sea Fleet	Active
500 cubic meter-class barge	?	Bei-Bo 67	North Barge 67	北驳 67	?	? t	North Sea Fleet	Active
500 cubic meter-class barge	?	Bei-Bo 68	North Barge 68	北驳 68	?	? t	North Sea Fleet	Active
500 cubic meter-class barge	?	Nan-Bo 37	South Barge 37	南驳 37	?	? t	South Sea Fleet	Active
500 cubic meter-class barge	?	Nan-Bo 42	South Barge 42	南驳 42	?	? t	South Sea Fleet	Active
500 cubic meter-class barge	?	Nan-Bo 44	South Barge 44	南驳 44	?	? t	South Sea Fleet	Active
Bo Sea Pearl-class roll-on/roll-off ship	Bo Sea Pearl class	Bo-Hai-Cui-Zhu	Bo Sea Emerald Pearl	渤海翠珠	August 8, 2012	36,000 t	North Sea Fleet	Active
Bo Sea Pearl-class roll-on/roll-off ship	Bo Sea Pearl class	Bo-Hai-Jing-Zhu	Bo Sea Crystal Pearl	渤海晶珠	October 10, 2012	36,000 t	North Sea Fleet	Active
Bo Sea Pearl-class roll-on/roll-off ship	Bo Sea Pearl class	Bo-Hai-Zuan-Zhu	Bo Sea Diamond Pearl	渤海钻珠	February 2015	36,000 t	North Sea Fleet	Active
Bo Sea Pearl-class roll-on/roll-off ship	Bo Sea Pearl class	Bo-Hai-Ma-Zhu	Bo Sea Agate Pearl	渤海玛珠	March 2015	36,000 t	North Sea Fleet	Active
Type 711	Modified Hansa Sonderberg class	834	Yinmahu	饮马湖	July 10, 2015	20000 t	South Sea Fleet	Active
Chinese float-on/float-off ship Zhenhua 33	?	Zhen-Hua 33	Revitalize China 33	振华 33	March 14, 2017	50000 t	South Sea Fleet	Active
Chinese roll-on/roll-off ship Chang Da Long	?	Chang-Da-Long	Chang-Da-Long	长达隆	2013	20000 t	North Sea Fleet	Active
Chinese roll-on/roll-off ship China Revival	?	Zhong-Hua-Fu-Xing	China Revival	中华复兴	November 4, 2019	45000 t	North Sea Fleet	Active
Chinese roll-on/roll-off ship Zhong Tie Bo Hai 3	?	Zhong-Tie-Bo Hai 3	China Railway Bo Sea 3	中铁渤海3号	June 18, 2008	25000 t	North Sea Fleet	Active
Converted/Militarized container ships	?	Not assigned	Various	Various	Various	Various	All fleets	Active
Darong-class transport / troopship	Darong class	Nan-Yun 830	South Transport 830	南运 830	2015	5000 t	South Sea Fleet	Active
Darong-class transport / troopship	Darong class	Nan-Yun 831	South Transport 831	南运 831	2015	5000 t	South Sea Fleet	Active
Dongbo 22-class barge	?	Dong-Bo 22	East Barge 22	东驳 22	?	? t	East Sea Fleet	Active
Dongbo 22-class barge	?	Dong-Bo 23	East Barge 23	东驳 23	?	? t	East Sea Fleet	Active
Dongbo 22-class barge	?	Dong-Bo 24	East Barge 24	东驳 24	?	? t	East Sea Fleet	Active
Dongbo 39-class barge (YF)	?	Dong-Bo 39	East Barge 39	东驳 39	?	? t	East Sea Fleet	Active
Dongdao-class reefer ship	Dongdao class	Bei-Leng 599	North Refrigeration 599	北冷 599	Early 1960s	1600 t	North Sea Fleet	Active
Dongleng-class reefer ship	Dongleng class	Dong-Leng 794	East Refrigeration 794	东冷 794	Early 1960s	1290 t	East Sea Fleet	Active
Qiongsha-class cargo ship	Qiongsha class	Nan-Yun 832	South Transport 832	南运 832	1980s	2150 t	South Sea Fleet	Active
Retired landing ships/crafts	Various	Various	Various	Various	?	Various	All fleets	Active

=== Personnel transports ===
Type	NATO designation	Pennant No.	Name (English)	Name (Han 中文)	Commissioned	Displacement	Fleet	Status
Beidiao 990	Kanwu class	Bei-Diao 990	Bei-Diao 990	北调 990	December 2009	380 t	North Sea Fleet	Active
Daguan-class barracks ship / troopship / training ship	Daguan class	88	Xu Xiake	徐霞客	2011	30000 t	North Sea Fleet	Active
Daguan-class barracks ship / troopship / training ship	Daguan class	89	Li Daoyuan	郦道元	2018	30000 t	North Sea Fleet	Active
Darong-class transport / troopship	Darong class	Nan-Yun 830	South Transport 830	南运 830	2015	5,000 t	South Sea Fleet	Active
Darong-class transport / troopship	Darong class	Nan-Yun 831	South Transport 831	南运 831	2015	5,000 t	South Sea Fleet	Active
Duchuan-class dispatch boat	Duchuan class	Bei-Jiao 72	North Traffic 72	北交 72	Duchuan class	? t	South Sea Fleet	Active
Duchuan-class dispatch boat	Duchuan class	Nan-Jiao 83	South Traffic 83	南交 83	Duchuan class	? t	South Sea Fleet	Active
Duchuan-class dispatch boat	Duchuan class	Nan-Jiao 89	South Traffic 89	南交 89	Duchuan class	? t	South Sea Fleet	Active
Duludao-class dispatch boat	Duludao class	Bei-Jiao 74	North Traffic 74	北交 74	?	? t	North Sea Fleet	Active
Duludao-class dispatch boat	Duludao class	Dong-Jiao 92	East Traffic 92	东交 92	?	? t	East Sea Fleet	Active
Duludao-class dispatch boat	Duludao class	Dong-Jiao 93	East Traffic 93	东交 93	?	? t	East Sea Fleet	Active
Duludao-class dispatch boat	Duludao class	Nan-Jiao 92	South Traffic 92	南交 92	?	? t	South Sea Fleet	Active
Dufei-class dispatch boat	Dufei class	Bei-Jiao 88	Bei-Jiao 88	北交 88	?	? t	North Sea Fleet	Active
Dukou-class dispatch boat	Dukou class	Bei-Jiao 90	North Traffic 90	北交90	?	? t	North Sea Fleet	Active
Dukou-class dispatch boat	Dukou class	Dong-Jiao 87	East Traffic 87	东交87	?	? t	East Sea Fleet	Active
Dukou-class dispatch boat	Dukou class	Dong-Jiao 88	East Traffic 88	东交88	?	? t	East Sea Fleet	Active
Dukou-class dispatch boat	Dukou class	Nan-Jiao 85	South Traffic 85	南交85	?	? t	South Sea Fleet	Active
Dukou-class dispatch boat	Dukou class	Nan-Jiao 86	South Traffic 86	南交86	?	? t	South Sea Fleet	Active
Dumuju-class dispatch boat	Dumuju class	Bei-Jiao 77	Bei-Jiao 77	北交 77	?	? t	North Sea Fleet	Active
Dusso-class dispatch boat	Dusso class	Dong-Jiao 65	East Traffic 65	东交 65	?	? t	East Sea Fleet	Active
Duzhou-class dispatch boat	Duzhou class	Dong-Jiao 82	East Traffic 82	东交 82	?	? t	East Sea Fleet	Active
Qiongsha-class troopship	Qiongsha class	Nan-Yun 834	South Transport 834	南运 834	1980s	2150 t	South Sea Fleet	Active
Qiongsha-class troopship	Qiongsha class	Nan-Yun 835	South Transport 835	南运 835	1980s	2150 t	South Sea Fleet	Active
Type 081 transport ship	?	Bei-Yun 443	North Transport 443	北运 443	Early 1970s	1950 t	North Sea Fleet	Active
Type 081 transport ship	?	Bei-Yun 528	North Transport 528	北运 528	Early 1970s	1950 t	North Sea Fleet	Active
Type 081 transport ship	?	Dong-Yun 577	East Transport 577	东运 577	Early 1970s	1950 t	East Sea Fleet	Active
Type 081 transport ship	?	Dong-Yun 765	East Transport 756	东运 756	Early 1970s	1950 t	East Sea Fleet	Active
Type 081 transport ship	?	Dong-Yun 771	East Transport 771	东运 771	Early 1970s	1950 t	East Sea Fleet	Active
Type 081 transport ship	?	Nan-Yun 836	South Transport 836	南运 836	Early 1970s	1950 t	South Sea Fleet	Active
Type 805 dispatch boat	?	Several	Not named	Not named	1971-1980	52 t	All fleets	Being retired

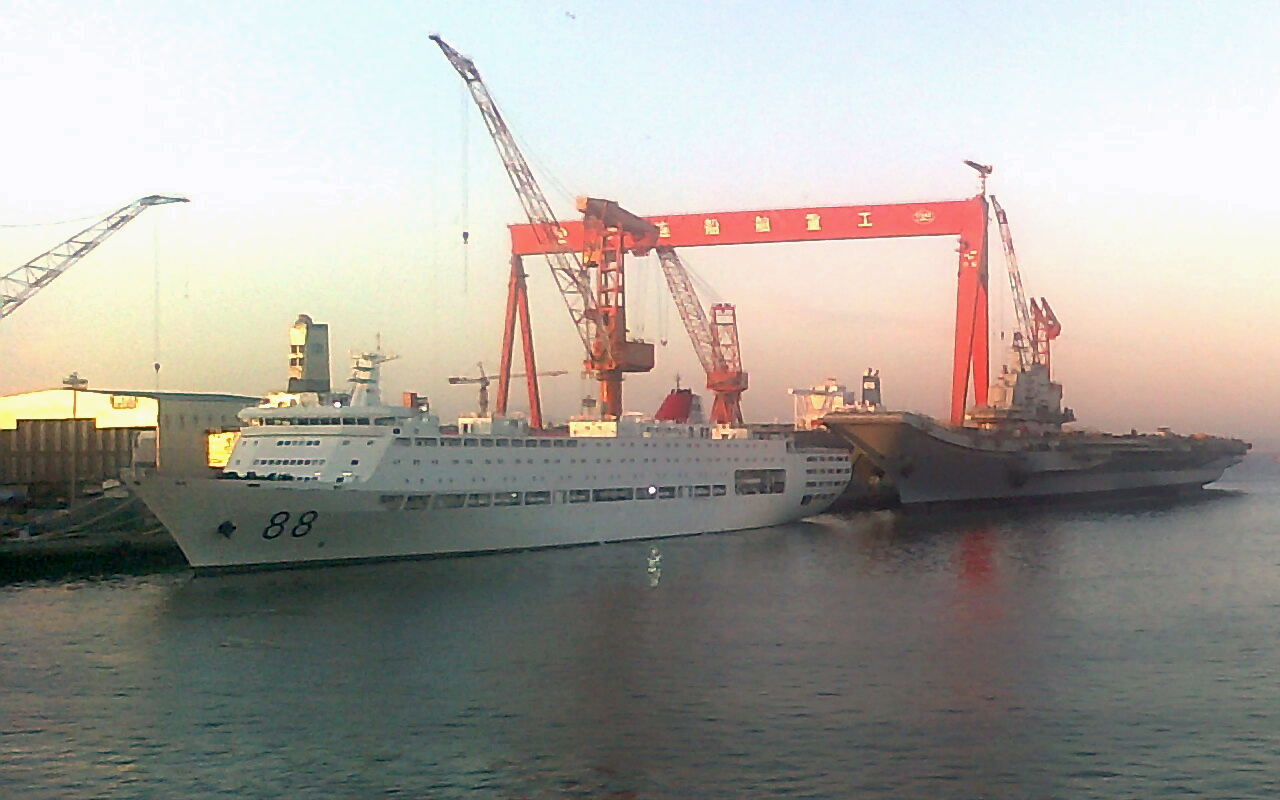
Go ahead No. 1 (Xu Xiake class) & Type 001 Liaoning

=== Buoy tenders ===
List of buoy tenders:

Type	NATO designation	Pennant No.	Name (English)	Name (Han 中文)	Commissioned	Displacement	Fleet	Status
Type 066	Yuch'in class	Various	Not named	Not named	1980s-	70 t	All fleets	Active
Type 911I	Yunan/Yunnan class	Various	Not named	Not named	1980s-	128 t	All fleets	Active
Type 999	?	Various	Not named	Not named	Early 1970s	95 t	All fleets	Active
Type 999G	?	Various	Not named	Not named	Mid 1970s	98 t	All fleets	Active
Type 999HG	?	Various	Not named	Not named	late 1970s	98 t	All fleets	Active
Type 744A buoy tender	Yannan class	Nan-Biao 463	South Buoy 463	南标 463	Dec 14, 1980	2,000 t	South Sea Fleet	Active
Type 744A buoy tender	Yannan class	Bei-Biao 982	North Buoy 982	北标 982	Mar 1981	2,000 t	North Sea Fleet	Active
Type 744A buoy tender	Yannan class	Bei-Biao 983	North Buoy 983	北标 983	May 1981	2,000 t	North Sea Fleet	Active
Type 944A buoy tender	Yanni class	Dong-Biao 265	East Buoy 265	东标 265	Jan 23, 2017	2,300 t	East Sea Fleet	Active
Type 944A buoy tender	Yanni class	Nan-Biao 467	South Buoy 467	南标 467	Jun 2017	2,300 t	South Sea Fleet	Active
Type 944A buoy tender	Yanni class	Bei-Biao 989	North-Buoy 989	北标 989	Sept 4, 2018	2,300 t	North Sea Fleet	Active

=== Cable layers ===
List of cable layers:

Type	NATO designation	Pennant No.	Name (English)	Name (Han 中文)	Commissioned	Displacement	Fleet	Status
Dulaji-class cable layer	Dulaji class	Bei-Lan 768	North Cable 768	北缆 768	?	300 t	North Sea Fleet	Active
Dulaji-class cable layer	Dulaji class	Bei-Lan 769	North Cable 769	北缆 769	?	300 t	North Sea Fleet	Active
Dulaji-class cable layer	Dulaji class	Dong-Lan 884	East Cable 884	东缆 884	?	300 t	East Sea Fleet	Active
Dulaji-class cable layer	Dulaji class	Dong-Lan 885	East Cable 885	东缆 885	?	300 t	East Sea Fleet	Active
Dulaji-class cable layer	Dulaji class	Nan-Lan 235	South Cable 235	南缆 235	?	300 t	South Sea Fleet	Active
Type 911II cable layer	Yunan/Yunnan class	Various	Not named	Not named	1980s-	128 t	All fleets	Active
Type 991 cable layer	Youdian class	Bei-Lan 764	North Cable 764	北缆 764	1975 – mid 1980s	1327 t	North Sea Fleet	Active
Type 991 cable layer	Youdian class	Bei-Lan 765	North Cable 765	北缆 765	1975 – mid 1980s	1327 t	North Sea Fleet	Active
Type 991 cable layer	Youdian class	Dong-Lan 868	East Cable 868	东缆 868	1975 – mid 1980s	1327 t	East Sea Fleet	Active
Type 991 cable layer	Youdian class	Dong-Lan 873	East Cable 873	东缆 873	1975 – mid 1980s	1327 t	East Sea Fleet	Active
Type 991 cable layer	Youdian class	Dong-Lan 874	East Cable 874	东缆 874	1975 – mid 1980s	1327 t	East Sea Fleet	Active
Type 991 cable layer	Youdian class	Dong-Lan 882	East Cable 882	东缆 882	1975 – mid 1980s	1327 t	East Sea Fleet	Active
Type 991 cable layer	Youdian class	Nan-Lan 234	South Cable 234	南缆 234	1975 – mid 1980s	1327 t	South Sea Fleet	Active
Youlan-class cable layer	Youlan class	Dong-Lan 885	East Cable 885	东缆 739	January 30, 2015	5000 t	East Sea Fleet	Active
Youlan-class cable layer	Youlan class	Nan-Lan 233	South Cable 233	南缆 233	2017	5000 t	South Sea Fleet	Active

=== Crane ships ===
List of crane ships:

Type	NATO designation	Pennant No.	Name (English)	Name (Han 中文)	Commissioned	Displacement	Fleet	Status
Beiqi 346-class crane ship	?	Bei-Qi 346	North Lift 346	北起 346	?	? t	North Sea Fleet	Active
Beiqi 346-class crane ship	?	Dong-Qi 423	East Lift 423	东起 423	?	? t	East Sea Fleet	Active
Beiqi 346-class crane ship	?	Dong-Qi 428	East Lift 428	东起 428	?	? t	East Sea Fleet	Active
Beiqi 346-class crane ship	?	Nan-Qi 745	South Lift 745	南起 745	?	? t	South Sea Fleet	Active
Beiqi 384-class crane ship	?	Bei-Qi 384	North Lift 384	北起 384	?	? t	North Sea Fleet	Active
Crane ship of unidentified type/class	?	Nan-Qi 746	South Lift 746	南起 746	?	? t	South Sea Fleet	Active

=== Degaussing/deperming ships ===
List of degaussing and deperming ships:

Type	NATO designation	Pennant No.	Name (English)	Name (Han 中文)	Commissioned	Displacement	Fleet	Status
Type 911	Dazar class	Dong-Qin 870	East Logistics 870	东勤 870	2009	? t	East Sea Fleet	Active
Type 911	Dazar class	Nan-Qin 207	South Logisitics 207	南勤 207	2017	? t	South Sea Fleet	Active
Type 912IIIAH	Yanci class	Bei-Qin 736	North Logistics 736	北勤 736	1988 onward	848 t	North Sea Fleet	Active
Type 912IIIAH	Yanci class	Dong-Qin 864	East Logistics 864	东勤 864	1988 onward	848 t	East Sea Fleet	Active
Type 912IIIAH	Yanci class	Nan-Qin 203	South Logistics 203	南勤 203	January 15, 1998	848 t	South Sea Fleet	Active
Type 912IIIAH	Yanci class	Nan-Qin 205	South Logistics 205	南勤 205	1988 onward	848 t	South Sea Fleet	Active
Type 912IIIA	Yanbai class	Dong-Qin 860	East Logistics 860	东勤 860	1988 onward	746 t	East Sea Fleet	Active
Type 912IIIA	Yanbai class	Dong-Qin 863	East Logistics 863	东勤 863	1988 onward	746 t	East Sea Fleet	Active
Type 912III	Yanbai class	Bei-Qin 735	North Logistics 735	北勤 735	December 1973	746 t	North Sea Fleet	Active
Type 912I	Yanbai class	Nan-Qin 202	South Logistics 202	南勤 202	December 1972	570 t	South Sea Fleet	Active
Type 912	Yanbai class	Bei-Qin 731	North Logistics 731	北勤 731	March 1970	570 t	North Sea Fleet	Active

=== Dredgers ===
List of dredgers:

Type	NATO designation	Pennant No.	Name (English)	Name (Han 中文)	Commissioned	Displacement	Fleet	Status
8 cubic meter-class dredger	?	Jiao-Zhua 110	Jiao-Zhua 110	交抓 110	July 1987	? t	East Sea Fleet	Active
Beijun 204-class dredger	?	Bei-Jun 204	North Deepen 204	北浚 204	?	? t	North Sea Fleet	Active
Beijun 204-class dredger	?	Bei-Jun 272	North Deepen 272	北浚 272	?	? t	North Sea Fleet	Active
Beijun 204-class dredger	?	Nan-Jun 609	South Deepen 609	南浚 609	?	? t	South Sea Fleet	Active
Dongjun 417-class dredger	?	Dong-Jun 417	East Deepen 417	东浚 417	?	? t	East Sea Fleet	Active
Dongjun 433-class dredger	?	Dong-Jun 433	East Deepen 433	东浚 433	?	? t	East Sea Fleet	Active
Dongjun 434-class dredger	?	Dong-Jun 434	East Deepen 434	东浚 434	?	? t	East Sea Fleet	Active
Dredger of unidentified type/class	?	Bei-Jun 271	North Deepen 746	北浚 271	?	? t	North Sea Fleet	Active
Dredger of unidentified type/class	?	Bei-Jun 273	North Deepen 273	北浚 273	?	? t	North Sea Fleet	Active
Dredger of unidentified type/class	?	Bei-Jun 274	North Deepen 274	北浚 274	?	? t	North Sea Fleet	Active
Dredger of unidentified type/class	?	Bei-Jun 277	North Deepen 277	北浚 277	?	? t	North Sea Fleet	Active
Dredger of unidentified type/class	?	Bei-Jun 278	North Deepen 278	北浚 278	?	? t	North Sea Fleet	Active
Nanjun 610-class dredger	?	Nan-Jun 610	South Deepen 610	南浚 610	?	? t	South Sea Fleet	Active
Nanjun 610-class dredger	?	Nan-Jun 611	South Deepen 611	南浚 611	?	? t	South Sea Fleet	Active

=== Floating pile drivers ===
List of floating pile drivers:

Type	NATO designation	Pennant No.	Name (English)	Name (Han 中文)	Commissioned	Displacement	Fleet	Status
36 meter-class floating pile driver	?	Dong-Gong 410	East Engineering 410	东工 410	?	? t	East Sea Fleet	Active
36 meter-class floating pile driver	?	Dong-Gong 427	East Engineering 427	东工 427	?	? t	East Sea Fleet	Active
Donggong 429-class floating pile driver	?	Dong-Gong 429	East Engineering 429	东工 429	?	? t	East Sea Fleet	Active
Nangong 681-class floating pile driver	?	Nan-Gong 681	South Engineering 681	南工 681	?	? t	South Sea Fleet	Active

=== Range support & target ships ===
List of target ships:

Type	NATO designation	Pennant No.	Name (English)	Name (Han 中文)	Commissioned	Displacement	Fleet	Status
Dachou-class torpedo retriever / range support / target ship	Dachou class	Bei-Yun 530	North Transport 530	北运 530	Since early 2010s	? t	North Sea Fleet	Active
Dachou-class torpedo retriever / range support / target ship	Dachou class	Dong-Yun 760	East Transport 760	东运 760	Since early 2010s	? t	East Sea Fleet	Active
Dachou-class torpedo retriever / range support / target ship	Dachou class	Nan-Yun 846	South Transport 846	南运 846	Since early 2010s	? t	South Sea Fleet	Active
Dachou-class torpedo retriever / range support / target ship	Dachou class	Nan-Yun 847	South Transport 847	南运 847	Since early 2010s	? t	South Sea Fleet	Active
Dubei-class research ship / target ship	Dubei class	Shi-Yan 216	Experiment 216	试验 216	2015	? t	?	Active
Dubei-class research ship / target ship	Dubei class	Dong-Ba 01	East Target 01	东靶 01	2015 onward	? t	East Sea Fleet	Active
Dubei-class research ship / target ship	Dubei class	Nan-Ba 11	South Target 11	南靶 11	2015 onward	? t	South Sea Fleet	Active
Dubei-class research ship / target ship	Dubei class	Various	Various	Various	2015 onward	? t	?	Under construction
Type 811 target ship	?	Several	Not named	Not named	1975 onward	66 t	All fleets	Being retired
Type 917 torpedo retriever / range support / target ship	Damen class	Bei-Yun 455	North Transport 455	北运 455	1990s-2007	720 t	North Sea Fleet	Active
Type 917 torpedo retriever / range support / target ship	Damen class	Bei-Yun 484	North Transport 484	北运 484	1990s-2007	720 t	North Sea Fleet	Active
Type 917 torpedo retriever / range support / target ship	Damen class	Bei-Yun 485	North Transport 485	北运 485	1990s-2007	720 t	North Sea Fleet	Active
Type 917 torpedo retriever / range support / target ship	Damen class	Bei-Yun 529	North Transport 529	北运 529	1990s-2007	720 t	North Sea Fleet	Active
Type 917 torpedo retriever / range support / target ship	Damen class	Dong-Yun 758	East Transport 758	东运 758	1990s-2007	720 t	East Sea Fleet	Active
Type 917 torpedo retriever / range support / target ship	Damen class	Dong-Yun 803	East Transport 803	东运 803	1990s-2007	720 t	East Sea Fleet	Active
Type 917 torpedo retriever / range support / target ship	Damen class	Nan-Yun 841	South Transport 841	南运 841	1990s-2007	720 t	South Sea Fleet	Active
Type 917 torpedo retriever / range support / target ship	Damen class	Nan-Yun 844	South Transport 844	南运 844	1990s-2007	720 t	South Sea Fleet	Active
Type 917 torpedo retriever / range support / target ship	Damen class	Nan-Yun 854	South Transport 854	南运 854	1990s-2007	720 t	South Sea Fleet	Active
Decommissioned ships	Various	Various	Various	Various	ongoing	? t	All fleets	Active

=== Torpedo trials crafts ===
List of Torpedo trials crafts:

Type	NATO designation	Pennant No.	Name (English)	Name (Han 中文)	Commissioned	Displacement	Fleet	Status
Dachou-class range support / target ship / torpedo retriever	Dachou class	Bei-Yun 530	North Transport 530	北运 530	Since early 2010s	? t	North Sea Fleet	Active
Dachou-class range support / target ship / torpedo retriever	Dachou class	Dong-Yun 760	East Transport 760	东运 760	Since early 2010s	? t	East Sea Fleet	Active
Dachou-class range support / target ship / torpedo retriever	Dachou class	Nan-Yun 846	South Transport 846	南运 846	Since early 2010s	? t	South Sea Fleet	Active
Dachou-class range support / target ship / torpedo retriever	Dachou class	Nan-Yun 847	South Transport 847	南运 847	Since early 2010s	? t	South Sea Fleet	Active
Type 803 torpedo retriever	?	Various	Various	Various	1977	97 t	All fleets	Active
Type 906 research ship / torpedo trials craft	Xiang Yang Hong 9 class	Kan-Cha 3	Survey No. 3	勘查三号	January 1987	2300 t	All fleets	Active
Type 907A torpedo trials craft	?	Kan-Cha 4	Survey No. 4	勘查四号	February 1987	615 t	All fleets	Active
Type 917 range support / target ship / torpedo retriever	Damen class	Bei-Yun 455	North Transport 455	北运 455	1990s-2007	720 t	North Sea Fleet	Active
Type 917 range support / target ship / torpedo retriever	Damen class	Bei-Yun 484	North Transport 484	北运 484	1990s-2007	720 t	North Sea Fleet	Active
Type 917 range support / target ship / torpedo retriever	Damen class	Bei-Yun 485	North Transport 485	北运 485	1990s-2007	720 t	North Sea Fleet	Active
Type 917 range support / target ship / torpedo retriever	Damen class	Bei-Yun 529	North Transport 529	北运 529	1990s-2007	720 t	North Sea Fleet	Active
Type 917 range support / target ship / torpedo retriever	Damen class	Dong-Yun 758	East Transport 758	东运 758	1990s-2007	720 t	East Sea Fleet	Active
Type 917 range support / target ship / torpedo retriever	Damen class	Dong-Yun 803	East Transport 803	东运 803	1990s-2007	720 t	East Sea Fleet	Active
Type 917 range support / target ship / torpedo retriever	Damen class	Nan-Yun 841	South Transport 841	南运 841	1990s-2007	720 t	South Sea Fleet	Active
Type 917 range support / target ship / torpedo retriever	Damen class	Nan-Yun 844	South Transport 844	南运 844	1990s-2007	720 t	South Sea Fleet	Active
Type 917 range support / target ship / torpedo retriever	Damen class	Nan-Yun 854	South Transport 854	南运 854	1990s-2007	720 t	South Sea Fleet	Active

=== Tugboat ===
List of tugboats:

Type	NATO designation	Pennant No.	Name (English)	Name (Han 中文)	Commissioned	Displacement	Fleet	Status
Beituo 617-class harbor tug	?	Bei-Tuo 617	North Tug 617	北拖 617	?	? t	North Sea Fleet	Active
Beituo 617-class harbor tug	?	Bei-Tuo 655	North Tug 655	北拖 655	?	? t	North Sea Fleet	Active
Beituo 699-class harbor tug	?	Bei-Tuo 699	North Tug 699	北拖 699	?	? t	North Sea Fleet	Active
Beituo 702-class harbor tug	?	Bei-Tuo 702	North Tug 702	北拖 702	?	? t	North Sea Fleet	Active
Beituo 715-class harbor tug	?	Bei-Tuo 715	North Tug 715	北拖 715	?	? t	North Sea Fleet	Active
Beituo 715-class harbor tug	?	Dong-Tuo 838	East Tug 838	东拖 838	?	? t	East Sea Fleet	Active
Beituo 715-class harbor tug	?	Dong-Tuo 846	East Tug 846	东拖 846	?	? t	East Sea Fleet	Active
Beituo 715-class harbor tug	?	Dong-Tuo 859	East Tug 859	东拖 859	?	? t	East Sea Fleet	Active
Beituo 715-class harbor tug	?	Nan-Tuo 146	South Tug 146	南拖 146	?	? t	South Sea Fleet	Active
Beituo 715-class harbor tug	?	Nan-Tuo 401	South Tug 401	南拖 401	?	? t	South Sea Fleet	Active
Bei-Tuo 739 rescue tug	?	Bei-Tuo 739	North Tug 739	北拖 739	2016	6000 t	North Sea Fleet	Active
Bei-Tuo 739 rescue tug	?	Bei-Tuo 743	North Tug 743	北拖 743	2018/2019	6000 t	North Sea Fleet	Active
Bei-Tuo 739 rescue tug	?	Dong-Tuo 861	East Tug 861	东拖 861	2018/2019	6000 t	East Sea Fleet	Active
Bei-Tuo 739 rescue tug	?	Dong-Tuo 863	East Tug 863	东拖 863	2019	6000 t	East Sea Fleet	Active
Bei-Tuo 739 rescue tug	?	Nan-Tuo 171	South Tug 171	南拖 171	2018/2019	6000 t	South Sea Fleet	Active
Bei-Tuo 739 rescue tug	?	Nan-Tuo 195	South Tug 195	南拖 195	January 2018	6000 t	South Sea Fleet	Active
Daozha-class rescue tug	Daozha class	Dong-Tuo 890	East Tug 890	东拖 890	1993	4000 t	East Sea Fleet	Active
Datuo-class rescue ship / rescue tug	Datuo class	Bei-Tuo 742	North Tug 742	北拖 742	?	? t	North Sea Fleet	Active
Datuo-class rescue ship / rescue tug	Datuo class	Nan-Tuo 159	South Tug 159	南拖 159	?	? t	South Sea Fleet	Active
Datuo-class rescue ship / rescue tug	Datuo class	Nan-Tuo 194	South Tug 194	南拖 194	?	? t	South Sea Fleet	Active
Datuo-class rescue ship / rescue tug	Datuo class	Nan-Tuo 196	South Tug 196	南拖 196	?	? t	South Sea Fleet	Active
Datuo-class rescue ship / rescue tug	Datuo class	Various	Various	Various	?	? t	?	Under construction
Dong-Tuo 835-class rescue tug	?	Dong-Tuo 835	East Tug 835	东拖 835	2017	? t	East Sea Fleet	Active
Dong-Tuo 835-class rescue tug	?	?	?	?	After 2017	? t	?	Active
Ducha-class large harbor tug	Ducha class	Bei-Tuo 624	North Tug 624	北拖 624	?	? t	North Sea Fleet	Active
Ducha-class large harbor tug	Ducha class	Bei-Tuo 625	North Tug 625	北拖 625	?	? t	North Sea Fleet	Active
Ducha-class large harbor tug	Ducha class	Bei-Tuo 626	North Tug 626	北拖 626	?	? t	North Sea Fleet	Active
Ducha-class large harbor tug	Ducha class	Bei-Tuo 627	North Tug 627	北拖 627	?	? t	North Sea Fleet	Active
Ducha-class large harbor tug	Ducha class	Bei-Tuo 629	North Tug 629	北拖 629	?	? t	North Sea Fleet	Active
Ducha-class large harbor tug	Ducha class	Bei-Tuo 718	North Tug 718	北拖 718	?	? t	North Sea Fleet	Active
Ducha-class large harbor tug	Ducha class	Dong-Tuo 871	East Tug 871	东拖 871	?	? t	East Sea Fleet	Active
Ducha-class large harbor tug	Ducha class	Dong-Tuo 872	East Tug 872	东拖 872	?	? t	East Sea Fleet	Active
Ducha-class large harbor tug	Ducha class	Dong-Tuo 873	East Tug 873	东拖 873	?	? t	East Sea Fleet	Active
Ducha-class large harbor tug	Ducha class	Nan-Tuo 169	South Tug 169	南拖 169	?	? t	South Sea Fleet	Active
Ducha-class large harbor tug	Ducha class	Nan-Tuo 170	South Tug 170	南拖 170	?	? t	South Sea Fleet	Active
Ducha-class large harbor tug	Ducha class	Nan-Tuo 173	South Tug 173	南拖 173	?	? t	South Sea Fleet	Active
Ducha-class large harbor tug	Ducha class	Nan-Tuo 178	South Tug 178	南拖 178	?	? t	South Sea Fleet	Active
Ducha-class large harbor tug	Ducha class	Nan-Tuo 179	South Tug 179	南拖 179	?	? t	South Sea Fleet	Active
Duda-class large harbor tug	Duda class	Bei-Tuo 632	North Tug 632	北拖 632	?	? t	North Sea Fleet	Active
Duda-class large harbor tug	Duda class	Bei-Tuo 681	North Tug 681	北拖 681	?	? t	North Sea Fleet	Active
Duda-class large harbor tug	Duda class	Bei-Tuo 685	North Tug 685	北拖 685	?	? t	North Sea Fleet	Active
Duda-class large harbor tug	Duda class	Bei-Tuo 769	North Tug 769	北拖 769	?	? t	North Sea Fleet	Active
Duda-class large harbor tug	Duda class	Dong-Tuo 874	East Tug 874	东拖 874	?	? t	East Sea Fleet	Active
Duda-class large harbor tug	Duda class	Dong-Tuo 876	East Tug 876	东拖 876	?	? t	East Sea Fleet	Active
Duda-class large harbor tug	Duda class	Dong-Tuo 878	East Tug 878	东拖 878	?	? t	East Sea Fleet	Active
Duda-class large harbor tug	Duda class	Dong-Tuo 879	East Tug 879	东拖 879	?	? t	East Sea Fleet	Active
Duda-class large harbor tug	Duda class	Nan-Tuo 172	South Tug 172	南拖 172	?	? t	South Sea Fleet	Active
Duda-class large harbor tug	Duda class	Nan-Tuo 176	South Tug 176	南拖 176	?	? t	South Sea Fleet	Active
Duda-class large harbor tug	Duda class	Nan-Tuo 177	South Tug 177	南拖 177	?	? t	South Sea Fleet	Active
Duhast-class large harbor tug	Duhast class	Bei-Tuo 633	North Tug 633	北拖 633	2004 onward	2300 t	North Sea Fleet	Active
Duhast-class large harbor tug	Duhast class	Bei-Tuo 719	Bei-Tuo 719	北拖 719	2004 onward	2300 t	North Sea Fleet	Active
Duhast-class large harbor tug	Duhast class	Bei-Tuo 720	North Tug 720	北拖 720	2004 onward	2300 t	North Sea Fleet	Active
Duhast-class large harbor tug	Duhast class	Bei-Tuo 725	North Tug 725	北拖 725	2004 onward	2300 t	North Sea Fleet	Active
Duhast-class large harbor tug	Duhast class	Bei-Tuo 733	North Tug 733	北拖 733	2004 onward	2300 t	North Sea Fleet	Active
Duhast-class large harbor tug	Duhast class	Dong-Tuo 832	East Tug 832	东拖 832	2004 onward	2300 t	East Sea Fleet	Active
Duhast-class large harbor tug	Duhast class	Dong-Tuo 876	East Tug 876	东拖 876	2004 onward	2300 t	East Sea Fleet	Active
Duhast-class large harbor tug	Duhast class	Dong-Tuo 880	East Tug 880	东拖 880	2004 onward	2300 t	East Sea Fleet	Active
Duhast-class large harbor tug	Duhast class	Nan-Tuo 180	South Tug 180	南拖 180	2004 onward	2300 t	South Sea Fleet	Active
Duhast-class large harbor tug	Duhast class	Nan-Tuo 182	South Tug 182	南拖 182	2004 onward	2300 t	South Sea Fleet	Active
Duhast-class large harbor tug	Duhast class	Nan-Tuo 183	South Tug 183	南拖 183	2004 onward	2300 t	South Sea Fleet	Active
Duhast-class large harbor tug	Duhast class	Nan-Tuo 186	South Tug 186	南拖 186	2004 onward	2300 t	South Sea Fleet	Active
Duhast-class large harbor tug	Duhast class	Nan-Tuo 187	South Tug 187	南拖 187	2004 onward	2300 t	South Sea Fleet	Active
Dujiang-class medium harbor tug	Dujiang class	Bei-Tuo 644	North Tug 644	北拖 644	?	? t	North Sea Fleet	Active
Dujiang-class medium harbor tug	Dujiang class	Bei-Tuo 648	North Tug 648	北拖 648	?	? t	North Sea Fleet	Active
Dujiang-class medium harbor tug	Dujiang class	Bei-Tuo 659	North Tug 659	北拖 659	?	? t	North Sea Fleet	Active
Dujiang-class medium harbor tug	Dujiang class	Dong-Tuo 841	East Tug 841	东拖 841	?	? t	East Sea Fleet	Active
Dujiang-class medium harbor tug	Dujiang class	Dong-Tuo 848	East Tug 848	东拖 848	?	? t	East Sea Fleet	Active
Dujiang-class medium harbor tug	Dujiang class	Various	Various	Various	?	? t	?	All fleets
Dunado-class medium harbor tug	Dunado class	Bei-Tuo 686	North Tug 686	北拖 686	?	? t	North Sea Fleet	Active
Dupo-class large harbor tug	Dupo class	Nan-Tuo 192	South Tug 192	南拖 192	?	? t	South Sea Fleet	Active
Dupo-class large harbor tug	Dupo class	Various (10+)	Various	Various	?	? t	?	In service & under construction
Haixiu 121-class repair tug	?	Hai-Xiu 121	Hai-Xiu 121	海修121	?	? t	?	Active
Tuqiang-class sea-ging tug	?	Nan-Tuo 181	South Tug 181	南拖 181	?	? t	South Sea Fleet	Active
Tuqiang-class sea-ging tug	?	Nan-Tuo 189	South Tug 189	南拖 189	?	? t	South Sea Fleet	Active
Tuqiang-class sea-ging tug	?	Bei-Tuo 721	North Tug 721	北拖 721	?	? t	North Sea Fleet	Active
Type 802 sea-going tug	Gromovoy class	Dong-Tuo 802	East Tug 802	东拖 802	Early 1960s	795 t	East Sea Fleet	Active
Type 802 sea-going tug	Gromovoy class	Dong-Tuo 811	East Tug 811	东拖 811	Early 1960s	795 t	East Sea Fleet	Active
Type 802 sea-going tug	Gromovoy class	Dong-Tuo 824	East Tug 824	东拖 824	Early 1960s	795 t	East Sea Fleet	Active
Type 802 sea-going tug	Gromovoy class	Dong-Tuo 827	East Tug 827	东拖 827	Early 1960s	795 t	East Sea Fleet	Active
Type 802 sea-going tug	Gromovoy class	Nan-Tuo 167	South Tug 167	南拖 167	Early 1960s	795 t	South Sea Fleet	Active
Type 830 range instrumentation ship / rescue tug	Tuozhong class	Dong-Tuo 830	East Tug 830	东拖 830	December 1977	4000 t	East Sea Fleet	Active
Type 830 range instrumentation ship / rescue tug	Tuozhong class	Nan-Tuo 154	South Tug 154	南拖 154	September 1979	4000 t	South Sea Fleet	Active
Type 837 sea-going tug	Hujiu class	Bei-Tuo 622	North Tug 622	北拖 622	1980s	1470 t	North Sea Fleet	Active
Type 837 sea-going tug	Hujiu class	Bei-Tuo 635	North Tug 635	北拖 635	1980s	1470 t	North Sea Fleet	Active
Type 837 sea-going tug	Hujiu class	Bei-Tuo 711	North Tug 711	北拖 711	1980s	1470 t	North Sea Fleet	Active
Type 837 sea-going tug	Hujiu class	Bei-Tuo 712	North Tug 712	北拖 712	1980s	1470 t	North Sea Fleet	Active
Type 837 sea-going tug	Hujiu class	Bei-Tuo 717	North Tug 717	北拖 717	1980s	1470 t	North Sea Fleet	Active
Type 837 sea-going tug	Hujiu class	Dong-Tuo 836	East Tug 836	东拖 836	1980s	1470 t	East Sea Fleet	Active
Type 837 sea-going tug	Hujiu class	Dong-Tuo 837	East Tug 837	东拖 837	1980s	1470 t	East Sea Fleet	Active
Type 837 sea-going tug	Hujiu class	Dong-Tuo 842	East Tug 842	东拖 842	1980s	1470 t	East Sea Fleet	Active
Type 837 sea-going tug	Hujiu class	Dong -Tuo 843	East Tug 843	东拖 843	1980s	1470 t	East Sea Fleet	Active
Type 837 sea-going tug	Hujiu class	Dong-Tuo 875	East Tug 875	东拖 875	1980s	1470 t	East Sea Fleet	Active
Type 837 sea-going tug	Hujiu class	Dong-Tuo 877	East Tug 877	东拖 877	1980s	1470 t	East Sea Fleet	Active
Type 837 sea-going tug	Hujiu class	Nan-Tuo 147	South Tug 147	南拖 147	1980s	1470 t	South Sea Fleet	Active
Type 837 sea-going tug	Hujiu class	Nan-Tuo 155	South Tug 155	南拖 155	1980s	1470 t	South Sea Fleet	Active
Type 837 sea-going tug	Hujiu class	Nan-Tuo 156	South Tug 156	南拖 156	1980s	1470 t	South Sea Fleet	Active
Type 837 sea-going tug	Hujiu class	Nan-Tuo 164	South Tug 164	南拖 164	1980s	1470 t	South Sea Fleet	Active
Type 837 sea-going tug	Hujiu class	Nan-Tuo 174	South Tug 174	南拖 174	1980s	1470 t	South Sea Fleet	Active
Type 837 sea-going tug	Hujiu class	Nan-Tuo 175	South Tug 175	南拖 175	1980s	1470 t	South Sea Fleet	Active
Type 837 sea-going tug	Hujiu class	Nan-Tuo 185	South Tug 185	南拖 185	1980s	1470 t	South Sea Fleet	Active
Type 852 sea-going tug	Roslavl class	Bei-Tuo 618	North Tug 618	北拖 618			North Sea Fleet	Active
Type 852 sea-going tug	Roslavl class	Bei-Tuo 630	North Tug 630	北拖 630			North Sea Fleet	Active
Type 852 sea-going tug	Roslavl class	Bei-Tuo 631	North Tug 631	北拖 631			North Sea Fleet	Active
Type 852 sea-going tug	Roslavl class	Bei-Tuo 704	Bei-Tuo 704	北拖 704			North Sea Fleet	Active
Type 852 sea-going tug	Roslavl class	Bei-Tuo 716	North Tug 716	北拖 716			North Sea Fleet	Active
Type 852 sea-going tug	Roslavl class	Dong-Tuo 852	East Tug 852	东拖 852			East Sea Fleet	Active
Type 852 sea-going tug	Roslavl class	Dong-Tuo 853	East Tug 853	东拖 853			East Sea Fleet	Active
Type 852 sea-going tug	Roslavl class	Dong-Tuo 854	East Tug 854	东拖 854			East Sea Fleet	Active
Type 852 sea-going tug	Roslavl class	Dong-Tuo 862	East Tug 862	东拖 862			East Sea Fleet	Active
Type 852 sea-going tug	Roslavl class	Dong-Tuo 863	East Tug 863	东拖 863			East Sea Fleet	Active
Type 852 sea-going tug	Roslavl class	Dong-Tuo 867	East Tug 867	东拖 867			East Sea Fleet	Active
Type 852 sea-going tug	Roslavl class	Nan-Tuo 161	South Tug 161	南拖 167			South Sea Fleet	Active
Type 852 sea-going tug	Roslavl class	Nan-Tuo 161	South Tug 161	南拖 168			South Sea Fleet	Active
Tugs of unidentified type/class	?	Bei-Tuo 153	North Tug 630	北拖 630			North Sea Fleet	Active
Tugs of unidentified type/class	?	Bei-Tuo 651	North Tug 651	北拖 651			North Sea Fleet	Active
Tugs of unidentified type/class	?	Bei-Tuo 704	North Tug 704	北拖 704			North Sea Fleet	Active
Tugs of unidentified type/class	?	Bei-Tuo 728	North Tug 728	北拖 728			North Sea Fleet	Active
Tugs of unidentified type/class	?	Dong-Tuo 845	East Tug 845	东拖 845			East Sea Fleet	Active
Tugs of unidentified type/class	?	Dong-Tuo 861	East Tug 861	东拖 861			East Sea Fleet	Active
Tugs of unidentified type/class	?	Nan-Tuo 142	South Tug 142	南拖 142			South Sea Fleet	Active
Tugs of unidentified type/class	?	Nan-Tuo 162	South Tug 162	南拖 162			South Sea Fleet	Active
Tugs of unidentified type/class	?	Nan-Tuo 163	South Tug 163	南拖 163			South Sea Fleet	Active
Tugs of unidentified type/class	?	Nan-Tuo 168	South Tug 168	南拖 168			South Sea Fleet	Active
Tugs of unidentified type/class	?	Nan-Tuo 176	South Tug 176	南拖 176			South Sea Fleet	Active
Tugs of unidentified type/class	?	Nan-Tuo 187	South Tug 187	南拖 187			South Sea Fleet	Active
Tugs of unidentified type/class	?	Nan-Tuo 188	South Tug 188	南拖 188			South Sea Fleet	Active

=== UAV motherships ===
List of Unmanned Aerial Vehicles motherships

Type	NATO designation	Pennant No.	Name (English)	Name (Han 中文)	Commissioned	Displacement	Fleet	Status
Chinese UAV mothership Fighting Shark No.1	?	Bo-Sha No.1	Fighting Shark No. 1	搏鲨1号	2021		All fleets	Active
Yanxi-class training ship / UAV mothership	Yanxi class	Xun 701	Training 701	训 701	1970	1,200 t	Dalian Naval Academy	Active

=== Unmanned surface vehicles ===
Just like most Chinese unmanned aerial vehicles (UAV)s are micro-UAVs, majority of Chinese Unmanned surface vehicles (USVs) are micro USVs. For better efficiency, most USVs used by PLAN are owned by Chinese civilian governmental agencies or private firms contracted by PLAN to perform various logistic tasks such as maintenance, surveying and research missions.

Type	Pennant No.	Name (English)	Name (Han 中文)	Commissioned	Displacement	Status
Type 80 demolition boat	Various	Not named	Not named	1980-1984	8.5 t	Being retired

=== Unmanned underwater vehicle ===
Type	Pennant No.	Name (English)	Name (Han 中文)	Commissioned	Displacement	Status
HSU-001	Various	Not named	Not named	2019	3 t	Active
Intelligent Water class AUVs	Zhi-Shui I	Intelligent Water I	智水 I	1990s	? t	Active
Intelligent Water class AUVs	Zhi-Shui II	Intelligent Water II	智水 II	1990s	? t	Active
Intelligent Water class AUVs	Zhi-Shui III	Intelligent Water III	智水 III	2000	? t	Active
Intelligent Water class AUVs	Zhi-Shui IV	Intelligent Water IV	智水 IV	2005	? t	Active
Intelligent Water class AUVs	Zhi-Shui V	Intelligent Water V	智水 V	October 2011	? t	Active
XTDT UUVs	Zhong-Guo-Wu-Ying TH-B010E	China Shadowless TH-B010E	中国无影 TH-B010E	?	? t	Active
7B8	Several (<10)	Various	Various	After 2000	1.69 t	Active
8A4	Several (<10)	Various	Various	After 2000	? t	Active
Dragon Pearl	Long-Zhu	Dragon Pearl	龙珠	2014	0.04 t	Active
RECON-IV	Several (<10)	Various	Various	?	? t	Active
Sea Pole	Hai-Ji	Sea Pole	海极	2003	? t	Active
Sea Star 6000	Hai-Xing 6000	Sea Star 6000	海星 6000	Late 2010s	3.5 t	Active

=== Weapon trials ships ===
Type	NATO designation	Pennant No.	Name (English)	Name (Han 中文)	Commissioned	Displacement	Fleet	Status
Type 909 weapon trials ship	Wuhu-B class	891	Bi Sheng	毕昇	December 1997	4630 t	All fleets	Active
Type 909A weapon trials ship	Dahua class	892	Hua Luogeng	华罗庚	2012	5000 t	All fleets	Active
Type 910 weapon trials ship	Dahua-II class	893	Zhan Tianyou	詹天佑	2012	6080 t	All fleets	Active
Type 910 weapon trials ship	Dahua-II class	894	Li Siguang	李四光	2014	6080 t	All fleets	Active
Type 910 weapon trials ship	Dahua-II class	895	Wu Yunduo	吴运铎	2018	6080 t	All fleets	Active
Type 910 weapon trials ship	Dahua-II class	896	Huang Weilu	黄纬禄	After 2018	6080 t	All fleets	Active

=== Museum ships ===
Museum ships only include those owned by PLAN/People's Liberation Army (PLA)/Chinese Ministry of Defense (CMoD) and thus still on Chinese naval registry, but do not include ships stricken from Chinese naval registry, such as those sold/transferred to local governments and private hands.

Type	NATO designation	Pennant No.	Name (English)	Name (Han 中文)	Commissioned	Displacement	Status
Type 031 ballistic submarine	Golf class	200	Long March # 200	长征 200号	September 2020	3,553 t	On Chinese naval registry
Type 033 submarine	Romeo class	237	Great Wall 237	长城 237	1998	1,830 t	On Chinese naval registry
Type 051 destroyer	Luda II class	105	Jinan	济南	2007	3,670 t	On Chinese naval registry
Type 053K frigate	Jiangdong class	531	Yingtan	鹰潭	1994	1,730 t	On Chinese naval registry
Type 091 submarine	Han class	401	Long March # 1	长征1号	2016	5,000 t	On Chinese naval registry
Type 6607 destroyer	Anshan class	101	Anshan	鞍山	1992	2,150 t	On Chinese naval registry
Type 021 missile boat	Huangfeng	3101	Not named	Not named	1960s	205 t	On Chinese naval registry
Type 024 missile boat	Not assigned	3139	Not named	Not named	1993	78 t	On Chinese naval registry
Minquan-class gunboat (replica)	Minquan class	53-219	Yangtze	长江	2021	464 t	On Chinese naval registry
Project 183 torpedo boat	P-6 class	245	Not assigned	Not assigned	1991	67 t	On Chinese naval registry
Japanese 25-ton riverine gunboat	N/A	414	Heroic Gunboat in the Toumenshan Naval Battle	头门山海战英雄艇	1960s	25 t	On Chinese naval registry
Gunboat converted from Landing craft, control	N/A, ex-USN craft	Not assigned	Liberation	解放	1989	28 t	On Chinese naval registry

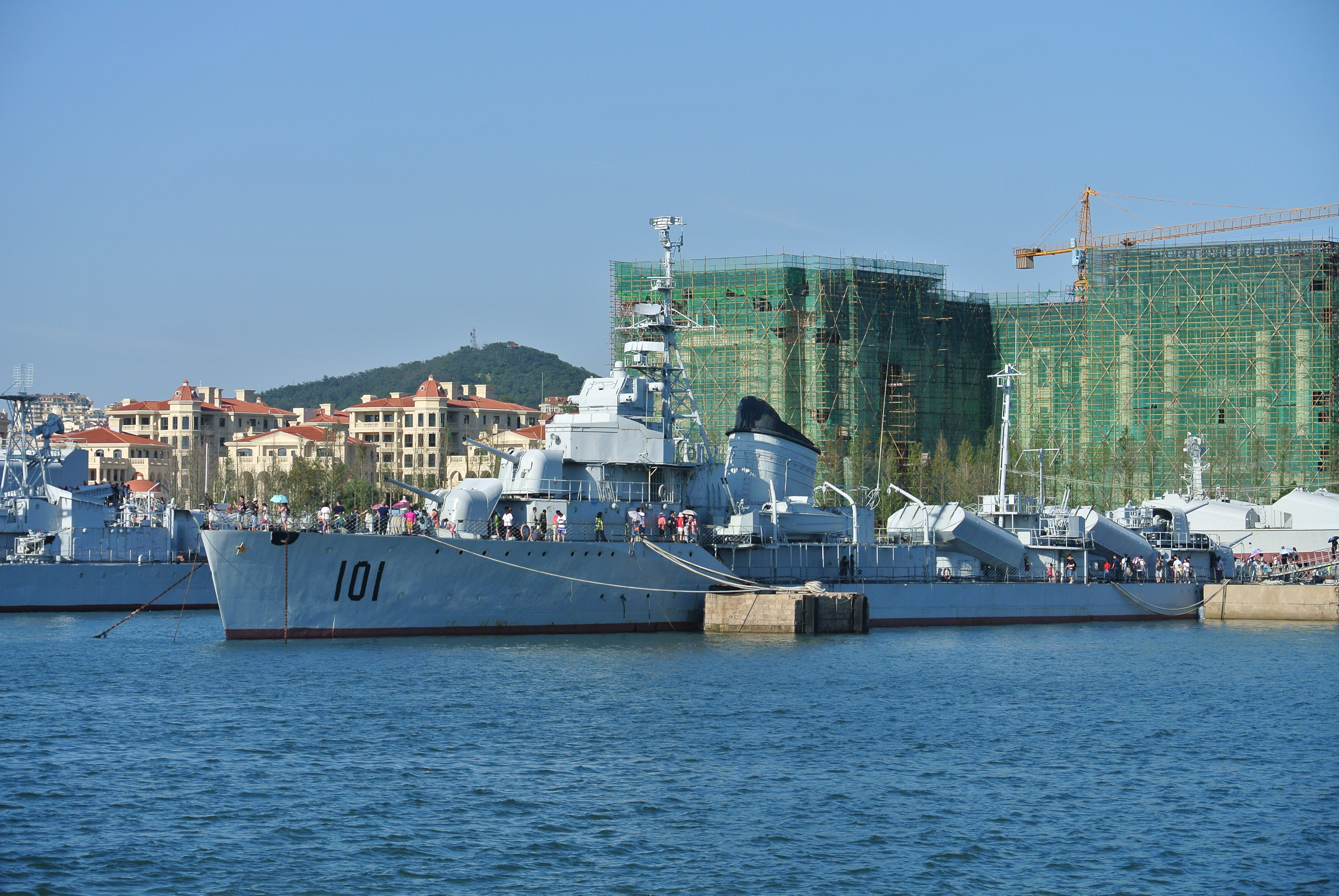
Type 6607 destroyer Anshan（Pennant #101）

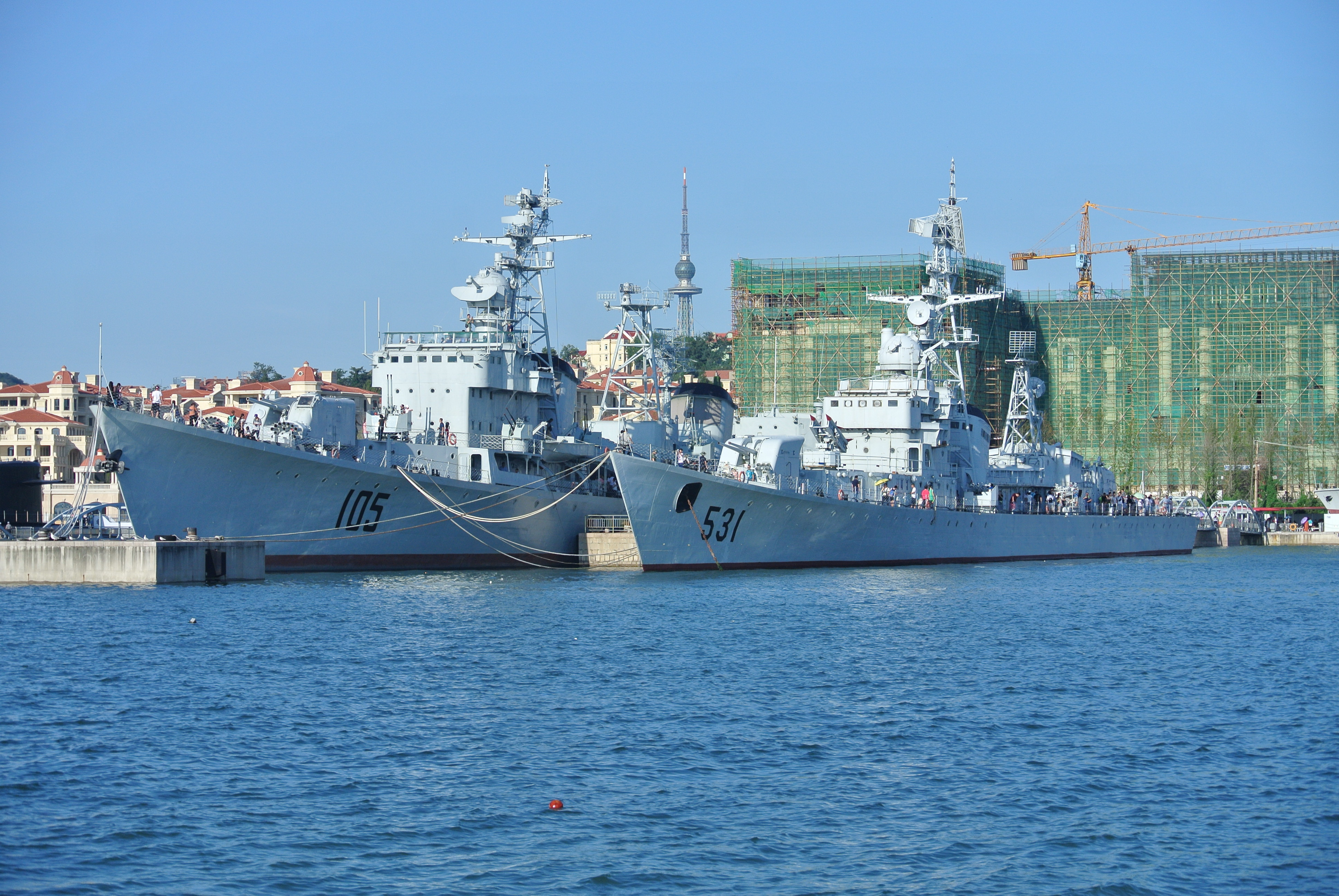
Type 051 destroyer Jinan（Pennant #105）& Type 053K frigate Yingtan（Pennant #531）

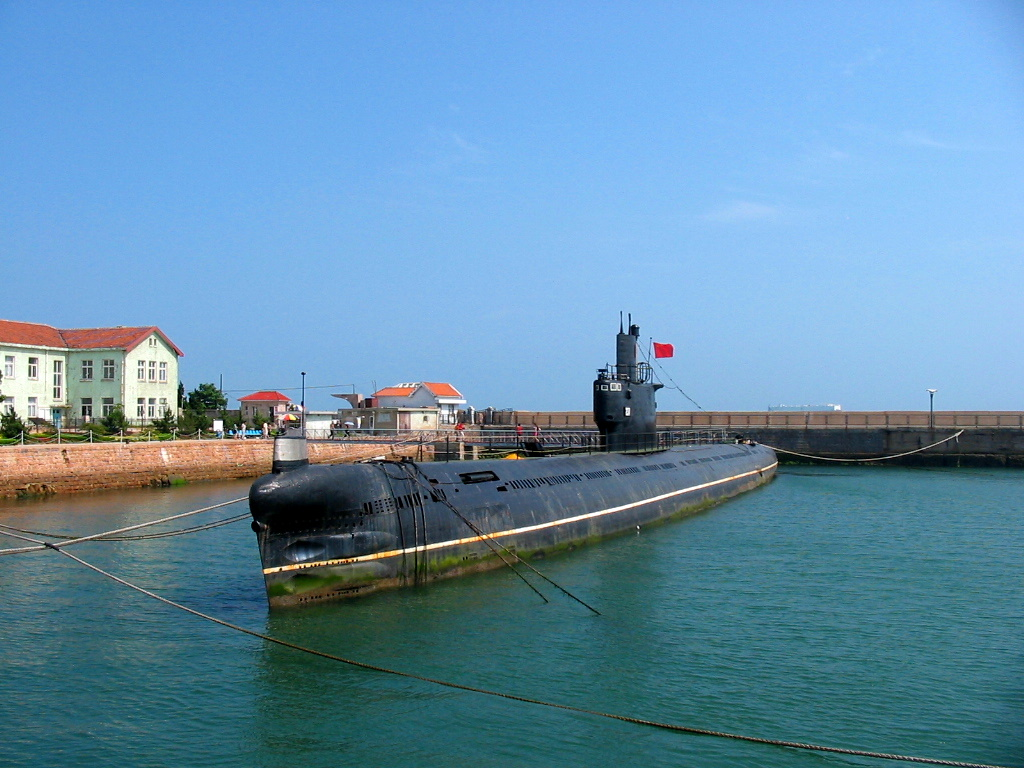
Type 033 submarine Great Wall 237（Pennant #237）

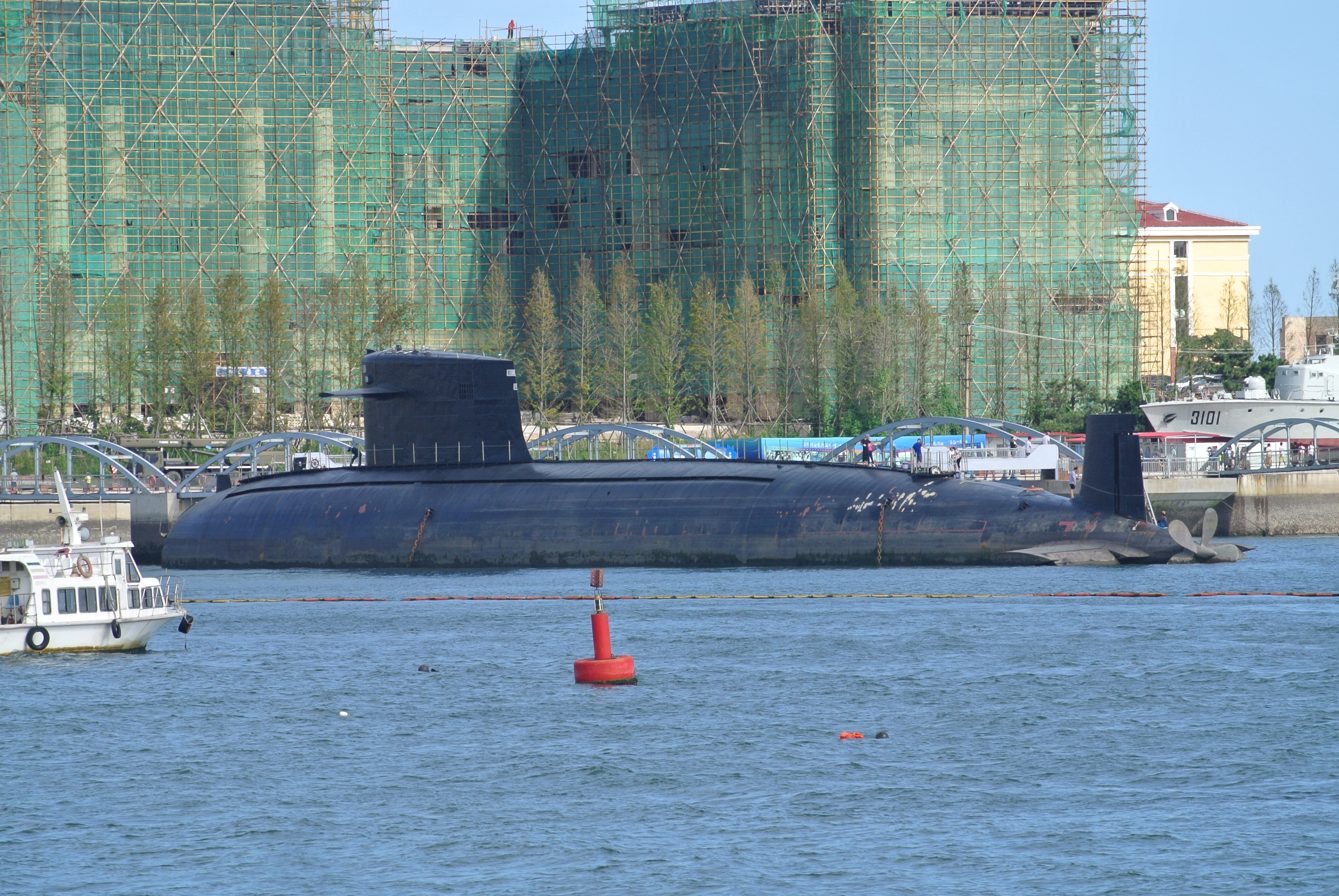
Type 091 nuclear attack submarine Long March #1 （Pennant #401）

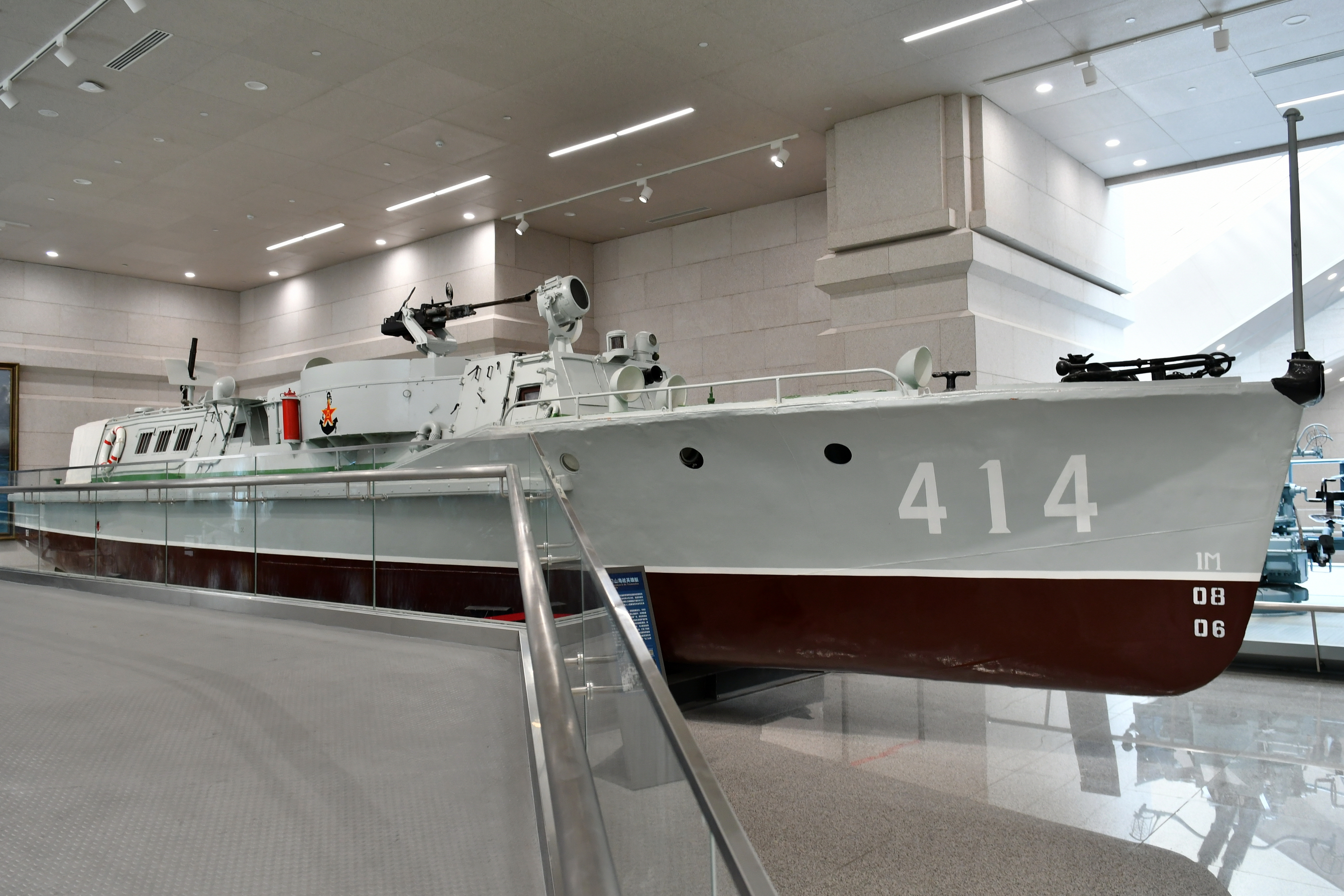
Heroic Gunboat in the Toumenshan Naval Battle (Pennant #414)

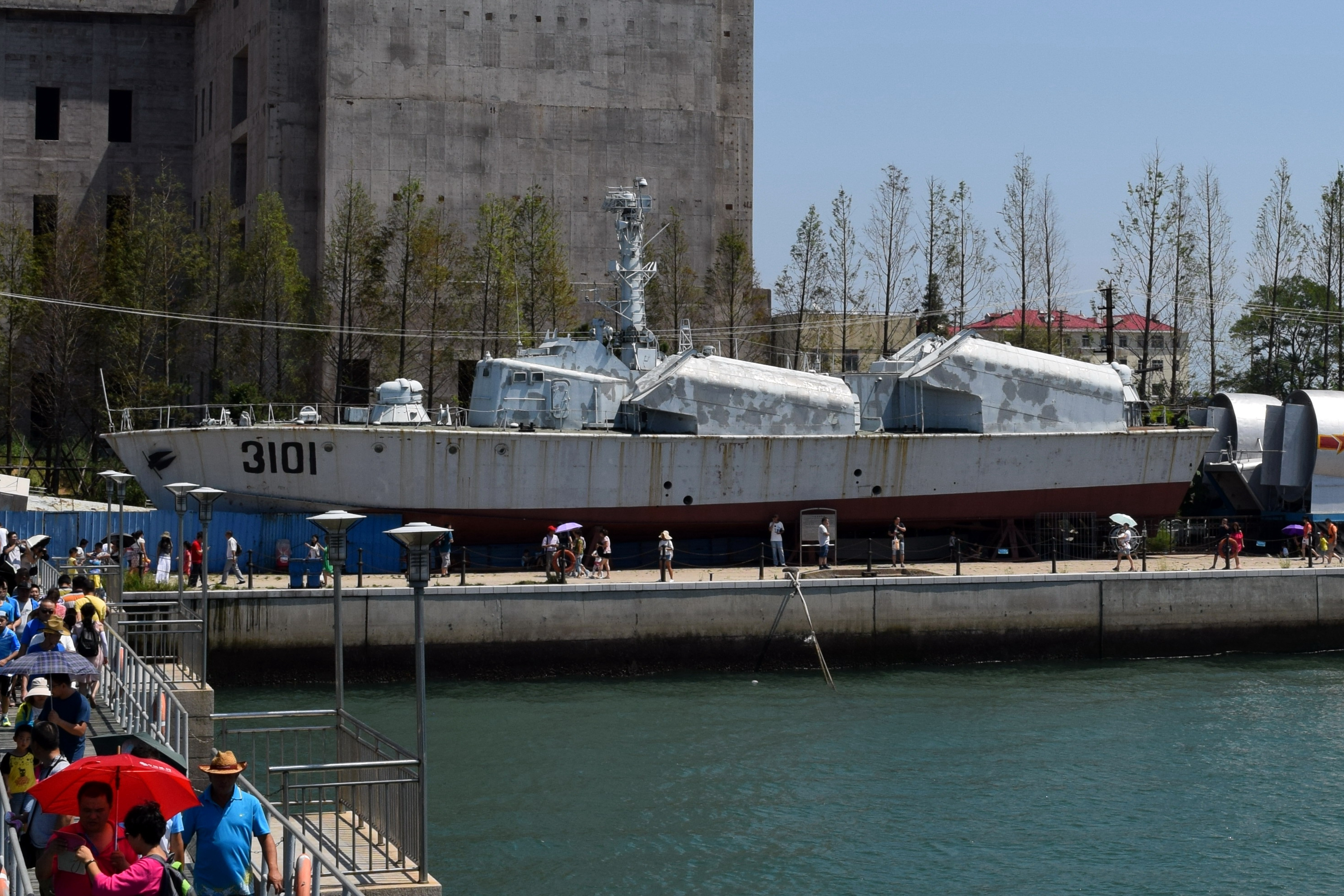
Type 021 missile boat # 3101

== Decommissioned ships ==
Decommissioned ships of PLAN only include those with every ship of the class has been struck from the Chinese naval registry, but do not include those classes with ships retired from frontline service and converted to auxiliaries, and thus still commissioned and thus remain on the Chinese naval registry.

=== Submarines ===
- Soviet M-class submarines: 4 units include Pennant # 201 thru 204, respectively named as National Defense (Guofang, 国防) # 21 thru 24, which in turn, were ex-Soviet submarines M-276 thru 279 respectively.
- Soviet S-class submarines: 4 units retired in 1963, including Pennant # 401 thru 404, respectively named as New China (Xin Zhong Guo 新中国) # 11 thru 14, which in turn, were ex-Soviet submarines S-52, 52, 24, 25 respectively.
- Type 033G Wuhan class medium submarine and Type 033G1 Wuhan-A class cruise missile attack submarine
- Type 6633/033/ES5A/ES5B Romeo-class submarines
- Type 030 submarine: never completed when cancelled in 1973 after construction begun in 1968.
- Type 032 midget submarine: Converted to Type 032-1 prior to completion
- Type 032-1 midget submarine: The only unit built was retired in the 1970s.
- Type 092 submarine: The sole unit of Type 092 nuclear powered ballistic submarine has been superseded by the much more advanced Type 094 submarine.
- Type 6631 ballistic submarine: converted to Type 031 ballistic submarine in 1978.
- Whiskey-class submarines: 5 units transferred from former-USSR and 21 domestically built units as Type 6603/03, all 26 have been retired.

=== Principal surface combatants ===
- Changbai & Nanning, that were ex-ROCS Gu'an & Coastal Defense No 7, which in turn, were ex-Imperial Japanese Navy Ship (IJNS) Oki & Manju, 2 Etorofu-class escort ships. Used by PLAN as Coastal defence ships (CDS) & retired in 1982 & 1979 respectively.
- Changsha, No 48, No 49, Jinan, Wuchang & Xi'an, that were ex-ROCS Jie(接) 12, ex-Soviet CKP-48 corvette, ex-Soviet CKP-49 corvette, ex-ROCS Weihai, ex-ROCS Jinan, ex-ROCS Jie(接) 14, which in turn, were respectively IJNS No 118, No 142, No 76, No 194, No 14 & No 198 of Type D escort ship. Used by PLAN as CDS & retired in 1975, 1983, 1983, 1975 (sunk as a target), 1956 & 1975 respectively.
- Chongqing, a light cruiser of ROCN of same name, which was ex-HMS Aurora (12). Defected to PLA on February 25, 1949, and sunk by RoCAF in the following month.
- Handan, Huaiyang (ship), Yancheng & Zunyi, all of them were Ruijin-class armed merchantman respectively converted from ex-Hoary stock, ex-Golden fragrant flower (金香花), ex-Clove Flower & ex-Dezhou, all of which were cargo ships of US coastal freighter Design 330D.
- Ji'an & Shenyang, which were ex-ROCS Ji'an & Huang'an, which in turn, were IJNS No 85 & 81 of Type C escort ships, Both were used by PLAN as CDS, with the former defected to PLA on April 23, 1949, and subsequently sunk by RoCAF on April 28, 1949, and the latter converted to acoustic research ship in 1966 after retired from the frontline service, and finally retired in 1980.
- Kaifeng, re-armed cargo ship Xiang De (祥德) converted from ex-HMS Clover (K134), a Flower-class corvette. Retired in 1989.
- Linyi, re-armed cargo ship He Le (和乐) converted from ex-USS Surprise (PG-63). Retired in 1972.
- Luoyang, re-armed cargo ship Xiang Xing (祥兴) converted from ex-HMAS Bendigo (J187). Retired in 1982.
- Ruijin & Xingguo, 2 Ruijin-class armed merchantmen converted from ex-Jiang Tong (江通) & ex-Jiang Da (江达), 2 cargo ships of US coastal freighter Design 381. The first unit was the first ship in PLAN named “Ruijin”, & sunk by RoCAF P-47s in 1954.
- Ruijin, a CDS that was ex-ROCS Hui'an, which in turn, was ex-IJNS Shisaka, an Hiburi-class escort ship. Second PLAN ship named as Ruijin, used by PLAN as CDS & retired in 1990.
- Type 6601/01/65/053H/053H2/053H2G frigates
- Type 051D/051DT/051Z/051G/051G1/051G2 destroyers
- The original Type 056 corvettes were handed to the Chinese Coast Guard, with their missiles removed.
- Type 052 destroyer Harbin was decommissioned in 28 Aug 2026.

=== Coastal & riverine warfare vessels ===
- The majority of Type 037IG missile boats(except for Laixi, Qufu and Shouguang) were decommissioned; two Type 037IGs, the Yuqing and the Shanghang were preserved as museum ships.
- Beihai class gunboats: approximately two dozen built, all retired.
- Huangpu class gunboats: including two 42-ton class (pennant # H846 & H847), eight 43-ton class, & 26 Type 52 gunboats.
- Fu River, a gunboat that was ex-ROCS Jiang Xi (江犀), which in turn, was ex-Japanese gunboat Sumida (1939).
- Guangzhou, re-armed cargo ship Yuan Pei (元培) converted from ex-HMS Nunney Castle (K446). Retired in 1974.
- Gunboat No 3-522, which were ex-ROCS Wufeng (舞凤), which in turn, were ex-IJNS Maiko (舞子), which in turn, was NRP Macau, finally retired in 1968.
- Min River, a gunboat that was ex-ROCS Changde, which in turn, was ex-Japanese gunboat Seta.
- Nanchang, a gunboat that was ex-ROCS Changzhi, which in turn, was ex-Japanese gunboat Uji (1940). Retired in 1979.
- Nen River, a gunboat that was ex-ROCS Yingde, which in turn, was ex-HMS Falcon (1931).
- Nu River, a gunboat that was ex-ROCS Yingshan, which in turn, was ex-HMS Gannet (1927).
- October & Vanguard, which were respectively ex-ROCS gunboat Guangguo (光国) & Gaoming (高明), which in turn, were IJNS No.1-class auxiliary submarine chasers No 220 & 223 respectively.
- Pearl River, a gunboat that was ex-ROCN Yong'an, which in turn, was ex-Japanese gunboat Futami.
- Sea Whale (Hai Jing, 海鲸), ex-ROCS No 101, an E-boat defected to PLA on April 23, 1949, converted to a training boat in 1951, retired in the 1960s.
- Wu River, gunboat that was ex-ROCS Yong Ping (永平), which in turn, was ex-Japanese gunboat Atami.
- Xiang Jiang (湘江), a gunboat that was ex-ROCS Yong Ji (永济), which in turn, was ex-Japanese gunboat Toba.
- Yan'an, ex-ROCS Yong Ji (永绩), a Yongfeng-class gunboat. Sunk on June 19, 1965, as a target during AShM test.
- Yangtze, ex-ROCN Minquan, retired to a museum ship on August 1, 1978, scrapped in July 1981. Because in February 1952, Mao Zedong was on board for four days and three nights inspecting PLAN, a replica has built & displayed at Chinese naval museum in Qingdao.
- Yichuan, ex-ROCS Chu Tong (楚同), a Chutai-class gunboat. Sunk in 1959 as a target in an AShM test.
- Yong Sui (永绥), ex-ROCS gunboat defected to PLA on April 23, 1949, and sunk five months later on September 23, 1949, by bombs dropped by RoCAF B-25s.
- Project 122bis submarine chasers with pennant # 611 to 616, respectively named as Dezhou, Jiaozhou, Changzhou, Tongzhou, Wenzhou & Taizhou, which were ex-Soviet BO-379/380/393/395/396/397 respectively.
- Project 123K (P-4 class) torpedo boats: several dozen transferred from former-USSR.
- Project 183T (P-8 class) torpedo boats: 1 unit transferred from former-USSR.
- Project 201M SO-1 class submarine chaser: No 471 transferred from former-USSR to PLAN.
- Project 205 (Osa I class) missile boats: 7 units transferred from former-USSR.
- Type 027/027II/027IIB torpedo boats: include 1 hydrofoil equipped Type 027, 1 Type 027II with different steel used in construction, & 1 Type 027IIB entered service in January 1984.
- Type 0101 gunboat
- Type 0105 gunboats: 4 units total, all retired
- Type 0108 gunboat: a single unit built & retired
- Type 0109 gunboats: 10 units total, all retired
- Type 0110 gunboats: 3 units built, all retired
- Type 0112 gunboat: the single hydrofoil equipped gunboat has retired
- Type 6602/02/7102II torpedo boats: including 24 Type 6602 & 63 Type 02 that included steel hulled Type 6702 & 7102II.
- Type 6604 & 04 submarine chasers: domestically built ex-Soviet Project 123bis, slightly modified Chinese version totaling 18, with pennant # 601 to 606, 631 to 636, & 651 to 656.
- Type 6621 missile boat: 122 units total, Chinese versions of Project 205 missile boat, all retired by June 2007.
- Type 6623 & 023 missile boats: Chinese version of Project 183R missile boats: 8 Type 6623 built with former-USSR supplied parts, 2 more indigenously built by China itself.
- Type 6624 missile boats: steel hulled Type 6623. A unit of Type 024, which is a development of Type 6624 with mast can be fold down for anchoring in bunkers, is kept as a museum ship.
- Type 6625/025/026/026II/R704 torpedo boats: all models retired by 2014.
- Yulin-class gunboats
- Chinese missile boat Nanhai - Type 037II missile boat retired in 2021; Now museum ship in Jieshou

=== Amphibious warfare ships ===
- LCI(L): captured from RoCN, & has since retired
- LCT Mk 5 & Mk 6: captured from RoCN & both have since tired
- LCU 1600 series: captured from RoCN & has since retired
- LST-542 class: captured from RoCN & has since retired
- Songling LCAC has retired
- Type 066/066K/066A Yuzhai class LCM: all have retired
- Type 072 landing ship: has retired
- Type 073 & Type 073II Yudao class landing ships: both have retired
- Type 079I & Type 079II Yulian class landing ships: both have retired
- Type 55 LCM has retired
- Type 271I & Type 271II LCUs: both have retired
- Type 363 & 363A LCM both have retired
- Type 711 LCAC has retired
- Type 716-I Dagu A class LCAC has retired
- Type 716-II Dagu B class LCAC has retired
- Type 722-I Jinsha I class LCAC has retired

=== Mine warfare vessels ===
List of mine warfare vessels:

- minelayer No 800, ex-Soviet Minelayer No 50, which in turn, was ex-IJNS Katashima, a Sokuten-class auxiliary minelayer (1913), retired in the early 1980s.
- Project 254 (T43 class) sea-going minesweeper: all units have retired
- Type 05 sea-going minesweeper: all units have retired
- Type 057K Lianyun class gulf minesweeper: all units have retired
- Type 058 riverine minesweeper: all 4 units have retired
- Type 062 Fushun class minesweeper: all 20 units have retired
- Type 918 Wolei class minelayer retired in 2012 & was transferred to China Coast Guard (CSG), becoming CSG cutter # 1212.
- Type 6605 sea-going minesweeper: all 4 units have retired
- Type 6610 sea-going minesweeper: all 4 units have retired
- Type 7102 minesweeper: The single unit built has since retired

=== Naval auxiliaries ===
- Dandao class cargo ship cargo ship: all units have retired
- Danlin-class cargo ship: all units have retired
- Galați-class cargo ship: all units have retired
- Leizhou-class tanker: all units have retired
- Autumn Wind (Qiu-Feng, or 秋风 in Chinese) degaussing/deperming ship converted from minesweeper has retired
- Bei-Tuo 710: the 3rd & last unit of Type 830 tug has been transferred to China Marine Surveillance (CMS), becoming CMS cutter # 110.
- Degaussing/Deperming 1 (Xiao-Ci 1, or消磁 1 in Chinese) degaussing/deperming ship has retired
- Degaussing/Deperming 951 (Xiao-Ci 951, or 消磁 951) degaussing/deperming ship has retired
- East Buoy (Dong-Biao, 东标 in Chinese) 263: This Type 744 buoy tender entered service in 1980 & has been transferred to civilian agency on August 1, 2015.
- Mount Tai: The first Chinese submarine tender Mt Tai has retired in 1988.
- Nan-Lan (南缆) 233 of Type 991 cable layer, retired & replaced by a Dong-Lan 885-class cable layer with the same pennant number/name.
- No. 323 degaussing/deperming ship has retired
- No. 629 degaussing/deperming ship has retired
- No. 731 degaussing/deperming ship has retired
- No. 744 degaussing/deperming ship has retired
- Panlong (蟠龙) degaussing/deperming ship converted from minesweeper, which in turn, was converted from large infantry landing craft has retired
- Sea Fishing 16 (Hai-Yu 16, 海渔 16 in Chinese) degaussing/deperming ship has retired
- Sea Magnetism 802 (Hai-Ci 海磁 802 in Chinese) degaussing/deperming ship has retired
- Zhangdian (张店) degaussing/deperming ship converted from minesweeper, which in turn, was converted from large infantry landing craft has retired
- Qiongsha class troop ship Nan Yun 830 & 831 have been retired & replaced by new ships of Darong class with the same pennant number.
- Chinese research ship Xiangyanghong 16: Collided with a Cypriot chemical tanker on May 2, 1993, and sunk, killing 3 crew members.
- Shuguang class ocean surveillance ships : 2 Shuguang class with pennant # Beidiao (北调) 994 and Beidiao 998 have retired.
- Type 64 demolition boat: all units have retired
- Type 071/071A/071G Yanha class icebreakers: The sole unit Type 071 with Pennant # 722 retired on Jun 7, 2013. Type 071A was upgraded to Type 071G during midlife upgrade, and transferred to Chinese Coast Guard in 2013 to become an icebreaking tug.
- Type 113 naval trawler
- Type 210 icebreaker (Yanbing class): The sole unit with Pennant # 723 has been transferred to Chinese Coast Guard on November 20, 2012.
- Type 308 demolition boat: all units have retired
- Type 308II demolition boat: all units have retired
- Type 595 ocean surveillance ship: 2 Type 595 AGOS Dongdiao (东调)223 Xiang-yang-hong (向阳红) No 4 and Nan-diao (南调) 485 Xiang-Yang-Hong No 6 have retired.
- Type 601 degaussing/deperming ship: The single unit built (Hai-Ci 951, or 海磁 in Chinese, meaning Sea Magnetism 951) has retired
- Type 614I & 614II weather ships, 614III oceanographic research ships: All units are either retired or transferred to Chinese Coast Guard.
- Type 625 research vessel: All units are either retired or transferred to civilian agencies.
- Type 626 Fuzhou-class tanker: all Fuzhou class tankers have been retired by the early 2020s.
- Type 632 Fulin-class tanker: all Fulin class tankers have been retired by the early 2020s.
- Type 636 hydrographic survey ship: The sole unit of Type 636 was transferred to Chinese Coast Guard on December 11, 2012.
- Type 701 roll-on/roll-off ship: After initially assigned to PLAN for extremely short period of time, the 1st unit was reassigned to PLAGF soon afterward, & all subsequent Type 701s have gone to PLAGF directly.
- Type 744 buoy tender has been retired on Aug 1, 2015 & transferred to civilian service.
- Type 801 naval trawler: All units have retired
- Type 810 target boat: all units have retired
- Type 813 spy ship: Transferred to Chinese Coast Guard and converted to PRCCGS # 3469 cutter.
- Type 890 cable layers: all 4 units have been transferred to PLAGF.
- Type 905 replenishment tanker: 4 units total, with # 881 Hongze Lake, # 882 Poyang Lake retired in 2018 and 2020 respectively, # 950 retired and sold to civilian as oil tanker Hailang in 1989. # 871 sold to Pakistan in 1987, becoming PNS Nasr.
- Type 922 rescue and salvage ship: the single unit built was transferred to Chinese Coast Guard and became Chinese Coast Guard cutter # 3411.
- Type 985 buoy tenders: all units were transferred from PLAN to Ministry of Transport of the People's Republic of China (MOT) in the early 1980s when maritime navigational responsibility was transferred from the former to the latter.
- Type 991I cable layer: the sole unit has been transferred to civilian agency.
- Type 994 buoy tenders: all units were transferred from PLAN to MOT in the early 1980s when maritime navigational responsibility was transferred from the former to the latter.
- Xiang-Yang-Hong 5 oceanographic research ship has retired in 1993.
- Yanding-class transport: Transport of this class were derived from fishing trawlers, & all 4 units including Dong-Yun (东运) 456, Dong-Yun (东运) 520, Dong-Yun (东运) 523, Dong-Yun (东运) 666 have retired.
- Yanfang class degaussing/deperming ship: Both units have retired
- Yerka class degaussing/deperming ship: Both units have retired

== See also ==
- People's Liberation Army Navy Surface Force - Further details on the surface ships of the PLAN
- People's Liberation Army Navy Submarine Force - Further details on the submarines of the PLAN
- Naval weaponry of the People's Liberation Army Navy
- List of ships of the China Coast Guard

== Bibliography ==
- Erickson, Andrew S.; Kennedy, Conor M.; Martinson, Ryan D., eds. (November 2024). Chinese Amphibious Warfare: Prospects for a Cross-Strait Invasion. CMSI Studies in China Maritime Development. Vol. 8. Naval War College Press. ISBN 978-1-935352-86-0.
- International Institute for Strategic Studies (3 February 2010). Hackett, James (ed.). The Military Balance 2010. London: Routledge. ISBN 978-1-85743-557-3.
- International Institute for Strategic Studies (2 March 2011). Hackett, James (ed.). The Military Balance 2011. London: Routledge. ISBN 978-1857436068.
- International Institute for Strategic Studies (7 March 2012). Hackett, James (ed.). The Military Balance 2012. London: Routledge. ISBN 978-1857436426.
- International Institute for Strategic Studies (14 March 2013). Hackett, James (ed.). The Military Balance 2013. London: Routledge. ISBN 978-1857436808.
- The International Institute for Strategic Studies (2025). The Military Balance 2025. London: Routledge. ISBN 978-1-041-04967-8.
