= List of auxiliary ship classes in service =

The list of auxiliary ship classes in service includes all auxiliary ships in naval service in the world. For combatant ships, see the list of naval ship classes in service.

== Command and support ships ==
=== Command ships ===
- Andenes command ship
  - Builder: Norway
  - Displacement: 3,000 tons
  - Operator: Royal Norwegian Navy: 3 in commission
- HSwMS Trossö Command ship
  - 2,140 tones
  - Operator: Swedish Navy

==== River command ships ====
- Kozara river command ship
  - Builder: Germany
  - Displacement: 600 tons
  - Operator: Republic of Singapore Navy

==== Amphibious command ships ====
- Blue Ridge-class joint command ship (LCC-19)
  - Builder: United States
  - Displacement: 19,700 tons
  - Operator: United States Navy: 2 in commission

=== Command and support ships ===
- Godetia tender
  - Displacement: 2,500 tons
  - Operator: Belgian Navy

=== Multi-role support ships ===
- Absalon-class flexible support ship / flexible combat vessel
  - Builder: Denmark
  - Displacement: 4500 tons (light), 6,600 tons (full load)
  - Operator: Royal Danish Navy: 2 ships commissioned. (Arguably a support ship, armed as a frigate)
- Karel Doorman-class multi-function support ship
  - Builder: Netherlands
  - Displacement: max 27,500 tons
  - Operator: Royal Netherlands Navy: 1 commissioned around 2014
- HMNZS Manawanui multi-role offshore support ship
  - Builder: Norway
  - Displacement: 5,741 tons
  - Operator: Royal New Zealand Navy
- Shichang multi-role training/support ship
  - Displacement: 9,500 tons
  - Operator: People's Liberation Army Navy

== Medical ships ==
=== Hospital ships ===
- Mercy-class hospital ship (AH-19)
  - Builder: United States
  - Displacement: 69,360 tonnes
  - Operator: United States Navy: 2 in commission
- Project 320A hospital ship
  - Builder: Soviet Union
  - Displacement: 11570 tonnes
  - Operator: Russian Navy: 2 in commission
- RFA Argus Primary Casualty Receiving Ship (A135)
  - builder: Italy converted by United Kingdom
  - Displacement: 28,081 tonnes
  - Operator: Royal Navy (Royal Fleet Auxiliary)
- Daishan Dao-class hospital ship (866)
  - Builder: China
  - Displacement: 14,000 tonnes
  - Operator: People's Liberation Army Navy

=== Medical evacuation ships ===
- Zhuanghe medical evacuation ship
  - Builder: China
  - Operator: People's Liberation Army Navy

=== Ambulance transport ships ===
- Qiongsha class ambulance transport ship
  - Builder: China
  - Displacement: 2,150 tonnes
  - Operator: People's Liberation Army Navy: 1 in commission

=== Ambulance craft ===
- Beiyi 01-class fast ambulance craft
  - Builder: China
  - Operator: People's Liberation Army Navy: 5 in commission

== Ammunition ships ==
  - Builder: China
  - Displacement: 410 tonnes
  - Operator: People's Liberation Army Navy: 1 in service
- Type 072-class ammunition ship
  - Builder: China
  - Displacement: 4,170 tonnes
  - Operator: People's Liberation Army Navy: 3 in service

=== Missile/rocket ammunition ships ===
- Yuan Wang 21 missile/rocket ammunition ship
  - Builder: China
  - Displacement: 9,080 tonnes
  - Operator: People's Liberation Army Navy
- Yuan Wang 22 missile/rocket ammunition ship
  - Builder: China
  - Operator: People's Liberation Army Navy

== Replenishment ships ==
- Fort Rosalie-class replenishment ship
  - Builder: United Kingdom
  - Displacement: 23,890 tons
  - Operator: Royal Navy, ( Royal Fleet Auxiliary), 2 in service
- Lewis and Clark-class dry cargo/ammunition ship (T-AKE-1)
  - Builder: United States
  - Displacement: 41,000 tons
  - Operator: United States Navy: 14 in commission
- Poolster-class replenishment ship
  - Builder: Netherlands
  - Displacement: 16,836 tons
  - Operator: Pakistan Navy: 1 in service
- Type 903 (Fuchi-class) replenishment ship
  - Builder: China
  - Displacement: 20,500 tons
  - Operator: People's Liberation Army Navy: 2 in commission
- Type 903A-class replenishment ship
  - Builder: China
  - Displacement: 23,400 tons
  - Operator: People's Liberation Army Navy
- Type 904 (Dayun-class) stores ship
  - Builder: China
  - Displacement: 10,975 tons
  - Operator: People's Liberation Army Navy: 2 in service
- Type 908 (Fusu- or Nancang-class) replenishment ship
  - Builder: Soviet Union
  - Displacement: 37,000 tons
  - Operator: People's Liberation Army Navy: 1 in commission
- Westerwald-class transport ship
  - Builder: Germany
  - Displacement: 4,042 tons
  - Operator: German Navy: 1 in service

=== Fast combat support ships ===
- Cheonji-class fast combat support ship
  - Builder: South Korea
  - Displacement: 9,113 tons
  - Operator Republic of Korea Navy: 3 in service
- Panshih-class (AOE-532) fast combat support ship
  - Builder: Republic of China
  - Displacement: 20,000 tons
  - Operator: Republic of China Navy: 1 in service
- Supply-class fast combat replenishment ship (AOE-6)
  - Builder: United States
  - Displacement: 50,000 tons
  - Operator: United States Navy: 2 in commission
- Type 901 class fast combat support ship
  - Builder: China
  - Displacement: 45,000 tons
  - Operator: People's Liberation Army Navy: 2 in commission
- Derya class fast combat support ship
  - Builder: Turkey
  - Displacement: 26,000 tons
  - Operator: Turkish Navy: 1 in service

== Tankers ==
=== Replenishment oilers ===
- Akar-class replenishment oiler
  - Builder: Turkey
  - Displacement: 19,350 tons
  - Operator: Turkish Navy: 2 in service
- HMNZS Aotearoa replenishment oiler
  - Builder: South Korea
  - Displacement: 26,000 tons
  - Operator: Royal New Zealand Navy
- Berlin-class (Type 702) combat support ship
  - Builder: Germany
  - Displacement: 20,240 tons
  - Operator German Navy: 3 in service
- Cantabria (A15) replenishment oiler
  - Builder: Spain
  - Displacement: 19,500 tons
  - Operator: Spanish Navy, 1 in service
- Durance-class replenishment oiler
  - Builder: France / Australia
  - Displacement: 17,900 tons
  - Operators:
    - French Navy: 4 in service
    - Argentine Navy: 1 in service, former Durance
    - Royal Australian Navy: 1 in service as HMAS Success (built in Australia)
- HS Orion replenishment oiler
  - Builder: Greece
  - Displacement: 643 tons
  - Operator: Hellenic Navy
- Fort Victoria-class replenishment oiler
  - Builder: United Kingdom
  - Displacement: 32,818 tons
  - Operator: Royal Navy, ( Royal Fleet Auxiliary), 1 in service
- Mashū-class replenishment oiler
  - Builder: Japan
  - Displacement: 25,000 tons
  - Operator: Japan Maritime Self-Defense Force: 2 in service
- HNoMS Maud replenishment oiler
  - Builder: South Korea / Norway
  - Displacement: 27,500 tons
  - Operator: Royal Norwegian Navy
- Patiño replenishment oiler
  - Builder: Spain
  - Displacement: 17,045 tons
  - Operator: Spanish Navy, 1 in service
- HMAS Sirius replenishment tanker
  - Builder: South Korea
  - Displacement: 25,000 tons
  - Operator: Royal Australian Navy: 1 in service
- Stromboli-class replenishment ship
  - Builder: Italy
  - Displacement: 8,700 tons
  - Operator: Marina Militare: 2 in service
- Tide-class replenishment oiler
  - Builder: South Korea / United Kingdom
  - Displacement: 39,000 tons
  - Operator: Royal Navy, ( Royal Fleet Auxiliary), 4 in service
- Towada-class replenishment oiler
  - Builder: Japan
  - Displacement: 15,000 tons
  - Operator: Japan Maritime Self-Defense Force: 3 in service
- Beiyou 572-class replenishment oiler
  - Builder: China
  - Operator: People's Liberation Army Navy: 4 in service
- Type 631-class replenishment oiler
  - Builder: China
  - Displacement: 2,300 tons
  - Operator: People's Liberation Army Navy: 7 in service
- Type 905 (Fuqing-class) replenishment oiler
  - Builder: China
  - Displacement: 21,750 tons
  - Operator: Pakistan Navy: 1 in service

=== Transport tankers and oilers ===
- Alyay-class fleet oiler (Project 160)
  - Builder: Finland
  - Displacement: 7,225 tons
  - Operator: Russian Navy: 4 in service
- Boris Chilikin-class fleet oiler (Project 1559)
  - Builder: Soviet Union
  - Displacement: 22,460 tons
  - Operator: Russian Navy: 4 in service
- BAP Tacna fleet oiler
  - Builder: Netherlands
  - Displacement: 17,040 tons
  - Operator: Peruvian Navy, 1 in service
- Chesapeake-class transport tanker (AOT-5084)
  - Builder: United States
  - Displacement: 65,000 tons
  - Operator: United States Navy: 2 in commission
- Dubna-class fleet oiler
  - Builder: Soviet Union
  - Displacement: 11,140 tons
  - Operator: Russian Navy: 2 in service
- Gus W. Darnell-class transport tanker (AOT-1125)
  - Builder: United States
  - Displacement: 40,000 tons
  - Operator: United States Navy: 5 in commission
- Henry J. Kaiser-class fleet oiler
  - Builder: United States
  - Displacement: 42,000 tons
  - Operators:
    - United States Navy: 13 in commission
    - Chilean Navy: 1 in commission
- Olekma-class fleet oiler
  - Builder: Finland
  - Displacement: 6,440 tons
  - Operator: Russian Navy: 2 in service
- Panarea-class gasoline tanker
  - Builder: Italy
  - Displacement: 863 tons
  - Operator: Marina Militare: 4 in service
- Rhön-class tanker
  - Builder: Germany
  - Displacement: 14,169 tons
  - Operator: German Navy, 2 in service
- Rover-class tanker
  - Builder: United Kingdom
  - Displacement: 11,500 tons (loaded)
  - Operators:
    - Indonesian Navy, 1 in service
    - Portuguese Navy, 1 in service
    - Royal Navy ( Royal Fleet Auxiliary), 2 in service
- Uda-class fleet oiler (Project 577)
  - Builder: Soviet Union
  - Displacement: 7,160 tons
  - Operator: Russian Navy: 5 in service
- Vyaz'ma fleet oiler
  - Displacement: 8,900 tons
  - Operator: Russian Navy
- Walchensee-class tanker
  - Builder: Germany
  - Displacement: 2,191 tons
  - Operator: German Navy, 2 in service
- Wave-class tanker
  - Builder: United Kingdom
  - Displacement: 34,500 tons
  - Operator: Royal Navy, ( Royal Fleet Auxiliary), 2 in service
- Albay Hakkı Burak class oil tanker
  - Builder: Turkey
  - Displacement: 3,200 tons
  - Operator: Turkish Navy: 2 in service

==== Coastal tankers ====
- Fuzhou-class coastal tanker
  - Builder: China
  - Displacement: 1,200 tons
  - Operator: People's Liberation Army Navy: 32 in service
- Jinyou-class coastal tanker
  - Builder: China
  - Displacement: 4,800 tons
  - Operator: People's Liberation Army Navy: 3 in service
- Khobi-class coastal tanker
  - Builder: Soviet Union
  - Displacement: 1,525 tons
  - Operators:
    - Albanian Naval Force: 1 delivered in 1959
- Leizhou-class coastal tanker
  - Builder: China
  - Displacement: 900 tons
  - Operator: People's Liberation Army Navy: 9 in service
- Type 620 (Shengli-class) coastal tanker
  - Builder: China
  - Displacement: 4,940 tons
  - Operator: People's Liberation Army Navy: 2 in service
- Type 632 (Fulin-class) coastal tanker
  - Builder: China
  - Displacement: 2,200 tons
  - Operator: People's Liberation Army Navy: 19 in service

==== Water tankers ====
- Simeto-class water tanker
  - Builder: Italy
  - Displacement: 1,968 tons
  - Operators:
    - Marina Militare: 2 in service
    - Tunisian National Navy: 1 in service

== Tenders ==
- Elbe-class (Type 404) tender
  - Builder: Germany
  - Displacement: 3,586 tons
  - Operator German Navy: 6 in service
- Lubin-class small craft support ship
  - Builder: BSO Split
  - Displacement: 880 tons
  - Operator: Navy of Serbia and Montenegro: 1 in service of 3 built
- Rhin-class tender
  - Displacement: 2,445 tons
  - Operator: French Navy: 2 in service
- Vis small craft command and support ship
  - Builder: ??
  - Displacement: 680 tons
  - Operator: Navy of Serbia and Montenegro

=== Buoy tenders ===
- Class A Balsam-class buoy tender
  - Builder: United States
  - Displacement: 1,025 tons
  - Operators:
    - Estonian Navy: 1 delivered in 1997 from the US Coast Guard
    - United States Coast Guard: 5 in commission
- Gasconade-class river buoy tender (WLR-75401)
  - Builder: United States
  - Displacement: 141 tons
  - Operator: United States Coast Guard: 9 in commission
- Juniper-class buoy tender (WLB-201)
  - Builder: United States
  - Displacement: 2,000 tons
  - Operator: United States Coast Guard: 16 in commission
- Keeper-class buoy tender
  - Builder: United States
  - Displacement: 840 tons
  - Operator: United States Coast Guard: 14 in commission
- Ouachita-class buoy tender (WLR-65501)
  - Builder: United States
  - Displacement: 143 tons
  - Operator: United States Coast Guard: 6 in service
- Type 066 class buoy tender
  - Builder: China
  - Displacement: 70 tons
  - Operator: People's Liberation Army Navy
- Type 744-class buoy tender
  - Builder: China
  - Displacement: 1750 tons
  - Operator: People's Liberation Army Navy
- Type 911I-class buoy tender
  - Builder: China
  - Displacement: 135 tons
  - Operator: People's Liberation Army Navy
- Type 999-class buoy tender
  - Builder: China
  - Displacement: 95 tons
  - Operator: People's Liberation Army Navy

==== Buoy tugs ====
- Alcyon-class ocean tug and buoy tender
  - Displacement: 1,500 tons
  - Operator: French Navy: 2 in service

=== Dive tenders ===
- Type 904I-class dive tender
  - Builder: China
  - Displacement: 1,354.8 tons
  - Operator: People's Liberation Army Navy
- Type 904II-class dive tender
  - Builder: China
  - Displacement: 1,327 tons
  - Operator: People's Liberation Army Navy
- Vulcain diving tender
  - Builder: France
  - Displacement: 490 tons
  - Operator: French Navy

=== Submarine tenders ===
- Kashtan submersible support ship
  - Displacement: 5,250 tons
  - Operator: Russian Navy
- Kommuna submersible support ship
  - Displacement: 2,450 tons
  - Operator: Russian Navy
- Malina-class submarine tender (Project 2020)
  - Builder: Soviet Union / Ukraine
  - Displacement: 13,900 tons
  - Operator: Russian Navy: 3 in service
- Mercuur class submarine tender
  - Builder: Netherlands
  - Displacement: 1,400 Tons
  - Operator: Royal Netherlands Navy
- Pionier Moskvyy-class submersible support ship (Project 05360)
  - Builder: Soviet Union
  - Displacement: 7,960 tons
  - Operator: Russian Navy: 4 in service
- Ugra-class submarine tender (Project 1886.1)
  - Builder: Soviet Union
  - Displacement: 9,650 tons
  - Operator: Russian Navy: 2 in service
- Type 925 (Dajiang-class) submarine tender and salvage ship
  - Builder: China
  - Displacement: 10,087 tons
  - Operator: People's Liberation Army Navy: 3 in service
- Type 926-class submarine support ship
  - Builder: China
  - Displacement: 9,500 tons
  - Operator: People's Liberation Army Navy: 3 in service

=== Degaussing ships ===
- Bereza-class degaussing ship (Project 130)
  - Builder: Poland
  - Displacement: 2,050 tons
  - Operators:
    - Russian Navy: 17 in service
    - Bulgarian Navy: 1 in service
- Pelym-class degaussing ship (Project 1799)
  - Builder: Soviet Union
  - Displacement: 1,200 tons
  - Operator: Russian Navy: 17 in service
- Type 911 degaussing ship
  - Builder: China
  - Operator: People's Liberation Army Navy: 2 in service
- Type 912 degaussing ship
  - Builder: China
  - Displacement: 828 tons
  - Operator: People's Liberation Army Navy: 1 in service
- Type 912I degaussing ship
  - Builder: China
  - Operator: People's Liberation Army Navy: 1 in service
- Type 912III (Yanbai class) degaussing ship
  - Builder: China
  - Displacement: 570 tons
  - Operator: People's Liberation Army Navy: 1 in service
- Type 912IIIA degaussing ship
  - Builder: China
  - Operator: People's Liberation Army Navy: 2 in service
- Type 912IIIAH degaussing ship
  - Builder: China
  - Operator: People's Liberation Army Navy: 3 in service

== Repair ships ==
- Aditya-class replenishment and repair ship
  - Builder: India
  - Displacement: 24,612 tons
  - Operator: Indian Navy: 1 in service
- Amur-class repair ship (Project 304)
  - Builder: Poland
  - Displacement: 5,500 tons
  - Operator: Russian Navy: 11 in service
- Emory S. Land-class submarine tender/repair ship (AS-39)
  - Builder: United States
  - Displacement: 22,900 tons
  - Operator: United States Navy: 2 in commission
- Garonne-class small repair ship
  - Displacement: 2,320 tons
  - Operator: French Navy
- Oskol-class repair ship (Project 300/301/303)
  - Builder: Poland
  - Displacement: 2,700 tons
  - Operator: Russian Navy: 8 in service
- Type 648 (Dadao-class) submarine repair ship
  - Builder: China
  - Displacement: 1,962 tons
  - Operator: People's Liberation Army Navy: 1 in service

=== Dry docks ===
- 120t class dry dock
  - Builder: China
  - Displacement: 526.49 tons
  - Operator: People's Liberation Army Navy: 1 in service
- Dongxiu 912-class dry dock
  - Builder: China
  - Operator: People's Liberation Army Navy: 1 in service
- Hua Chuan No. 1-class dry dock
  - Builder: China
  - Displacement: 13,000 tons
  - Operator: People's Liberation Army Navy: 1 in service

== Engineering vessels ==
=== Dredgers ===
- Dredger 1 dredger
  - Builder: India
  - Operator: Indian Navy
- 8-m^{3} class dredger
  - Builder: China
  - Operator: People's Liberation Army Navy
- Beijun 204-class dredger
  - Builder: China
  - Operator: People's Liberation Army Navy
- Dongjun 417-class dredger
  - Builder: China
  - Operator: People's Liberation Army Navy
- Dongjun 433-class dredger
  - Builder: China
  - Operator: People's Liberation Army Navy
- Dongjun 434-class dredger
  - Builder: China
  - Operator: People's Liberation Army Navy
- Nanjun 610-class dredger
  - Builder: China
  - Operator: People's Liberation Army Navy

=== Crane ships ===
- Diamond State-class crane ship (ACS-7)
  - Builder: United States
  - Displacement: 31,500 tons
  - Operator: United States Navy: 2 in commission
- Gopher State-class crane ship (ACS-4)
  - Builder: United States
  - Displacement: 25,000 tons
  - Operator: United States Navy: 3 in commission
- Green Mountain State-class crane ship (ACS-9)
  - Builder: United States
  - Displacement: 31,500 tons
  - Operator: United States Navy: 2 in commission
- Keystone State-class crane ship (ACS-1)
  - Builder: United States
  - Displacement: 31,500 tons
  - Operator: United States Navy: 3 in commission

=== Construction ships ===
- Anvil-class inland construction tender (WLIC-75301)
  - Builder: United States
  - Displacement: 145 tons
  - Operator: United States Coast Guard: 8 in service
- Pamlico-class inland construction tender (WLIC-800)
  - Builder: United States
  - Displacement: 416 tons
  - Operator: United States Coast Guard: 4 in commission

=== Cable laying ships ===
- Type 890 (Youzheng-class) cable ship
  - Builder: China
  - Displacement: 750 tons
  - Operator: People's Liberation Army Navy: 3 in service
- Type 991II (Youdian-class) cable ship
  - Builder: China
  - Displacement: 1,550 tons
  - Operator: People's Liberation Army Navy: 9 in service, including 3 modified as buoy tenders
- USNS Zeus cable ship (ARC-7)
  - Displacement: 15,000 tons
  - Operator: United States Navy

== Surveillance and intelligence vessels ==
=== Ocean surveillance ships ===
- Hibiki-class ocean surveillance ship
  - Builder: Japan
  - Displacement: 3,861 tons
  - Operator: Japan Maritime Self-Defense Force: 2 in service
- Impeccable-class Ocean Surveillance Ship (T-AGOS-23)
  - Displacement: 5,368 tons
  - Operator: United States Navy
- Stalwart-class Ocean Surveillance Ship (T-AGOS-1)
  - Builder: United States
  - Displacement: 2,285 tons
  - Operators
    - United States Navy
    - Portuguese Navy: 2 in service
- Victorious-class Ocean Surveillance Ship (T-AGOS-19)
  - Builder: United States
  - Displacement: 3,370 tons
  - Operator: United States Navy: 4 in commission

=== Electronic surveillance ships ===
- Alpinist-class electronic surveillance ships (Project 503M)
  - Builder: Soviet Union
  - Displacement: 1,140 tons
  - Operator: Russian Navy: 3 in service
- Bougainville electronic surveillance ship
  - Displacement: 10,250 tons
  - Operator: French Navy
- FS Eger electronic surveillance ship
  - Builder: Norway
  - Displacement: 7,560 tons
  - Operator: Royal Norwegian Navy
- Elettra-class electronic surveillance ship
  - Builder Italy
  - Displacement: 3,180 tons
  - Operators:
    - Marina Militare, NATO: 1 in service
    - Marina Militare: 1 in service
    - Republic of China Navy: 1 in service
- Lira-class electronic surveillance ship (Project 1826)
  - Builder: Soviet Union
  - Displacement: 4,900 tons
  - Operator: Russian Navy: 1 in service
- FS Marjata electronic surveillance ship
  - Builder: Norway
  - Displacement: 5,300 tons
  - Operator: Royal Norwegian Navy
- Oste-class (Type 423) electronic surveillance ship
  - Builder: Germany
  - Displacement: 3,200 tons
  - Operator: German Navy: 3 in service
- Primor'ye-class electronic surveillance ship (Project 394B)
  - Builder: Soviet Union
  - Displacement: 4,340 tons
  - Operator: Russian Navy: 2 in service
- Vishnaya-class electronic surveillance ship (Project 864)
  - Builder: Soviet Union
  - Displacement: 3,470 tons
  - Operator: Russian Navy: 7 in service
- Type 814A (Dadie-class) electronic surveillance ship
  - Builder: China
  - Displacement: 2,198 tons
  - Operator: People's Liberation Army Navy: 1 in service
- Type 815-class electronic surveillance ship
  - Builder: China
  - Displacement: 6,000 tons
  - Operator: People's Liberation Army Navy: 1 in service
- Type 815A-class electronic surveillance ship
  - Builder: China
  - Operator: People's Liberation Army Navy: 4 in service
- Type 815G-class electronic surveillance ship
  - Builder: China
  - Operator: People's Liberation Army Navy: 4 in service
- Ufuk class signals intelligence gathering vessel
  - Builder: Turkey
  - Displacement: 2250 tons
  - Operator: Turkish Navy: 1 in service

=== Missile tracking ships ===
- Monge missile tracking ship
  - Displacement: 21,040 tons
  - Operator: French Navy
- Observation Island Missile Range Instrumentation Ship (T-AGM-23)
  - Displacement: 17,000 tons
  - Operator: United States Navy
- Waters navigation research and missile tracking ship (T-AGS-45)
  - Displacement: 12,000 tons
  - Operator: United States Navy
- Yuan Wang-class missile tracking and space event support ship
  - Builder: China
  - Displacement: 21,000 tons
  - Operator: People's Liberation Army Navy: 4 in service

== Research and scientific vessels ==
- Alliance (A 5345) research ship
  - Builder: Italy
  - Displacement: 3,120 tons
  - Operator: Marina Militare, NATO
- JS Asuka experimental ship
  - Builder: Japan
  - Displacement: 6,299 tons
  - Operator: Japan Maritime Self-Defense Force
- RV Belgica coastal research ship
  - Displacement: 835 tons
  - Operator: Ukraine
- Helmsand-class trial and fleet service ships (Type 748)
  - Builder: Germany
  - Operator: German Navy: 3 in service
- Leonardo (A 5301) research ship
  - Builder Italy
  - Displacement: 337 tons
  - Operator: Marina Militare
- Planet-class (Type 751) research ship (SWATH vessel)
  - Builder: Germany
  - Displacement: 3,500 tons
  - Operator: German Navy: 1 in service
- Rossetti-class research ship
  - Builder: Italy
  - Displacement: 324 tons
  - Operator: Marina Militare, 2 in service
- Shijian-class research ship
  - Builder: China
  - Displacement: 3,000 tons
  - Operator: People's Liberation Army Navy: 3 in service
- Type 6610 (Shuguang-class) research ship
  - Builder: China
  - Displacement: 2,400 tons
  - Operator: People's Liberation Army Navy: 8 in service
- Wilhelm Pullwer-class trial boat (Type 741)
  - Builder: Germany
  - Operator: German Navy: 1 in service
- Xiangyanghong-class research ship
  - Builder: China
  - Displacement: 10,000 tons
  - Operator: People's Liberation Army Navy: 12 in service in various configurations
- Yanlun-class research ship
  - Builder: China
  - Displacement: 2,000 tons
  - Operator: People's Liberation Army Navy: 3 in service
- Yannan-class research ship
  - Builder: China
  - Displacement: 1,750 tons
  - Operator: People's Liberation Army Navy: 4 in service

=== Acoustic research vessels ===
- USNS Hayes acoustic trials ship (T-AG-195)
  - Displacement: 4,000 tons
  - Operator: United States Navy
- INS Sagardhwani acoustic research ship
  - Builder: India
  - Displacement: 2,083 tons
  - Operator: Indian Navy

=== Survey vessels ===
- Baldur-class coastal survey ship
  - Builder: Iceland
  - Displacement: 50 tons
  - Operator: Icelandic Coast Guard: 1 in commission
- ARA Comodoro Rivadavia coastal hydrographic survey ship
  - Builder: Argentina
  - Displacement: 827 tons
  - Operator: Argentine Navy
- USNS John McDonnell coastal survey ship (T-AGS-51)
  - Builder: United States
  - Displacement: 2,000 tons
  - Operator: United States Navy: 2 in commission
- Lapérouse-class survey ship
  - Displacement: 980 tons
  - Operator: French Navy: 4 in service
- Makar-class hydrographic survey catamaran
  - Builder: India
  - Displacement: 500 tons
  - Operator: Indian Navy
- Moma-class survey ship (Project 861)
  - Builder: Soviet Union / Poland
  - Displacement: 1,600 tons
  - Operator: Croatian Navy: 1 in service
- Sandhayak-class survey ship
  - Builder: India
  - Displacement: 1,960 tons
  - Operator: Indian Navy: 7 in service
- HMS Scott ocean survey vessel
  - Builder United Kingdom
  - Displacement: 13,500 tons
  - Operator: Royal Navy 1 in service
- Type 635 A/B/C (Yanlai class) hydrographic survey ship
  - Builder: China
  - Displacement: 1,100 tons
  - Operator: People's Liberation Army Navy: 4 in service
- Valerian Uryvayav-class survey ship
  - Builder: Soviet Union
  - Displacement: 1,050 tons
  - Operators:
    - Lithuanian Naval Force: 1 delivered in 1991 for training and coastal survey
- Çubuklu class survey ship
  - Builder: Turkey
  - Displacement: 643 tons
  - Operator: Turkish Navy: 1 in service

==== Hydro-oceanographic Survey vessels ====
- ARA Austral (Q-21) hydro-oceanographic survey ship
  - Builder: Germany
  - Displacement: 4,952 tons
  - Operator: Argentine Navy
- Ninfe-class hydro-oceanographic research ship
  - Builder Italy
  - Displacement: 415 tons
  - Operator: Marina Militare: 2 in service

=== Oceanographic Research vessels ===
- Cabo de Hornos oceanographic research ship
  - Builder: Norway / ASMAR Chile Chile
  - Displacement: 3,020 tons
  - Operator: Chilean Navy: 1 in service
- Ammiraglio Magnaghi oceanographic research ship
  - Builder Italy
  - Displacement: 1,744 tons
  - Operator: Marina Militare
- Melville-class oceanographic research/survey ship (T-AGOR-14)
  - Builder: United States
  - Displacement: 2,670 tons
  - Operator: United States Navy: 2 in commission
- Pathfinder-class oceanographic research/survey ship (AGS 60)
  - Builder: United States
  - Displacement: 4,750 tons
  - Operator: United States Navy: 6 in commission
- Thomas G. Thompson class oceanographic research/survey ship (T-AGOR-23)
  - Builder: United States
  - Displacement: 3,250 tons
  - Operator: United States Navy: 3 in commission
- Çeşme class oceanographic survey ship
  - Builder: United States
  - Displacement: 2,550 tons
  - Operator: Turkish Navy: 1 in service

==== Polar Oceanographic Research vessels ====
- BIO Las Palmas polar oceanographic research vessel
  - Builder: Spain
  - Displacement: 1,500 tons
  - Operator: Spanish Navy
- ARA Puerto Deseado polar oceanographic survey vessel
  - Builder: Argentina
  - Displacement: 2,400 tons
  - Operator: Argentine Navy

== Icebreakers ==
- Eisvogel-class icebreaker
  - Builder: Germany
  - Displacement: 560 tons
  - Operators:
    - Marina Militare: 1 in service
    - Royal Netherlands Navy: 1 in service
- Type 272 class icebreaker
  - Builder: China
  - Displacement: 4,860 tons
  - Operator: People's Liberation Army Navy: 2 in service

=== Lake icebreakers ===
- USCGC Mackinaw lake icebreaker (WLBB-30)
  - Displacement: 3,500 tons
  - Operator: United States Coast Guard

=== Electronic surveillance icebreakers ===
- Type 071G class icebreaker and electronic surveillance ship
  - Builder: China
  - Displacement: 3,192 tons
  - Operator: People's Liberation Army Navy: 1 in service

==== Electronic surveillance / hydrographic research icebreakers ====
- Type 210 class electronic surveillance / hydrographic research icebreaker
  - Builder: China
  - Displacement: 4,420 tons
  - Operator: People's Liberation Army Navy: 1 in service

=== Polar icebreakers ===
- USCGC Healy polar icebreaker (WAGB-20)
  - Builder: United States
  - Displacement: 16,400 tons
  - Operator: United States Coast Guard
- Polar-class polar icebreaker (WAGB-10)
  - Builder: United States
  - Displacement: 13,600 tons
  - Operator: United States Coast Guard: 1 in commission
- Shirase (AGB-5003) polar icebreaker
  - Builder: Japan
  - Displacement: 20,000 tons
  - Operator: Japan Maritime Self-Defense Force

==== Polar patrol icebreakers ====
- NoCGV Svalbard polar icebreaker/offshore patrol vessel
  - Builder: Norway
  - Displacement: 6,500 tons
  - Operator: Royal Norwegian Navy

==== Polar research icebreakers ====
- ARA Almirante Irízar polar research icebreaker
  - Builder: Finland
  - Displacement: 14,899 tons
  - Operator: Argentine Navy

===== Polar oceanographic research icebreakers =====
- BIO Hespérides polar oceanographic research icebreaker
  - Builder: Spain
  - Displacement: 2750 tons
  - Operator: Spanish Navy

=== Icebreaking tugs ===
- Bay-class icebreaking tug (WTGB-101)
  - Builder: United States
  - Displacement: 660 tons
  - Operator: United States Coast Guard: 9 in commission

== Logistical support ships ==
- Etna-class Logistics Support Vessel
  - Builder: Italy
  - Displacement: 13,400 tons
  - Operator:
    - Marina Militare: 1 in service
    - Hellenic Navy: 1 in service
- Honqui-class coastal freighter
  - Builder: China
  - Displacement: 1,950 tons
  - Operator: People's Liberation Army Navy: 7 in service
- Qiongsha-class cargo ship
  - Builder: China
  - Displacement: 2,150 tons
  - Operator: People's Liberation Army Navy: 1 in service
- HNoMS Valkyrien support ship
  - Builder: Norway
  - Displacement: 3,000 tons
  - Operator: Royal Norwegian Navy: 1 in service
- Vulcano-class Logistics Support Ship
  - Builder: Italy
  - Displacement: 23,500 tons
  - Operator: Marina Militare: 1 on building
- Yüzbaşı Güngör Durmuş class Logistics Support Ship
  - Builder: Turkey
  - Displacement: 8,477 tons
  - Operator: Turkish Navy: 2 in service

=== Multi role vessels ===
- HMNZS Canterbury multi role vessel
  - Builder: Netherlands / Australia
  - Displacement: 9,000 tons
  - Operator: Royal New Zealand Navy

=== General cargo ships ===
- Cape Ann-class general cargo ship (AK-5009)
  - Builder: United States
  - Displacement: 20,110 tons
  - Operator: United States Navy: 4 in commission
- Cape Breton-class general cargo ship (AK-5056)
  - Builder: United States
  - Displacement: 21,000 tons
  - Operator: United States Navy: 4 in commission
- Cape Girardeau-class container/bulk cargo ship (AK-2039)
  - Builder: United States
  - Displacement: 32,000 tons
  - Operator: United States Navy: 2 in commission
- Cape John-class general cargo ship (AK-5022)
  - Builder: United States
  - Displacement: 23,000 tons
  - Operator: United States Navy: 4 in commission
- Costa Sur-class container/general cargo ship
  - Builder: Argentina
  - Displacement: 10,894 tons
  - Operator: Argentine Navy: 3 in service

=== Container ships ===
- MV Asterix container ship
  - Builder: Germany
  - Operator: Royal Canadian Navy
- Page class container ship (AKR-4496)
  - Builder: United States
  - Displacement: 74,500 tons
  - Operator: United States Navy: 2 in commission

=== Prepositioning ships ===
- 1st Lt Harry L. Martin Marine Corps prepositioning ship (AK-3015)
  - Builder: Germany
  - Displacement: 51,531 tons
  - Operator: United States Navy
- 2nd Lieutenant John P. Bobo-class Marine Corps prepositioning ship (AK-3008)
  - Builder: United States
  - Displacement: 46,000 tons
  - Operator: United States Navy: 5 in commission
- Gordon-class army prepositioning ship (AKR-296)
  - Builder: Denmark / United States
  - Displacement: 65,000 tons
  - Operator: United States Navy: 2 in commission
- Corporal Louis J. Hauge Jr.-class Marine Corps prepositioning ship (AK-3000)
  - Builder: United States
  - Displacement: 44,000 tons
  - Operator: United States Navy: 5 in commission
- Sergeant Matej Kocak-class Marine Corps prepositioning ship (AK-3005)
  - Builder: United States
  - Displacement: 51,612 tons
  - Operator: United States Navy: 3 in commission
- LCPL Roy M. Wheat Marine Corps prepositioning ship (AK-3016)
  - Builder: Soviet Union / United States
  - Displacement: 50,570 tons
  - Operator: United States Navy
- Shughart-class army prepositioning ship (AKR-295)
  - Builder: Denmark
  - Displacement: 54,300 tons
  - Operator: United States Navy: 2 in commission

=== Vehicle ships ===
- Algol-class fast vehicle cargo ship (AKR 287)
  - Builder: Netherlands
  - Displacement: 55,355 tons
  - Operator: United States Navy: 8 in commission
- Bob Hope-class army vehicle prepositioning ship (AKR-300)
  - Builder: United States
  - Displacement: 62,000 tons
  - Operator: United States Navy: 7 in commission
- Cape Ducato-class roll-on/roll-off vehicle cargo ship (AKR-5051)
  - Builder: France / Sweden
  - Displacement: 34,790 tons
  - Operator: United States Navy: 5 in commission
- Cape Hudson-class vehicle cargo ship (AKR-5066)
  - Builder: Japan / Norway
  - Displacement: 51,000 tons
  - Operator: United States Navy: 3 in commission
- Cape Island-class vehicle cargo ship (AKR-10)
  - Builder: United States
  - Displacement: 33,900 tons
  - Operator: United States Navy: 4 in commission
- Cape Knox-class vehicle cargo ship (AKR-5082)
  - Builder: Japan
  - Displacement: 29,200 tons
  - Operator: United States Navy: 2 in commission
- Cape Lambert-class vehicle cargo ship (AKR-5077)
  - Builder: United States
  - Displacement: 30,360 tons
  - Operator: United States Navy: 2 in commission
- Cape Rise-class vehicle cargo ship (AKR-9678)
  - Builder: United States
  - Displacement: 32,000 tons
  - Operator: United States Navy: 3 in commission
- Cape Texas-class vehicle cargo ship (AKR-112)
  - Builder: United States
  - Displacement: 24,550 tons
  - Operator: United States Navy: 3 in commission
- Cape Vincent-class vehicle cargo ship (AKR-9666)
  - Builder: United States
  - Displacement: 28,200 tons
  - Operator: United States Navy: 2 in commission
- Cape Washington-class vehicle cargo ship (AKR-9961)
  - Builder: Poland
  - Displacement: 53,600 tons
  - Operator: United States Navy: 2 in commission
- General Frank S. Besson-class Logistics Support Vessel (LSV-1)
  - Builder: United States
  - Displacement: 4,199 long tons
  - Operator:
    - United States Navy: 8 in commission
    - Philippine Navy: 2 in commission
- GySgt Fred W. Stockham army prepositioning ship (AK-3017)
  - Builder: Denmark
  - Displacement: 55,500 tons
  - Operator: United States Navy
- Round Table-class Landing Ship Logistic
  - Builder: United Kingdom
  - Displacement: 6,000 to 8,751 tons
  - Operator: Brazilian Navy: 2 in service
- LTC Calvin P. Titus-class container/vehicle cargo ship (AK-5089)
  - Builder: United States
  - Displacement: 48,000 tons
  - Operator: United States Navy: 3 in commission
- Watson-class army prepositioning ship (AKR-310)
  - Builder: United States
  - Displacement: 62,600 tons
  - Operator: United States Navy: 8 in commission

=== Aviation logistics ships ===
- Wright-class aviation logistics ship (T-AVB-3)
  - Builder: United States
  - Displacement: 23,800 tons
  - Operator: United States Navy: 2 in commission

=== Barge Carrier ships ===
- Cape Fear-class barge carrier (AK-5061)
  - Builder: United States
  - Displacement: 44,250 tons
  - Operator: United States Navy: 2 in commission
- Cape Flattery-class barge carrier (AK-5070)
  - Builder: United States
  - Displacement: 62,300 tons
  - Operator: United States Navy: 2 in commission

=== Troop ships ===
- Qiongsha-class troop ship
  - Builder: China
  - Displacement: 2,150 tons
  - Operator: People's Liberation Army Navy: 4 in service
- TCG İskenderun (A-1600) troop transport ship
  - Builder: Turkey
  - Displacement: 7,948 tons
  - Operator: Turkish Navy: 1 in service

=== Polar logistics ships ===
- Green Wave polar logistics ship (AK-2050)
  - Builder: West Germany
  - Displacement: 9,500 tons
  - Operator: United States Navy

== Rescue and salvage ships ==
=== Heavy-lift ships ===
- Type 633 class heavy-lift ship
  - Builder: China
  - Operator: People's Liberation Army Navy: 1 in service

=== Salvage ships ===
- Type 922 class rescue and salvage ship
  - Builder: China
  - Displacement: 3,400 tons
  - Operator: People's Liberation Army Navy: 1 in service
- Type 922II (Dalang class) rescue and salvage ship
  - Builder: China
  - Displacement: 4,450 tons
  - Operator: People's Liberation Army Navy: 1 in service
- Type 922III (Dalang II class) rescue and salvage ship
  - Builder: China
  - Operator: People's Liberation Army Navy: 1 in service
- Type 922IIIA (Dalang II class) rescue and salvage ship
  - Builder: China
  - Operator: People's Liberation Army Navy: 3 in service
- Işın class rescue and salvage ship
  - Builder: Turkey
  - Displacement: 2,400 tons
  - Operator: Turkish Navy: 2in service

==== Salvage tugs ====
- Abeille Flandre-class large salvage tug
  - Displacement: 3,800 tons
  - Operator: French Navy: 2 in service
- Daozha-class salvage tug
  - Builder: China
  - Displacement: 4,000 tons
  - Operator: People's Liberation Army Navy: 1 in service
- Fehmarn-class (Type 720) salvage tug
  - Builder: Germany
  - Displacement: 1,310 tons
  - Operator: German Navy
- Ingul-class salvage tug (Project 1452/1453)
  - Builder: Soviet Union
  - Displacement: 4,000 tons
  - Operator: Russian Navy: 4 in service
- Neftegaz-class salvage tug (Project B-92)
  - Builder: Poland
  - Displacement: 4,000 tons
  - Operator: Russian Navy: 3 in service
- Prut-class salvage tug (Project 527M)
  - Builder: Soviet Union
  - Displacement: 3,330 tons
  - Operator: Russian Navy: 2 in service
- Safeguard-class salvage tug (ARS-50)
  - Builder: United States
  - Displacement: 3,300 tons
  - Operator: United States Navy: 4 in commission
- Sliva-class salvage tug (Project 712)
  - Builder: Finland
  - Displacement: 3,000 tons
  - Operator: Russian Navy: 3 in service
- Tuozhong-class salvage tug
  - Builder: China
  - Displacement: 3,600 tons
  - Operator: People's Liberation Army Navy: 4 in service

=== Fire tugs ===
- Fire-class fireboat
  - Builder: Canada
  - Displacement: 140 tons
  - Operator: Royal Canadian Navy: 1 in service
- Iva-class fire rescue tug (Project B-99)
  - Builder: Poland
  - Displacement: 2,300 tons
  - Operator: Russian Navy: 4 in service
- Katun-class fire tug (Project 1893/1993)
  - Builder: Soviet Union
  - Displacement: 1,200 tons
  - Operator: Russian Navy: 13 in service

=== Search and Rescue Vessels ===
- San Juan-class Search and Rescue Vessel
  - Builder: Australia
  - Displacement: 540 tons
  - Operator: Philippine Coast Guard: 4 in service
- Ilocos Norte class Search and Rescue Vessel
  - Builder: Australia
  - Displacement: 120 tons
  - Operator: Philippine Coast Guard: 4 in service
- Type 917 class rescue ship
  - Builder: China
  - Operator: People's Liberation Army Navy: 2 in service

=== Submarine Rescue ships ===
- Alagez submarine salvage and rescue ship (Project 537)
  - Displacement: 14,300 tons
  - Operator: Russian Navy
- TCG Alemdar submarine rescue ship
  - Builder: Turkey
  - Displacement: 4,200 tons
  - Operator: Turkish Navy
- Amatista Mod-class submarine rescue ship
  - Builder: Spain
  - Displacement: 1,860 tons
  - Operator: Spanish Navy: 1 in service
- HSwMS Belos submarine rescue ship.
  - Operator: Swedish Navy
- Anteo submarine rescue ship
  - Builder: Italy
  - Displacement: 3,874 tons
  - Operator: Marina Militare
- Cheonghaejin class submarine rescue ship
  - Builder: South Korea
  - Displacement: 4,300 tons
  - Operator: Republic of Korea Navy: 1 in service
- JS Chihaya submarine rescue ship
  - Builder: Japan
  - Displacement: 7,011 tons
  - Operator: Japan Maritime Self-Defense Force
- JS Chiyoda submarine rescue ship
  - Builder: Japan
  - Displacement: 7,214 tons
  - Operator: Japan Maritime Self-Defense Force
- Type 930 (Hudong class) submarine rescue ship
  - Builder: China
  - Displacement: 2,500 tons
  - Operator: People's Liberation Army Navy: 1 in service
- Type 946 (Dazhou class) submarine rescue ship
  - Builder: China
  - Displacement: 1,100 tons
  - Operator: People's Liberation Army Navy: 2 in service
- Type 946A (Dadong class) submarine rescue ship
  - Builder: China
  - Displacement: 1,500 tons
  - Operator: People's Liberation Army Navy: 1 in service

== Torpedo recovery vessels ==
- INS Astradharani torpedo launch and recovery vessel
  - Builder: India
  - Displacement: 650 tons
  - Operator: Indian Navy
- Cape Flattery-class torpedo trials craft
  - Builder: United States
  - Displacement: 1190 tons
  - Operator: United States Navy: 2 in service
- Type 803 class torpedo retriever
  - Builder: China
  - Displacement: 94.67 tons
  - Operator: People's Liberation Army Navy
- Type 906 class torpedo trials craft
  - Builder: China
  - Displacement: 2,300 tons
  - Operator: People's Liberation Army Navy: 1 in service
- Type 907A class torpedo trials craft
  - Builder: China
  - Displacement: 615 tons
  - Operator: People's Liberation Army Navy: 1 in service
- Type 917 class torpedo retriever
  - Builder: China
  - Displacement: 742.5 tons
  - Operator: People's Liberation Army Navy: 7 in service

== Pollution control ships ==
- Bottsand-class (Type 738) oil recovery ship
  - Builder: Germany
  - Displacement: 650 tons
  - Operator: German Navy: 2 in service
- Halli pollution control ship
  - Builder: Finland
  - Displacement: 2,100 tons
  - Operator: Finnish Navy
- Hylje pollution control ship
  - Builder: Finland
  - Displacement: 1,400 tons
  - Operator: Finnish Navy
- Louhi pollution control ship
  - Builder: Finland
  - Displacement: 3,450 tons
  - Operator: Finnish Navy

== Tugs ==
- Glen-class tug
  - Builder: Canada
  - Displacement: 259 tons
  - Operator: Royal Canadian Navy: 5 in service
- Habagat-class MT Tug (TB-271)
  - Builder: Philippines
  - Displacement: unknown
  - Operator: Philippine Coast Guard
- IRS-class tug
  - Builder: India
  - Displacement: 472 tons
  - Operator: Indian Navy: 3 in service

=== Anchor tugs ===
- Chieftain anchor handling tug supply vessel
  - Builder: Germany
  - Displacement: 2,028 tons
  - Operator: Royal Norwegian Navy: 1 in service

=== Supply tugs ===
- Rari-class supply tug
  - Displacement: 1,550 tons
  - Operator: French Navy: 2 in service

=== Harbour tugs ===
- Capstan-class (65 Foot) small harbour tug (WYTL-65601)
  - Builder: United States
  - Displacement: 72 tons
  - Operator: United States Coast Guard: 10 in commission
- Lütje Hörn-class (Type 725) harbour tug
  - Builder: Germany
  - Operator: German Navy: 6 in service
- Porto-class harbour tug
  - Builder: Italy
  - Displacement: 412 tons
  - Operator: Marina Militare: 11 in service
- Sleipner-class harbour tug
  - Builder: Norway
  - Displacement: 300 tons
  - Operator: Royal Norwegian Navy: 2 in service
- Sylt-class (Type 724) large harbour tug
  - Builder: Germany
  - Operator: German Navy: 2 in service
- Ville-class harbour tug
  - Builder: Canada
  - Displacement: 46 tons
  - Operator: Royal Canadian Navy: 5 in service
- Wustrow-class (Type 414) harbour tug
  - Builder: Germany
  - Operator: German Navy: 2 in service

=== Coastal tugs ===
- Belier-class coastal tug
  - Displacement: 800 tons
  - Operator: French Navy: 3 in service
- Chamois-class coastal tug and logistical support ship
  - Displacement: 505 tons
  - Operator: French Navy: 1 in service

=== Offshore tugs ===
- Abnaki class fleet ocean tug
  - Builder: United States
  - Displacement: 1,589 tons
  - Operators:
    - Argentine Navy: 2 in service
    - Ecuadorian Navy: 1 in service
- Atlante-class ocean tug
  - Builder: Italy
  - Displacement: 750 tons
  - Operator: Marina Militare: 2 in service
- Barentshav-class offshore patrol vessel
  - Builder: Norway
  - Displacement: 3,200 tons
  - Operator: Royal Norwegian Navy: 3 in commission
- Ciclope-class ocean tug
  - Builder: Italy
  - Displacement: 660 tons
  - Operator: Marina Militare: 6 in service
- INS Gaj offshore tug
  - Builder: India
  - Displacement: 560 tons
  - Operator: Indian Navy
- Goliat-class ocean tug (Project 733)
  - Builder: Soviet Union
  - Displacement: 890 tons
  - Operator: Russian Navy: 25 in service
- Helgoland-class large sea-going tug
  - Builder: Germany
  - Operators:
    - German Navy: 1 in service
    - National Navy of Uruguay: 1 in service
- MB-330 class ocean tug
  - Builder: Singapore
  - Displacement: 1,180 tons
  - Operator: Russian Navy: 1 in service
- Powhatan class fleet ocean tug (ATF 168)
  - Builder: United States
  - Displacement: 2,260 tons
  - Operator: United States Navy: 5 in commission
- Roslavl-class ocean tug (Project A-202)
  - Builder: Soviet Union / China
  - Displacement: 625 tons
  - Operators:
    - Russian Navy: 11 in service
    - People's Liberation Army Navy: 4 in service
- Sorum-class fleet seagoing tug (Project 745)
  - Builder: Soviet Union
  - Displacement: 1,656 tons
  - Operator: Russian Navy: 22 in service
- Tenace-class ocean tug
  - Displacement: 1,400 tons
  - Operator: French Navy: 2 in service
- Type 802 Gromovoy class ocean tug
  - Builder: Soviet Union / China
  - Displacement: 890 tons
  - Operator: People's Liberation Army Navy: 17 in service
- Type 837 Hujiu class ocean tug
  - Builder: China
  - Displacement: 750 tons
  - Operator: People's Liberation Army Navy: 8 in service
- Wangerooge-class seagoing tug
  - Builder: Germany
  - Displacement: 798 tons
  - Operators:
    - German Navy: 2 in service
    - National Navy of Uruguay: 1 in service

=== Fleet tugs ===
- Dinghai-class fleet tug
  - Builder: China
  - Displacement: 1,470 tons
  - Operator: People's Liberation Army Navy: 2 in service
- Goryn-class fleet tug (Project 563)
  - Builder: Finland
  - Displacement: 2,200 tons
  - Operator: Russian Navy: 9 in service

== Training ships ==
See Category:Training ships

- Amerigo Vespucci Tall ship
  - Builder: Italy
  - Displacement: 4,146 tons
  - Operator: Marina Militare: 1 in service
- RFA Argus Aviation training ship
  - Builder United Kingdom
  - Displacement 28,081 tons
  - Operator: Royal Navy, ( Royal Fleet Auxiliary), 1 in service
- Arung Samudera Tall ship
  - Operator: Indonesian Navy
- Capitán Miranda Tall ship
  - Builder: Spain
  - Displacement: 852 tons
  - Operator: National Navy of Uruguay
- Cisne Branco Tall ship
  - Builder: Netherlands
  - Displacement: 1,038 tons
  - Operator: Brazilian Navy
- UAM Creoula Tall ship
  - Builder: Portugal
  - Displacement: 1,321 tons
  - Operator: Portuguese Navy
- KRI Dewaruci Tall ship
  - Builder: Germany
  - Operator: Indonesian Navy
- Fabian Wrede-class training ship
  - Builder: Finland
  - Displacement: 65 tons
  - Operator: Finnish Navy: 3 in service
- USCGC Eagle Tall ship
  - Builder: Germany
  - Displacement: 1,813 tons
  - Operator: United States Coast Guard
- NRP Sagres Tall ship
  - Builder: Blohm & Voss Germany
  - Displacement: 1,755 long tons (1,783 tons)
  - Operator: Portuguese Navy
  - Sister ship to USCGC Eagle
- Mircea Tall ship
  - Builder: Blohm & Voss Germany
  - Operator: Romanian Naval Forces
  - Sister ship to USCGC Eagle and NRP Sagres
- Gorch Fock Tall ship
  - Builder: Germany
  - Displacement: 2,006 tons
  - Operator: German Navy
  - Sister ship to USCGC Eagle, NRP Sagres, and Mircea
- ARC Gloria Tall ship
  - Builder: Spain
  - Displacement: 1,300 tons
  - Operator: Colombian National Navy
- BAE Guayas Tall ship
  - Builder: Spain
  - Displacement: 1,300 tons
  - Operator: Ecuadorian Navy
  - Sister ship to ARC Gloria
- Simón Bolívar Tall ship
  - Builder: Spain
  - Displacement: 1,260 tons
  - Operator: Bolivarian Navy of Venezuela
  - Sister ship to ARC Gloria and BAE Guayas
- ARM Cuauhtémoc Tall ship
  - Builder: Spain
  - Displacement: 1,800 tons
  - Operator: Mexican Navy
  - Sister ship to ARC Gloria, BAE Guayas, and Simón Bolívar
- Hiuchi-class training support ship
  - Builder: Japan
  - Displacement: 1,000 tons
  - Operator: Japan Maritime Self-Defense Force: 5 in service
- HNoMS Horten training ship
  - Builder: Norway
  - Displacement: 2,535 tons
  - Operator: Royal Norwegian Navy
- Intermares training ship
  - Builder: Spain
  - Displacement: 3,200 tons
  - Operator: Spanish Navy
- Juan Sebastián de Elcano Tall ship
  - Builder: Spain
  - Displacement: 3,673 tons
  - Operator: Spanish Navy
- Esmeralda Tall ship
  - Builder: Spain
  - Displacement: 3,754 tons
  - Operator: Chilean Navy
  - Sister ship to Juan Sebastián de Elcano
- ARA Libertad Tall ship
  - Builder: Argentina
  - Displacement: 3,765 tons
  - Operator: Argentine Navy
- Mhadei-class training sailboat
  - Builder: India
  - Displacement: 23 tons
  - Operator: Indian Navy: 2 in service
- HMCS Oriole training sailboat
  - Builder: United States
  - Displacement: 93 tons
  - Operator: Royal Canadian Navy
- Palinuro Tall ship
  - Builder: France
  - Displacement: 1,341 tons
  - Operator: Marina Militare: 1 in service
- Shiyan training ship
  - Displacement: 6,000 tons
  - Operator: People's Liberation Army Navy
- INS Tarangini Tall ship
  - Builder: India
  - Displacement: 513 tons
  - Operator: Indian Navy
- INS Sudarshini Tall ship
  - Builder: India
  - Displacement: 513 tons
  - Operator: Indian Navy
  - Sister ship to INS Tarangini
- INS Tir training ship
  - Builder: India
  - Displacement: 3,200 tons
  - Operator: Indian Navy
- Type 82 training ship
  - Builder: United Kingdom
  - Displacement: 6,000 tons
  - Operator: Royal Navy 1 in service
- Type 679 (Zheng He-class) (NATO Daxing-class) training ship
  - Builder: China
  - Displacement: 5,548 tons
  - Operator: People's Liberation Army Navy
- Type 680 (Qi Jiguang-class) training ship
  - Builder: China
  - Displacement: 9,000 tons
  - Operator: People's Liberation Army Navy
- Type 0891A (Shichang-class) training ship
  - Builder: China
  - Displacement: 9,700 tons
  - Operator: People's Liberation Army Navy
- BAP Unión Tall ship
  - Builder: Spain / Peru
  - Displacement: 3,200 tons
  - Operator: Peruvian Navy
- Yanxi-class training ship
  - Builder: China
  - Displacement: 1,200 tons
  - Operator: People's Liberation Army Navy
- Cezayirli Gazi Hasan class
  - Builder: Turkey
  - Displacement: 2,940 tons
  - Operator: Turkish Navy: 1 in service

== Yachts ==
- Argo (MEN209) Presidential Yacht
  - Builder: Italy
  - Displacement: 64.47 tons
  - Operator: Marina Militare
- HDMY Dannebrog Royal Yacht
  - Builder: Denmark
  - Displacement: 1,295 tons
  - Operator: Royal Danish Navy
- ARA Fortuna III racing yacht
  - Builder: Argentina
  - Displacement: 15.5 tons
  - Operator: Argentine Navy
- JS Hashidate accommodation yacht
  - Builder: Japan
  - Displacement: 490 tons
  - Operator: Japan Maritime Self-Defense Force
- HNoMY Norge Royal Yacht
  - Builder: United Kingdom
  - Displacement: 1,628 tons
  - Operator: Royal Norwegian Navy
- MV Savarona class (TCG MV Savarona) Modernized and retrofitted as state yacht
  - Builder: Turkey
  - Displacement: 4,646 tonnes
  - Operator: Turkish Navy: 1 in service

== See also ==
- List of naval ship classes in service
- List of submarine classes in service
