= Type 646 water tanker =

Chinese tanker ship

History

PRC

General characteristics
- Displacement: 670 long tons (680 t)
- Length: 38 m (124 ft 8 in)
- Beam: 8.2 m (26 ft 11 in)
- Draught: 2.3 m (7 ft 7 in)
- Propulsion: 1 × marine diesel engines with single shaft @ 300 hp (224 kW)
- Speed: 10 knots (19 km/h; 12 mph)
- Complement: 21

Type 646 water tanker (AWT) is a type of naval auxiliary ship currently in service with the People's Liberation Army Navy (PLAN). Type 646 series ships in PLAN service are designated by a combination of two Chinese characters followed by three-digit number. The second Chinese character is Shui (水), meaning water, because these ships are classified either as oil and water tankers. The first Chinese character denotes which fleet the ship is service with, with East (Dong, 东) for East Sea Fleet, North (Bei, 北) for North Sea Fleet, and South (Nan, 南) for South Sea Fleet. However, the pennant numbers may have changed due to the change of Chinese naval ships naming convention. Two have been identified as still in active service as mid 2015:

Type	Pennant #	Status	Fleet
646	Dong-Shui 646	Active	East Sea Fleet
646	Dong-Shui 647	Active	East Sea Fleet
