= Beituo 715-class tug =

Chinese naval auxiliary ship class

Class overview
- Operators: People's Liberation Army Navy

General characteristics
- Class & type: Beituo 715
- Type: Tugboat
- Tonnage: 211 long tons (214 t)
- Displacement: 166 long tons (169 t)
- Length: 27.03 m (88 ft 8 in)
- Beam: 6.8 m (22 ft 4 in)
- Draught: 2.2 m (7 ft 3 in)
- Depth: 3.2 m (10 ft 6 in)
- Decks: 1
- Propulsion: 1 × 8170 marine diesel engine, 500 hp (373 kW); 1 × 6134 marine diesel engine, 160 hp (119 kW)
- Electronic warfare & decoys: None
- Armament: Unarmed
- Aircraft carried: None
- Aviation facilities: None

Beituo 715 class tug is a class of little known naval auxiliary ship currently in service with the People's Liberation Army Navy (PLAN). The name of this class is after the first unit commissioned, with the exact type still remains unknown, and since the commission of the first unit in 1980, a total of seven of this class have been confirmed in active service as of mid-2010s. This class of tug is a single hull and single deck design, with deck covers.

Beituo 715 class series ships in PLAN service are designated by a combination of two Chinese characters followed by three-digit number. The second Chinese character is Tuo (拖), meaning tug in Chinese, because these ships are classified as tugboats. The first Chinese character denotes which fleet the ship is service with, with East (Dong, 东) for East Sea Fleet, North (Bei, 北) for North Sea Fleet, and South (Nan, 南) for South Sea Fleet. However, the pennant numbers may have changed due to the change of Chinese naval ships naming convention.

Class	Pennant #	Status	Fleet
Beituo 715 class	Bei-Tuo 715	Active	North Sea Fleet
Beituo 715 class	Dong-Tuo 838	Active	East Sea Fleet
Beituo 715 class	Dong-Tuo 846	Active	East Sea Fleet
Beituo 715 class	Dong-Tuo 848	Active	East Sea Fleet
Beituo 715 class	Dong-Tuo 859	Active	East Sea Fleet
Beituo 715 class	Nan-Tuo 146	Active	South Sea Fleet
Beituo 715 class	Nan-Tuo 401	Active	South Sea Fleet
