= Type 631 tanker =

Class of Chinese naval tankers

Class overview
- Name: Type 631
- Operators: People's Liberation Army Navy
- Completed: 6
- Active: 6

General characteristics
- Displacement: 2,300 long tons (2,300 t)
- Length: 60 m (196 ft 10 in)
- Beam: 10 m (32 ft 10 in)
- Draught: 3.3 m (10 ft 10 in)
- Propulsion: 2 × marine diesel engines, 7,200 hp (5,369 kW); 2 shafts
- Speed: 10 knots (19 km/h; 12 mph)
- Complement: 30
- Sensors & processing systems: Navigation radar
- Electronic warfare & decoys: None
- Armament: None
- Armour: None
- Aircraft carried: None
- Aviation facilities: None

The Type 631 tanker is a type of naval auxiliary ship currently in service with the People's Liberation Army Navy (PLAN), and has received NATO reporting name Fuchang class. Originally designed as a type that is capable of transport both water and oil, but only the oil tanker version entered service with PLAN (as of early 2020s).

Type 631 tankers in PLAN service are designated by a combination of two Chinese characters followed by a three-digit number. The second Chinese character is You (油), meaning oil in Chinese, because these ships are classified as oilers. The first Chinese character denotes which fleet the ship is service with, with East (Dong, 东) for East Sea Fleet, North (Bei, 北) for North Sea Fleet, and South (Nan, 南) for South Sea Fleet. However, the pennant numbers are subject to change due to changes of Chinese naval ships naming convention, or when units are transferred to different fleets. Type 631 can be easily distinguished from other transport oilers by its transfer stations amid ship that enables it to carry out underway replenishment missions. Another visual cue of this class is that from the bow to the midsection of the ship, there are three levels of freeboard, while all other Chinese tanker has a smooth curvy transition. Specification:

- Displacement: 2,300 long tons (2,300 t)
- Length: 60 m (196 ft 10 in)
- Beam: 10 m (32 ft 10 in)
- Draft: 3.3 m (10 ft 10 in)
- Propulsion: 2 marine diesel engines @ 7,200 hp (5,400 kW) 2 shafts
- Speed: 10 knots (19 km/h; 12 mph)
- Complement: 30

Type	NATO designation	Pennant No.	Name (English)	Name (Han 中文)	Commissioned	Displacement	Fleet	Status
Type 631 transport oil tanker (AOT)	Fuchang class	Bei-You 565	North Oil 565	北油 565	?	? t	North Sea Fleets	Active
Type 631 transport oil tanker (AOT)	Fuchang class	Dong-You 631	East Oil 631	东油 631	?	? t	East Sea Fleet	Active
Type 631 transport oil tanker (AOT)	Fuchang class	Dong-You 641	East Oil 641	东油 641	?	? t	East Sea Fleet	Active
Type 631 transport oil tanker (AOT)	Fuchang class	Nan-You 957	South Oil 957	南油 957	?	? t	South Sea Fleet	Active
Type 631 transport oil tanker (AOT)	Fuchang class	Nan-You 959	South Oil 959	南油 959	?	? t	South Sea Fleet	Active
Type 631 transport oil tanker (AOT)	Fuchang class	Nan-You 973	South Oil 973	南油 973	?	? t	South Sea Fleet	Active
