= Type 632 tanker =

History

PRC
- Name: Fulin
- Builder: Hudong-Zhonghua Shipbuilding
- Completed: 1972
- Acquired: 1972
- Commissioned: 1972
- Maiden voyage: 1972
- In service: 1972 onward
- Fate: Being retired
- Status: In reserve

General characteristics
- Displacement: 2,200 long tons (2,200 t)
- Length: 66 m (216 ft 6 in)
- Beam: 10 m (32 ft 10 in)
- Draught: 4 m (13 ft 1 in)
- Propulsion: 1 × marine diesel engine, 600 hp (447 kW); 1 shaft
- Speed: 10 knots (19 km/h; 12 mph)
- Range: 1,500 nmi (2,800 km; 1,700 mi) at 8 kn (15 km/h; 9.2 mph)
- Complement: 30
- Sensors & processing systems: Type 756 or Fine Curve radar
- Armament: 2 x twin 25 mm (0.98 in)

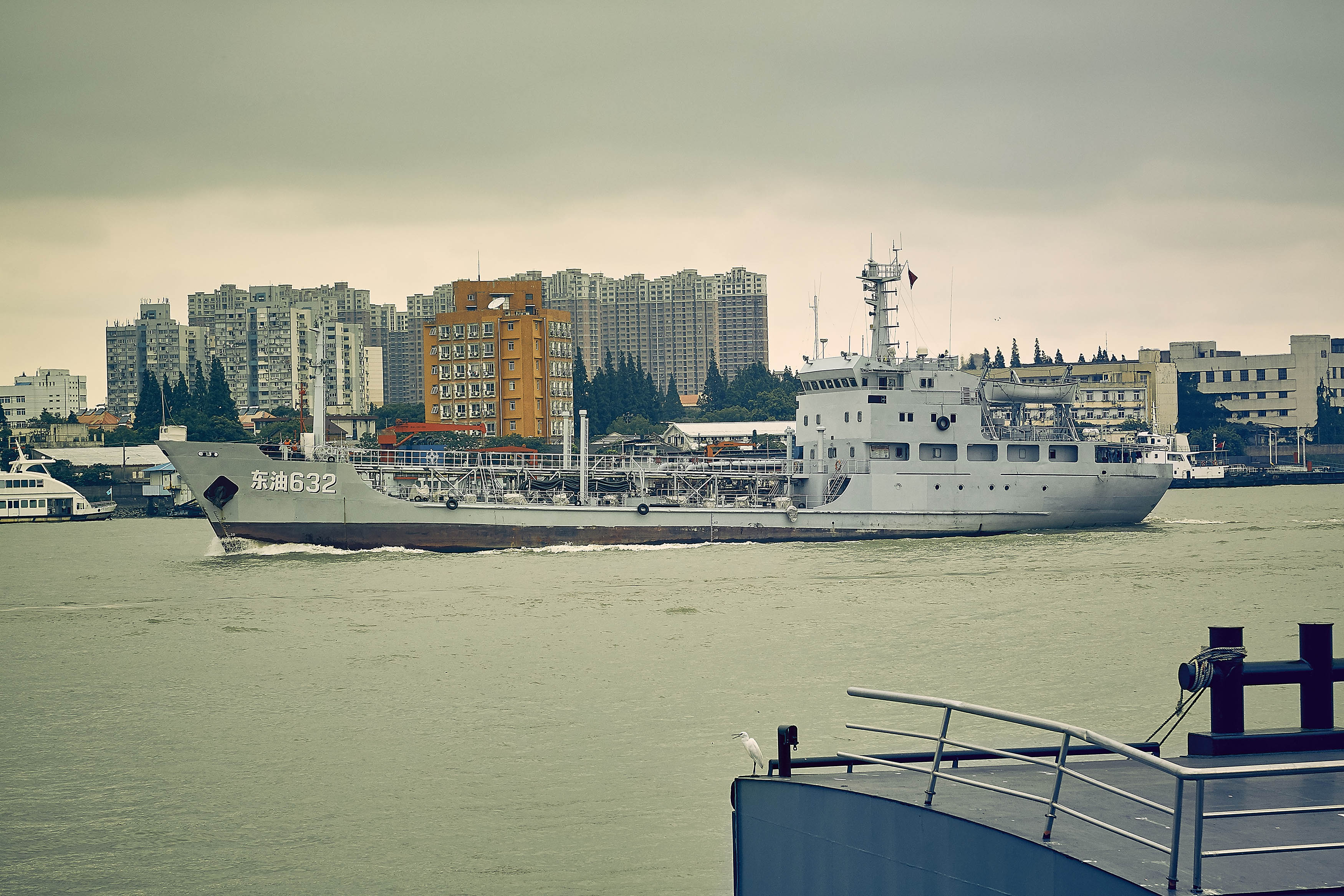
Chinese Type 632 Tanker arriving in Shanghai, China

Type 632 tanker is a type of naval auxiliary ship currently in service with the People's Republic of China Navy (PLAN). Designed as a type that is capable of transporting both water and oil, these ships entered service from 1972 onward. Type 632 tanker has received the NATO reporting name as Fulin class. These ships had all retired by the late 2010s.

Type 632 tankers in PLAN service are designated by a combination of two Chinese characters followed by a three-digit number. The second Chinese character is You (油), meaning oil in Chinese, or Shui (水), meaning water, because these ships are classified either as oil or water tankers. The first Chinese character denotes which fleet the ship is in service with, with East (Dong, 东) for East Sea Fleet, North (Bei, 北) for North Sea Fleet, and South (Nan, 南) for South Sea Fleet. However, the pennant numbers may have changed due to the change in Chinese naval ships naming convention.

Type	Pennant #	Builder	Commissioned	Status	Fleet
632	Bei -Shui 572	Hudong-Zhonghua Shipbuilding	1972 onward	Retired	North Sea Fleet
632	Bei-You 400	Hudong-Zhonghua Shipbuilding	1972 onward	Retired	North Sea Fleet
632	Bei-You 562	Hudong-Zhonghua Shipbuilding	1972 onward	Retired	North Sea Fleet
632	Dong-You 632	Hudong-Zhonghua Shipbuilding	1972 onward	Active	East Sea Fleet
632	Dong-You 634	Hudong-Zhonghua Shipbuilding	1972 onward	Active	East Sea Fleet
632	Dong-You 635	Hudong-Zhonghua Shipbuilding	1972 onward	Retired	East Sea Fleet
632	Dong-You 638	Hudong-Zhonghua Shipbuilding	1972 onward	Retired	East Sea Fleet
632	Dong-You 639	Hudong-Zhonghua Shipbuilding	1972 onward	Retired	East Sea Fleet
632	Dong-You 642	Hudong-Zhonghua Shipbuilding	1972 onward	Retired	East Sea Fleet
632	Nan-Shui 970	Hudong-Zhonghua Shipbuilding	1972 onward	Retired	South Sea Fleet
632	Nan-You 961	Hudong-Zhonghua Shipbuilding	1972 onward	Retired	South Sea Fleet
632	Nan-You 962	Hudong-Zhonghua Shipbuilding	1972 onward	Retired	South Sea Fleet
632	Nan-You 963	Hudong-Zhonghua Shipbuilding	1972 onward	Retired	South Sea Fleet
632	Nan-You 969	Hudong-Zhonghua Shipbuilding	1972 onward	Retired	South Sea Fleet
