= Beijun 204-class dredger =

Chinese naval auxiliary ship class

Class overview
- Operators: People's Liberation Army Navy

General characteristics
- Class & type: Beijun 204
- Electronic warfare & decoys: None
- Armament: Unarmed
- Aircraft carried: None
- Aviation facilities: None

Beijun 204 class dredger is a class of little known naval auxiliary ship currently in service with the People's Liberation Army Navy (PLAN). The name of this class is after the first unit commissioned, with the exact type still remains unknown, and only a single unit of this class have been confirmed in active service as of mid-2010s. In comparison to other dredger in Chinese military service, Beijun 204 class is also capable of performing floating pile driver missions with two piles it is equipped with, one on each side of the ship.

Beijun 204 class series ships in PLAN service are designated by a combination of two Chinese characters followed by three-digit number. The second Chinese character is Jun (浚), meaning dredge in Chinese, because these ships are classified as dredgers. The first Chinese character denotes which fleet the ship is service with, with East (Dong, 东) for East Sea Fleet, North (Bei, 北) for North Sea Fleet, and South (Nan, 南) for South Sea Fleet. However, the pennant numbers may have changed due to the change of Chinese naval ships naming convention.

| Class | Pennant # | Status | Fleet |
|---|---|---|---|
| Beijun 204 class | Bei-Jun 204 | Active | North Sea Fleet |
| Beijun 204 class | Bei-Jun 272 | Active | North Sea Fleet |
| Beijun 204 class | Nan-Jun 609 | Active | South Sea Fleet |

Dongjun 417 class dredger

Class overview
- Operators: People's Liberation Army Navy

General characteristics
- Class & type: Dong jun 417
- Electronic warfare & decoys: None
- Armament: Unarmed
- Aircraft carried: None
- Aviation facilities: None

Dongjun 417 class dredger is a class of little known naval auxiliary ship currently in service with the People's Liberation Army Navy (PLAN). The name of this class is after the first unit commissioned, with the exact type still remains unknown, and only a single unit of this class have been confirmed in active service as of mid-2010s.

Dongjun 417 class series ships in PLAN service are designated by a combination of two Chinese characters followed by three-digit number. The second Chinese character is Jun (浚), meaning dredge in Chinese, because these ships are classified as dredgers. The first Chinese character denotes which fleet the ship is service with, with East (Dong, 东) for East Sea Fleet, North (Bei, 北) for North Sea Fleet, and South (Nan, 南) for South Sea Fleet. However, the pennant numbers may have changed due to the change of Chinese naval ships naming convention.

| Class | Pennant # | Status | Fleet |
|---|---|---|---|
| Dongjun 417 class | Dong-Jun 417 | Active | East Sea Fleet |
