= Dongjun 417-class dredger =

Chinese naval auxiliary ship class

Class overview
- Operators: People's Liberation Army Navy

General characteristics
- Class & type: Dong jun 417
- Electronic warfare & decoys: None
- Armament: Unarmed
- Aircraft carried: None
- Aviation facilities: None

Dongjun 417 class dredger is a class of little known naval auxiliary ship currently in service with the People's Liberation Army Navy (PLAN). The name of this class is after the first unit commissioned, with the exact type still remains unknown, and only a single unit of this class has been confirmed in active service as of mid-2010s. Dongjun 417 class is a bucket dredger.

Dongjun 417 class series ships in PLAN service are designated by a combination of two Chinese characters followed by three-digit number. The second Chinese character is Jun (浚), meaning dredge in Chinese, because these ships are classified as dredgers. The first Chinese character denotes which fleet the ship is in service with, with East (Dong, 东) for East Sea Fleet, North (Bei, 北) for North Sea Fleet, and South (Nan, 南) for South Sea Fleet. However, the pennant numbers may have changed due to the change of Chinese naval ships naming convention.

| Class | Pennant # | Status | Fleet |
|---|---|---|---|
| Dongjun 417 class | Dong-Jun 417 | Active | East Sea Fleet |
