= Type 917 rescue ship =

Type of rescue and salvage ship

History

PRC
- Ordered: Late 2000s
- Awarded: Early 2010s
- Laid down: Early 2010s
- Launched: Early 2010s
- Completed: 2012
- Commissioned: 2012
- Status: Active

Class overview
- Operators: People's Liberation Army Navy
- Preceded by: Type 922IIIA rescue & salvage ship
- Built: 2012 onward

General characteristics
- Class & type: Dasan class
- Type: Rescue ship (ARS)
- Displacement: 550 t (540 long tons; 610 short tons)
- Length: 76 m (249 ft 4 in)
- Propulsion: Marine Diesel
- Sensors & processing systems: Navigation radar
- Electronic warfare & decoys: None
- Armament: 30 mm gun x 1
- Armour: None
- Aircraft carried: None
- Aviation facilities: None

Type 917 rescue ship (ARS) is a type of rescue and salvage ship developed by China for its People's Liberation Army Navy (PLAN). A total of two ships have entered service by mid-2014, and more units are planned. Type 917 is the first ship in PLAN to adopt a trimaran hull, and hence received NATO reporting name Dasan class, or 大三 in Chinese, which is short for Da-xing (大型) San-ti-chuan (三体船), meaning Large Trimaran.

The advantages of trimaran include stability and high speed in rough seas, and large deck area equivalent to a much larger ship, thus enabling a small ship to carry a helicopter that can only be carried by larger ships in traditional monohull design. Designed by the Multihull Ship Technology National Defense Important Academic Majors Laboratory (多体船技术国防重点学科实验室) of Harbin Engineering University, Type 917 carries a pair of newly designed rescue boats, with one on each side, stored in the davit position. The ship is equipped with a newly designed H/PJ14 single 30 mm gun controlled by electro-optical sensor. Type 917 series in PLAN service are designated by a combination of two Chinese characters followed by three-digit number. The second Chinese character is Jiu (救), meaning rescue in Chinese, because these ships are classified as rescue ship. The first Chinese character denotes which fleet the ship is in service with, with East (Dong, 东) for East Sea Fleet, North (Bei, 北) for North Sea Fleet, and South (Nan, 南) for South Sea Fleet. However, the pennant numbers may have changed due to the change of Chinese naval ships naming convention. Specification:

- Length: 76 meter
- Displacement: 550 ton

Type	Pennant #	Commissioned	Status	Fleet
917	Bei-Jiu 143	2012	Active	North Sea Fleet
917	Dong-Jiu 335	―	Active	East Sea Fleet
917	Nan-Jiu 511	―	Active	South Sea Fleet
