= Dongxiu 912-class repair dry dock =

Chinese naval auxiliary ship class

Class overview
- Operators: People's Liberation Army Navy

General characteristics
- Class & type: Dongxiu 912
- Electronic warfare & decoys: None
- Armament: Unarmed
- Aircraft carried: None
- Aviation facilities: None

The Dongxiu 912 class repair dry dock is a class of little known naval auxiliary ship currently in service with the People's Liberation Army Navy (PLAN). The name of this class is after the first unit commissioned, with the exact type still remains unknown, and only a single unit of this class have been confirmed in active service as of mid-2010s. Dongxiu 912 class repair dry dock is specifically developed to maintain / repair Type 037 corvette.

Dongxiu 912 class series ships in PLAN service are designated by a combination of two Chinese characters followed by three-digit number. The first Chinese character denotes which fleet the ship is service with, with East (Dong, 东) for East Sea Fleet, North (Bei, 北) for North Sea Fleet, and South (Nan, 南) for South Sea Fleet. The second Chinese character is rather unusual in the Chinese convention in that it is not Wu (坞, short for Chuan-Wu, meaning dry dock), as for most cases for Chinese dry docks in military service, but instead, the second Chinese character is Xiu (修), meaning repair in Chinese, because this dry dock is used for repair missions. However, the pennant numbers may have changed due to the change of Chinese naval ships naming convention.

Class	Pennant #	Status	Fleet
Dongxiu 912 class	Dong-Xiu 912	Active	East Sea Fleet
