= Type 620 tanker =

Naval axillary ship in the People's Republic of China Navy

History

PRC
- Name: Shengli
- Namesake: Victory
- Builder: Hudong-Zhonghua Shipbuilding
- Completed: 1980s
- Acquired: 1980s
- Commissioned: 1980s
- Maiden voyage: 1981
- In service: 1981 onward
- Fate: Being retired
- Status: In reserve

General characteristics
- Displacement: 4,940 long tons (5,020 t)
- Length: 101 m (331 ft 4 in)
- Beam: 31.8 m (104 ft 4 in)
- Draught: 5.7 m (18 ft 8 in)
- Propulsion: 1 × Type 6 ESDZ 43 marine diesel engines, 2,600 hp (1,939 kW); 1 shaft
- Speed: 15 knots (28 km/h; 17 mph)
- Range: 2,400 nmi (4,400 km; 2,800 mi) @ 14 kn
- Sensors & processing systems: Type 756 or Fine Curve radar
- Armament: 1 twin 25 mm (0.98 in) and; 1 twin 37 mm (1.5 in) guns

Type 620 tanker is a type of naval auxiliary ship currently in service with the People's Republic of China Navy (PLAN). Originally designed as a type that is capable of transport both water and oil, these ships entered service from 1981 onward for both military and civilian, but only the oiler version entered service with PLAN. Type 620 tanker has received NATO reporting name as Shengli class, meaning victory in Chinese. After transferred into reserves, these ships finally begun to retire in the early 2010s.

Type 620 tankers in PLAN service are designated by a combination of two Chinese characters followed by three-digit number. The second Chinese character is You (油), meaning oil in Chinese, because these ships are classified as oilers. The first Chinese character denotes which fleet the ship is service with, with East (Dong, 东) for East Sea Fleet, North (Bei, 北) for North Sea Fleet, and South (Nan, 南) for South Sea Fleet. However, the pennant numbers are subject to change due to the change of Chinese naval ships naming convention, or when units are transferred to different fleets. As of early 2020s, one of the two units identified remains active.

Type	Pennant #	Builder	Commissioned	Status	Fleet
620	Dong-You 620	Hudong-Zhonghua Shipbuilding	Early 1980s	Retired	East Sea Fleet
620	Dong-You 621	Hudong-Zhonghua Shipbuilding	Early 1980s	Active	East Sea Fleet
