= Dongjun 433-class dredger =

Chinese naval auxiliary ship

Class overview
- Operators: People's Liberation Army Navy

General characteristics
- Class & type: Dong jun 433
- Electronic warfare & decoys: None
- Armament: Unarmed
- Aircraft carried: None
- Aviation facilities: None

Dongjun 433 class dredger is a class of little known naval auxiliary ship currently in service with the People's Liberation Army Navy (PLAN). The name of this class is after the first unit commissioned, with the exact type still remains unknown, and only a single unit of this class have been confirmed in active service as of mid-2010s. Dongjun 434 is a bucket wheel dredger.

Dongjun 433 class series ships in PLAN service are designated by a combination of two Chinese characters followed by three-digit number. The second Chinese character is Jun (浚), meaning dredge in Chinese, because these ships are classified as dredgers. The first Chinese character denotes which fleet the ship is service with, with East (Dong, 东) for East Sea Fleet, North (Bei, 北) for North Sea Fleet, and South (Nan, 南) for South Sea Fleet. However, the pennant numbers may have changed due to the change of Chinese naval ships naming convention.

Class	Pennant #	Status	Fleet
Dongjun 433 class	Dong-Jun 433	Active	East Sea Fleet
