= Type 633 heavy-lift ship =

People's Liberation Army Navy vessel

Class overview
- Operators: People's Liberation Army Navy

General characteristics
- Electronic warfare & decoys: None
- Armament: Unarmed
- Aircraft carried: None
- Aviation facilities: None

Type 633 heavy-lift ship is a type of little known naval auxiliary ship currently in service with the People's Liberation Army Navy (PLAN). The name of this class is after the first unit commissioned; the exact type still remains unknown, and a total of three of this class have been confirmed in active service as of mid-2010s. Type 633 is mainly deployed in rescue and salvage operations.

Type 633 series in PLAN service are designated by a combination of two Chinese characters followed by three-digit number. The second Chinese character is Bo (驳), short for Bo-Chuan (驳船), meaning barge in Chinese, because these ships are classified as heavy-lift barges. The first Chinese character denotes which fleet the ship is in service with, with East (Dong, 东) for East Sea Fleet, North (Bei, 北) for North Sea Fleet, and South (Nan, 南) for South Sea Fleet. However, the pennant numbers may have changed due to the change of Chinese naval ships naming convention.

Type	Pennant #	Status	Fleet
633	Nan-Bo 46	Active	South Sea Fleet
