= 120 ton-class repair dry dock =

People's Liberation Army Navy ship

History

PRC
- Name: 809 Floating dock
- Namesake: Floating dock
- Builder: 4805th Factory
- Laid down: 1967
- Launched: June 27, 1970
- Commissioned: 1971
- In service: 1971

General characteristics
- Displacement: 518.17 long tons (526.49 t)
- Length: 41 m (134 ft 6 in)
- Beam: 12 m (39 ft 4 in)
- Draught: 1.41 m (4 ft 8 in)
- Depth: 7.1 m (23 ft 4 in)
- Propulsion: 2 marine diesel engines
- Speed: 8.5 knots (15.7 km/h; 9.8 mph)

The 120-ton class dry dock is a class of naval auxiliary ship in service with the People's Liberation Army Navy (PLAN). Only a single unit was completed with hull number 809, and it was originally given the name 809 Floating Dock after the hull number. However, the pennant number and its name may have been changed due to the change in the Chinese naval ships naming convention.

Designed in Shanghai by Shenjia Shipyard (申佳船厂), also known as the 4805th Factory of PLAN in Shanghai in the mid-1960s, construction began at the same shipyard in 1967 after design was completed, during the greatest political turmoil in China at the time, namely, Cultural Revolution. The result was the delay of the program, with the launching of the vessel did not commence until approximately three years later on June 27, 1970. The program suffered another serious blow approximately two months after its launching on August 31, 1970, when copper workers operated against the regulation by opening the valve, resulting in the sinking of the vessel. The salvage and repair cost totaled ¥120,000 and delayed the program further for two more months, with sea trials finally conducted in October 1970. The dry dock was finally completed and handed over to PLAN in 1971 for a naval base in Fujian.

Class	Pennant #	Builder	Launched	Commissioned	Status	Fleet
120-ton	809	4805th Factory	June 27, 1970	1971	Active	East Sea Fleet
