= Nanjun 610-class dredger =

Chinese navy ship

Class overview
- Operators: People's Liberation Army Navy

General characteristics
- Class & type: Nanjun 610
- Electronic warfare & decoys: None
- Armament: Unarmed
- Aircraft carried: None
- Aviation facilities: None

Nanjun 610 class dredger is a class of little known naval auxiliary ship currently in service with the People's Liberation Army Navy (PLAN). The name of this class is after the first unit commissioned, with the exact type still remains unknown, and a total of two of this class have been confirmed in active service as of mid-2010s.

Nanjun 610 class series ships in PLAN service are designated by a combination of two Chinese characters followed by three-digit number. The second Chinese character is Jun (浚), meaning dredge in Chinese, because these ships are classified as dredgers. The first Chinese character denotes which fleet the ship is service with, with East (Dong, 东) for East Sea Fleet, North (Bei, 北) for North Sea Fleet, and South (Nan, 南) for South Sea Fleet. However, the pennant numbers may have changed due to the change of Chinese naval ships naming convention.

Class	Pennant #	Status	Fleet
Nanjun 610 class	Nan-Jun 610	Active	South Sea Fleet
Nanjun 611 class	Nan-Jun 611	Active	South Sea Fleet
