= Chinese ship Xun 701 =

Chinese naval auxiliary ship

History

China
- Name: Xun 701
- Status: Retired

General characteristics
- Class & type: Yanxi
- Displacement: 1,200 t (1,200 long tons; 1,300 short tons) (full)
- Length: 60 m (196 ft 10 in)
- Beam: 11 m (36 ft 1 in)
- Draught: 3.5 m (11 ft 6 in)
- Propulsion: 2 × diesel engines, 1,800 hp (1,342 kW); 2 shafts
- Speed: 16 knots (30 km/h; 18 mph)
- Range: 4,500 mi (7,200 km) at 11 knots
- Complement: 110
- Sensors & processing systems: "Fin Curve" navigation radar
- Armament: 1 twin 37 mm gun; 2 twin 14.5 mm guns

Xun 701 was an auxiliary ship of China's People's Liberation Army Navy (PLAN). It was the PLAN's first weapon trials ship and the sole member of the Yanxi class. The ship was built in Shanghai from 1978 to 1980. It may have originally been intended to be a oceanographic research ship; the ship resembled the Xiang Yang Hong 02-series oceanographic research ships.

Xun 701 supported Soviet P-15 Termit missile launch and recovery during tests.
