= Type 802 tug =

Chinese tug ship

The Type 802 tug is a Chinese People's Liberation Army Navy (PLAN) version of the former-Soviet Gromovoy class tug. The difference between the Chinese version and the original Soviet version is minor, mainly in the modification of living quarters. For example, space used for milk storage is converted for vegetable storage, and the Russian-style oven and stove are replaced with Chinese types. Also, an air conditioning system has been added for operation in warmer climates. Out of a total of 17 ships built between 1958 through 1962 in Shanghai and Dalian, 15 still remain active as of the early 2010s, despite their age.

Tugs in the type 802 series in PLAN service are designated by a combination of two Chinese characters followed by a three-digit number. The second Chinese character is Tuo (拖), meaning tug in Chinese, because these ships are tugs. The first Chinese character denotes which fleet the ship is in service with; for example, East (Dong, 东) for East Sea Fleet, North (Bei, 北) for North Sea Fleet, and South (Nan, 南) for South Sea Fleet. However, the pennant numbers may have changed due to the change of Chinese naval ships naming convention. Specification:

- Length (m): 45.7
- Beam (m): 9.5
- Draft (m): 4.6
- Standard displacement (t): 795
- Full displacement (t): 890
- Speed (kn): 11
- Rang (nmi): 7000 @ 7 kn
- Crew: 25 – 30
- Propulsion: two diesel engines @ 1300 hp
- Armament: four 12.7 mm or 14.5 mm machine guns

Type	Pennant #	Status	Fleet
802	Nan-Tuo 149	Active	South Sea Fleet
802	Nan-Tuo 156	Active	South Sea Fleet
802	Nan-Tuo 166	Active	South Sea Fleet
802	Nan-Tuo 167	Active	South Sea Fleet
802	Bei-Tuo 680	Active	North Sea Fleet
802	Bei-Tuo 683	Active	North Sea Fleet
802	Bei-Tuo 684	Active	North Sea Fleet
802	Bei-Tuo 716	Active	North Sea Fleet
802	Dong-Tuo 802	Active	East Sea Fleet
802	Dong-Tuo 809	Active	East Sea Fleet
802	Dong-Tuo 811	Active	East Sea Fleet
802	Dong-Tuo 813	Active	East Sea Fleet
802	Dong-Tuo 822	Active	East Sea Fleet
802	Dong-Tuo 824	Active	East Sea Fleet
802	Dong-Tuo 827	Active	East Sea Fleet
