= Fuzhou-class tanker =

Chinese naval auxiliary ship class

Class overview
- Builders: Hudong Shipyard
- Operators: People's Liberation Army Navy
- In service: c. 1970 - c. 2015
- Completed: 18
- Retired: 18

General characteristics
- Type: Tanker
- Displacement: 2,134 tonnes (2,100 long tons; 2,352 short tons) (full)
- Length: 63.5 metres (208 ft)
- Beam: 12.6 metres (41 ft)
- Draught: 3.8 metres (12 ft)
- Propulsion: 1 x diesel engine; 1 shaft; Total output: 441 kilowatts (591 hp)
- Speed: 11 knots (20 km/h; 13 mph)
- Crew: 35
- Sensors & processing systems: 1 x Fin Curve navigation radar
- Armament: 2 x twin 25mm/80 guns; 2 x twin 14.5mm/93 guns

The Fuzhou-class tanker (as designated by NATO) is a class of auxiliary ship in the People's Republic of China's People's Liberation Army Navy (PLAN). They were built from 1964 to 1970. 11 were completed as oil tankers, and seven as water tankers. All were retired by 2015.

== Sources ==
- Saunders, Stephan, ed. (2015). Jane's Fighting Ships 2015-2016. Jane's Information Group. ISBN 978-0710631435.
- Wertheim, Eric (2013). The Naval Institute Guide to Combat Fleets of the World: Their Ships, Aircraft, and Systems (16 ed.). Annapolis, Maryland: Naval Institute Press. ISBN 978-1591149545.
