= 8 cubic meter-class dredger =

Chinese naval auxiliary vessel

History

PRC
- Builder: East Sea Shipyard
- Completed: July 1985
- Acquired: July 1985
- Commissioned: July 1985

General characteristics
- Length: 40 m (131 ft 3 in)
- Beam: 16 m (52 ft 6 in)
- Draught: 2.1 m (6 ft 11 in)
- Depth: 3 m (9 ft 10 in)
- Endurance: 15 days

The 8 cubic meter class dredger is a class of naval auxiliary ship currently in service with the People's Liberation Army Navy (PLAN). The complete name of the class is 8 cubic meter grab dredger, and it can also be used as a crane ship, capable of lifting a maximum of a hundred tons for each single lift. In 1984, the PLAN Equipment and Technology department signed a contract with East Sea Shipyard to build an 8 cubic meter class dredger / crane ship designed to meet the requirements of Nippon Kaiji Kyokai (ClassNK). The general designers were Xun Zhi-Liang (荀志亮) and Zhang Lin-Sheng (张林生). Construction began in December 1984, and after completion, the ship sailed to Qingdao in June 1985 for further sea trials, which were completed successfully. The following month, the ship was handed over to the PLAN.

8 cubic meter class dredger in PLAN service was originally designated by a combination of two Chinese characters followed by three-digit number. The first Chinese character is Jiao (交), short for Jiao-Tong (交通, meaning traffic in Chinese). The second Chinese character is Zhua (抓), short for Zhua-Dou-Shi (抓斗, meaning grab in Chinese, because the ship is a grab dredger). However, the pennant numbers may have changed due to the change of Chinese naval ship-naming convention.

class	Pennant #	Builder	Commissioned	Status
8-m^{3} class	Jiao-Zhua 110	East Sea Shipyard	July 1987	Active
