= Type 946 submarine rescue ship =

Chinese submarine rescue ship

History

PRC
- Status: Active

General characteristics
- Type: Submarine rescue ship (ASR)
- Propulsion: Marine Diesel
- Sensors & processing systems: Navigation radar
- Electronic warfare & decoys: None
- Armament: Various
- Armour: None

Type 946 submarine rescue ship with NATO reporting name Dazhou (大舟, meaning Great Ark) class is a type of coastal submarine rescue ship developed by China for the People's Liberation Army Navy (PLAN). A development designated as Type 946A is also in service with PLAN.

== Type 946 ==
The Type 946 is the first model of Type 946 series and the requirement of Type 946 was issued on January 22, 1970, from PLAN headquarters, with two ships to be built simultaneously. Hudong-Zhonghua Shipyard was originally assigned as the contractor, but this was later changed to Guangzhou Shipyard International. Construction begun on July 25, 1974, and both were launched on the same day, May 5, 1977, and sea trials for both begun in June 1977. Sea trials close to shore was completed from September 23 through September 30, 1977, and from November 26 through December 1977, sea trials in open ocean was completed for both ships. Both units were formally handed over to PLAN on December 26, 1977, and both were initially assigned to South Sea Fleet. However, one of the ship, Nan-Jiu 504 was reassigned to North Sea Fleet and renamed as Bei-Jiu 137. Specification:

- Length (m): 79
- Beam (m): 9.5
- Draft (m): 2.6
- Displacement (t): 1100
- Speed (kt): 18
- Crew: 130
- Armament: 4 twin 37 mm gun & 4 twin 14.5 mm MG
- Propulsion: two diesel engines

== Type 946A ==
The Type 946A (Type 946 Jia, 甲) is the successor of the earlier Type 946, and it is an enlarged version of Type 946. Requirements were issued in September 1978, with Hudong Shipyard assigned as the builder. The ship entered service with PLAN in December 1982 and received NATO reporting name Dadong (大东) class, meaning Great East. Type 946A is the last purposely designed submarine rescue ship in PLAN service, and later ships would have both the submarine rescue capability and capability to resupply submarines, and hence referred as submarine support ships by Chinese. Specification:

- Length (m): 82
- Beam (m): 11
- Draft (m): 2.7
- Displacement (t): 1500
- Speed (kt): 18
- Crew: 150
- Armament: 4 twin 25 mm gun
- Propulsion: two 7400 hp diesel engine.

== Ships ==
Type 946 series in PLAN service are designated by a combination of two Chinese characters followed by three-digit number. The second Chinese character is Jiu (救), meaning service in Chinese, because these ships are classified as service ship. The first Chinese character denotes which fleet the ship is service with, with East (Dong, 东) for East Sea Fleet, North (Bei, 北) for North Sea Fleet, and South (Nan, 南) for South Sea Fleet. The pennant numbers have changed due to the change of Chinese naval ships naming convention.

Type	Pennant #	Name	Builder	Launched	Commissioned	Status	Fleet
946	Nan-Jiu 502	Dazhou	Guangzhou Shipyard International	May 5, 1977	Dec 26, 1977	Active	South Sea Fleet
946	Bei-Jiu 137	Dazhou	Guangzhou Shipyard International	May 5, 1977	Dec 26, 1977	Active	North Sea Fleet
946A	Dong-Jiu 304	Dadong	Hudong-Zhonghua Shipyard	―	Dec 1982	Active	East Sea Fleet
