= Type 904 dive tender =

Chinese class of naval diving support vessel

History

PRC
- Status: Active

General characteristics
- Class & type: Yan Qian class
- Type: Dive tender (YDT) & General purpose research ship (AGE)
- Propulsion: Marine Diesel
- Sensors & processing systems: Navigation radar
- Electronic warfare & decoys: None
- Armament: Unarmed
- Armour: None
- Aircraft carried: None
- Aviation facilities: None

Type 904 dive tender is a class of Chinese dive tender designed the People’s Republic of China (PRC) for the People's Liberation Army Navy (PLAN), and the late models Type 904I and Type 904II have received the NATO reporting name Yanqian,(研潜 in Chinese), meaning Research Diving. In addition to performing diving-support missions, Type 904 I and II ships are also general purpose research vessels (AGE) frequently assigned scientific research tasks.

== Type 904 ==
Type 904 shares the same hull of Type 991II Youdian class cable layer, but the original design encountered difficulty when the development of domestic Chinese saturation diving support system stalled. Decision was made to import such system from abroad, with French system eventually selected. Consequently, the original Type 904 never went into production because the design had to be modified to accommodate the foreign saturation diving support system, and the modified design is designated as Type 904I.

== Type 904I ==
Type 904I is a slight variation of earlier Type 904 design with design change to incorporate machinery to handle foreign diver support system. The crane at the stern is capable of lifting 13-ton weight. Equipped with French SM358-Z dive support system, Type 904I can support divers up to a depth of two hundred meters. Designed by the 708th Institute of China State Shipbuilding Corporation, which is also more commonly known as China Shipbuilding and Oceanic Engineering Design Academy (中国船舶及海洋工程设计研究) nowadays, Type 904I is capable of normal operations in sea state 3 and wind scale 5. Type 904I is named as Kan-Cha (Kancha, 勘查) I, meaning Exploration in Chinese. Specification:

- Length (m): 69.9
- Width (m): 10.5
- Draft (m): 3.64
- Displacement (t): 1354.8
- Speed (kt): 13.5
- Propulsion: 2 diesel engines @ 1100 hp (809 kW)

== Type 904II ==
Type 904II is a slight upgrade of earlier Type 904I with some improvements. Designed by the same institute and built by the same shipyard, Type 904II can operate in the same sea state Type 904I does. Euipped with French SM360 diver support system, Type 904II can support diver to a depth of three hundred meters. Specification:

- Length (m): 71.55
- Waterline length (m): 66
- Length between perpendiculars (m): 63
- Width (m):10.5
- Depth (m): 5.2
- Draft (m): 3.6
- Displacement (t): 1327
- Speed (kt): 14
- Propulsion: 2 diesel engines @ 1100 jp (809 kW)

== Ships ==
Original names of these ships listed in the table below might have been changed due to the new naming conventions of PLAN.

Type	Pennant #	Builder	Started	Commissioned	Status
904I	Kan-Cha 1	Hudong-Zhonghua Shipbuilding	Feb 8, 1979	Aug 1981	Active
904II	Kan-Cha 2	Hudong-Zhonghua Shipbuilding	―	May 1983	Active
