= Type 922 rescue and salvage ship =

Type of ship

Type 922 rescue and salvage ship is a series of rescue and salvage ships developed by China for the People's Liberation Army Navy (PLAN), and after decades of service they still remain active in other Chinese governmental establishments.

== Type 922 ==
Type 922 is the first model of Type 922 series, and it was converted from a 3400-ton cargo ship transferred from Ministry of Transportation. Order to develop rescue and salvage ship was issued on October 27, 1960 and on July 16, 1962, the design was approved. Construction began in early 1964 after nearly a year of preparation and in July 1965, the ship was launched. Sea trials were successfully completed on July 27, 1966 and test runs for rescue and salvage operations were completed in November of the same year in . The ship was formally handed to PLAN in December 1966 as Hai-Jiu (海救, meaning Sea Rescue) 403.

== Type 922II ==
Type 922II is the development resulted from experience gained from the deployment of Type 922II.On May 5, 1970, a dedicated design was proposed by to the 708th Institute of China State Shipbuilding Corporation, which is also more commonly known as China Shipbuilding and Oceanic Engineering Design Academy (中国船舶及海洋工程设计研究). On April 15, 1971, the design review began at Guangzhou. Construction began at Guangzhou Shipyard International on September 20, 1971, and the ship was launched on September 27, 1973. Sea trials began in August 1975 and was concluded on January 10, 1976. Test for rescue operations began on April 23, 1976 and was concluded on June 14, 1976. The ship was formally handed over to PLAN on June 30, 1976 with pennant number as Nan-Jiu (南救, meaning South Rescue) 503, and received NATO reporting name as Dalang (大浪), meaning Big Wave in Chinese. After three decades of service, Type 922II was transferred to Chinese Fishery Administration on November 27, 2006 and remains active to this day. Specification:

- Length (m): 113.5
- Width (m): 15.5
- Displacement (t): 4450
- Speed: 20 kn (37 km/h)
- Range: 3,500 nmi (6,500 km)
- Endurance (day): 50

== Type 922III ==
Type 922III was originally planned in 1978, but original design had to be modified to meet the updated requirement. In September 1982, design work was completed and construction begun on December 20, 1982 at Wuchang Shipyard. The ship was originally scheduled to be built by Guangzhou Shipyard International but a decision was made on May 27, 1982 to have it built at Wuchang Shipyard instead. Type 922III was launched on May 20, 1983, and after traveling to Shanghai, began sea trials on April 17, 1986. Further tests were conducted in Zhoushan from May 28 to June 17, 1986, and in Qingdao and Dalian from July 21 to September 2, 1986. Trials revealed some modification was needed and after such modifications were completed, the ship was formally handed to PLAN as Bei-Jiu (北救, meaning North Rescue in Chinese) 122 in Qingdao on March 31, 1987. Type 922III is armed with twin 37 mm guns and received NATO reporting name Dalang II class.

== Type 922IIIA ==
Type 912IIA is the improvement of earlier Type 912III. The obvious external difference between Type 912IIIA and its predecessor Type 912III is minor and both share the same NATO reporting name Dalang.II class. A total of three ships were built with one serving in each fleet. Type 922IIIA ships in PLAN service are designated by a combination of two Chinese characters followed by three-digit number. The second Chinese character is Jiu (救), meaning rescue in Chinese, because these ships are rescue and salvage ships. The first Chinese character denotes which fleet the ship is in service with, with East (Dong, 东) for East Sea Fleet, North (Bei, 北) for North Sea Fleet, and South (Nan, 南) for South Sea Fleet. The pennant numbers have changed or some units due to the change of Chinese naval ships naming convention. Type 922IIIA has received NATO reporting name Dalang III class.

== Ships ==
Original names of some of the ships in the table might have been changed after transferring to different governmental establishments.

Type	Pennant #	Builder	Laid down	Launched	Commissioned	Status	Fleet
922	Hai-Jiu 403	Hudong-Zhonghua Shipyard	1964	Jul 1965	Dec 1966	Transferred to CCG in 2006	Become Chinese cutter Haijing 3411
922II	Nan-Jiu 503	Guangzhou Shipyard International	September 20, 1971	September 27, 1973	June 30, 1976	Active	South Sea Fleet
922III	Bei-Jiu 122	Wuchang Shipyard	December 20, 1982	May 20, 1983	March 31, 1987	Active	North Sea Fleet
922IIIA	Bei-Jiu 138	―	―	―	―	―	North Sea Fleet
922IIIA	Dong-Jiu 332	―	―	―	―	―	East Sea Fleet
922IIIA	Nan-Jiu 510	―	―	―	―	―	South Sea Fleet
