= Hua Chuan No. 1-class repair dry dock =

Repair dry dock in China

History

PRC
- Name: Hua Chuan No. 1
- Namesake: Chinese Ship
- Builder: 4801st Factory
- Acquired: 2016
- Commissioned: 2016
- Status: In service

General characteristics
- Type: Dry dock
- Displacement: 13000 t
- Armour: None
- Aircraft carried: None
- Aviation facilities: None

Hua Chuan (华船, meaning Chinese Ship) No. 1 (Yi Hao, 一号in Chinese, meaning Number 1) a repair dry dock (hull classification symbol: ARD) built in China for its People's Liberation Army Navy (PLAN). At the time of its commission, it is the largest repair dry dock in PLAN.

The origin of Hua Chuan No. 1 repair dry dock (ARD) rooted in the fact that most PLAN repair dry docks are small and only capable of handling small boat of 500 tons displacement or less, so when larger warships need to be serviced, they must sail back to shore base on the mainland, which is extremely inefficient. A larger repair dry dock is needed to service larger warships on site away from shore, and PLAN 4801st Factory in Huangpu District, Guangzhou was assigned to build a large repair dry dock (ARD), which was completed in early 2016. With displacement of more than 13,000 tons, Hua Chuan No. 1 is large enough to hold all existing Chinese warships with the size of destroyers or below, and it is also capable of handling civilian ships of 30,000 tons or less. In addition to the usual repairing and rescuing equipment, the dry dock is also equipped with command and communication systems and thus can be used as temporary command center when needs to be. Hua Chuan No. 1 has entered service with South Sea Fleet in February 2016.
