= Type 907A torpedo trials craft =

Chinese torpedo trial craft

Type 907A torpedo trial craft is a Chinese torpedo trial craft currently in service with the People's Liberation Army Navy (PLAN). After nearly three decades of service, the ship still remains active.

Type 907A is designed by the 708th Institute of China State Shipbuilding Corporation, which is also more commonly known as China Shipbuilding and Oceanic Engineering Design Academy (中国船舶及海洋工程设计研究) nowadays. A single unit was completed by Guangxi Guijiang Shipyard in 1987, and named as Kancha (勘查, meaning survey in Chinese) 4. The ship is designed to conduct torpedo and mine trials and support other underwater weaponry tests. Specification:

- Length (m): 52.4
- Beam (m): 8.2
- Draft (m): 2.9
- Displacement (t): 615
- Speed (kt): 15.5
- Propulsion: two 8300ZC diesel engines @ 809 kW (1100 hp) each

Type	Pennant #	Builder	Commissioned	Status
907A	Kancha 4	Guijiang Shipyard	Feb 1987	Active
