= Jinyou-class oil tanker =

Chinese tanker class

History

PRC
- Status: Active

General characteristics
- Class & type: Jinyou class
- Type: Tanker
- Displacement: 4,800 long tons (4,900 t)
- Length: 99 m (324 ft 10 in)
- Beam: 31.8 m (104 ft 4 in)
- Draft: 5.7 m (18 ft 8 in)
- Propulsion: SEMT-Pielstick 8PC2.2L marine diesel engine x 1
- Speed: 15 knots (28 km/h; 17 mph)
- Range: 4,000 nmi (7,400 km; 4,600 mi) @ 9 kn (17 km/h; 10 mph)
- Complement: 40
- Sensors & processing systems: Navigation radar
- Electronic warfare & decoys: None
- Armament: None
- Aircraft carried: None
- Aviation facilities: None

The Jinyou-class oil tanker is a class of Chinese tanker ship that is in service with People's Liberation Army Navy (PLAN). A total of three units were built by Japanese Kanashashi Shipyard and entered service with PLAN between 1989 – 1990. These unarmed tankers were upgraded with Chinese radars after delivery, but remain unarmed. One unit was subsequently converted to water tanker (AWT) and remains in active service in mid 2010s, but it is unclear which one of the three oilers the water tanker was converted from. Specification:

- Displacement (t): 4800
- Length (m): 99
- Width (m): 31.8
- Draft (m): 5.7
- Speed (kn): 15
- Endurance: 4000 nmi @ 9 kn
- Propulsion: 3000 hp SEMT-Pielstick 8PC2.2L diesel x 1
- Armament: None
- Radar: 1 Type 756 navigational radar
- Crew: 40

Oil tanker version originally went into service:

Type	NATO designation	Pennant No.	Name (English)	Name (Han 中文)	Commissioned	Displacement	Fleet	Status
Jinyou-class transport oil tanker (AOT)	Jinyou class	Dong-You 622	East Oil 622	东油 622	?	4800 t	East Sea Fleet	Retired
Jinyou-class transport oil tanker (AOT)	Jinyou class	Dong-You 625	East Oil 625	东油 625	?	4800 t	East Sea Fleet	Retired
Jinyou-class transport oil tanker (AOT)	Jinyou class	Dong-You 675	East Oil 675	东油 675	?	4800 t	East Sea Fleet	Retired

Water tanker version converted from one of the original oilers:

Type	NATO designation	Pennant No.	Name (English)	Name (Han 中文)	Commissioned	Displacement	Fleet	Status
Jinyou class water tanker (AWT)	Jinyou class	Nan-Shui 960	South Water 960	南水 960	?	4800 t	South Sea Fleet	Active
