= Leizhou-class tanker =

Chinese tanker ship class

General characteristics
- Type: Tanker
- Displacement: 900 (t)
- Beam: 9.8 (m)
- Draft: 3 (m)
- Propulsion: 600 hp diesel
- Speed: 10 – 12 knots
- Complement: 30
- Armament: 2 × 37 mm twin gun; 2 ×14.5 mm twin machine gun

The Leizhou class tanker is a class of Chinese tanker that is in service with People's Liberation Army Navy (PLAN). This class tanker was built in two separate versions, majority of which were built as water tankers, and a smaller number totaling 5 were built as oil tankers. The oil tanker version can be distinguished by their raised cargo expansion trunk down the centerline of the well deck. Entering service with PLAN since the early 1960s, these ships are currently being disarmed and retired.
