= Type 906 torpedo trials craft =

Chinese class of naval diving support vessel

History

PRC
- Status: Active

General characteristics
- Class & type: Xiang Yang Hong 9 class
- Type: Torpedoweaponry trials craft (YTT) and general purpose research ship (AGE)
- Propulsion: Marine Diesel
- Sensors & processing systems: Navigation radar
- Electronic warfare & decoys: None
- Armament: Unarmed
- Armour: None
- Aircraft carried: None
- Aviation facilities: None

Type 906 torpedo trial craft is a Chinese torpedo craft currently in service with the People's Liberation Army Navy (PLAN), and has received NATO reporting name Xiang Yang Hong 9 or 向阳红 9, meaning facing the red sun. After more than three decades of service, the ship still remains active as of mid 2010s. In addition to support torpedo weaponry development, the ship is equipped to perform various research tasks, and thus also classified as general purpose research ship (AGE/AG).

Program of Type 906 first begun in October 1981 when the Commission for Science, Technology and Industry for National Defense (COSTIND) issued the requirement, and the 708th Institute of China State Shipbuilding Corporation, which is also more commonly known as China Shipbuilding and Oceanic Engineering Design Academy (中国船舶及海洋工程设计研究) nowadays was contracted as the designer.

The ship displaces 2,300 tons and took five years and three months to complete. The hull is based on that of Type 625 research vessel, and in addition to conducting sea trials for torpedo, mine and other underwater weaponry trials, the ship is also tasked to perform missions to test and support acoustic systems such as DMT, PATS, and OCEANO. In addition, the ship is also capable of conducting weather and hydrographic research. named as Kancha (勘查, meaning survey in Chinese) 3, and the complete name was Drone Mine Acoustic Tracking System Work Mother Ship (Ba-Lei Shui-Sheng Gen-Zong Xi-Tong Gong-Zuo Mu-Chuang. 靶雷水声跟踪系统工作母船)

Type	Pennant #	Builder	Laid down	Launched	Commissioned	Status
906	Kancha 3	Hudong-Zhonghua Shipyard	Dec 1984	Oct 1986	Jan 1987	Active
