= Type 991 cable layer =

Chinese cable layer ship

Type 991 cable layer is a family of Chinese cable layers first saw service in Chinese navy, and later on, additional units also entered service with Chinese civilian authorities.

== Type 991I ==
Type 991 I is the first member of Type 991 series, and it is the first purposely designed cable layer / repair ship in China. Program begun in early 1961 when Chinese naval headquarter formally issued the order to the 708th Institute of China State Shipbuilding Corporation, and the 708th Institute is also more commonly known as China Shipbuilding and Oceanic Engineering Design Academy (中国船舶及海洋工程设计研究) nowadays. After extensive research, the 3rd Directorate of the 708th Institute (708所3室) begun design work in October 1963, but reviews revealed that there are some inadequacy in the design, so two new modified design was created in February 1964. The biggest change of the modified designs is that the original cable carrying capacity is limited to 155 tons in a single cargo hold compartment with cable length of 40 km at maximum. In the modified design, this is increased to 270 tons in two cargo hold compartments with cable length of 40 km at maximum. The diameter of the cable remained unchanged at 40 mm. On August 2, 1965, the 6th Ministry approved the design of Type 991. In March 1966, some final modification begun at Wuchang Shipyard, where the ship was planned to be built, and this final modification was completed in June 1966. However, Wuchang Shipyard did not built the ship, but instead, the ship was built in Guangzhou Shipyard, with work begun in 1967 and launched on June 7, 1969. On January 1, 1971, trials were successfully completed and the ship entered service in Chinese South Sea Fleet with pennant number B230. Type 991I is equipped with 10 ton (98.1 KN) EKM-20 cable laying machine that is indigenously designed in China. Specification:

- Overall length (m): 54.6
- Length between perpendiculars (m): 48
- Waterline (m): 50
- Beam (m): 9
- Depth (m): 4.4
- Standard draft (m): 2.6
- Full load draft (m): 3.06
- Standard displacement (t): 691
- Full load displacement (t): 850
- Speed (k): 12
- Engine: 2 x 294 kW (400 hp)
- Crew: 56
- Cable payload: 270 t of 40 mm cable, 70 km long

== Type 991II ==
After Type 991I cable layer entered service, Chinese navy recommended upgrading the ship based on the experience gained from deployment, but in order to reach the new requirement, major modification of the ship is needed. Designers notified the Directorate of Communication of Chinese naval headquarter on November 12, 1971, and on March 19, 1972, Chinese naval headquarter notified the 7th Academy accordingly. On December 6, 1972, review of the design of Type 992II was completed, and additional requirement for further upgrade was issued, which was subsequently completed on July 10, 1973.

In 1974, there was a change in priority because after more than two years of negotiation with Japan to purchase a cable layer for Paracel Islands, the deal was cancelled because the price tag of 25.6 million US dollars was too expensive and the 30 months it takes to complete was too simply slow. In addition, Ministry of Postal and Telecom also urgently needed a cable layer in order to meet the deadline of laying cable between China and Japan by the beginning of 1976. As a result, the first unit of Type 992II class was reassigned to civilian use for Ministry of Postal and Telecom, with further major modifications. The first ship of Type 991II class cable layer was laid down in 1975 and entered service in the same year. In June, 1977, the first Type 991II class cable layer for Chinese navy entered service and when program completed in 1983, a total of 6 completed. The ship received NATO reporting name as Youdian class (邮电, meaning postal and telecom in Chinese). Specification:

- Overall length (m): 71.55
- Length between perpendiculars (m): 66
- Waterline (m): 63
- Beam (m): 10.5
- Depth (m): 5.2
- Full load draft (m): 3.6
- Full load displacement (t): 1327
- Speed (k): 14
- Engine: 2 x 809 kW (1100 hp)
- Cable payload: 400 t

== Ships ==
All ships of Type 991 series cable layer are still active in the early 2010s after numerous upgrades, the latest which enables them to handle fiber optic cables (though their pennant numbers have changed due to the change of Chinese naval ships naming convention).

Type	Pennant #	Builder	Launched	Commissioned	Status	Fleet
991I	B230	Guangzhou Shipyard International Co., Ltd	Jun 7, 1969	Jan 1, 1971	Active	South Sea Fleet
991II	B233	Hudong-Zhonghua Shipbuilding Co., Ltd	1975	1975	Active	East Sea Fleet
991II	B234	Hudong-Zhonghua Shipbuilding Co., Ltd	―	―	Active	East Sea Fleet
991II	B764	Hudong-Zhonghua Shipbuilding Co., Ltd	―	―	Active	North Sea Fleet
991II	B765	Hudong-Zhonghua Shipbuilding Co., Ltd	―	―	Active	North Sea Fleet
991II	B873	Hudong-Zhonghua Shipbuilding Co., Ltd	―	―	Active	East Sea Fleet
991II	B874	Hudong-Zhonghua Shipbuilding Co., Ltd	―	1983	Active	East Sea Fleet
