= Auxiliary ship =

Type of naval ship

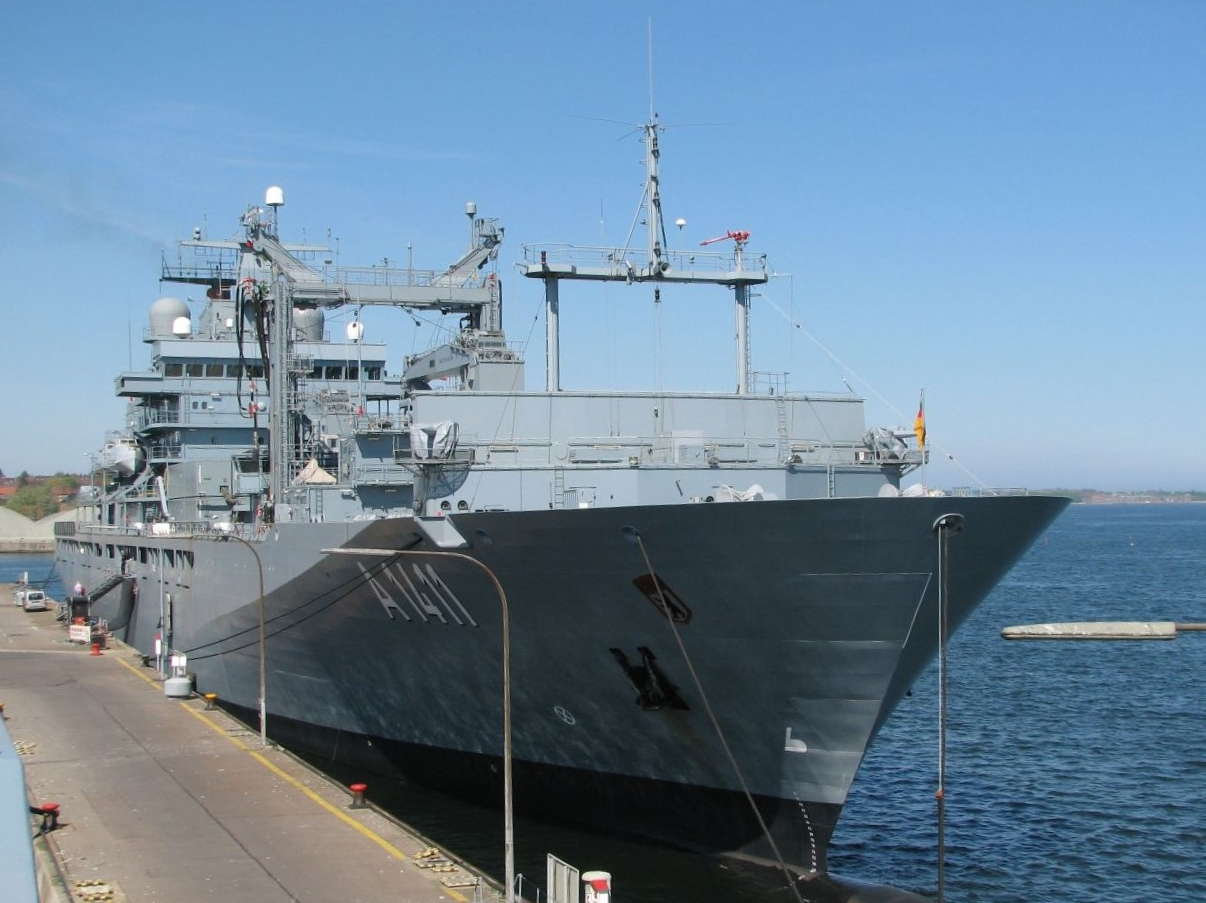
German Navy Berlin-class replenishment ship

An auxiliary ship is a naval ship designed to support combatant ships and other naval operations. Auxiliary ships are not primary combatant vessels, though they may have some limited combat capacity, usually for purposes of self-defense.

Auxiliary ships are extremely important for navies of all sizes because if they were not present the primary fleet vessels would be unsupported. Thus, virtually every navy maintains an extensive fleet of auxiliary ships, however, the composition and size of these auxiliary fleets vary depending on the nature of each navy and its primary mission. Smaller coastal navies tend to have smaller auxiliary vessels focusing primarily on littoral and training support roles, while larger blue-water navies tend to have larger auxiliary fleets comprising longer-range fleet support vessels designed to provide support far beyond territorial waters.

== Roles ==
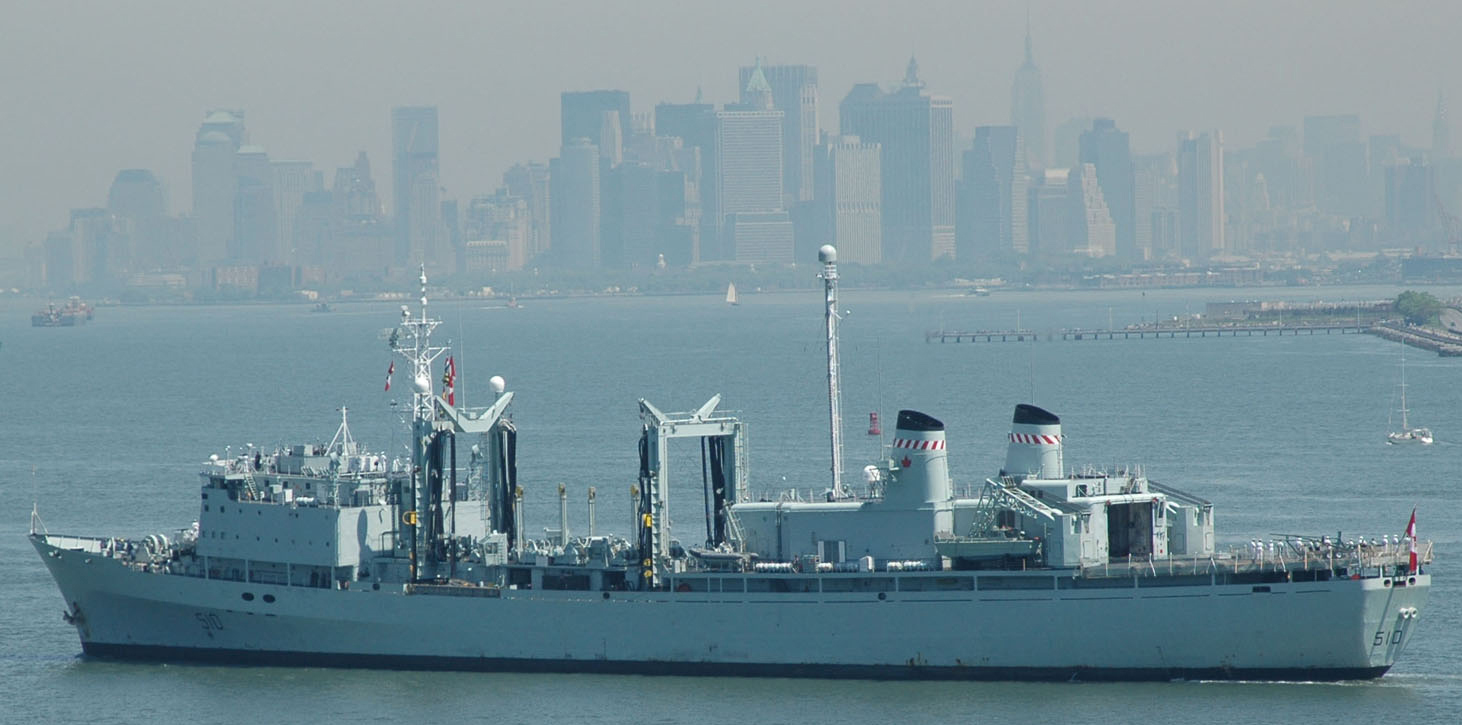
Royal Canadian Navy auxiliary oiler HMCS Preserver during New York fleet week, 2009

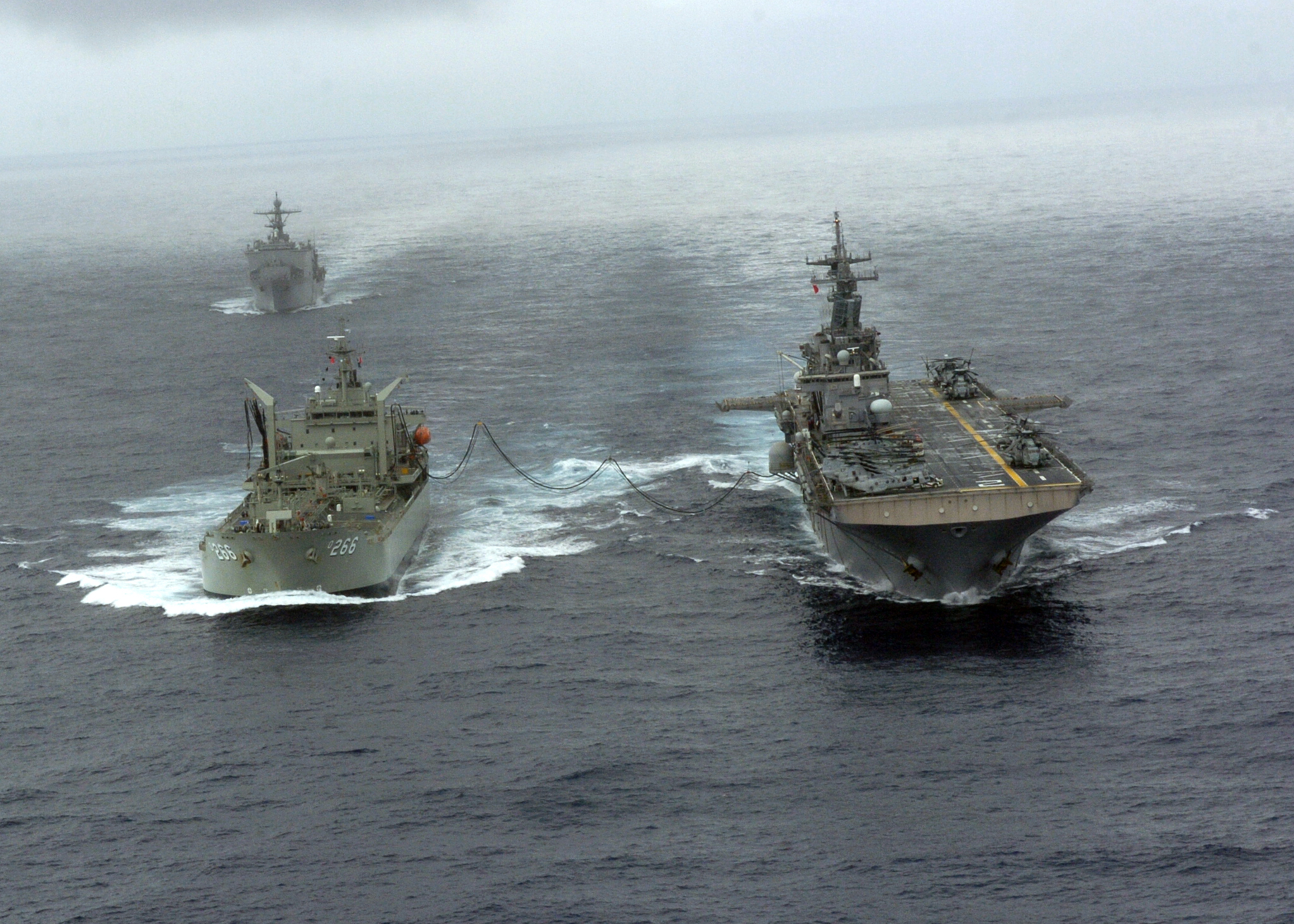
Australian oiler HMAS Sirius refueling USS Essex, June 2007

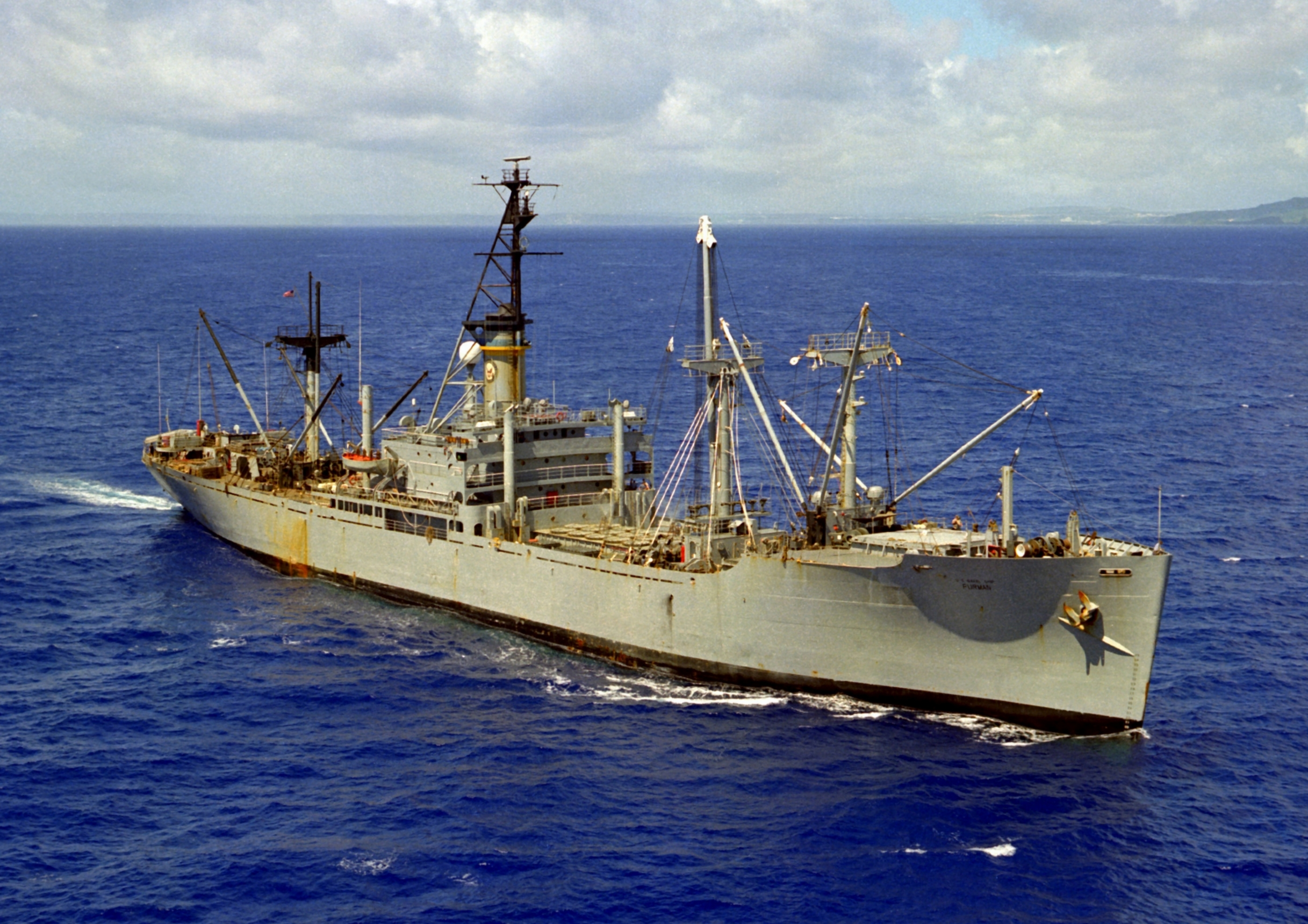
American cargo ship USNS Furman, 1981

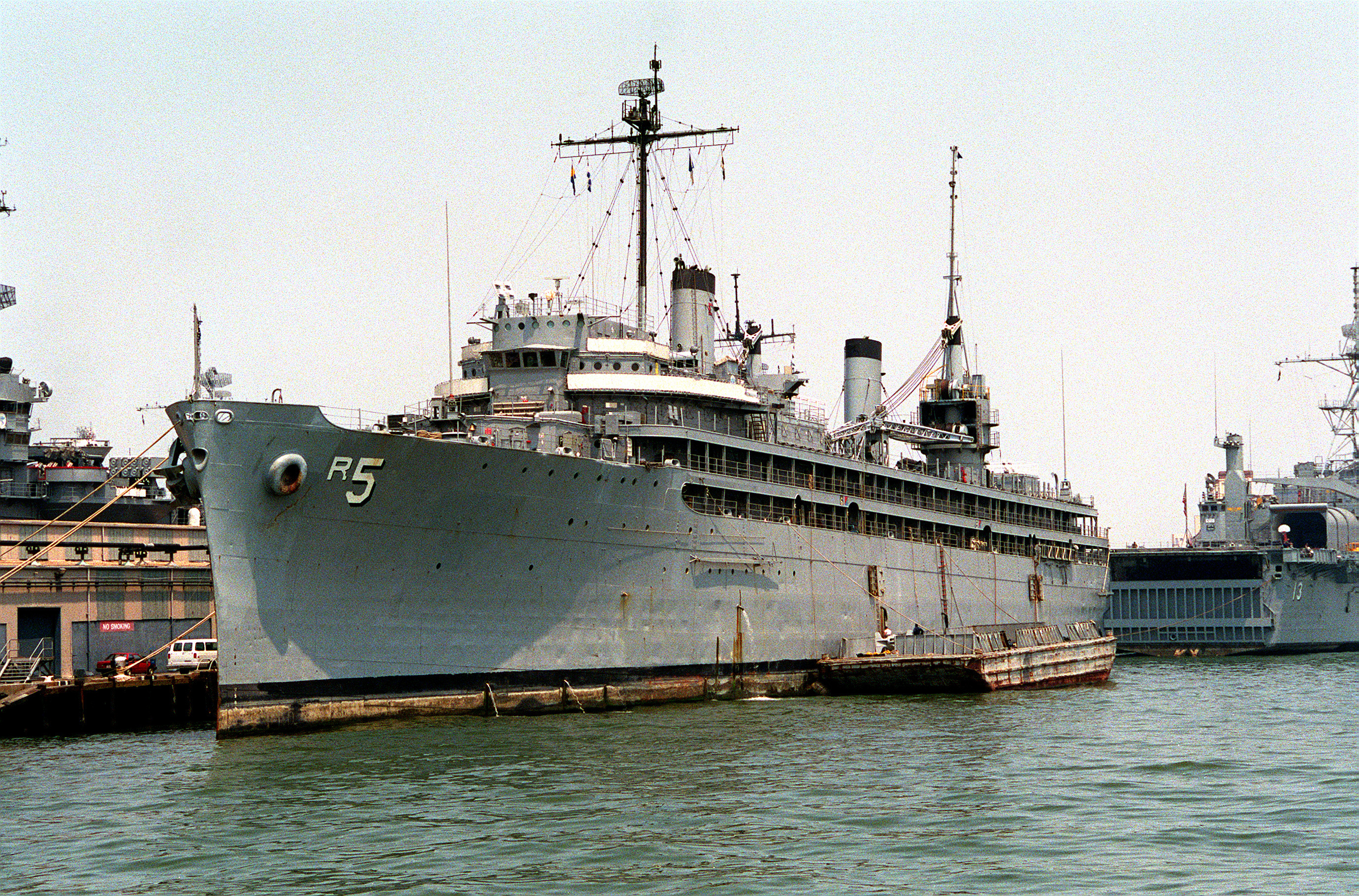
American repair ship USS Vulcan, June 1992

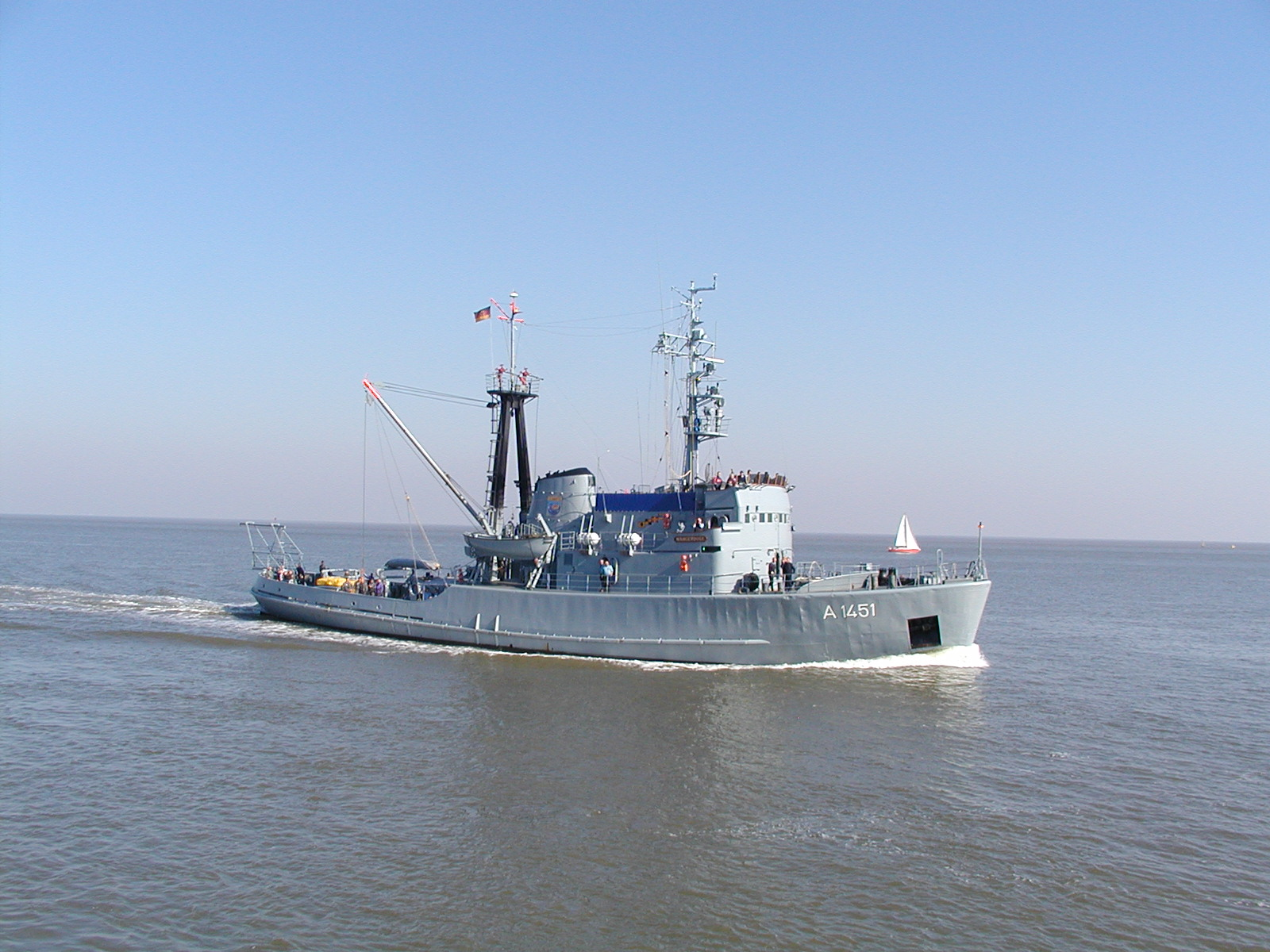
German tugboat Wangerooge, 2005

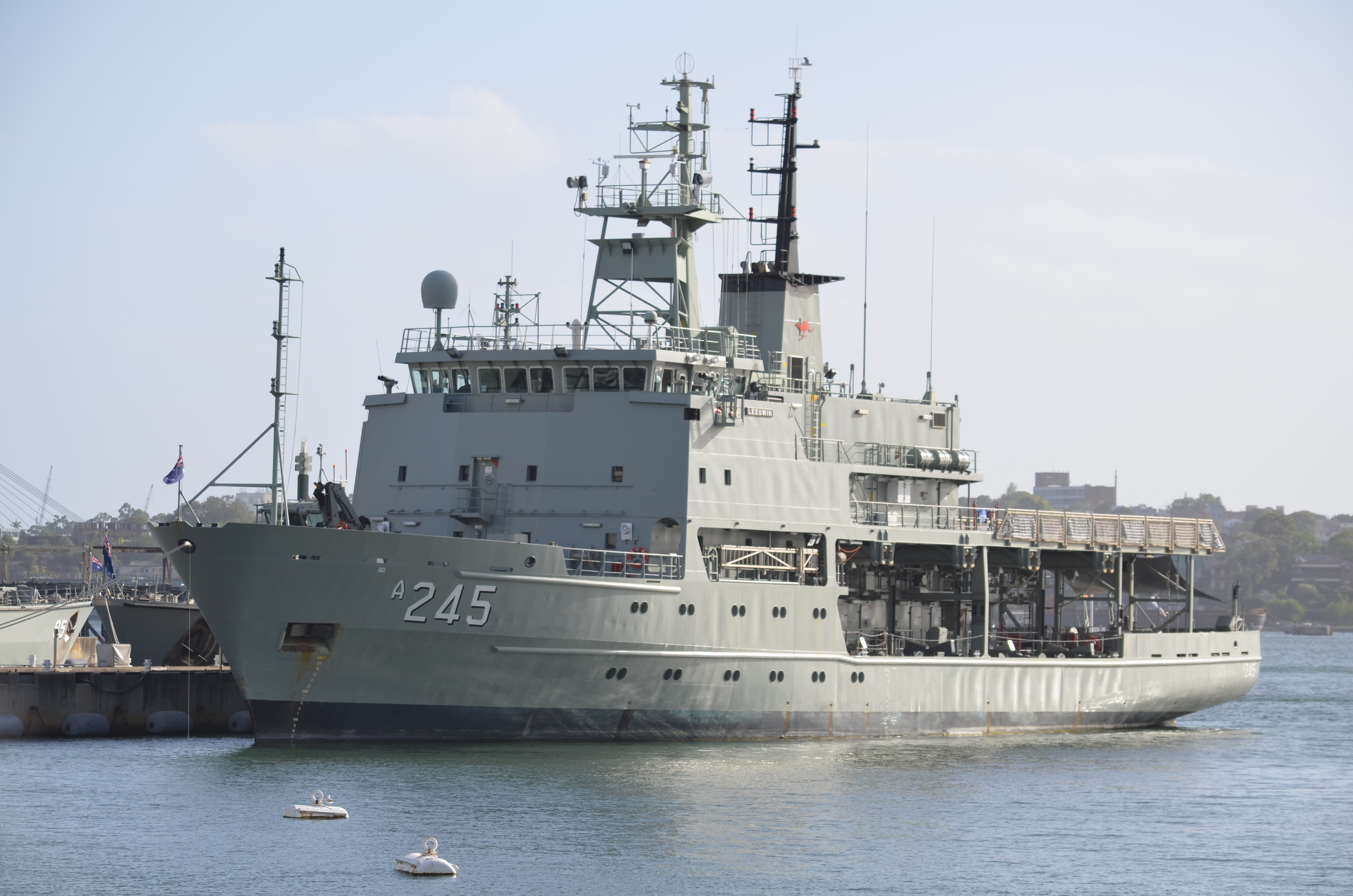
Australian survey ship HMAS Leeuwin, December 2013

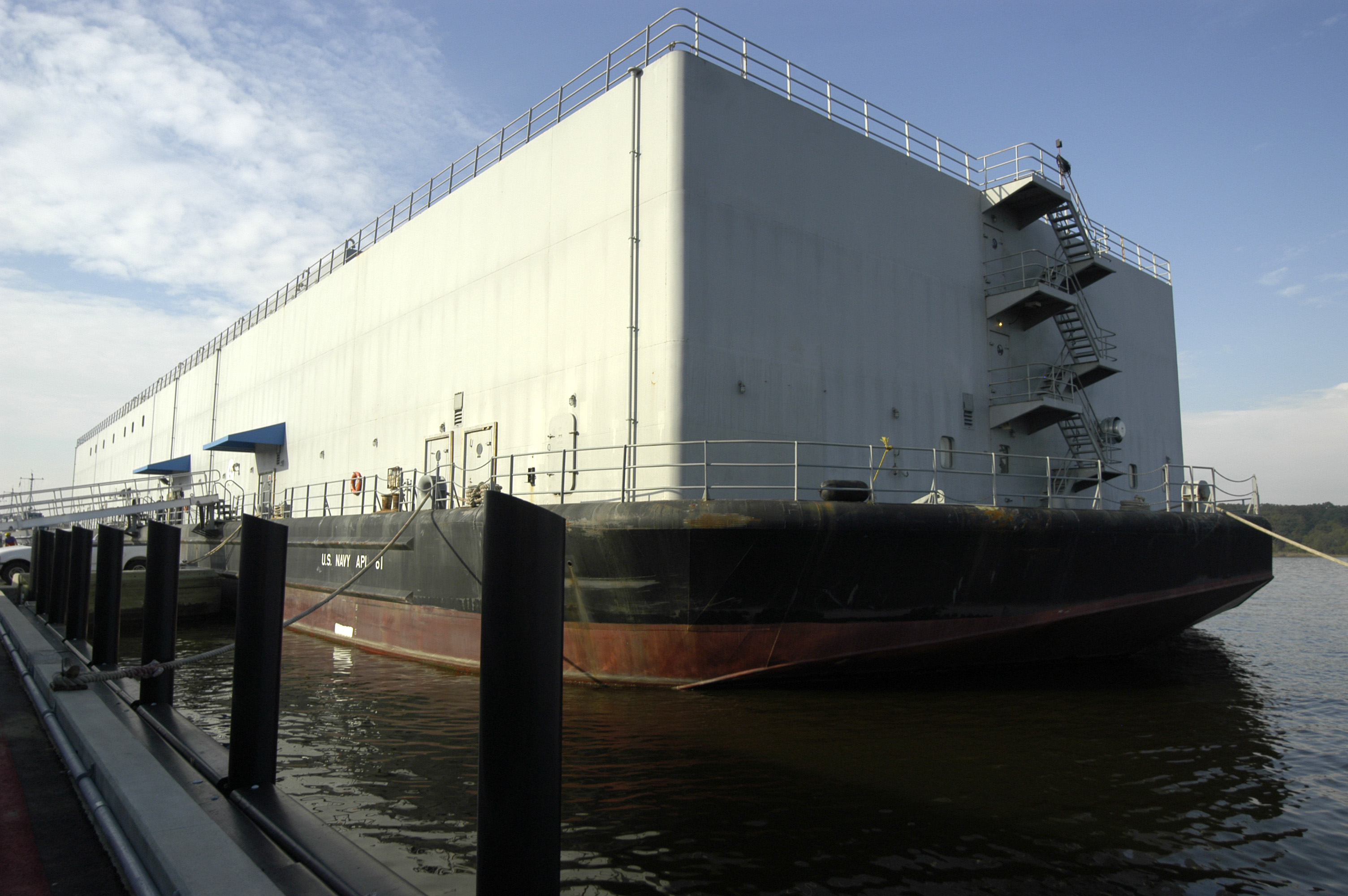
US Navy barracks ship APL-61 in 2003

=== Replenishment ===
One of the most direct ways that auxiliary ships support the fleet is by providing underway replenishment (also known as "replenishment at sea") to major fleet units. This allows the fleet to remain in the same location, with the replenishment vessels bringing up fuel, ammunition, food, and supplies from shore to the fleet wherever it is operating.

Oilers ("replenishment tankers") are vessels specifically designed to bring fuel oil to the fleet, while the earlier colliers supplied coal-burning warships. Specific role replenishment vessels include combat stores ships, depot ships, general stores issue ships, and ammunition ships.

Tenders are specifically designed to support a type of smaller naval unit, like submarines, destroyers, and seaplanes, providing a mobile base of operations for these units: specifically destroyer tenders, submarine tenders, seaplane tenders, torpedo boat tenders.

=== Transport ===
Supporting front-line operating bases requires immense transportation capacity. Transport ships are often converted merchant ships simply commissioned (APA, APD, APH, APV) into naval service. Tankers are transports specifically designed to ship fuel to forward locations. Transport ships are often employed not only carrying cargo for naval support but are in support of all forces of a nation's military (AK, AKA, AKN, AKR, AKS). In particular, troopships and attack transports are used to carry a large number of soldiers to operational theatres. Some transport ships are highly specialized, like the ammunition ships employed by the US Navy. Large ocean tugs (AT, ATO, ATF, ATA, ATR) are used to tow large auxiliary ships, like barges, floating repair docks, and floating cranes in the open sea, also disabled ships.

=== Repair ===
Repairing ships at sea or in conflict areas is important as it allows these vessels to return to service more quickly, while also increasing the chance of survival for ships critically damaged in battle. Repair vessels (US Navy: AR, ARB, ARC, ARG, ARH, ARL, ARV) range from small equipment ships known as Auxiliary repair docks, to the larger Auxiliary floating drydocks, there are also Aircraft repair ships that specialize in repair of naval aircraft.

=== Harbor ===
Harbor support is a critical support role, with various types of vessels including tugboats, barges, lighter barges, derrick-crane vessels, and others used to move ships and equipment around the port facilities, and depot ships and tends to service ships currently in the harbor. These vessels also help maintain the harbor by dredging channels, maintaining jetties and buoys, and even providing floating platforms for port defenses.

In US Navy, tugboats are type YT, YTB, YTM, YTL or a Type V ship. and barges are classified as a Type B ship or YF, YFN, YFR, or YFRN.

=== Support ===
Radar picket to increase the radar detection range around a force. Communications Relay Ships (AGMR) are floating communications stations. Tracking ships or Range Instrumentation Ships (AGM) are equipped with antennas and electronics to support the launching and tracking of missiles and rockets. Command ship (AGF) are flagships of the commander of a fleet. Wind-class icebreaker (AGB WAGB) are support ships. Rescue and salvage ship and Submarine rescue ship (ASR) for surface support ship for ship and submarine rescue. Barracks ships or Auxiliary Personal Living ships, (APL) are vessels-barges for service personnel to live on.

=== Research ===
A wide variety of vessels are employed as Technical Research Ships(AGTR), Tracking Ships(AGM), Environmental Research Ships (AGER), Hydrofoil Research Ships (AGEH), and Survey Vessels, primarily to provide a navy with a better understanding of its operating environment or to assist in testing new technologies for employment in other vessels.

=== Hospital ===
Hospital ships are able to provide medical care in remote locations to personnel.

=== Unclassified auxiliary ship ===
The US Navy also used an unclassified miscellaneous auxiliary ship classification in which the unclassified miscellaneous auxiliary ship classification is IX. An unclassified miscellaneous auxiliary ship can be a new ship without a classified role or a ship that does not fit into a standard category or a ship that had been removed from its classification.

== See also ==
- List of auxiliaries of the United States Navy
- List of auxiliary ship classes in service
- Service Squadron
- US Naval Advance Bases
