= East Sea Fleet =

Chinese naval unit

Eastern Theater Command Navy
- The People's Liberation Army Navy's jack and ensign
- Active: 1955–present
- Country: China
- Allegiance: Chinese Communist Party
- Branch: People's Liberation Army Navy
- Type: Naval fleet
- Part of: Eastern Theater Command
- Garrison/HQ: Ningbo, China

Commanders
- Current commander: Wang Zhongcai
- Current political commissar: Mei Wen

The Eastern Theater Command Navy (东部战区海军, ETCN) is a formation of China's People's Liberation Army Navy (PLAN) and the naval component of the Eastern Theater Command. The ETCN was reorganized from the East Sea Fleet (ESF) by 2016.

Currently Wang Zhongcai is the commander of the ESF and Mei Wen it's political commissar.

== History ==
The PLAN was formed toward the end of the Chinese Civil War. In March 1949, Zhang Aiping of the Third Field Army was ordered by the Central Military Commission (CMC) of the Chinese Communist Party to create a naval force from the field army. Zhang's only previous naval experience was organizing an irregular riverine force near Hongze Lake in 1941 and leading it in a successful campaign against local bandits. The PLAN was created on 21 April when Zhang established the East China Military Region Navy, or East China Navy (ECN), with a thirteen-member headquarters, and he was formally appointed by the CMC as the ECN's commander and commissar on 4 May. The ECN was reinforced by personnel from the Third Field Army, which would also dominate its and the later ESF's leadership, but its early operational capabilities were based on personnel and materiel captured or recruited from the retreating Republic of China (ROC). The latter included Lin Zun, who defected with the ROC Navy's Second Squadron and became the ECN's, and later the ESF's, deputy commander. The ECN's First Flotilla was formed in early May at Zhenjiang. The headquarters moved to Shanghai on 27 May. By late-June, the ECN was responsible for operational and naval industrial activities along the East China Sea coastline and the Yangtze up to Jiujiang.

Yuan Yelie became ECN commander in February 1951. The ECN became the ESF in 1955.

By 2016, the ESF was reorganized as the ETCN.

== Components ==
ETCN headquarters is at Ningbo, with additional bases in Fujian and Zhoushan. It controls coastal defenses from Lianyungang to Dongshan County.

In 2017, subunits included:

- 3rd Destroyer Zhidui (Note: Zhidui is a division leader grade organization variously translated as "flotilla", "naval ship brigade", or "detachment".)
- 6th Destroyer Zhidui
- 8th Frigate Dadui (Note: Dadui is a regiment leader grade organization in the PLAN sometimes translated as "squadron".)
- 21st Fastboat Zhidui
- 22nd Submarine Zhidui
- 42nd Submarine Zhidui
- 2nd Combat Support Zhidui
- 4th Air Division
- 6th Air Division
- 1st Flying Panther Regiment
- Radar brigade
