= Political Commissar of the People's Liberation Army Navy =

Political head of the Chinese Navy

- 中国人民解放军海军政治委员
- Naval Ensign of the People's Republic of China
- Incumbent; Vacant since October 2025
- Member of: Central Military Commission
- Reports to: The Chairman
- Seat: Beijing
- Nominator: The Chairman
- Appointer: The Chairman
- Formation: 1957
- First holder: Su Zhenhua
- Deputy: Ding Haichun; Wang Dengping

Political Commissar of the People's Liberation Army Navy
- Simplified Chinese: 中国人民解放军海军政治委员
- Traditional Chinese: 中國人民解放軍海軍政治委員
Transcriptions
Standard Mandarin
- Hanyu Pinyin: Zhōngguó Rénmín Jiěfàngjūn Hǎijūn Zhèngzhìweǐyuán

The Political Commissar of the People's Liberation Army Navy is the political head of the People's Liberation Army Navy (PLAN).

The commissar is in charge of building Chinese Communist Party organizations and directing political ideology. The political commissar holds a unique position in the PLAN. This post was created in the Sanwan Reorganization by Mao Zedong in 1927.

== List of Political Commissars ==
No.	Image	Name	Chinese name	Rank	Alma master	Term of Office		Ref
No.	Image	Name	Chinese name	Rank	Alma master	Began	Ended	
1		Su Zhenhua	苏振华	Admiral (1955)	Counter-Japanese Military and Political University	February 1957	June 1967	
2		Li Zuopeng	李作鹏	Vice Admiral (1955)		June 1967	September 1971	
3		Su Zhenhua	苏振华	Admiral (1955)	Counter-Japanese Military and Political University	March 1973	February 1979	
4		Ye Fei	叶飞	Admiral (1955)	Whampoa Military Academy	February 1979	January 1980	
5		Li Yaowen	李耀文	Admiral (1988)	People's Liberation Army Advanced Military Academy	January 1980	April 1990	
6		Wei Jinshan	魏金山	Vice Admiral (1988)		April 1990	November 1993	
7		Zhou Kunren	周坤仁	Admiral (2000)	PLA Nanjing Institute of Politics	November 1993	July 1995	
8		Yang Huaiqing	杨怀庆	Rear admiral (1990); Vice admiral (1994); Admiral (2000)	Central Party School of the Chinese Communist Party	July 1995	June 2003	
9		Hu Yanlin	胡彦林	Rear admiral (1990); Vice admiral (1995); Admiral (2004)	PLA National Defence University	June 2003	July 2008	
10		Liu Xiaojiang	刘晓江	Admiral (2011)	Heilongjiang University	July 2008	December 2014	
11		Miao Hua	苗华	Admiral (2015)	National University of Defense Technology	December 2014	September 2017	
12		Qin Shengxiang	秦生祥	Admiral (2019)		September 2017	January 2022	
13		Yuan Huazhi	袁华智	Admiral (2022)		January 2022	October 2025	
