= Liu Mingli =

Chinese vice admiral

- 刘明利

Political Commissar of the Southern Theater Command Navy
- In office July 2016 – December 2019
- Preceded by: New title
- Succeeded by: Yang Zhiliang

Political Commissar of the South Sea Fleet
- In office December 2014 – January 2016
- Preceded by: Wang Dengping
- Succeeded by: Position revoked

Director of the Political Department of the East Sea Fleet
- In office 2011–2012
- Preceded by: Yu Xianyi
- Succeeded by: Yang Shiguang

Political Commissar of the PLA Naval Research Institute
- In office 2008–2011
- Preceded by: Ma Faxiang
- Succeeded by: Li Daoming

Personal details
- Born: 1956 (age 69–70) Liaoning, China
- Party: Chinese Communist Party

Military service
- Allegiance: People's Republic of China
- Branch/service: People's Liberation Army Navy
- Rank: Vice Admiral

Liu Mingli (simplified Chinese: 刘明利; traditional Chinese: 劉明利; pinyin: Liú Mínglì; born 1956) is a vice admiral (zhong jiang) of the People's Liberation Army Navy (PLAN) of China.

== Biography ==
Liu was born in Liaoning in 1956. He assumed various posts in the People's Liberation Army Navy (PLAN), such as political commissar of PLA Navy Equipment Research Institute, director of Political Department of the East Sea Fleet, and political commissar of Aviation Units of the South Sea Fleet. In December 2014 he was promoted to become political commissar of South Sea Fleet, and he doubles as deputy political commissar of the Southern Theater Command. On July 29, 2016, he was awarded the rank of vice admiral (zhong jiang) by the Central Military Commission.

Military offices
Preceded by Ma Faxiang	Political Commissar of the PLA Naval Research Institute; 2008–2011	Succeeded by Li Daoming
Preceded by Yu Xianyi (余献义)	Director of the Political Department of the East Sea Fleet; 2011–2012	Succeeded by Yang Shiguang
Previous: Wang Dengping	Political Commissar of the South Sea Fleet; 2014–2016	Succeeded by Position revoked
New title	Political Commissar of the Southern Theater Command Navy; 2016–2019	Succeeded by Yang Zhiliang
