= Political Department of the People's Liberation Army Navy =

Department of the Chinese Communist Party's navy

Director of the Political Department of the People's Liberation Army Navy
- 中国人民解放军海军政治部主任 (Chinese)
- Naval Ensign of the People's Republic of China
- Incumbent; Yang Shiguang since December 2014
- Member of: Central Military Commission
- Reports to: The Chairman
- Seat: Beijing
- Nominator: The Chairman
- Appointer: The Chairman
- Formation: April 1950
- First holder: Liu Daosheng
- Deputy: Zhu Qian; Kang Fei

The Political Department of the People's Liberation Army Navy (simplified Chinese: 中国人民解放军海军政治部; traditional Chinese: 中國人民解放軍海軍政治部; pinyin: Zhōngguó Rénmín Jiěfàngjūn Hǎijūn Zhèngzhìbù) is one of the main departments of the People's Liberation Army Navy. Its director is ranked at the deputy military region grade (副大军区级).

== List of directors ==
No.	Image	Name	Chinese name	Rank	Alma mater	Term of Office		Ref
No.	Image	Name	Chinese name	Rank	Alma mater	Began	Ended	
1		Liu Daosheng	刘道生	Vice Admiral (1955)	Voroshilov Naval Academy	April 1950	November 1953	
2		Su Zhenhua	苏振华	Admiral (1955)	Counter-Japanese Military and Political University	November 1953	February 1957	
3		Duan Dezhang	段德彰	Rear admiral (1955)	Counter-Japanese Military and Political University	February 1957	June 1962	
4		Zhang Xiuchuan	张秀川	Rear admiral (1955)	People's Liberation Army Advanced Military Academy	June 1962	August 1968	
5		Zhang Jingyi	张敬一	Commodore (1955)	Central Party School of the Chinese Communist Party	December 1968	November 1971	
6		Liu Juying	刘居英	Rear admiral (1955)	Peking University	May 1972	August 1975	
7		Wang Xin	王昕	Commodore (1955)		August 1975	May 1978	
8		Deng Chubai	邓楚白	Commodore (1962)		May 1978	January 1981	
9		Li Junyan	李君彦	Rear admiral (1961)	People's Liberation Army Advanced Military Academy	February 1981	August 1982	
10		Liu Youfa	刘友发	Vice admiral (1955)	Counter-Japanese Military and Political University	August 1982	July 1985	
11		Tong Guorong	佟国荣	Vice admiral (1988)	Zhongnan University of Economics and Law	July 1985	November 1992	
12		Yang Huaiqing	杨怀庆	Rear admiral (1990); Vice admiral (1994); Admiral (2000)	Central Party School of the Chinese Communist Party	November 1992	December 1993	
13		Hu Yanlin	胡彦林	Rear admiral (1990); Vice admiral (1995); Admiral (2004)	PLA National Defence University	December 1993	June 2000	
14		Bi Huiyi	毕惠义	Rear admiral (1992); Vice admiral (2001)	Heilongjiang University	June 2000	December 2004	
15		Tong Shiping	童世平	Rear admiral (1998); Vice admiral (2004); Admiral (2010)	PLA University of National Defence	December 2004	December 2005	
16		Fan Yinhua	范印华	Rear admiral (1998); Vice admiral (2007)	Central Party School of the Chinese Communist Party	December 2005	July 2008	
17		Xu Jianzhong	徐建中	Rear admiral (1998); Vice admiral (2007)	Central Party School of the Chinese Communist Party	July 2008	June 2009	
18		Wang Zhaohai	王兆海	Rear admiral (2004); Vice admiral (2009)	Sichuan University	June 2009	June 2011	
19		Ma Faxiang	马发祥	Rear admiral (2005); Vice admiral (2012)		June 2011	July 2013	
20		Ding Haichun	丁海春	Rear admiral (2007); Vice admiral (2013)		July 2013	December 2014	
21		Yang Shiguang	杨世光	Rear admiral (2010); Vice admiral (2016)		December 2014		
