= Chinese research ship Beidiao 992 =

Chinese naval auxiliary ship

History

PRC

General characteristics
- Class & type: Beidiao 992
- Electronic warfare & decoys: None
- Armament: Unarmed
- Aircraft carried: None
- Aviation facilities: None

Chinese research ship Beidiao 992 is a very little known naval auxiliary ship currently in service with the People's Liberation Army Navy (PLAN). The exact type remain unknown as late 2010s despite years of service, because official governmental information in details has not been released. The ship is mainly used for oceanographic research and it is one of the first ships in Chinese navy that adopts catamaran design.

Beidiao 992 research ship in PLAN service is designated by a combination of two Chinese characters followed by three-digit number. The second Chinese character is Diao (调), meaning research in Chinese, because this ship is an oceanographic research ship. The first Chinese character denotes which fleet the ship is service with, with East (Dong, 东) for East Sea Fleet, North (Bei, 北) for North Sea Fleet, and South (Nan, 南) for South Sea Fleet.

Class	Pennant #	Status	Fleet
Beidiao 992 class	Beidiao 992	Active	North Sea Fleet
