= Bai Wenqi =

Chinese naval aviator

- 白文奇

Political Commissar of the Northern Theater Command Air Force
- Incumbent
- Assumed office February 2016
- Preceded by: Office established

Political Commissar of the Jinan Military Region Air Force
- In office July 2015 – January 2016
- Commander: Sun Herong
- Preceded by: Fan Xiaojun
- Succeeded by: Office abolished

Political Commissar of the North Sea Fleet
- In office 2012 – July 2015
- Preceded by: Wang Dengping
- Succeeded by: Kang Fei

Personal details
- Born: October 1955 (age 70) Xingcheng, Liaoning, China
- Party: Chinese Communist Party
- Education: PLA National Defence University

Military service
- Allegiance: China
- Branch/service: People's Liberation Army Air Force
- Years of service: ? − present
- Rank: Lieutenant general

Bai Wenqi (Chinese: 白文奇; born October 1955) is a Chinese naval aviator who is a lieutenant general of the People's Liberation Army Air Force (PLAAF) and a former vice admiral of the People's Liberation Army Naval Air Force (PLANAF). He has been the inaugural political commissar of the Northern Theater Command Air Force since its establishment in February 2016. He formerly served as political commissar of the Jinan Military Region Air Force, and political commissar of the North Sea Fleet.

== Biography ==
Bai Wenqi was born in Xingcheng, Liaoning Province in October 1955. He is of Mongol ethnicity. He has a graduate degree in military science from PLA National Defence University.

Bai has years of experience in the political tracks of both North Sea Fleet (NSF) and South Sea Fleet (SSF) naval aviation units. From early 2004 to 2005, he served as the deputy director of the NSF naval aviation Political Department, based in Qingdao, Shandong Province. From 2005 to 2008, he was the director of the SSF's Naval Aviation Political Department based in Haikou on Hainan Island. He was promoted to the rank of rear admiral in July 2006. In April 2008, he returned to the North Sea Fleet to serve as political commissar of NSF Naval Aviation, and concurrently as a North Sea Fleet deputy political commissar.

Bai was promoted to North Sea Fleet political commissar in 2012, after his predecessor Wang Dengping was transferred to the South Sea Fleet. He also concurrently served as deputy political commissar of the Jinan Military Region, of which NSF is a part. He was the first top-tier commander of the NSF with naval aviation background. In August 2013, he was promoted to the rank of vice admiral (zhong jiang). He is also a member of the 12th National People's Congress.

In July 2015, Bai was transferred from the North Sea Fleet to the Jinan Military Region Air Force to serve as its political commissar. He retained his position as deputy political commissar of Jinan MR. In February 2016, Bai was appointed the inaugural political commissar of the Air Force of the Northern Theater Command, which was newly established in Central Military Commission chairman Xi Jinping's military reform.
