= Nanjiao 90-class dispatch boat =

Class of Chinese naval auxiliary ships

Class overview
- Operators: People's Liberation Army Navy

General characteristics
- Class & type: Nanjiao 90
- Electronic warfare & decoys: None
- Armament: Unarmed
- Aircraft carried: None
- Aviation facilities: None

Nanjiao 90 class dispatch boat is a class of little known naval auxiliary ship formerly in service with the People's Liberation Army Navy (PLAN). The name of this class is after the first unit commissioned, with the exact type still remains unknown, and a total of two units of this class have been confirmed in active service as of mid-2010s. Nanjiao 90 class has a narrow landing ramp built in the bow, the only Chinese naval dispatch boat with this feature (as of mid 2010).

Nanjiao 90 class series ships in PLAN service are designated by a combination of two Chinese characters followed by three-digit number. The second Chinese character is Jiao (交), short for Jiao-Tong-Ting (交通艇), meaning dispatch boat (ferry) in Chinese, because these ships are classified as dispatch boats. The first Chinese character denotes which fleet the ship is service with, with East (Dong, 东) for East Sea Fleet, North (Bei, 北) for North Sea Fleet, and South (Nan, 南) for South Sea Fleet. However, the pennant numbers may have changed due to the change of Chinese naval ships naming convention.

In 2022, both boats were decommissioned.

Class	Pennant #	Status	Fleet
Nanjiao 90 class	Nan-Jiao 90	Retired	South Sea Fleet
Nanjiao 90 class	Nan-Jiao 91	Retired	South Sea Fleet
