= Dongleng-class reefer ship =

Class of naval auxiliary ship

Class overview
- Operators: People's Liberation Army Navy

General characteristics
- Displacement: 1,290 long tons (1,310 t)
- Length: 60.5 m (198 ft 6 in)
- Beam: 9 m (29 ft 6 in)
- Draught: 4 m (13 ft 1 in)
- Propulsion: 6DRN marine diesel engines, 750 hp (559 kW)
- Speed: 15 knots (28 km/h; 17 mph)
- Complement: 35
- Armament: Four 25 mm (0.98 in) guns and; four 14.5 mm (0.57 in) machine guns

Dongleng (东冷, meaning East Cold)-class reefer ship is a class of naval auxiliary ship currently in service with the People's Liberation Army Navy (PLAN), and at least thirteen units were completed and entered service with PLAN from 1960 through 1962. This class can carry between seven hundred to eight hundred tons of frozen cargo.

Dongleng-class ships in PLAN service are designated by a combination of two Chinese characters followed by three-digit number. The second Chinese character is Leng (冷), meaning cold in Chinese, because these ships are classified as refrigerator ship. The first Chinese character denotes which fleet the ship is service with, with East (Dong, 东) for East Sea Fleet, North (Bei, 北) for North Sea Fleet, and South (Nan, 南) for South Sea Fleet. However, the pennant numbers may have changed due to the change of Chinese naval ships naming convention. These ships are being retired in since early 2010s.

Class	Pennant #	Commissioned	Status	Fleet
Dongleng	Bei-Leng 531	1960 -1962	Active	North Sea Fleet
Dongleng	Bei-Leng 591	1960 - 1962	Active	North Sea Fleet
Dongleng	Bei-Leng 592	1960 -1962	Active	North Sea Fleet
Dongleng	Bei-Leng 594	1960 - 1962	Active	North Sea Fleet
Dongleng	Dong-Leng 794	1960 -1962	Active	East Sea Fleet
Dongleng	Nan-Leng 972	1960 - 1962	Active	South Sea Fleet
Dongleng	Nan-Leng 975	1960 - 1962	Active	South Sea Fleet
