= Wang Zhaohai =

Retired Chinese vice admiral

- 王兆海

Deputy Political Commissar of the PLA Navy
- In office July 2011 – July 2013 Serving with Cen Xu, Wang Sentai
- Political Commissar: Liu Xiaojiang
- Succeeded by: Ma Faxiang

Personal details
- Born: January 1950 (age 76) Jianhu County, Jiangsu, China
- Party: Chinese Communist Party
- Education: Sichuan University

Military service
- Allegiance: Chinese Communist Party
- Branch/service: People's Liberation Army Navy
- Years of service: 1970−2013
- Rank: Vice Admiral

Wang Zhaohai (Chinese: 王兆海; pinyin: Wāng Zhàohaǐ; born January 1950) is a retired vice admiral (zhong jiang) who served as Deputy Political Commissar of the People's Liberation Army Navy (PLAN). He was also Vice President of the China Federation of Literary and Art Circles.

== Biography ==
Wang was born January 1950 in Jianhu County in East China's Jiangsu Province. He graduated from the Chinese Department of Sichuan University.

Wang joined the PLA Navy at age 20, taking a clerical position with the North Sea Fleet Logistics Department. He later joined a navy engineering battalion, and, after joining the Chinese Communist Party (CCP) in 1972, he became a battalion CCP secretary. He was later appointed secretary of the Propaganda Office of the North Sea Fleet Logistics Department's Political Department. In 1977, Wang began a 15-year-long rise through the ranks of People's Navy, the official newspaper of the PLA Navy, of which he eventually became assistant editor-in-chief.

After leaving People's Navy in 1992, Wang became vice-secretary-general (秘书长) of the PLA Navy Political Department, and director of the Political Department's Cultural Department. In 2000, he was appointed deputy director of the PLA General Political Department's Propaganda Department, where he was in charge of cultural work. He was promoted to the rank of rear admiral in July 2001. In 2004, he became director of the Political Department of the PLA Academy of Military Science (AMS), and in 2008, he became a deputy commandant at AMS.

In 2009, Wang became director of the PLA Navy Political Department, and attained the rank of vice admiral. He was promoted to deputy political commissar in July 2011. He retired two years later, in July 2013.

== Publications ==
Wang has written for military publications such as Army-Party Life and PLA Daily. He has also published essays in high-level CCP periodicals such as Study Times and Qiushi. His essays often discuss the importance of political work. He is an honorary member of the China Federation of Literary and Art Circles (CFLAC), a CCP-affiliated association of writers and artists. He served as vice-president of CFLAC for a period starting in December 2001.

Military offices
Previous: Xu Jianzhong	Director of the Political Department of the PLA Navy; 2009–2011	Next: Ma Faxiang
