= Type 645 tanker =

Chinese tanker ship

Class overview
- Operators: People's Liberation Army Navy

General characteristics
- Displacement: 530 long tons (540 t)
- Length: 49 m (160 ft 9 in)
- Beam: 7.5 m (24 ft 7 in)
- Draught: 3 m (9 ft 10 in)
- Propulsion: 1 × marine diesel engine, single shaft
- Speed: 10 knots (19 km/h; 12 mph)
- Complement: 19
- Armament: 14.5 mm (0.57 in) machine guns

Type 645 tanker is a type of naval auxiliary ship currently in service with the People's Liberation Army Navy (PLAN), and this type has received NATO reporting name as Guangzhou class. Originally designed as a coastal oiler that is capable of transport both water and oil, around twenty-three entered service, with four as water tankers and sixteen as oilers. This class has begun to be retired from active military service in the mid-2010s.

Type 645 series ships in PLAN service are designated by a combination of two Chinese characters followed by three-digit number. The second Chinese character is You (油), meaning oil in Chinese, or Shui (水), meaning water, because these ships are classified either as oil and water tankers. The first Chinese character denotes which fleet the ship is service with, with East (Dong, 东) for East Sea Fleet, North (Bei, 北) for North Sea Fleet, and South (Nan, 南) for South Sea Fleet. However, the pennant numbers are subject to change due to changes of Chinese naval ships naming convention, or units are transferred to different fleets. As of early 2020s, all oiler version have retired, and only four water tanker (AWT) version remains in service.

Type	Pennant #	Status	Fleet
645	Bei-Shui 590	Active	North Sea Fleet
645	Bei-Shui 593	Active	North Sea Fleet
645	Bei-You 571	Retired	North Sea Fleet
645	Dong-Shui 645	Active	East Sea Fleet
645	Dong-You 624	Retired	East Sea Fleet
645	Nan-Shui 954	Retired	South Sea Fleet
Oilers	Various	Retired	All fleets
