= Beituo 617-class tug =

Chinese naval auxiliary ship class

Class overview
- Operators: People's Liberation Army Navy

General characteristics
- Class & type: Beituo 617
- Electronic warfare & decoys: None
- Armament: Unarmed
- Aircraft carried: None
- Aviation facilities: None

The Beituo 617 class tug is a little known class of naval auxiliary currently in service with the People's Liberation Army Navy (PLAN). The name of this class is taken from that of the first unit commissioned, with the exact type still remaining unknown; a total of two of this class have been confirmed as being in active service as of the mid-2010s. The Beituo 617 class is a single deck design with a two level superstructure, a platform is atop of the second level.

The Beituo 617 class ships in PLAN service are designated by a combination of two Chinese characters followed by three-digit number. The second Chinese character is Tuo (拖), meaning tug in Chinese, because these ships are classified as tugboats. The first Chinese character denotes which fleet the ship is service with, with East (Dong, 东) for East Sea Fleet, North (Bei, 北) for North Sea Fleet, and South (Nan, 南) for South Sea Fleet. However, the pennant numbers may have changed due to the change of Chinese naval ships naming convention.

Class	Pennant #	Status	Fleet
Beituo 617 class	Bei-Tuo 617	Active	North Sea Fleet
Beituo 617 class	Bei-Tuo 655	Active	North Sea Fleet
