= Nangong 681-class floating pile driver =

Chinese naval auxiliary ship class

Class overview
- Operators: People's Liberation Army Navy

General characteristics
- Class & type: Nangong 681
- Electronic warfare & decoys: None
- Armament: Unarmed
- Aircraft carried: None
- Aviation facilities: None

Nangong 681 class floating pile driver is a class of little known naval auxiliary ship currently in service with the People's Liberation Army Navy (PLAN). The name of this class is after the first unit commissioned, with the exact type remains unknown, and only a single unit of this class have been confirmed in active service as of mid-2010s.

Nangong 681 class series ships in PLAN service are designated by a combination of two Chinese characters followed by three-digit number. The second Chinese character is Gong (工), short for Gong-Cheng (工程), meaning engineering in Chinese, because these ships are ships built for engineering projects. The first Chinese character denotes which fleet the ship is service with, with East (Dong, 东) for East Sea Fleet, North (Bei, 北) for North Sea Fleet, and South (Nan, 南) for South Sea Fleet. However, the pennant numbers may have changed due to the change of Chinese naval ships naming convention. Nangong 681 class floating pile driver can also be used as a crane ship.

Class	Pennant #	Status	Fleet
Nangong 681 class	Nan-Gong 681	Active	South Sea Fleet
