= Cen Xu =

Chinese vice admiral

- 岑旭

Deputy Political Commissar of the PLA Navy
- In office December 2011 – December 2012 Serving with Wang Zhaohai
- Political Commissar: Liu Xiaojiang
- Succeeded by: Wang Sentai

Political Commissar of the East Sea Fleet
- In office July 2009 – December 2011
- Preceded by: Xu Jianzhong
- Succeeded by: Ding Haichun

Personal details
- Born: August 1952 (age 73) Beijing, China
- Party: Chinese Communist Party

Military service
- Allegiance: China
- Branch/service: People's Liberation Army Navy
- Years of service: ?−present
- Rank: Vice Admiral

Cen Xu (Chinese: 岑旭; born August 1952) is a vice admiral (zhong jiang) of China's People's Liberation Army Navy. He has been assistant to the director of the PLA General Political Department since January 2013, and formerly served as a Deputy Political Commissar of the PLA Navy and Political Commissar of the Navy's East Sea Fleet.

== Biography ==
Cen Xu was born in Beijing in August 1952. He is of Rudong, Jiangsu ancestry.

Little information is publicly known on Cen's career prior to July 2000, when he became political commissar of Navy Equipment Proving Research Center (海军装备论证研究中心), the PLA Navy's main institution for developing and testing weapons, ships, and other technical systems. In 2003 this institution's name was changed to Navy Equipment Research Institute (海军装备研究院).

In late 2004, Cen was promoted to deputy political commissar of the South Sea Fleet, and concurrently political commissar of South Sea Fleet naval aviation. In 2008, Cen was promoted to political commissar of the East Sea Fleet. He was also made a concurrent deputy political commissar of the Nanjing Military Region. While in this position, he worked alongside VADM Xu Hongmeng and VADM Du Jingchen, and East Sea Fleet Commander VADM Su Zhiqian.

Cen attained the rank of rear admiral in July 2002 and vice admiral in July 2009.

In December 2011, Cen was promoted to deputy political commissar of the PLA Navy. He served in that position for less than a year before being appointed assistant to the director of the PLA General Political Department, a deputy-military-region-level position, in January 2013.

The Hong Kong newspaper Ta Kung Pao has called Cen "a leader in naval scientific research and armaments." Cen was appointed to the 18th Central Commission for Discipline Inspection (CCDI), the Chinese Communist Party's main organization responsible for monitoring the performance of CCP members, and policing them for breaches in CCP regulations and discipline.
