= Beituo 702-class tug =

Chinese naval auxiliary ship class

Class overview
- Operators: People's Liberation Army Navy

General characteristics
- Class & type: Beituo 702
- Electronic warfare & decoys: None
- Armament: Unarmed
- Aircraft carried: None
- Aviation facilities: None

Beituo 702 class tug is a class of little known naval auxiliary ship currently in service with the People's Liberation Army Navy (PLAN). The name of this class is after the first unit commissioned, with the exact type still remains unknown, and only a single unit of this class have been confirmed in active service as of mid-2010s.

Beituo 702 class series ships in PLAN service are designated by a combination of two Chinese characters followed by three-digit number. The second Chinese character is Tuo (拖), meaning tug in Chinese, because these ships are classified as tugboats. The first Chinese character denotes which fleet the ship is service with, with East (Dong, 东) for East Sea Fleet, North (Bei, 北) for North Sea Fleet, and South (Nan, 南) for South Sea Fleet. However, the pennant numbers may have changed due to the change of Chinese naval ships naming convention. Beituo 702 is also used as a fire fighting ship.

Class	Pennant #	Status	Fleet
Beituo 702 class	Bei-Tuo 702	Active	North Sea Fleet
