= Beiqi 384-class crane ship =

Chinese naval auxiliary ship class

Class overview
- Operators: People's Liberation Army Navy

General characteristics
- Class & type: Beiqi 384
- Electronic warfare & decoys: None
- Armament: Unarmed
- Aircraft carried: None
- Aviation facilities: None

Beiqi 384 class crane ship is a class of naval auxiliary ship currently in service with the People's Liberation Army Navy (PLAN). The name of this class is after the first unit commissioned, with the exact type still remains unknown, and only a single unit of this class have been confirmed in active service as of mid-2010s.

Beiqi 384 class series ships in PLAN service are designated by a combination of two Chinese characters followed by three-digit number. The second Chinese character is Qi (起), short for Qi-Zhong (起重), because these ships are classified as crane ships. The first Chinese character denotes which fleet the ship is service with, with East (Dong, 东) for East Sea Fleet, North (Bei, 北) for North Sea Fleet, and South (Nan, 南) for South Sea Fleet. However, the pennant numbers may have changed due to the change of Chinese naval ships naming convention.

Class	Pennant #	Status	Fleet
Beiqi 384 class	Bei-Qi 384	Active	North Sea Fleet
