= Tuqiang-class tug =

Class of Chinese auxiliary ship

History

PRC

General characteristics
- Class & type: Tuqiang class
- Type: Sea-going tug (ATA)
- Propulsion: Marine diesel engine, 9,000 hp (6,711 kW)
- Electronic warfare & decoys: None
- Armament: Unarmed
- Aircraft carried: None
- Aviation facilities: None

Tuqiang class tug is a class of little known naval auxiliary ship currently in service with the People's Liberation Army Navy (PLAN). The exact type still remains unknown, because the only official information released by the Chinese government is that this class is a new generation of 9000-hp class sea-going rescue tug, but this tug has received NATO reporting name Tuqiang class, or 图强 in Chinese, meaning Making determined efforts to do well. A total of three of this class of sea-going tug (ATA) have been confirmed in active service as of the mid-2010s.

Tuqiang-class tugs in PLAN service are designated by a combination of two Chinese characters followed by three-digit number. The second Chinese character is Tuo (拖), meaning tug in Chinese, because these ships are classified as tugboats. The first Chinese character denotes which fleet the ship is service with, with East (Dong, 东) for East Sea Fleet, North (Bei, 北) for North Sea Fleet, and South (Nan, 南) for South Sea Fleet. However, the pennant numbers may have changed due to the change of Chinese naval ships naming convention, or when units are transferred to different fleets.

Class	Pennant #	Status	Fleet
Nantuo 181 class	Nan-Tuo 181	Active	South Sea Fleet
Nantuo 181 class	Nan-Tuo 189	Active	South Sea Fleet
Nantuo 181 class	Bei-Tuo 721	Active	North Sea Fleet
