= Jiang Zhonghua =

Chinese rear admiral (died 2014)

- 姜中华
- Died: 2 September 2014; Zhoushan, Zhejiang, China
- Military career
- Allegiance: People's Republic of China
- Branch: People's Liberation Army Navy
- Rank: Rear Admiral
- Unit: South Sea Fleet
- Commands: Head of the armament department of the South Sea Fleet

Jiang Zhonghua (Chinese: 姜中华; died 2 September 2014) was a rear admiral (shao jiang) of the People's Liberation Army Navy (PLAN) of China, who served as head of the armament department of the South Sea Fleet. He died by suicide in September 2014.

Jiang was a native of Zhoushan, Zhejiang Province. He once served as commander of the Yulin Naval Base in Hainan, where China's nuclear submarines are based. In 2013, Jiang commanded the Chinese Escort Task Group 999 in the Gulf of Aden, which worked with the multinational Combined Task Force 151 to combat piracy off the coast of Somalia.

On 2 September 2014, Jiang Zhonghua jumped to his death from Yidong Kaili Hotel (怡東凱麗酒店) in Zhoushan. Jiang was believed to have come under investigation for corruption by the Central Discipline Inspection Commission, and may have died by suicide to avoid disgrace and allow his family to receive his retirement benefits, or to avoid implicating his superiors. There was no official announcement regarding his death. About two months later, Vice Admiral Ma Faxiang died by suicide in Beijing under similar circumstances. Both Jiang and Ma are thought to be connected to the corruption cases of the former vice chairmen of the Central Military Commission, Xu Caihou and Guo Boxiong.
