= Yao Beina =

Chinese singer and songwriter (1981-2015)

- 姚贝娜
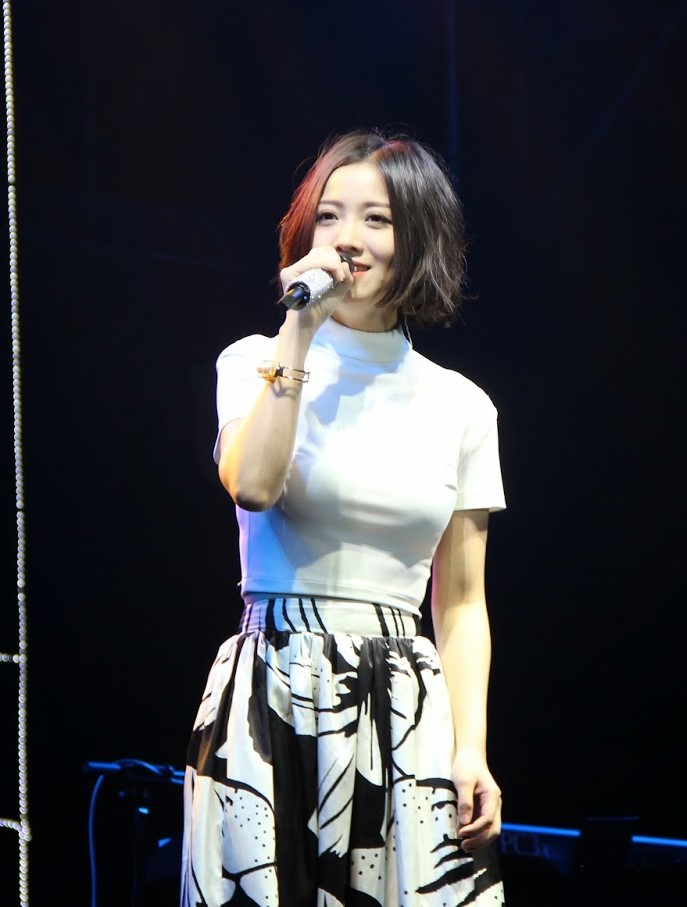
- Yao Beina in 2014
- Born: September 26, 1981; Wuhan, Hubei, China
- Died: January 16, 2015 (aged 33); Shenzhen, Guangdong, China
- Resting place: Shimenfeng Memorial Park, Wuhan, Hubei, China; 30.514562°N 114.484081°E
- Education: China Conservatory of Music (BMus); The Affiliated High School of Wuhan Conservatory of Music (high school)
- Occupations: Singer; songwriter; producer
- Musical career
- Genres: Mandopop; Chinese folk; rock; R&B; jazz; Chinese opera
- Instrument: Piano
- Years active: 2005–2014
- Website: yaobella.com

Chinese name
- Traditional Chinese: 姚貝娜
- Simplified Chinese: 姚贝娜
Transcriptions
Standard Mandarin
- Hanyu Pinyin: Yáo Bèinà

Yao Beina (simplified Chinese: 姚贝娜; traditional Chinese: 姚貝娜; pinyin: Yáo Bèinà; September 26, 1981 – January 16, 2015), also known as Bella Yao, was a Chinese singer and songwriter. She debuted as a professional singer with her portrayal of the diva of the musical Jin Sha (金沙) in 2005. After graduating from China Conservatory of Music in the same year, she started her singing career in the Song and Dance Ensemble of the Political Department of the People's Liberation Army Navy.

Yao won the champion of pop singing in the 13th CCTV National Young Singer Contest in 2008 by earning the first and the only full score throughout the history of the contest. She performed at the Beijing 2008 Summer Olympics closing ceremony. In June 2009, she retired from the military and transformed into a pop singer. Her first album Yao Beina (姚贝娜), named after herself, was released on June 8, 2012.

Yao was best known for recording the soundtracks and theme songs of movies and TV shows, such as Empresses in the Palace, Painted Skin: The Resurrection, and Back to 1942. She also recorded the Mandarin version of "Let It Go" from Disney's Frozen. In 2013, she was invited to compete in The Voice of China Season 2 and gained great popularity.

== Early life and education ==
Yao was born on September 26, 1981, in Wuhan, Hubei, China, to a family of musicians. Her father, Yao Feng (姚峰; Yáo Fēng), was an associate professor at Wuhan Conservatory of Music and her mother, Li Xinmin (李信敏; Lǐ Xìnmǐn), was a vocalist of the Hubei Song and Dance Ensemble. Yao's first name, Beina, was given by her father as his vocal teaching was greatly inspired by the lectures given by Italian operatic baritone Gino Bechi during his visit to the Central Philharmonic Orchestra in Beijing, China, in September 1981, shortly before Yao's birth.

Yao started learning piano at the age of four under the supervision of her parents. She was first found to have absolute pitch by her father when she was six years old as she could accurately identify keys by listening to the piano, and this ability was validated by several noteworthy musicians during her singing career later. She debuted as a singer on stage at a local television at the age of nine, since when she occasionally performed at galas and contests.

Yao attended Wuhan No. 45 Middle School from 1993 to 1997 when she was determined to make singing a career. She majored in popular music when she was admitted to the Affiliated High School of Wuhan Conservatory of Music as the top scorer in 1997, when her father, the founder of the Department of Vocal Music at Wuhan Conservatory of Music, was the only professor in the major of popular music. To avoid the conflict of interest, her father did not intervene in her admission process and legitimately became her advisor. Due to her father's job transfer to Shenzhen in 1998 and the suspension of the major of popular music therewith, Yao transferred to folk music under Professor Feng Jiahui (冯家慧).

In 2000, Yao was admitted to China Conservatory of Music with the highest score among her class in high school and ranked the seventh among the 15 admitted students nationwide. She continued majoring in folk music in college under Professor Dong Hua (董华) and Professor Ma Qiuhua (马秋华). During her undergraduate years, she was invited to perform at several important galas in China, South Korea, France, and Russia.

== Career ==
=== 2005–2009: Career beginnings and military service ===
In 2005, Yao was selected as the diva of musical Jin Sha (金沙), the plot of which was based on the discovery of the archaeological site Jinsha, and gained recognition from the public. She graduated from China Conservatory of Music in the same year and was admitted to the Song and Dance Ensemble of the Political Department of the People's Liberation Army Navy as the only college student admitted to the military from regular college. In 2006, Yao won the second place of pop singing in the 12th CCTV National Young Singer Contest, the most prestigious singing contest in China at that time, and assisted in Song Zuying's concert at Kennedy Center, Washington D.C. In 2007, she stepped onto the stage of the CCTV New Year's Gala, the biggest and most well-known gala in China, for the first time. She again competed in the 13th CCTV National Young Singer Contest in 2008 and won the championship by earning the first and the only full score throughout the history of the contest. She performed at the Beijing 2008 Summer Olympics closing ceremony.

=== 2009–2013: Pop music and soundtracks ===
In 2009, Yao left the military to pursue her interests in pop music. She was invited by Liu Huan to record the original soundtracks of Empresses in the Palace in 2011. On June 8, 2012, she released her first album named after herself, Yao Beina (姚贝娜), consisting of most songs composed by herself. As of 2012, she recorded original soundtracks and theme songs of over 60 TV shows and films, such as "River of the Life" (生命的河) of Back to 1942 and "Love in the Painting" (画情) of Painted Skin: The Resurrection. In March 2013, Yao was invited to return to the 15th CCTV National Young Singer Contest as the youngest judge.

=== 2013–2014: The Voice of China and breakthrough ===
In 2013, Yao was invited to participate in The Voice of China Season 2. She gained much focus as an already well-known singer and earned great popularity by her skilled vocal control and range. On July 12, 2013 (air date), Yao performed "Maybe Tomorrow" (也许明天) in the blind auditions and was selected by all the four coaches, and she chose coach Na Ying to work with. Yao finally earned the second place within the coach's team and the top 8 of the Season 2. She became the champion of the personal popularity leaderboard online by the end of the competition.

Yao's performance listing in The Voice of China Season 2:

Air Date	Episode	Song	Original Vocalist
July 13, 2013	1	"Maybe Tomorrow" (也许明天)	A-Mei
August 16, 2013	6	"Reflection" (自己)	Lea Salonga; Coco Lee
September 13, 2013	10	"Maybe Still" (也许在)	Sun Nan
September 20, 2013	11	"Hold" (把握)	Su Rui
September 20, 2013	11	"Dear Friend"	Shunza
September 20, 2013	11	"All by Myself"	Eric Carmen

Yao's career breakthrough came after her competition in The Voice of China. On December 9, 2013, her extended play Half of Me (1/2的我) was released. On January 22, 2014, the music video of the Mandarin version of "Let It Go" (随它吧) from Disney's Frozen recorded by Yao was released by Walt Disney Records. On January 31, 2014, the Chinese New Year's Eve, Yao's solo performance, "Glorious China" (天耀中华), took center stage at the CCTV New Year's Gala just before the first bell ring of the Chinese New Year. On April 26, 2014, she was awarded the Best Female Singer and the Top 10 Annual Songs with her single "Fire of the Heart" (心火) by MusicRadio China TOP Music Charts.

== Illness, death, and philanthropy ==
In April 2011, Yao noticed a faint trace resembling a dimple on her left breast and visited several hospitals for diagnosis, yet no examination results showed abnormalities. With her experience of treating atypical hyperplasia when she was in college, Yao doubted the good results and returned to Dr. Cao Yingming (曹迎明) from the People's Hospital Affiliated to Peking University, the only doctor who recommended surgery. She was admitted to the hospital on the same day as her visit and decided to remove her whole left breast without hesitation. She mentioned that experience in an interview, "People say my decision was rare, but I don't think there is anything special. Breast diseases are common nowadays. Instead of worrying and being afraid to preserve the breast, it's better to cleanly cut it off." On May 31, 2011, Yao underwent an eight-hour surgery for breast removal and reconstruction, followed by eight sessions of chemotherapy in three months. On August 2, 2011, with a PICC line on her right arm, she performed in a concert at Hubei TV. Later in the same month, she recorded soundtracks for Empresses in the Palace. In both 2012 and 2013, Yao participated in the Pink Ribbon charity events organized by Trends Health (时尚健康) magazine; on September 26, 2013, her 32nd birthday, she released the covers of Trends Health she photographed in the nude with the slogan "That scar is my exclusive pink medal" (“那道疤是我独有的粉红勋章”) and became a spokesperson for the Pink Ribbon, hoping to leverage her personal experiences and influence to raise awareness about breast health. On the same day, she was designated as the Anti-Cancer Advocacy Ambassador for Beijing Cancer Hospital. By sharing her own experiences treating breast cancer, she aimed to inspire the patients to build confidence to overcome the disease. On December 9, 2013, Yao released the extended play Half of Me (1/2的我), including a song "Fire of the Heart" (心火) describing her struggle and pain when she fought breast cancer in the past two years.

On June 27, 2014, Yao's medical examination revealed that the cancer cells had spread to her bones and liver. After a month of rest and contemplation, she declined the doctor's recommendation for another round of chemotherapy and returned to work. On October 23, 2014, despite coughing up blood backstage, Yao performed "Fish" (鱼), the finale of her stage career, at the recording scene of the musical reality TV show Hi Song. On October 26, 2014, she completed the final live show in her life before returning to Shenzhen for medical treatment.

Yao was admitted to the hospital affiliated to Peking University in Shenzhen in December 2014. On December 26, 2014, Yao was transferred to the intensive care unit due to her deteriorating conditions. She expressed her wish to donate her body about 20 days before her death. Considering that most of her organs had been impacted by cancer, her parents, on her behalf, signed a consent to voluntary corneal donation on January 9, 2015. Yao died at 4:55 pm CST on January 16, 2015, aged 33. Two hours after her death, the corneal removal surgery was completed. Yao's corneas has restored sight for four people and can help at least two more patients.

In April 2015, Yao's parents auctioned over 600 items of Yao's personal belongings. A series of six auctions titled "Let Love Endure with the Angel Among Us" (“天使在人间——让爱延续”) achieved white glove sales (100% of the lots sold), and the proceeds in total reached RMB 2,511,027.16 yuan, all donated to the Secondary School of Tashkurgan, Xinjiang, China, and dedicated to renovations, music classrooms, and scholarships to support music education in rural area.

On June 14, 2015, Yao was posthumously titled the Moral Exemplar of Guangdong and nominated for the National Moral Exemplar by the government of Guangdong.

== Legacy and commemorations ==
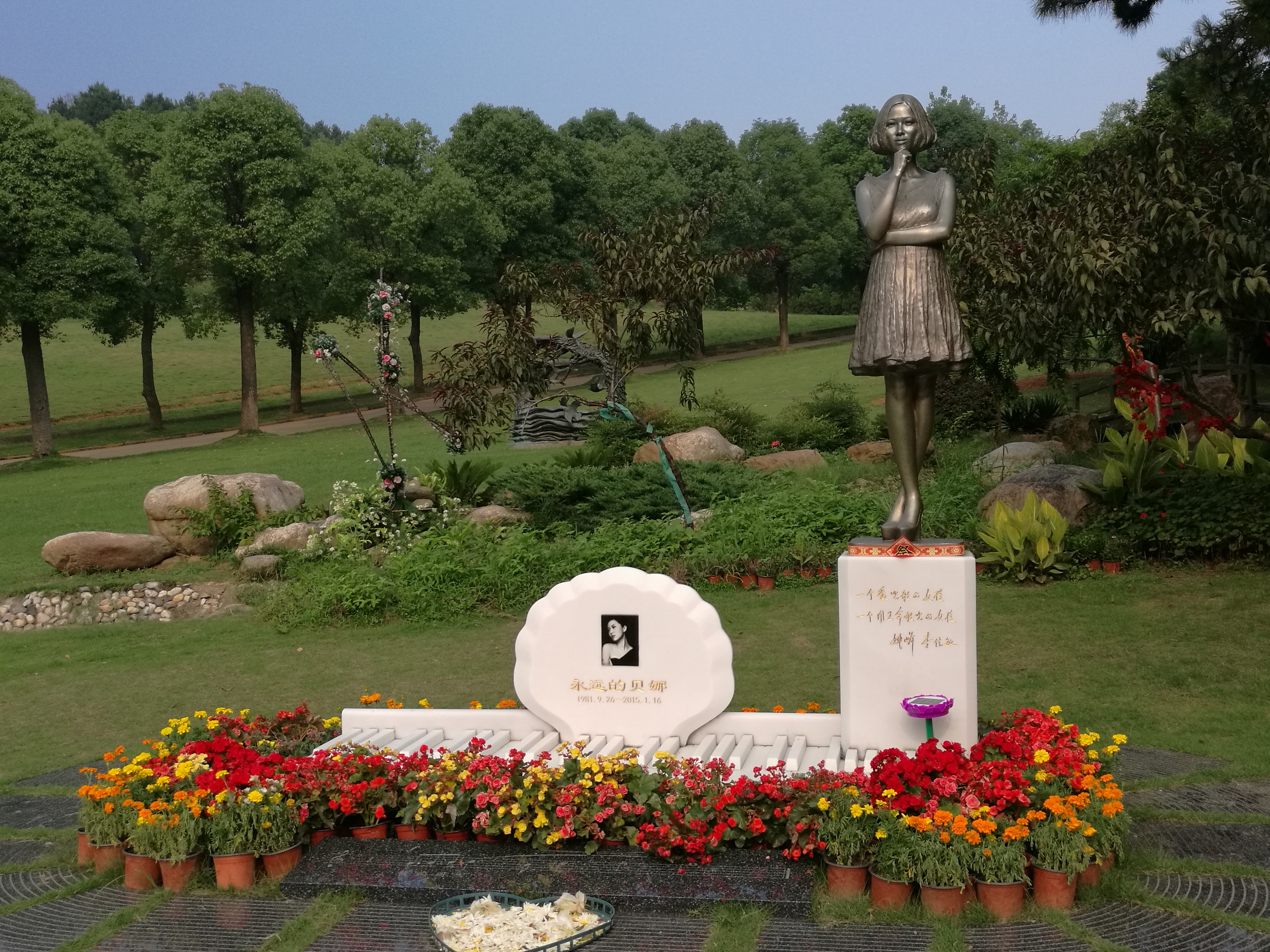
Grave of Yao Beina

Yao's funeral was held at Shenzhen Funeral Home on January 20, 2015. Her memorial service was held at 751 D·PARK in Beijing on April 2, 2015, joined by her former colleagues and friends. Yao's ashes was interred in the Shimenfeng Memorial Park in Wuhan, China, her hometown, in September 2015. On September 26, 2015, Yao's first posthumous birthday, her gravestone and statue were unveiled. Her gravestone is shaped like a seashell as her fans are called "seashells" (贝壳), and it stands on a piano keyboard of 34 keys, representing her age. The main body of the statue is cast in cupronickel with a base height of 0.926 meters and an overall height of 1.81 meters, a deliberate reference to Yao's date of birth (September 26, 1981); on the base of the statue is an inscription by Yao's parents: "A girl who loves to sing, a girl who sings with her life" (一个爱唱歌的女孩，一个用生命歌唱的女孩).

On April 9, 2015, the International Astronomical Union (IAU) Minor Planet Center officially named the asteroid No. 41981 as Yaobeina in memory of Yao, suggested by William Kwong Yu Yeung, an amateur astronomer who first discovered this asteroid at Desert Beaver on December 28, 2000. IAU describes Yao as:

Yaobeina (1981-2015) was a talented and courageous Chinese singer who won numerous awards for the best Chinese pop song performance. One of Yao's famous songs, “Fire of the Heart”, was about the reflections on her battle with breast cancer. She donated her corneas.

Yao's first posthumous album, Eternal (永存), was released on April 15, 2015, including 12 songs recorded around 2009 but had not been released. Her second posthumous album, Born Proud (天生骄傲), was released on September 26, 2015, her first posthumous birthday, including three complete songs (two singles already released and one newly recorded), five demos, and three hummings as the lyrics were unfinished before her death. The cover of the album is a feather gown designed by Yao for her planned album photo shoots. Her last unreleased single, "Glory" (风光), was released on January 16, 2016, one-year anniversary of her death.

Yao's fans produced a memorial album, Extraordinary (不凡), including a song for which her fans composed and the lyrics written by Yao was adopted. The album was released on QQ Music on June 8, 2018.

Yao wished to perform in the musical reality TV show I Am a Singer produced by Hunan Television when she was alive. On April 12, 2019, in the finals of Singer Season 7, Liu Huan (刘欢), the writer and producer of the soundtracks of Empresses in the Palace, performed a medley of three of Yao's songs, "Golden Silk Blouse" (金缕衣), "Bodhisattva" (菩萨蛮), and "Flying Phoenix" (凤凰于飞), by playing Yao's vocal track in "Golden Silk Blouse" (金缕衣) at the beginning and the end of his performance in memory of her. On August 30, 2019, in Super-Vocal Season 2 Episode 7, Zheng Qiyuan (郑棋元), who co-cast the musical Jin Sha (金沙) with Yao in 2005, added Yao's vocal track during the performance of "Someday" (总有一天), one of the songs in that musical.

Yao's biography, Yao Beina: A Girl Who Sang with Her Life (姚贝娜：一个用生命歌唱的女孩), was released on September 26, 2022, her 41st birthday.

== Discography ==
=== Albums ===
==== Born Proud (天生骄傲) ====
Release date: September 26, 2015

No.	Title	Lyrics	Music	Length
1.	"Ring" (戒指)	Zheng Nan, Zhang Pengpeng	Zheng Nan	04:34
2.	"Light" (光)	Hou Lei, Lin Qingrang	Hou Lei	03:48
3.	"Double You" (两个你)	Liu Jiaze	Yan Xiaojian	04:09
4.	"If Without You" (如果没有你)	Jin Wenqi	Jin Wenqi	04:40
5.	"Obsessed" (迷恋)	Lyu Hui	Li Yu	03:02
6.	"Road" (路)	Cang Yanbin	Cang Yanbin	03:26
7.	"Let It Go" (随它吧)	Chen Shaoqi	Kristen Anderson-Lopez, Robert Lopez	03:44
8.	"Time Flies" (时间都去哪儿了)	Chen Xi	Dong Dongdong	03:53
9.	"3.12"	n/a	n/a	03:47
10.	"12.18"	n/a	n/a	04:40
11.	"Mr. Unexpected" (Mr 意外)	n/a	Yao Beina	02:56

==== Eternal (永存) ====
Release date: April 15, 2015

All tracks are written by Liu Jiachang.

No.	Title	Length
1.	"Frank" (坦诚)	04:58
2.	"Miss You" (念你)	03:41
3.	"The Heart" (连心)	04:57
4.	"Forget" (一笔勾销)	03:41
5.	"Decap" (开瓶)	03:37
6.	"Depend on Myself" (靠自己)	04:24
7.	"Helpless Four Seasons" (无奈的四季)	04:47
8.	"Rain of Last Night" (昨夜的雨)	04:22
9.	"So We" (所以才)	03:42
10.	"Mercy" (慈恩)	03:25
11.	"So Cool" (你真酷)	03:46
12.	"Mist" (雾)	04:50

==== Yao Beina (姚贝娜) ====
Release date: May 30, 2012

No.	Title	Lyrics	Music	Length
1.	"Little Hair" (小头发)	Yao Beina	Yao Beina	04:32
2.	"If We Have Not Met" (如果我们没有遇见)	Yao Beina	Yao Beina	04:19
3.	"Blossom in the Dream" (梦里开的花)	Zhao Beibei	Cheng Muen	04:00
4.	"What I Want is Simple" (我要的很简单)	Zhao Beibei, Yao Beina	Zhao Beibei	03:55
5.	"Lotus" (莲)	Yao Beina	Yao Beina	04:37
6.	"Not Smart" (不聪明)	Yao Beina	Yao Beina	05:21
7.	"Life of Flower" (一生花)	Ji Chuzhen	Yao Beina	03:32
8.	"Cloud Asleep" (睡着了的云)	Yao Beina	Sha Baoliang	04:48
9.	"Only Because of Love" (只因为爱)	Lao Mo	Sha Baoliang	04:14
10.	"Sound of Melancholy" (一声忧伤)	Xie Di	Sha Baoliang	04:41
11.	"May I" (可以不可以)	Zhao Beibei, Lao Mo, Yao Beina	Zhao Beibei	04:19

=== Extended plays ===
==== Still in Love (依爱) ====
Release date: April 29, 2014

No.	Title	Lyrics	Music	Length
1.	"Still in Love" (依爱)	Jin Fang	Lin Hai	05:49

==== Half of Me (1/2的我) ====
Release date: December 9, 2013

No.	Title	Lyrics	Music	Length
1.	"Fire of the Heart" (心火)	Wen Ya	Cui Di	04:21
2.	"Don't Sing Love Song" (不唱情歌)	Zhou Zicong	Huang Yunling	04:15
3.	"Love Whatsoever" (爱无反顾)	Tang Tian	Liang Qiaobai	04:53
4.	"World of War" (战争世界)	Tang Xiangzhi	Tang Xiangzhi	03:19

==== The River of Live (生命的河) ====
Release date: November 21, 2012

No.	Title	Lyrics	Music	Length
1.	"River of Life" (生命的河)	Lyu Xiaomin	Zhao Jiping	02:54

==== Just Because of Love (只因为爱) ====
Release date: September 6, 2010

No.	Title	Lyrics	Music	Length
1.	"Just Because of Love" (只因为爱)	Lao Mo	Sha Baoliang	03:25

==== Too Late (来不及) ====
Release date: November 3, 2009

No.	Title	Lyrics	Music	Length
1.	"Too Late" (来不及)	Yao Beina	Yao Beina	04:21
2.	"One Heard, the World Heard" (.一个人听见全世界听见)	Wu Xiangfei	Qu Shicong	03:59
3.	"Internal Injury" (暗伤)	Luo Qian	Yao Beina	03:41

==== Heart as the Moon (心如明月) ====
Release date: September 16, 2008

No.	Title	Lyrics	Music	Length
1.	"Heart as the Moon" (心如明月)	Yu Zi	Hu Xudong	04:03

== Awards ==
Year	Award	Category	Nominated work	Result	Note	Ref.
2015	Huading Awards	Most Popular Female Vocalist	—N/a	Won	Posthumous	
2014	MusicRadio China TOP Charts Awards	Top 10 Gold Songs	"Fire of the Heart" (心火)	Won	—N/a	
2014	MusicRadio China TOP Charts Awards	Best Female Vocalist	—N/a	Won	—N/a	
2014	CCTV New Year's Gala Awards	Most Popular live performance	"Glorious China" (天耀中华)	Won	—N/a	
2013	Sina Weibo Awards	Most Popular Female Vocalist	—N/a	Won	—N/a	
2013	Tencent Weibo Awards	Most Popular Female Vocalist	—N/a	Won	—N/a	
2013	Female Model Prize	Personal	—N/a	Won	—N/a	
2013	Top Chinese Music Awards	Best EP	"Half of Me" (1/2的我)	Won	—N/a	
2013	TV Drama Awards Made in China	Most Popular Female Vocalist	—N/a	Won	—N/a	
2010	CCTV-MTV Music Awards	Best New Vocalist	—N/a	Nominated	—N/a	
2010	Chinese Song Chart-Beijing Pop Music Awards	Best Female Vocalist	—N/a	Nominated	—N/a	
2008	CCTV-MTV Music Awards	Most Popular Vocalist	—N/a	Won	—N/a	
2008	CCTV National Young Singer Contest	Gold Medalist (pop singing)	—N/a	Won	—N/a	
2006	CCTV National Young Singer Contest	Silver Medalist (pop singing)	—N/a	Won	—N/a	
