= Fu Yaoquan =

- 傅耀泉

Political Commissar of the Northern Theater Command Navy
- Incumbent
- Assumed office September 2020
- Commander: Wang Dazhong
- Preceded by: Kang Fei

Personal details
- Born: November 1963 (age 62) Shaoxing, Zhejiang, China
- Party: Chinese Communist Party

Military service
- Allegiance: People's Republic of China
- Branch/service: People's Liberation Army Navy
- Years of service: ?–present
- Rank: Vice admiral

Fu Yaoquan (Chinese: 傅耀泉; born November 1963) is a vice admiral (zhongjiang) of the People's Liberation Army (PLA), serving as political commissar of the Northern Theater Command Navy since September 2020. He is a representative of the 19th National Congress of the Chinese Communist Party.

== Biography ==
Fu was born in Shaoxing, Zhejiang, in November 1963. In September 2014, he became deputy director of the Political Department of East Sea Fleet, concurrently serving as political commissar of the 17th Convoy Formation of the People's Liberation Army Navy in the Gulf of Aden. Three months later, he was appointed political commissar of Dalian Naval Academy. In 2017, he rose to become director of the Political Department of South Sea Fleet. In September 2020, he was promoted again to become political commissar of the Northern Theater Command Navy.

He was promoted to the rank of rear admiral (Shaojiang) in May 2016 and vice admiral (zhongjiang) in September 2020.

Military offices
Preceded by Li Jianjun (李建军)	Political Commissar of Dalian Naval Academy; 2014–2017	Succeeded by Yu Wenbing (喻文兵)
Preceded by Kang Fei	Political Commissar of the Northern Theater Command Navy; 2020–present	Incumbent
