= Type 904 supply ship =

Chinese Navy supply ship

The Type 904 general stores issue ship and its successors Type 904A and Type 904B are second generation general stores issue ships currently in service with the People's Liberation Army Navy (PLAN). A total of five units have been built as of mid-2015, including two Type 904 ships, one Type 904A, and two Type 904B.

== Type 904 ==
Built by Qiuxin (求新) Shipyard of Jiangnan Shipyard in Shanghai, the Type 904 (and its successor Type 904A) are frequently but erroneously referred by many as underway replenishment ships. However, this is incorrect because these ships are designed as general stores issue ships, and they lack the gentries and transfer stations, and thus are not capable of performing any underway replenishment duties. Type 904 and Type 904A are equipped with four davits each housing a small boat, with two on each side, and these boats are the primary means to transfer supplies. Type 904 and Type 904A are intended to supply garrisons on offshore islands without any port facilities. A helicopter can be carried, but it has a landing platform only, without any hangars, and helicopter is the secondary mean of transferring supplies. Type 904 AKS has received NATO reporting name Dayun (大运, meaning Great Transportation) class. Specification:

- Full displacement (t): 10975
- Length (m): 156.2
- Width (m): 20.6
- Draft (m): 6.8
- Propulsion: 2 diesel engines @ 9000 hp
- Speed (kn): 22
- Crew: 240
- Armament: 4 twin 37 mmi guns and 4 twin 25 mm guns
- Endurance (nmi): 10000

== Type 904A ==
After two Type 904 were completed, production was transferred to an improved version designated as Type 904A that is more than 50% larger in terms of displacement (up to 15000 tons), but armament was reduced by half. This huge size difference is enough for Type 904A to receive a new NATO reporting name Danyao(弹药, meaning ammo, because when Type 904A was first put in use, the bulk of cargo it delivered was observed to be mostly ammunition). Type 904A has been temporarily loaned to China Fishery Law Enforcement Agency as its largest patrol ship. Specification: Specification (for Type 904):

- Full displacement (t): 15000
- Length (m): 171.1
- Width (m): 24.8
- Draft (m): 9
- Propulsion: 2 diesel engines @ 9000 hp
- Speed (kn): 22
- Crew: 240
- Aramament: 4 twin 37 mm guns
- Endurance (nmi): 10000

== Type 904B ==
Only a single Type 904A was built before production is switched to Type 904B, two of which are currently under construction. The biggest difference between Type 904B and its predecessor Type 904A is the addition of hangar onboard Type 904B, where Type 904A only had a landing platform. Other improvements include the replacement of older twin gun mounts by new H/PJ15 single 30 mm gun mounts and more advanced electronics such as radars. These differences are enough for Type 904B to receive a new NATO reporting name Danyao II class.

== Ships of Class ==
Type	Pennant #	Name	Chinese name	Builder	Launched	Commissioned	Decommissioned	Status	Fleet	Homeport	Notes
904	883	Dongtinghu	洞庭湖	Jiangnan Shipyard	Mar 1992			Active	South Sea Fleet		
904	Nanyun 952 (Pre August 2002) 884 (Post August 2002)	Yuncang (Pre August 2002) Jingpohu (Post August 2002)	云仓 (Pre August 2002) 镜泊湖 (Post August 2002)	Jiangnan Shipyard	May 1991	March 1993	July 15, 2019	Decommissioned	South Sea Fleet	Zhanjiang	Unit recipient of Meritorious Service medal 3rd class
904A	888	Fuxianhu	抚仙湖	―	2007			Active	South Sea Fleet		
904B	961	Junshanhu	军山湖	CSI	22 March 2015	June 2015		Active	South Sea Fleet		
904B	962	Luguhu	泸沽湖	CSI	10 July 2015	26 December 2015		Active	South Sea Fleet		
904B	965			CSI				Fitting Out			
