= Type 81 =

Type 81 may refer to:

- Type 81 (missile), a Japanese surface-to-air missile
- Type 81 assault rifle, a Chinese assault rifle
- Tribal-class frigate, designated as Type 81
- PHL-81, designation for the Type 81 rocket launcher
- Type 081 mine countermeasure ship
