= Wang Dengping =

Vice admiral of China's People's Liberation Army Navy (born 1952)

- 王登平

Deputy Political Commissar of the PLA Navy
- Incumbent
- Assumed office December 2014 Serving with Ding Haichun
- Political Commissar: Miao Hua
- Preceded by: Wang Sentai

Personal details
- Born: November 1952 (age 73) Feixi, Anhui, China
- Party: Chinese Communist Party
- Education: Tsinghua University; Central Party School

Military service
- Allegiance: China
- Branch/service: People's Liberation Army Navy
- Years of service: 1970−present
- Rank: Vice Admiral

Wang Dengping (Chinese: 王登平; born November 1952) is a vice admiral (zhong jiang) of China's People's Liberation Army Navy (PLAN). He has been a Deputy Political Commissar of the PLAN since December 2014, and formerly served as Political Commissar of the PLAN's North Sea Fleet and South Sea Fleet. He has been described as having hawkish views regarding China's territorial disputes.

== Biography ==
Wang Dengping was born in Feixi County in East China's Anhui Province. He studied radio electronics at Tsinghua University in the 1970s, and has a master's degree in political science from the Central Party School of the Chinese Communist Party.

Wang enlisted in the People's Liberation Army (PLA) in 1970, in the middle of the Cultural Revolution, and served as a platoon leader before becoming a political officer. He spent part of his career in Beijing in the PLA General Political Department's Propaganda Department, first as deputy director of an unidentified bureau, and then as director. For a time he served as the secretary of General Zhou Keyu. Afterwards, he joined the navy as deputy political commissar of the North Sea Fleet's Qingdao Support Base. He was promoted to the rank of rear admiral in July 2002.

In 2002, Wang embarked on a navy expedition that circumnavigated the globe. He worked closely with the commander of this expedition, Vice Admiral Ding Yiping. Wang later wrote an article describing the experience, entitled "The Chinese People's Navy's First Around-The-World Voyage."

In 2003, Wang was promoted to political commissar of the Qingdao Support Base. From 2006 to 2009, Wang served as political commissar of the Navy Equipment Department. In 2009, Wang became political commissar of the North Sea Fleet. He attained the rank of vice admiral in July 2011. In 2012, he was assigned to the South Sea Fleet, and Bai Wenqi succeeded him as political commissar of the North Sea Fleet. As a vice admiral, he was the highest ranking of the three fleet commissars. Wang was a deputy to the 11th National People's Congress (2008–2013).

Wang accompanied then Director of the PLA General Political Department, General Li Jinai, on two separate delegations: one to New Zealand and Chile in 2010, and one to North Korea in 2011. Additionally, he participated in a delegation to Sri Lanka and India in 2012, which was led by then Minister of Defense General Liang Guanglie.

In December 2014, Wang was appointed deputy political commissar of the PLA Navy.

== Views ==
A 2012 article in Global People, a tabloid published by the People's Daily, quotes Chinese military academics as saying that the appointment of VADM Jiang Weilie and VADM Wang to lead the South Sea Fleet indicated China's "firm resolve to safeguard its maritime rights and territorial integrity," and "can be viewed as a signal of more active Chinese responses to South China Sea issues." The article also quotes a PLA Academy of Military Science scholar as saying that both Jiang and Wang had expertise in the application of information technology to command and control, and that both possessed a "more hardline military position." Around the same time, the Hong Kong newspaper South China Morning Post described Wang as "famously hawkish."

In 2009, Wang told China News, "We do care about the South [China] Sea issue. We cannot let the territory shrink in our hands. We cannot lose the 3-million-square-kilometer territorial waters while protecting them." That same year, he told Hong Kong media, "From a military perspective, [China's] sovereignty over its maritime territories cannot be taken away – not even a single inch of it. We must defend it. We cannot lose it." He was also quoted on several instances after the 2009 incident with the U.S. Navy ship Impeccable, asserting China's right to regulate military activities in its exclusive economic zone.
