= Yang Zhiliang (military officer) =

Chinese general

- 杨志亮

Political Commissar of the South Sea Fleet
- Incumbent
- Assumed office December 2019
- Commander: Wang Hai
- Preceded by: Liu Mingli

Political Commissar of Equipment Department of the People's Liberation Army Navy
- In office 2018–2019

Political Commissar of the People's Liberation Army Naval Research Institute
- In office January 2018 – June 2018
- Succeeded by: Lai Ruxin

Political Commissar of the People's Liberation Army Navy Qingdao Support Base
- In office 2010–2011
- Preceded by: Zhou Zhiliang
- Succeeded by: Sun Chengjie

Personal details
- Born: November 1962 (age 63) Wuzhi County, Henan, China
- Party: Chinese Communist Party
- Spouse: Qiu Jirong
- Children: 1
- Parent(s): Yang Fucheng; Shen Fenglan
- Education: Dalian Naval Academy

Military service
- Allegiance: People's Republic of China
- Branch/service: People's Liberation Army Navy
- Years of service: 1981–present
- Rank: Vice Admiral
- Battles/wars: Johnson South Reef Skirmish

Chinese name
- Traditional Chinese: 楊志亮
- Simplified Chinese: 杨志亮
Transcriptions
Standard Mandarin
- Hanyu Pinyin: Yáng Zhìliáng

Yang Zhiliang (Chinese: 杨志亮; born November 1962) is a vice admiral (zhongjiang) of the People's Liberation Army Navy (PLAN). He has been Political Commissar of the South Sea Fleet since December 2019, and formerly served as Political Commissar of Equipment Department of the People's Liberation Army Navy. He attained the rank of rear admiral (shaojiang) in January 2017, and was promoted to the rank of vice admiral (zhongjiang) in December 2019.

== Biography ==
Yang was born into a family of farming background in the town of Xieqiying, in Wuzhi County, Henan in November 1962. He has a younger brother. He enlisted in the People's Liberation Army (PLA) in 1981. In 1983 he was accepted to Dalian Naval Academy. After graduating in March 1988, he took part in the Johnson South Reef Skirmish and won First Class Merit. In 2003 he was transferred to Shigatse, Tibet Autonomous Region. He was Political Commissar of the People's Liberation Army Navy Qingdao Support Base between 2010 and 2011. Then he was Deputy Political Commissar of the North Sea Fleet Air Force. He was Deputy Director of Political Department of the South Sea Fleet in 2015, and held that office until January 2018. He became Political Commissar of the People's Liberation Army Naval Research Institute in January 2018, but having held the position for only six months, and then he was appointed Political Commissar of Equipment Department of the People's Liberation Army Navy. In December 2019 he was promoted to become Political Commissar of the South Sea Fleet, replacing Liu Mingli.

== Personal life ==
His wife Qiu Jirong (邱积荣) is a doctor at a hospital in Dalian, Liaoning. Their son was born in 1988.

Military offices
Preceded by Zhou Zhiliang (周志亮)	Political Commissar of the People's Liberation Army Navy Qingdao Support Base; 2010–2011	Succeeded by Sun Chengjie (孙成杰)
Preceded by Liu Mingli	Political Commissar of the South Sea Fleet; 2019	Incumbent
Educational offices
Unknown	Political Commissar of the People's Liberation Army Naval Research Institute; 2018–2018	Succeeded by Lai Ruxin (赖如鑫)
