= Wang Huayong =

- 王华勇

Political Commissar of the East Sea Fleet
- Incumbent
- Assumed office July 2013
- Preceded by: Ding Haichun

Personal details
- Born: September 1955 (age 70) Honghu, Hubei, China
- Party: Chinese Communist Party

Military service
- Allegiance: China
- Branch/service: People's Liberation Army Navy
- Years of service: ?−present
- Rank: Vice Admiral

Wang Huayong (Chinese: 王华勇; born September 1955) is a vice admiral (zhong jiang) of China's People's Liberation Army Navy (PLAN). He has served as Political Commissar of the East Sea Fleet since July 2013.

== Biography ==
Wang Huayong was born in Honghu County, Hubei Province in September 1959.

By April 2001, he was serving as political commissar of a marine brigade, which has been referred to in the Chinese media as "Sky Eagle, Sea Dragon and Land Tiger". In late 2007, he was appointed political commissar of the Yulin Naval Base in the South Sea Fleet. In 2009, he was promoted to director of the South Sea Fleet Political Department.

In July 2013, Wang replaced Rear Admiral Ding Haichun as East Sea Fleet political commissar, and concurrently deputy political commissar of the Nanjing Military Region.

Wang is a representative of the 12th National People's Congress.
