= Wang Sentai =

Chinese politician

- 王森泰

Deputy Political Commissar of the PLA Navy
- In office January 2013 – December 2014 Serving with Wang Zhaohai, Ma Faxiang
- Political Commissar: Liu Xiaojiang
- Preceded by: Cen Xu
- Succeeded by: Wang Dengping

Personal details
- Born: December 1951 (age 74) Wuxing, Zhejiang, China
- Party: Chinese Communist Party
- Education: Central Party School of the Chinese Communist Party

Military service
- Allegiance: China
- Branch/service: People's Liberation Army Navy
- Years of service: ?−2014
- Rank: Lieutenant General

Wang Sentai (Chinese: 王森泰; born December 1951) is a retired lieutenant general (zhong jiang) of the People's Liberation Army of China. He served as a Deputy Political Commissar of the PLA Navy.

== Biography ==
Wang Sentai was born December 1951 in Wuxing, Zhejiang Province. He holds a graduate degree in international politics from the Central Party School of the Chinese Communist Party.

Wang served as political commissar for Bayi Studios, the PLA's film and television production company, from 1999 to 2004. In 2007, Wang was promoted to director of the Subordinate Organizations Work Department (直属机关工作部) under the PLA General Political Department (GPD), the department responsible for cultural goods produced directly for the GPD. Soon afterwards, Wang was selected to be a delegate to the 11th National People's Congress (NPC). During the third meeting of the NPC, Wang gave a speech on ideological work for senior and mid-level cadres.

In early 2010, Wang became deputy political commissar of the PLA Academy of Military Science. Shortly afterwards, he published articles in two national newspapers. On July 18 he published an article in the PLA Daily discussing the importance of political values to military innovation and research. Four days later, he published an article in the People's Daily on how best to popularize Marxism.

Wang attained the rank of major general in July 2001, and lieutenant general in December 2011.

In 2012, Wang was elected as a member to the Central Discipline Inspection Committee of the 18th National Congress of the Chinese Communist Party. In January 2013, he was appointed a deputy political commissar of the PLA Navy. He retired from active military service in December 2014.
