= Yang Zhiliang =

Yang Zhiliang, may refer to:

- Yang Chih-liang (born 1946), 13th Minister of the Department of Health of the Republic of China
- Yang Zhiliang (military officer) (born 1962), a vice admiral (zhongjiang) of the People's Liberation Army Navy (PLAN) of China
