= Dongtuo 835-class tug =

Ship class

Class overview
- Operators: People's Liberation Army Navy

General characteristics
- Type: Sea-going rescue tug (ATR)
- Propulsion: Marine Diesel
- Electronic warfare & decoys: None
- Armament: Small arms
- Armour: None
- Aircraft carried: None
- Aviation facilities: None

Dong-Tuo (拖, meaning North Tug) 835-class tug is a class of little known sea-going rescue tug (ATR) built in the People’s Republic of China (PRC) for the People's Liberation Army Navy (PLAN).

Dong-Tuo 835 rescue tug is developed from Nan-Tuo 181-class rescue tug half a decade ago, and thus inherits the same basic hull form and layout, but with various modifications, including a slightly modified hull form in the upper half portion of the bow with a different hawsehole for anchors, and replacing the original mainmast of Nan-Tuo 181-class tug with an enclosed mainmast of H-shape. The deck layout remains the same with that of Nan-Tuo 181-class tug in that superstructure consists of three levels of decks, with the first deck and second deck housing crew’s quarters, conference room, mess, galley, scullery, clinic, etc., while the third deck houses navigational, communication and command posts. In addition to machinery for towing operations, the tug is also equipped with firefighting equipment. By 2017, at least two unit of this class have been observed while fitting out, with Dong-Tuo 835 being the first ship of this class, while a second unit has been observed right next to Dong-Tuo 835, but without any pennant number or name assigned yet.

Type	NATO designation	Pennant No.	Name (English)	Name (Han 汉)	Commissioned	Displacement	Fleet	Status
Dong-Tuo 835-class rescue tug (ATR)	?	Dong-Tuo 835	East Tug 835	东拖 835	2017	? t	East Sea Fleet	Active
Dong-Tuo 835-class rescue tug (ATR)	?	?	?	?	After 2017	? t	?	Active
