= Sun Herong =

Chinese politician

- 孙和荣

Commander of the Eastern Theater Command Air Force
- Incumbent
- Assumed office February 2016
- Preceded by: New position

Commander of the Jinan Military Region Air Force
- In office December 2012 – January 2016
- Political commissar: Bai Wenqi
- Preceded by: Zheng Qunliang
- Succeeded by: Office abolished

Personal details
- Born: July 1957 (age 69) Guangrao, Shandong, China
- Party: Chinese Communist Party
- Education: Air Force Engineering University

Military service
- Allegiance: China
- Branch/service: People's Liberation Army Air Force
- Years of service: ? – present
- Rank: Lieutenant General

Sun Herong (Chinese: 孙和荣; born July 1957) is a lieutenant general of China's People's Liberation Army Air Force (PLAAF). He has been commander of the Eastern Theater Command Air Force and deputy commander of the Eastern Theater Command since February 2016. Prior to that, he served as commander of the Jinan Military Region Air Force and deputy commander of the Jinan MR from 2012 to 2016.

== Biography ==
Sun Herong was born in July 1957 in Guangrao, Shandong Province. He graduated from the PLA Air Force Engineering University.

Sun was deputy chief of staff of Shenyang Military Region Air Force (2003–2006) and commander of the Dalian Forward Headquarters (2007). In June 2007 he was transferred to the Nanjing Military Region Air Force as deputy chief of staff. He became chief of staff of the Jinan Military Region Air Force in May 2009, and deputy commander in August 2011. In December 2012, he was promoted to commander of the Jinan Military Region Air Force and deputy commander of the Jinan MR. In February 2016, during Central Military Commission chairman Xi Jinping's military reform, Sun was appointed commander of the Eastern Theater Command Air Force and deputy commander of the newly established Eastern Theater Command.

Sun attained the rank of major general in July 2005, and lieutenant general (zhong jiang) in July 2014. He is a member of the 12th National People's Congress.

== Book ==
In 2003, Sun Herong and Yi Xiaoguang co-authored the highly acclaimed book The Stealth Aircraft: A Difficult Adversary (隐形飞机及其克星). The work proved popular with the PLAAF, then in the midst of examining high-tech warfare.
