= Wang Dazhong (military officer) =

Chinese naval admiral (born 1962)

- 王大忠
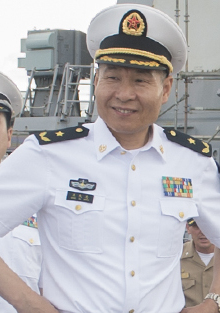
- Wang in 2017

Commander of the Northern Theater Command Navy
- Incumbent
- Assumed office December 2021
- Political Commissar: Fu Yaoquan
- Preceded by: Hu Zhongming

Personal details
- Born: Si County, Anhui, China; February 1962 (age 64)
- Party: Chinese Communist Party
- Education: People's Liberation Army National Defense University; Guangzhou Naval Academy
- Awards: Third-class meritorious service medal, outstanding Communist Party member of Navy

Military service
- Allegiance: People's Republic of China
- Branch/service: People's Liberation Army Navy
- Years of service: 1980–present
- Rank: Vice Admiral

Wang Dazhong (Chinese: 王大忠; born February 1962) is an vice admiral of the People's Liberation Army (PLA). Currently he serves as commander of the North Sea Fleet since the end of 2021. He previously served as deputy director of the Logistics Support Department of the Military Commission from June 2018 to December 2021.

== Biography ==
Wang was born in Si County, Suzhou, Anhui in February 1962. Wang was a student of the National Defense University. In September 1987, he served as the squadron leader of the 6th Regiment of the 2nd Division of the Naval Aviation Corps, he enrolled in the surface submarine command major of the Guangzhou Naval Academy. After graduating from the Guangzhou Naval Academy, he served as the trainee and deputy captain of the Jinan and Harbin missile destroyer before serving as the captain of the Qingdao missile destroyer.

Wang was the commander of the Chinese Navy's maritime formation in the "Maritime Alliance-2013", a joint maritime exercise between the Chinese and Russian navy in July 2013. In 2015 he became assistant chief of staff of the Navy before becoming deputy chief of staff of the People's Liberation Army Navy. On May 6 Wang was promoted with 11 other officers from the rank of colonel to the rank of rear admiral.

In June 2018, he was transferred to the position of deputy director of the Logistics Support Department of the Central Military Commission. In December 2021, it was confirmed that Wang Dazhong was transferred to the post of commander of the North Sea Fleet as well as his promotion to the rank of vice admiral.

== Awards ==
Wang Dazhong was awarded multiple times third-class meritorious service as well as being named an outstanding Communist Party member of the Navy in 2001. It is also noted that including Wang Dazhong eight others: Li Xiaoyan, Bai Yaoping, Yang Hong, Wang Zhongcai, Wang Yucheng, Ma Yelong, He Hu, Peng Jianlin became the first "Pilot Captain Class" students after a strict assessment. As they were able to fly aircraft in the sky and lead warships into the sea.

Military offices
Preceded by Hu Zhongming	Commander of the Northern Theater Command Navy; 2021–present	Incumbent
