= Fan Yinhua =

- 范印华

Deputy Political Commissar of the People's Liberation Army Navy
- In office July 2008 – August 2011
- Political Commissar: Liu Xiaojiang

Personal details
- Born: 1948 (age 77–78) Xian County, Hebei, China
- Party: Chinese Communist Party
- Education: Central Party School of the Chinese Communist Party

Military service
- Allegiance: People's Republic of China
- Branch/service: People's Liberation Army Ground Force (1970–2005); People's Liberation Army Navy (2005–2011)
- Years of service: 1970–2011
- Rank: Vice Admiral

Chinese name
- Simplified Chinese: 范印华
- Traditional Chinese: 范印華
Transcriptions
Standard Mandarin
- Hanyu Pinyin: Fàn Yìnhuá

Fan Yinhua (Chinese: 范印华; born 1948) is a vice admiral in the People's Liberation Army of China. He was a delegate to the 10th National People's Congress and a member of the 17th CCP Central Commission for Discipline Inspection. He was a member of the 13th National Committee of the Chinese People's Political Consultative Conference.

== Biography ==
Fan was born in Xian County, Hebei, in 1948. He enlisted in the People's Liberation Army (PLA) in December 1970, and joined the Chinese Communist Party (CCP) in October 1973. He served in the Beijing Military Region since December 1970, and was eventually promoted to director of Political Department of the Beijing Garrison in April 1996. He attained the rank of major general (shaojiang) in July 1998. In July 1998, he became deputy head of Organization Division of the People's Liberation Army General Political Department, and was appointed president of the PLA Newspaper Agency in November 2001. He was recalled to the People's Liberation Army General Political Department as secretary-general in January 2003.

He was appointed director of Political Department of the People's Liberation Army Navy (PLAN) in December 2005, and was admitted to member of the Standing Committee of the CCP PLAN Committee, the navy's top authority. In July 2008, he was promoted to become deputy political commissar of the PLAN and secretary of Discipline Inspection Commission, a position he held until August 2011.

He was promoted to the rank of rear admiral (shaojiang) in December 2005 and vice admiral (zhongjiang) in July 2007.
