= Liu Juying =

Chinese politician (1917–2015)

- 刘居英

6th Director of Political Department of the People's Liberation Army Navy
- In office May 1972 – August 1975
- Preceded by: Zhang Jingyi
- Succeeded by: Wang Xin

2nd President of PLA Military Engineering Institute
- In office March 1961 – August 1966
- Preceded by: Chen Geng
- Succeeded by: Lin Yi

1st Mayor of Changchun
- In office November 1945 – April 1946
- Preceded by: New title
- Succeeded by: Zhang Wenhai

Personal details
- Born: Liu Zhicheng (刘志诚); March 31, 1917 Changchun, Jilin, China
- Died: December 6, 2015 (aged 98) 301 Hospital, Beijing, China
- Party: Chinese Communist Party
- Spouse: Xu Liangyu
- Education: Peking University; Central Party School of the Chinese Communist Party

Military service
- Allegiance: People's Republic of China
- Branch/service: People's Liberation Army Ground Force (1936-71); People's Liberation Army Navy (1971-87)
- Years of service: 1936-1987
- Rank: Major general
- Battles/wars: Second Sino-Japanese War; Chinese Civil War; Korean War
- Awards: Order of Liberation (First Class Medal; 1955); Order of Independence and Freedom (Second Class Medal; 1963); Order of the Red Star (First Class Medal; 1988); Flag Medal (North Korean); Order of Freedom and Independence (First Class Medal; North Korean)

Liu Juying (simplified Chinese: 刘居英; traditional Chinese: 劉居英; pinyin: Liú Jūyīng; 31 March 1917 – 6 December 2015) was a Chinese politician, revolutionary, and general in the People's Liberation Army.

== Biography ==
Liu was born Liu Zhicheng in Changchun, Jilin, in 1917. He joined the Communist Youth League of China in April 1933. In August 1935 he was accepted to the Chemistry Department of Peking University, where he served as Party Branch Secretary of Peking University of the Communist Youth League, and he participated in the December 9th Movement during school days. In February 1936 he joined the Chinese Communist Party (CCP).

=== Second Sino-Japanese War ===
During the Second Sino-Japanese War, he worked in Shandong, he organized a Counter-Japanese troop led by CCP, and served as CCP Committee Secretary of Laiwu County. In 1940 he served as head of Shandong Provincial Public Security Department, and was elected a selectmen. In 1943, he was Secretary-General of Shandong Provincial Government and head of Shandong Provincial Public Security Bureau.

=== Chinese Civil War ===
In November 1945, he was appointed mayor of Changchun, capital of northeast China's Jilin province. One month later, he served as political commissar of Jilin-Heilongjiang Division of the Northeast Democratic United Army. In February 1946 he was promoted to become Secretary-General of Jilin Provincial Government, and concurrently served as head of Harbin Railroad Bureau in December. In December 1948 he was appointed a member of the CCP Shenyang Military Control Committee. He was head of Shenyang Railroad Bureau and first deputy director of North Eastern Railway Administration in February 1949.

=== After the establishment of PRC ===
After the founding of the Communist State, he successively served as head of Changchun Railroad Bureau, commander of Transportation Command of Northeast China Military Region, assistant commander Sino - DPRK Joint Railway Transportation Command. During the Korean War, he took charge of guaranteeing the logistics and transportation. After war, the North Korean government awarded him the First Class Medal of Order of Freedom and Independence and a Flag Medal. He was awarded the rank of Major general in 1955.

In February 1954, Mao Zedong appointed him as vice-president of PLA Military Engineering Institute, working as an assistant to President Chen Geng. In March 1961, he took over the president of the university after Chen Geng died. In March 1966, PLA Military Engineering Institute was renamed Harbin Engineering Institute, Liu served as president and CCP Committee Secretary. In August he was dismissed from his posts while Mao Zedong launched the Cultural Revolution, he was brought to be persecuted and then was sent to the May Seventh Cadre Schools to perform manual labour. Liu's father was terrified of the Cultural Revolution and died of cerebral hemorrhage, and his mother hung herself because she could not endure the humiliation.

At the beginning of 1971, Liu was rehabilitated. In March 1971, he was assigned to the People's Liberation Army Navy. He served as director of its Political Department in the following year. In 1977, he entered the Central Party School of the Chinese Communist Party. In May 1978, he was appointed assistant commander of the PLA railway engineering corps, he organized his forces to build Qinghai-Tibet Railway, Nanjiang Railway, Tonghuo Railway, and Yanzhou-Shijiazhuang Railway. In 1982, he became commander-in-chief of Luanhe-Tianjin Water Diversion Project, a position he held until January 1987, when he retired.

He was a delegate to the 3rd National People's Congress and a delegate to the 8th National Congress of the Chinese Communist Party.

Liu died at 301 Military Hospital, in Beijing, on December 6, 2015, aged 98.

== Personal life ==
Liu was married to Xu Liangyu (许良毓).

Government offices
New title	1st Mayor of Changchun; 1945–1946	Succeeded by Zhang Wenhai (张文海)
Educational offices
Preceded by Chen Geng	2nd President of PLA Military Engineering Institute; 1961–1966	Succeeded by Lin Yi (林毅)
Military offices
Preceded by Zhang Jingyi (张敬一)	6th Director of Political Department of the People's Liberation Army Navy; 1972–1975	Succeeded by Wang Xin (王昕)
