= Yang Shiguang =

Chinese general

- 杨世光

Director of the PLA Navy Political Department
- In office December 2014 – December 2015
- Preceded by: Ding Haichun
- Succeeded by: Position abolished

Director of Political Department of the East Sea Fleet
- In office 2012–2014
- Preceded by: Liu Mingli
- Succeeded by: Wen Xinchao

Personal details
- Born: 1956 (age 69–70) China
- Party: Chinese Communist Party

Military service
- Allegiance: People's Republic of China
- Branch/service: People's Liberation Army Navy
- Rank: Vice Admiral
- Unit: East Sea Fleet (2012–2014)

Yang Shiguang (simplified Chinese: 杨世光; traditional Chinese: 楊世光; pinyin: Yáng Shìguāng; born 1956) is a vice admiral (zhongjiang) of the People's Liberation Army Navy (PLAN) of China. He was director of the PLA Navy Political Department between December 2014 and December 2015.

== Biography ==
Yang was the political commissar of the Naval Aeronautical Engineering Institute in June 2009, and held that office until March 2012. Then he was commissioned as director of the Political Department of the East Sea Fleet, he remained in that position until December 2014, when he was elevated to director of the PLA Navy Political Department. Yang attained the rank of rear admiral (shaojiang) in July 2010, and was promoted to the rank of vice admiral (zhongjiang) in July 2016.

Military offices
Preceded by Liu Mingli	Director of the Political Department of the East Sea Fleet; 2012–2014	Succeeded by Wen Xinchao (温新超)
Preceded by Ding Haichun	Director of the Political Department of the PLA Navy; 2014–2015	Succeeded by Position abolished
