= Ma Faxiang =

Chinese military personnel (1953–2014)

- 马发祥

Deputy Political Commissar of the PLA Navy
- In office July 2013 – November 2014 Serving with Wang Sentai
- Political Commissar: Liu Xiaojiang
- Preceded by: Wang Zhaohai
- Succeeded by: Ding Haichun

Personal details
- Born: 1953 Dali County, Shaanxi, China
- Died: 13 November 2014 (aged 61) Beijing
- Party: Chinese Communist Party

Military service
- Allegiance: China
- Branch/service: People's Liberation Army Navy
- Years of service: ?−2014
- Rank: Vice Admiral

Ma Faxiang (Chinese: 马发祥; 1953 – 13 November 2014) was a Chinese vice admiral (zhong jiang) who served as Deputy Political Commissar of the People's Liberation Army Navy (PLAN). He came under investigation for corruption and died by suicide in November 2014.

== Life and career ==
Ma Faxiang was born in 1953 in Dali County, Shaanxi Province.

Ma was appointed Political Commissar of the PLAN Armament Research Institute in July 2004, and attained the rank of rear admiral a year later. In July 2008, he was appointed Political Commissar of the Navy test and training base. He was elevated to Director of the Political Department of the Navy in June 2011, and attained the rank of vice admiral in 2012. In a 2013 report published by the American think tank the Jamestown Foundation, analysts considered Ma the top contender to succeed Admiral Liu Xiaojiang as the PLAN's next political commissar. In July 2013, he was promoted to Deputy Political Commissar of the PLAN.

== Suicide ==
On 13 November 2014, Ma Faxiang jumped to his death from a building at the navy complex in Gongzhufen, Beijing. Ma had come under investigation for corruption by the Central Discipline Inspection Commission, and it is believed that he died by suicide to avoid disgrace and allow his family to receive his retirement benefits, although it was also said that he had suffered from depression. His suicide followed that of Rear Admiral Jiang Zhonghua under similar circumstances about two months before. Ma's corruption investigation is thought to be connected to the cases of the former vice chairmen of the Central Military Commission, Xu Caihou and Guo Boxiong.

People's Navy, the official newspaper of the PLAN, announced that Ma Faxiang had died of an illness. The official obituary called him "an excellent Communist Party member and an excellent political commander of the Navy". On 1 December 2014, his body was cremated at the Babaoshan Revolutionary Cemetery. Many current and former navy leaders, including Commander Wu Shengli and Political Commissar Liu Xiaojiang, attended the farewell ceremony, but top Communist Party and government leaders were notably absent.

Military offices
Previous: Wang Zhaohai	Director of the Political Department of the PLA Navy; 2009–2011	Next: Ding Haichun
