= Miao Hua =

Chinese military officer

Admiral Miao Hua
- 苗华

Director of the Political Work Department of the Central Military Commission
- In office October 2017 – 27 June 2025 (Note: Suspended since 28 November 2024)
- CMC Chairman: Xi Jinping

Political Commissar of the People's Liberation Army Navy
- In office December 2014 – September 2017
- Deputy: Ding Haichun, Wang Dengping
- Commander: Shen Jinlong
- Preceded by: Liu Xiaojiang
- Succeeded by: Qin Shengxiang

Political Commissar of the Lanzhou Military Region
- In office July 2014 – December 2014
- Preceded by: Li Changcai
- Succeeded by: Liu Lei

Personal details
- Born: November 1955 (age 70) Fuzhou, Fujian, China
- Party: Chinese Communist Party (1973−2025; expelled)

Military service
- Allegiance: People's Republic of China
- Branch/service: People's Liberation Army Ground Force; People's Liberation Army Navy
- Years of service: 1969−2025
- Rank: Admiral (stripped 2025)
- Commands: Political Work Department of the Central Military Commission

Chinese name
- Traditional Chinese: 苗華
- Simplified Chinese: 苗华
Transcriptions
Standard Mandarin
- Hanyu Pinyin: Miáo Huá
Eastern Min
- Fuzhou BUC: Mièu Huà

Miao Hua (Chinese: 苗华; born November 1955) is a former admiral of the Chinese People's Liberation Army Navy (PLAN). He served as the director of the Political Work Department of the Central Military Commission from October 2017 to June 2025. Previously, he served as political commissar of the PLA Navy from December 2014 to September 2017, and political commissar of the Lanzhou Military Region in 2014.

Miao had also served as a member of the 18th Central Commission for Discipline Inspection, the 19th Central Committee of the Chinese Communist Party and the 20th Central Committee of the Chinese Communist Party. He was considered to have been a part of the Fujian clique of the Xi Jinping faction in the CCP.

== Biography ==
Miao Hua was born in November 1955 in Fuzhou, Fujian Province. He is of Rugao, Jiangsu ancestry.

He enlisted in the PLA in December 1969, serving as a soldier in the 274th regiment of the 92nd division of the 31st Group Army, in the Nanjing Military Region. He joined the Chinese Communist Party in September 1973. In the 1980s, he served as a political commissar in several regiments. In the 1990s, he rose to director of the Political Department of the 93rd division, and then political commissar of the 91st division. In August 1999, Miao became director of the Political Department of the 31st Group Army, and attained the rank of major general in July 2001. He was made Political Commissar of the 12th Group Army in July 2005.

Miao was appointed director of the Political Department of the Lanzhou Military Region in December 2010. In July 2012, he became deputy political commissar of the Lanzhou MR, and attained the rank of lieutenant general. In July 2014, he was promoted to political commissar of the Lanzhou MR, replacing General Li Changcai, who had retired.

Five months later, Miao was transferred from the army to the People's Liberation Army Navy, and appointed political commissar of the navy. It was a highly unusual move, as navy political commissars, including his predecessor Liu Xiaojiang, were normally promoted internally. Observers have interpreted the move as related to the fall of General Xu Caihou, the former vice chairman of the Central Military Commission. Miao spent most of his career in the Nanjing Military Region, and was based in Xiamen, Fujian Province around the same time when Xi Jinping served as deputy party secretary of Fujian. He worked for many years alongside Xi, who later became CCP general secretary, the top leader in 2012.

On 31 July 2015, Miao Hua was promoted to admiral, the highest rank for Chinese military officers in active service, together with nine other officers.

== Suspension ==
On 28 November 2024, the Ministry of National Defense announced the suspension of Miao, while he was being investigated for "serious violations of discipline." On 30 April 2025, the Standing Committee of the 14th National People's Congress announced that Miao was dismissed from the NPC. In late May, a party official stated that Miao was suspected of "legal violations". The Political Work Department of the Central Military Commission held a military representative conference on 14 March 2025 and decided to remove him as a representative in the 14th National People's Congress. On 27 June, the Standing Committee of the 14th National People's Congress voted to remove Miao from the Central Military Commission. On October 17, 2025, the Ministry of National Defense announced that Miao was expelled from the CCP and the PLA for "serious violations of discipline and law".

== See also ==
- Officials implicated by the anti-corruption campaign in China (2022–)
