= Yuchi Naval Base =

Naval base in China

Coordinates: 35°43′25″N 119°59′48″E

Yuchi Naval Base Navy Comprehensive Support Base Qingdao
- Yuchi Bay, Qingdao, Shandong, China

Site information
- Type: Naval base
- Controlled by: PLA Navy
- Condition: In Use

Site history
- Built: 1950
- In use: 1950 - Present

Garrison information
- Garrison: North Sea Fleet

Yuchi Naval Base, formally known as Navy Comprehensive Support Base Qingdao (Chinese: 海军青岛综合保障基地) is a naval base used by the People’s Liberation Army Navy (PLAN). According to a number of media reports and open source satellite observation (Google Earth) it is the home base of the first PLAN aircraft carrier Liaoning; along with a number of escort and support vessels.

The base is protected by several breakwaters and has deep draught access. There are four mooring piers of over 1000 metres in length and fifth measuring approximately 820 metres in length. The harbour area is divided into two main areas with the carrier battle group occupying the eastern part of the harbour.

== History ==
The Naval Base was founded on September 9, 1950.

== Location ==
The base is located within the West Coast New Area south of the major urban area of Qingdao on the Yellow Sea, in Shandong Province. Open source satellite imagery (Google Earth) confirmed the base is extensive and underwent considerable expansion beginning in early 2012. The base is subordinate to the PLAN's North Sea Fleet.

== Strategic importance ==
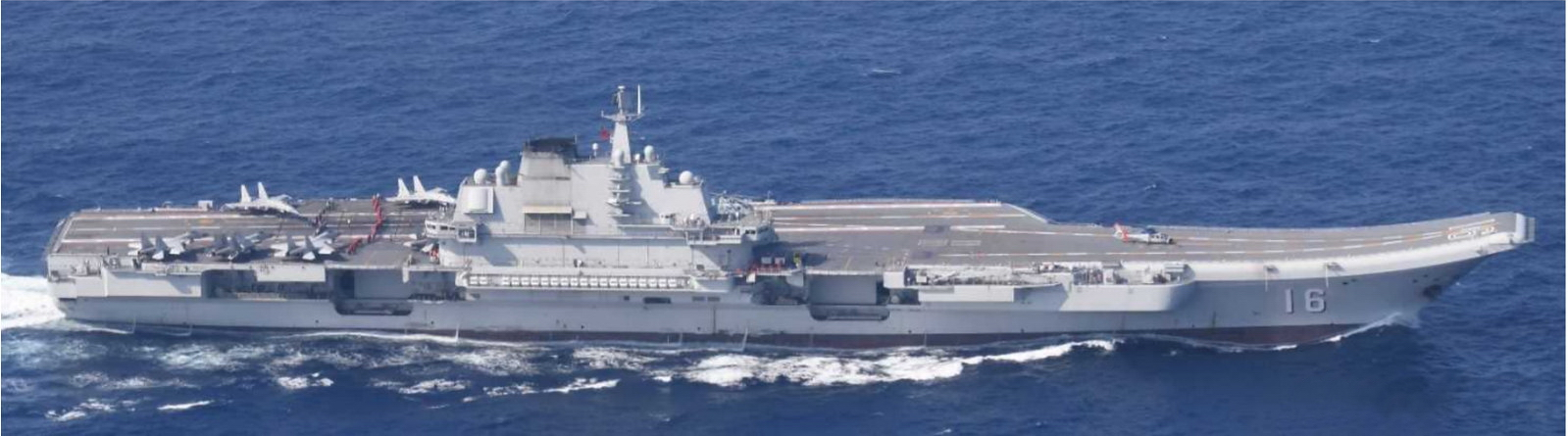
The Aircraft Carrier Liaoning

This base is one of the biggest bases operated by the PLAN and is home to one of its two operational aircraft carrier battle groups.

As the PLAN continues to develop its at sea capabilities the carrier battle group bases will be of strategic importance for China as a capability to project maritime power beyond the Yellow Sea.
