= Type 081 mine countermeasure vessel =

Chinese naval ship

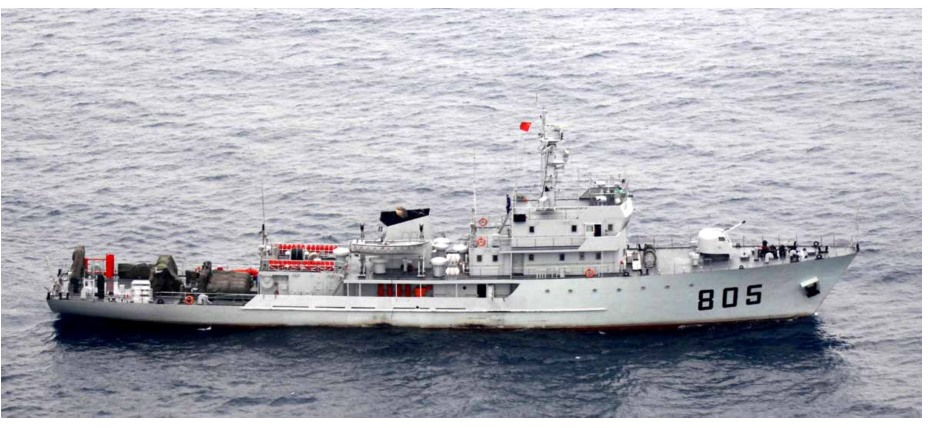
Type 081

Type 081 mine countermeasure vessel (NATO reporting name Wochi-class) is a Chinese minesweeper/minehunter currently in service with the People's Liberation Army Navy (PLAN). The second batch is often designated as Type 081A.

== Type 081 ==
Type 081 was built by Qiuxin (求新) Shipyard of Jiangnan Shipyard in Shanghai. The first ship was launched in 2006 and entered service in 2007. Specification:

- Displacement: 996 tons
- Length: 65 m (213 ft)
- Armament: 1 Type 76 twin 37 mm naval gun (Type 76F)

| Type | Pennant # | Name | Builder | Launched | Commissioned | Status | Fleet |
|---|---|---|---|---|---|---|---|
| 081 | 805 | 张家港 / Zhangjiagang | Qiuxin | 2006 | 6 Mar 2007 | Active | East Sea Fleet |
| 081 | 810 | 靖江 / Jingjiang | Qiuxin | ― | 9 Nov 2007 | Active | East Sea Fleet |
| 081 | 839 | 浏阳 / Liuyang | Qiuxin | 12 Nov 2006 | 29 July 2007 | Active | South Sea Fleet |
| 081 | 840 | 泸溪 / Luxi | Qiuxin | 15 May 2006 | 29 July 2007 | Active | South Sea Fleet |

== Type 081A ==
Originally only known as the second batch of Type 081, it was revealed that this new minesweeper was designated as Type 081A, and it is a development of earlier Type 081. Type 081A is designed by the 708th Institute. A total of five have entered service with PLAN by mid-2014. Specification:

- Displacement: 1200 tons
- Length: 67.8 m (222 ft)
- Armament: 1 H/PJ-14 single 30 mm naval gun

| Type | Pennant # | Name | Builder | Launched | Commissioned | Status | Fleet |
|---|---|---|---|---|---|---|---|
| 081A | 841 | 孝义 / Xiaoyi | JNCX | Oct 2010 | Feb 24, 2012 | Active | South Sea Fleet |
| 081A | 842 | 台山 / Taishan | JNCX | ― | Aug 6, 2012 | Active | South Sea Fleet |
| 081A | 843 | 常熟 / Changshu | Wuchang | May 2012 | May 13, 2013 | Active | South Sea Fleet |
| 081A | 844 | 鹤山 / Heshan | JNCX | Sept 2012 | Oct 10, 2013 | Active | South Sea Fleet |
| 081A | 845 | 青州 / Qingzhou | JNCX | ― | Jan 26, 2014 | Active | North Sea Fleet |
| 081A | 846 | 禹城 / Yucheng | JNCX | Sept 2013 | 10 Oct 2014 | Active | North Sea Fleet |
| 081A | 847 | 仁怀 / Renhuai | Wuchang | ― | 2018 | Active | North Sea Fleet |
| 081A | 848 | 宣威 / Xuanwei | Wuchang | Aug 2017 | 2018 | Active | North Sea Fleet |
| 081A | 849 | 无棣 / Wudi | Wuchang | 10 Dec 2017 | 2019 | Active | North Sea Fleet |
| 081A | 831 | 江山 / Jiangshan | Wuchang | 28 Mar 2018 | 2019 | Active | East Sea Fleet |
