= Yuan Huazhi =

Chinese general

- 袁华智
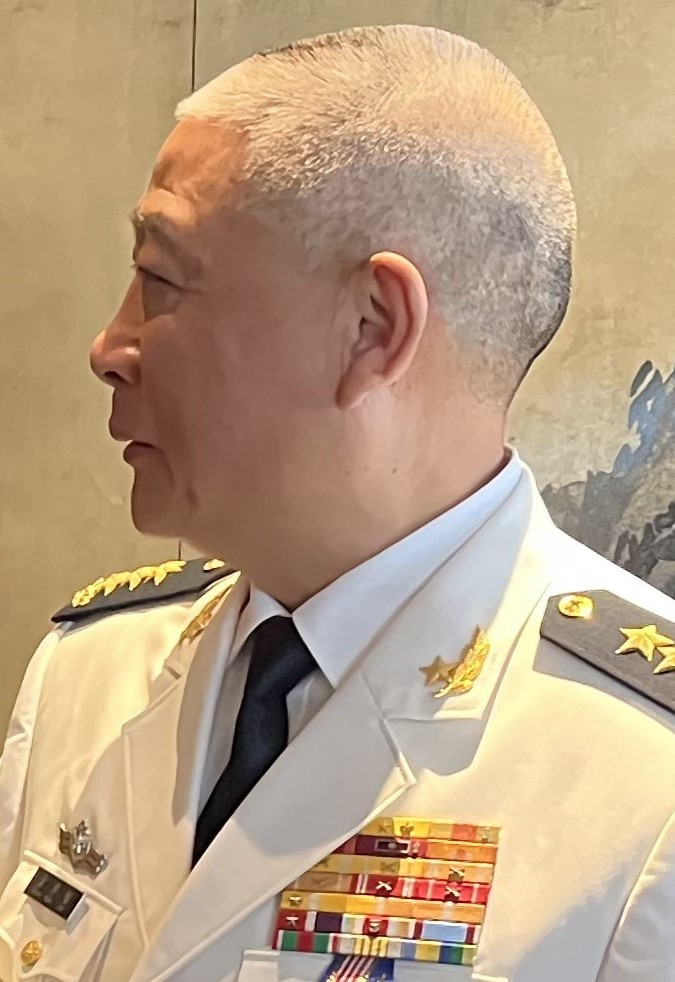
- Yuan in 2024

Political Commissar of the People's Liberation Army Navy
- In office January 2022 – October 2025
- Preceded by: Qin Shengxiang
- Succeeded by: TBA

Political Commissar of the Eastern Theater Command Air Force
- In office December 2018 – March 2019
- Preceded by: Liu Dewei
- Succeeded by: Zhong Weiguo

Political Commissar of the People's Liberation Army Navy Marine Corps
- In office March 2017 – December 2018
- Preceded by: New title
- Succeeded by: Wang Hongbin

Political Commissar of the People's Liberation Army Naval Research Institute
- In office December 2015 – March 2017
- Preceded by: Li Daoming
- Succeeded by: Position abolished

Personal details
- Born: October 1961 (age 64) Xiantao, Hubei, China
- Party: Chinese Communist Party (expelled in 2025)

Military service
- Allegiance: Chinese Communist Party
- Branch/service: People's Liberation Army Navy
- Years of service: 1978–2025
- Rank: Admiral (stripped 2025)

Chinese name
- Traditional Chinese: 袁華智
- Simplified Chinese: 袁华智
Transcriptions
Standard Mandarin
- Hanyu Pinyin: Yuán Huázhì

Yuan Huazhi (Chinese: 袁华智; born October 1961) is a former admiral (shangjiang) of the People's Liberation Army Navy (PLAN). He has been Political Commissar of the People's Liberation Army Navy since January 2022. He attained the rank of rear admiral (shaojiang) in July 2015, and was promoted to the rank of vice admiral (zhongjiang) in December 2019 and admiral (shangjiang) in January 2022.

== Biography ==
Yuan was born in Xiantao, Hubei in October 1961. He enlisted in the People's Liberation Army (PLA) in 1978. He served in the People's Liberation Army Navy (PLAN) for a long time. In December 2015 he became Political Commissar of the People's Liberation Army Naval Research Institute, replacing Li Daoming. He was Political Commissar of the People's Liberation Army Navy Marine Corps in March 2017, and held that office until December 2018, when he was transferred to the People's Liberation Army Air Force and appointed Political Commissar of the Eastern Theater Command Air Force. In March 2019 he was promoted to become Deputy Political Commissar of the People's Liberation Army Navy. In January 2022, he was promoted again to become Political Commissar of the People's Liberation Army Navy. On October 17, 2025, the Ministry of National Defense announced that He was expelled from the CCP and the PLA for "serious violations of discipline and law".

Educational offices
Preceded by Li Daoming (李道明)	Political Commissar of the People's Liberation Army Naval Research Institute; 2015–2017	Succeeded by Position abolished
Military offices
New title	Political Commissar of the People's Liberation Army Navy Marine Corps; 2017–2018	Succeeded by Wang Hongbin
Preceded by Liu Dewei	Political Commissar of the Eastern Theater Command Air Force; 2018–2019	Succeeded by Zhong Weiguo (钟卫国)
Preceded by Qin Shengxiang	Political Commissar of the People's Liberation Army Navy; 2022–2025	Succeeded by Vacant
