= Kang Fei =

- 康非

Political Commissar of the North Sea Fleet
- In office July 2015 – September 2020
- Preceded by: Bai Wenqi
- Succeeded by: Fu Yaoquan

Political Commissar of the Logistics Department of People's Liberation Army Navy
- In office April 2012 – March 2015
- Preceded by: Ding Haichun
- Succeeded by: Cao Xinyuan

Personal details
- Born: August 1957 (age 68) Haidian District, Beijing, China
- Party: Chinese Communist Party

Military service
- Allegiance: People's Republic of China
- Branch/service: People's Liberation Army Navy
- Rank: Vice Admiral

Kang Fei (Chinese: 康非; pinyin: Kāng Fēi; born August 1957) is a vice admiral (zhong jiang) of the Chinese People's Liberation Army Navy (PLAN). He has been deputy political commissar of Northern Theater Command and political commissar of the East Sea Fleet (Northern Theater Command Navy) between 2015 and 2020.

== Biography ==
Kang Fei was born in Haidian District of Beijing in August 1957. He was political commissar of the Third Detachment of the East Sea Fleet before serving as political commissar of PLAN Dalian Naval Academy in 2008. In April 2012, he was commissioned as political commissar of Logistics Department of the People's Liberation Army Navy, and held that office until March 2015, when he was appointed deputy director of Political Department of the People's Liberation Army Navy. In July 2015, he became deputy political commissar of Jinan Military Region and political commissar of North Sea Fleet. When the North Sea Fleet was reorganized as the Northern Theater Command Navy in February 2016, he became political commissar of the Northern Theater Command Navy and deputy political commissar of the Northern Theater Command.

Kang Fei attained the rank of rear admiral in July 2010, and vice admiral in July 2016.

Military offices
Preceded by Ding Haichun	Political Commissar of the Logistics Department of People's Liberation Army Navy; 2010–2015	Succeeded by Cao Xinyuan
Preceded by Bai Wenqi	Political Commissar of the North Sea Fleet; 2015–2020	Succeeded by Fu Yaoquan
