= Ding Haichun =

Chinese politician

- 丁海春

Deputy Political Commissar of the PLA Navy
- Incumbent
- Assumed office December 2014 Serving with Wang Dengping
- Political Commissar: Miao Hua
- Preceded by: Ma Faxiang

Political Commissar of the East Sea Fleet
- In office December 2011 – July 2013
- Preceded by: Cen Xu
- Succeeded by: Wang Huayong

Personal details
- Born: April 1954 (age 71–72) Yiyang, Hunan, China
- Party: Chinese Communist Party

Military service
- Allegiance: China
- Branch/service: People's Liberation Army Navy
- Years of service: ?−present
- Rank: Vice Admiral

Ding Haichun (Chinese: 丁海春; born April 1954) is a vice admiral (zhong jiang) of China's People's Liberation Army Navy (PLAN). He has been a Deputy Political Commissar of the PLAN since December 2014.

== Biography ==
Ding Haichun was born in Yiyang, in Central China's Hunan Province.

In late 2006, Ding became the director of the Political Department the PLA Naval Command Academy. In late 2007, he was appointed political commissar of the North Sea Fleet's Lushun Support Base. In late 2009, he became political commissar of the PLA Navy Logistics Department. After roughly two years in this position, Ding moved to the East Sea Fleet as its political commissar.

In 2007, Ding wrote an article in Political Work Study Journal about a navy conference focusing on cadre development, possibly indicating expertise in personnel management. In 2013, he was elected a member of the 12th National People's Congress.

In July 2013, Ding was appointed Director of the PLA Navy's Political Department, and promoted to the rank of vice admiral. He was replaced as East Sea Fleet political commissar by Rear Admiral Wang Huayong, who also served concurrently as Nanjing MR deputy political commissar.

In December 2014, Ding became a deputy political commissar of the PLA Navy, replacing Vice Admiral Ma Faxiang, who had committed suicide.

Military offices
Previous: Xu Lili	Political Commissar of the Logistics Department of the PLA Navy; 2009-2011	Next: Kang Fei
Previous: Ma Faxiang	Director of the Political Department of the PLA Navy; 2013-2014	Next: Yang Shiguang
