= Junshan Lake =

- Location within China
- Coordinates: 28°34′N 116°19′E
- Lake type: Fresh water lake
- Catchment area: 615 km^{2} (237 sq mi)
- Basin countries: China
- Max. length: 25 km (16 mi)
- Max. width: 18.2 km (11 mi)
- Surface area: 192.5 km^{2} (100 sq mi)
- Average depth: 4 m (13 ft)
- Max. depth: 6.4 m (21 ft)
- Water volume: 766×10^{6} m^{3} (27.1×10^{9} cu ft)
- Surface elevation: 18 m (59 ft)

Junshan Lake (Chinese: 军山湖; pinyin: Jūnshān Hú), also known as "Sun Moon Lake" (Chinese: 日月湖; pinyin: Rìyuè Hú) during ancient times, is a freshwater lake in China. It is located in Jinxian County of Jiangxi Province, situated to the south of Poyang Lake. The drainage basin has an area of 615 km^{2} (237 sq mi), with an elevation of 18 m (59 ft), a length of 25 km (16 mi) and a greatest breadth from east to west of 18.2 km (11.3 mi) (the average breadth is only 7.7 km; 4.8 mi). The lake has a surface area of 192.5 km (119.61 mi), and volume is about 7.66×10^{8} m^{3} (2.71×10^{10} cu ft). The maximum depth of the Junshan Lake is 6.4 m (21 ft), though the average is 4 m (13 ft). The lake is rich in fish and crab.
