= Type 919 hospital ship =

Chinese hospital ship

Class overview
- Operators: People's Liberation Army Navy

General characteristics
- Type: Hospital ship
- Displacement: 4000 – 5000 tons
- Propulsion: Marine Diesel
- Electronic warfare & decoys: None
- Armament: Unarmed
- Armour: None
- Aircraft carried: None
- Aviation facilities: helipad

The Type 919 hospital ship is a type of hospital ship (AH) built in the People’s Republic of China (PRC) for the People's Liberation Army Navy (PLAN). Type 919 hospital ship has received NATO reporting name Anshen class (Chinese: 安神). Two ships have been built by end of 2021.

Displaced more than four thousand tons when fully loaded, Type 919 hospital ship is designed to fill the gap between smaller Qiongsha-class ambulance transport (APH) and much larger Type 920 hospital ship (AH). Type 919 hospital ship is equipped with more than a hundred hospital beds, internal medicine, ophthalmology, otorhinolaryngology, psychology and surgery departments, and can support three surgeries to be performed onboard simultaneously. In addition, the ship is also equipped with helipad.

Pennant No.	Name (Transliteration)	Name (Chinese)	Namesake	Commissioned	Fleet	Status	Note
861	You'ai	友愛	Friendship	2020	South Sea Fleet	Active	Former Nan-Yi 12
862	Youhao	友好	Friendly	2020	South Sea Fleet	Active	Former Nan-Yi 13
