= Heilongjiang University =

National University in Harbin, China

- 黑龍江大學
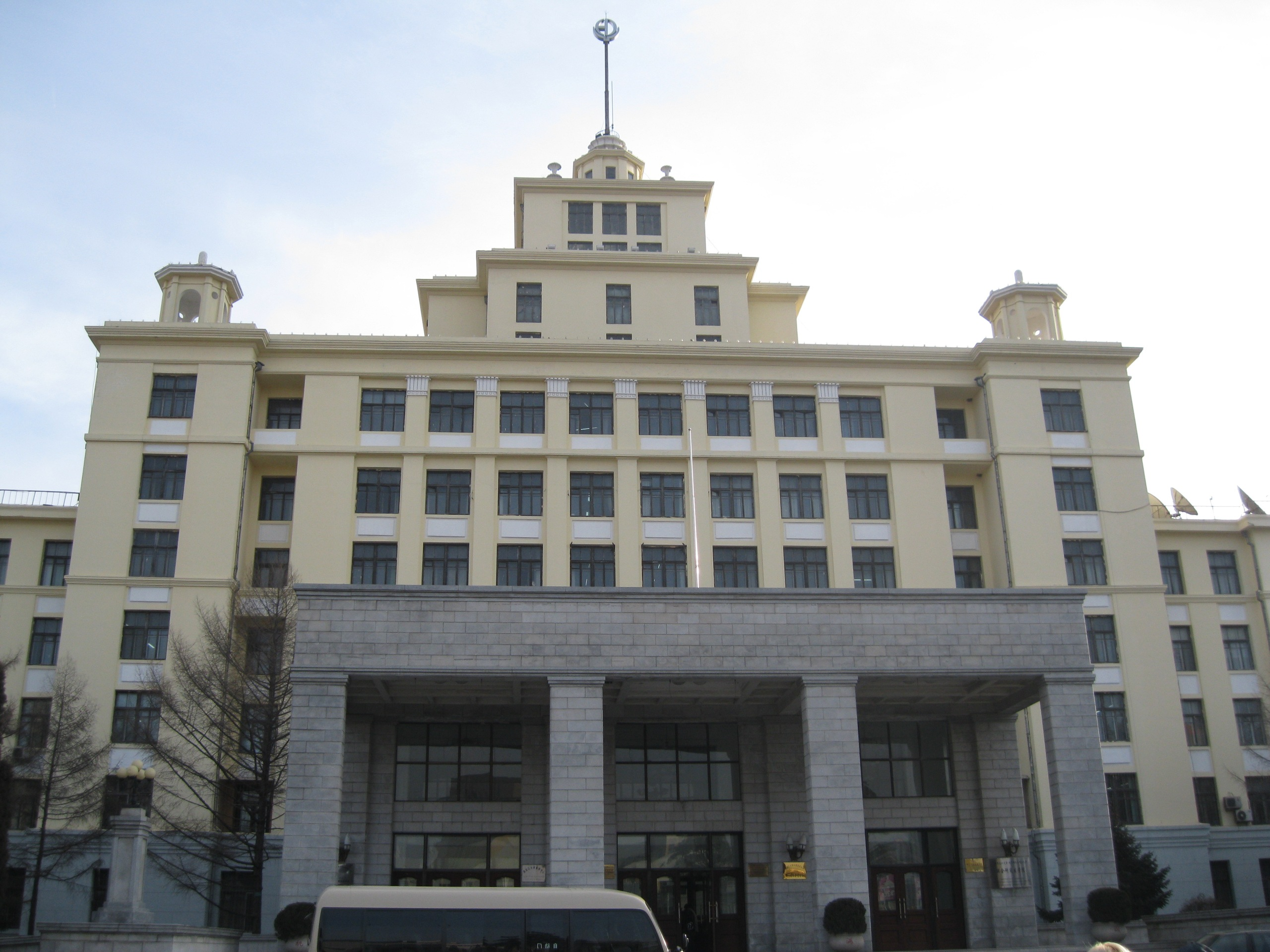
- Motto: 博學慎思，參天盡物
- Type: Public university
- Established: September 22, 1941
- President: Fu Honggang
- Faculty: 3,200
- Undergraduates: 35,000
- Postgraduates: 5,000
- Location: Harbin, Heilongjiang, China; 45.7070°N 126.6170°E
- Website: hlju.edu.cn

The Heilongjiang University (黑龙江大学; HLJU) is a provincial public university in the Harbin, Heilongjiang, China. The university is affiliated with the Province of Heilongjiang. It is co-sponsored by the Province of Heilongjiang, the Ministry of Education, and SASTIND.

The university was established in March 1941, in the revolutionary base area of the Chinese Communist Revolution, Yan'an. It dates back to the Chinese People's Counter-Japanese Invasion Military and Political University's Third School Division Russian Language Column (中国人民抗日军事政治大学第三分校俄文队), an institute dedicated to the training of military translators.

== History ==
The university was built in 1941. It had several names, it was called the Yan'an School of Foreign Languages (Chinese Military and Politics University of the Anti-Japanese Invasion) in the time of the early 1940s. After the PLA's liberation in 1946, the Foreign Language School moved to Harbin as an academic institution conducted by the HQ of the Northeastern Democratic Army (also a group of the PLA). In 1958, the school was extended and rebuilt as the University of Heilongjiang.

== Reputation ==
The University of Heilongjiang is a Provincial conducted 211 university and a Provincial key university. It is famous in languages, commercial law, Marxism philosophy, business study, and water conservation.

It offers the only Manchu language program in China. The University of Heilongjiang's Russian Language Studies program is considered to be the best in China. The Russian center is one of 1 of the only 3 Russian centers established in China by Russia. The library of Heilongjiang University has 5.1 million books, and as such is the biggest library in Heilongjiang Province. Xuefu bookstore of Heilongjiang University is also the largest bookstore in Heilongjiang Province.

=== Rankings ===
The highest-ranked programs are Russian Philology and Manchuphilology, which is the only Manchu philology program in China, ranking #1. The second highest-ranking programs are at 4th rank including Marxist Philosophy, 0502 Foreign Language and Literature, and Chinese ethnic language and literature. Right after the 4th rank, Business English is ranked 5. Then following #5 Library Science and Civil and Commercial Law are ranked 7. Arabic Philology is ranked 9 and Japanese Philology 10. The last two rankings are 0101 Philosophy at #11 and Translation at #12.

== Academics ==
=== Liberal Arts Colleges ===
- College of Philology
- College of Journalism and Communication
- College of Historical and Cultural Tourism
- College of Public Management and Philosophy
- College of Marxism Philosophy
- College of Economic and Business Administration
- College of Information Management
- College of Law
- College of Fine Arts
- College of Education
- International Cultural Education College
- Defense Education Institute (managed by the university and Northern Military Area Command HQ)

=== Science Colleges ===
- College of Mathematical Sciences
- College of Physical Science and Technology
- College of Electronic Engineering
- College of Chemistry, Chemical Engineering and Materials
- College of Computer Science Technology
- College of Life Science
- College of Software
- College of Agricultural Resources and Environment
- College of Architecture and Engineering
- College of Information Science and Technology
- College of Electrical and Mechanical Engineering
- College of Water Conservancy and Electric Power

=== Language Colleges ===
- College of Chinese Language and Literature
- College of Russian Philology
- College of Western (European) Languages
- College of Eastern (Asian) Languages
- College of Application of Foreign Language

=== Teaching Departments ===
- Applied Foreign Language Teaching Department
- Sports Department

=== Other Colleges ===
- College of Vocational and Technical
- Community College Department
- Adult Education College
- People's Armed College

=== Research Institutions ===
- Russian Language Literature Research Center
- The Manchu Language Culture Research Center
- Russia Research Department
- Cultural and Philosophy Research Center
- Chinese-French (Economic) Institute (joint program with Paris Nanterre University, France)
- Chinese-Russian Institute (joint program with Novosibirsk State University, Russia)
- Graduate College (joint program with Far Eastern Federal University, Russia)

== Campus ==
The University of Heilongjiang consists of the main campus, the south campus, the Hulan campus, the Jianqiao College campus (independent), the People's Armed Forces College campus, and the Heilongjiang Biological Science College campus, with a total area of more than 191 million square meters and a total construction area of 1.16 million square meters. It has more than 34,000 students, with 30 sponsoring entities and teaching college-level units and independent secondary colleges.

Heilongjiang University has five post-doctoral research mobile (work) stations; a level two subjects and 16 subjects have the right to grant a doctorate, 13 disciplines, and 112 secondary-level subjects have the right to grant master's degree, and another 6 professional degree-granting; 2 national key disciplines, 2 subject groups, one discipline, 21 provincial key disciplines for the second subject. Opening of the 10 disciplines, covering 75 undergraduate programs, including national characteristics, professional 10, 21 provincial key specialties.

It has equipment worth 300 million yuan, more than 5 million copies of book collections, a capacity of 40,000 students, a university city, a state-of-the-art laboratory building, a teaching building, 2 libraries, a gymnasium, 2 swimming gyms, 3 dining centers, school infrastructure, and broadband network, multimedia, and other modern teaching resources.

== Staff ==
The University of Heilongjiang has strong teachers, a teacher atmosphere, and talent gathered. The existing staff of more than 3,200, of which more than 2,000 full-time teachers, tutor 552 people, of teachers with senior professional titles and more than 900. Among them, was "National Renowned Teachers" 6 people, ranked 14th in college, out in the first local university; "National Excellent Teacher", "National Model Teacher" and other kinds of national, and provincial honor winner of more than 200 people; named "National Outstanding professional and technical personnel," one person, the national "Outstanding Young Expert" 7, "returned students Achievement Award" winner of a people, "Putin Award" winners 1 people, "Pushkin Medal" winner of five people, "New Century Talents Project 100 million national candidates," 4, the Ministry of Education "in the New Century Excellent Talents" was selected and 8 of them, "enjoy special government allowances officer" 73.

== International cooperation ==
The University of Heilongjiang has substantive cooperation and exchanges with 140 colleges worldwide. These include the UK's Leeds University and Bradford University, the University of Illinois, USA, the University of Paris X, France, Hunan University, South Korea and Japan's Niigata University, and so on. In almost 30 years(from 1981), more than 8,500 students have studied here. Meanwhile, Heilongjiang University attracts a large number of students from South Korea, Japan, Russia, Germany, the UK, Africa, and the United States to study Chinese language and International business every year.

Heilongjiang University is the base of teaching Chinese as a foreign language in Heilongjiang Province. The university is the appointed institution of HSK and is the institution admitting international students under the Chinese government scholarship program. The University of Heilongjiang has the first Confucius Institute in Russia and a joint graduate school with Far Eastern Federal University, Russia. University of Heilongjiang has created the "Northeastern base of International Chinese language promotion" with Jilin University, Liaoning University and Yanbian University.

The University of Heilongjiang is host to a range of foreign exchange students, primarily Russian and Korean. In recent years, Fulbright Fellows studying Mandarin Chinese through the National Security Language Initiative have studied at Heilongjiang University.

== Notable people ==
- Ha Jin, the only Chinese writer with a U.S. National Book Award, PEN / Faulkner Award in Fiction Award
- Qi Huaiyuan: Former vice foreign minister, China's first foreign ministry spokesman, the 9th CPPCC member, and vice director of the foreign affairs committee. 13th Central Committee alternate committee, the 14th Central committee
- Yan Mingfu: Chairman Mao Zedong's translator, former Minister of CPC Central Committee United Front Work Department, former Vice Chairman of the CPC Central Committee, former Vice Minister of Civil Affairs, the former president of China Charity Federation
- Zhang Jinshu: Chairman Mao Zedong's Translator
- Zhang Lian: Former Ambassador in Japan
- Guan Hengguang: First Ambassador to Uzbekistan, former the Ambassador in Lithuania
- Li Fenglin: Former Ambassador in Russia
- Pan Zhanlin: Former Chinese Ambassador to Kyrgyzstan, Ukraine, Yugoslavia and Israel, now the Tenth CPPCC National Committee
- Wang Ganghua: Former ambassador in Ecuador
- Zhang Dake: Former ambassador in Yugoslavia
- Teng Shaozhi: Former ambassador in Bulgaria
- Hou Zhitong: Former ambassador of China disarmament affairs
- Wang Nongsheng: Ambassador In Papua New Guinea, Samoa
- Zhang Lian: Ambassador in Sri Lanka and the maldives
- Wang Guixin: Ambassador in Norway, the Netherlands
- Yu Longhuai: Ministry of Aeronautics and Astronautics, research institute 1, vice-president, "Aoxing" and "Long March 2k" Commander
- Zhang Zuoyi: Governor of Heilongjiang province, CCP 16th Central committee
- Yan Xuetong: Tsinghua University international research institute of international relations, the department head
- Liu Donghui: Heilongjiang Province National People's Congress standing committee, deputy director, secretary
- Zhu Lin: PRC StateCouncil DC office, director
- Xu Ran, writer
- Yan Mingfu: the National Committee of the Chinese People's Political Consultative Conference, Vice Chairman, The central committee of the communist party TongZhanBu, minister
- Ye Zhengda: Lieutenant General
- Xue Hong: Global domain management agencies user advisory committee, the executive committee
- Fu Jianzhong: Xinzhou Group, Chairman
- Wang Acheng: Writers Association of Harbin, Chairman, Writers Association of Heilong Jiang Province, Vice Chairman
- Meng Fanxu: Heilongjiang Lawyers Association, President
- Zhou Airuo: Lu Xun literal College, President
- Wang Liping: Deputy secretary of the CCP Shanghai committee, Vice chairman of the Shanghai CPPCC
- Jiang Daming, governor of Shandong Province
- Wu Guohua: NPC standing committee, deputy director of Zhejiang province, the standing committee of the eighth construction, the 9th CPPCC national committee members
- Li Shan: Artist
- Yuan Libo: Harbin Engineering University, College of Science, Dean
- Yu Liancheng: China mechanical Electronics (Thailand) Co., LTD. and Asia-pacific electron (Laos) Co., LTD, CEO
- Deng Zhenbo: City University of Hong Kong, visiting scholar
- Lu Shizhen: China Social Work Education Association, vice chairman
- Liu Keli: China international trust and investment in science and technology limited liability company, VP
- Yu Haijiang: The language learning center, consultant, 《Foreign abstract》Editor and deputy editor, 《Chinese-English dictionary collocation》editor
- Zhuge Yibing, Renmin University Professor
- Li Longyun, Writer
- Hu Yongzhu, Lieutenant General, Chengdu Military Region
- Du Yuxin: Heilongjiang provincial party committee, vice secretary of central committee alternate committee member
- Liu Xiaojiang, admiral, former political commissar of the PLA Navy
- Chen Qiushi: lawyer and journalist who provided coverage of the 2019-2020 Hong Kong protests and COVID-19 pandemic
