= Liu Xiaojiang =

Chinese admiral

- 刘晓江

Political Commissar of the People's Liberation Army Navy
- In office July 2008 – December 2014
- Commander: Wu Shengli
- Preceded by: Hu Yanlin
- Succeeded by: Miao Hua

Personal details
- Born: December 1949 (age 76) Xi'an, Shaanxi, China
- Party: Chinese Communist Party
- Spouse: Li Heng (daughter of Hu Yaobang)
- Education: Heilongjiang University

Military service
- Allegiance: China
- Branch/service: People's Liberation Army Navy
- Years of service: 1970−2014
- Rank: Admiral

Liu Xiaojiang (Chinese: 刘晓江; born December 1949) is a retired Chinese admiral who served as Political Commissar of the People's Liberation Army Navy (PLAN) from 2008 to 2014. He is the son-in-law of former General Secretary of the Chinese Communist Party Hu Yaobang.

== Early life ==
Liu was born in Xi'an, Shaanxi Province, of Ji'an, Jiangxi ancestry. He is the son of Liu Haibin (刘海滨), a Red Army veteran, and the son-in-law of Hu Yaobang, former General Secretary of the Chinese Communist Party. He is therefore considered a princeling general.

In 1968, at the height of the Cultural Revolution, Liu was forced to work on a rural commune in Xixiang County, Shaanxi, as an "educated youth". He remained there for two years before joining the military.

Liu entered the PLA Ground Force in 1970 as a soldier in the railroad corps, and was eventually made a platoon leader. At some point in the 1970s he became a political officer, and served as director of the Propaganda Department for a ground forces division.

Most likely due to the upheaval of the early Cultural Revolution, which brought higher education in China to a standstill, Liu did not begin his undergraduate education until age 23, two years after joining the PLA. From April 1972 to January 1975, Liu studied at the Chinese Department of Heilongjiang University.

== Career ==
From 1978 to 1980, Liu served in the PLA General Staff Department (GSD) as secretary of the Headquarters Office of the GSD Communications Department. From 1980 to 1983, Liu served as personal secretary to the powerful former PLA Navy commander and Central Military Commission (CMC) vice-chair Liu Huaqing.

In 1984, Liu Xiaojiang was assigned to the PLA General Political Department (GPD), serving as deputy director of the Planning and Assignments Division (计划调配处) within the GPD's Cadre Department, a department responsible for a wide range of personnel matters. From December 1992 to August 1998, he served as deputy director of this division, and was later promoted to director of the GPD's Cultural Department.

In 1998, at age 49, Liu took his first navy billet, becoming deputy director of the PLA Navy's Political Department, a Grade 5 (corps leader) position. Soon afterwards, Liu was appointed head of a special investigative task force for the navy following the Yuanhua case, a major corruption scandal that implicated hundreds of CCP personnel, including GPD Intelligence Chief General Ji Shengde. Two years later, he was appointed to the Navy Discipline Inspection Committee, the main body responsible for handling illegal activity or violations of CCP discipline within the navy. Liu was also made a member of the CCP-wide 16th Central Commission for Discipline Inspection. In 2009, Liu published a lengthy article in the PLA Daily, recounting his work on the Yuanhua affair and discussing steps the PLA should take to address the challenge of corruption.

Liu became political commissar of the PLA Navy after his predecessor, Hu Yanlin, retired in 2008. Liu was elected as a full member to the 17th CCP Central Committee in 2007 and the 18th CCP Central Committee in 2012. Liu retired from military service in December 2014, after reaching the maximum retirement age of 65. Miao Hua succeeded him as Navy commissar.

== Personal ==
Liu Xiaojiang is married to Li Manmei (also known as Li Heng), the daughter of former CCP general secretary Hu Yaobang, a political moderate whose death in 1989 was a major contributing event to the 1989 Tiananmen Square protests and massacre. In Li Manmei's 2005 memoir about her father, she recounts how Liu joined her three brothers in carrying wreathes for the December 1990 ceremony at which Hu's ashes were interred.
