= North Sea Fleet =

Chinese naval fleet

Northern Theater Command Navy
- The People's Liberation Army Navy jack and ensign
- Active: 1950–Present
- Country: People's Republic of China
- Allegiance: Chinese Communist Party
- Branch: People's Liberation Army Navy
- Type: Naval fleet
- Part of: Northern Theater Command
- Garrison/HQ: Yuchi Naval Base, Qingdao, Shandong, China

Commanders
- Commander: Vice Admiral Wang Dazhong
- Political Commissar: Vice Admiral Fu Yaoquan

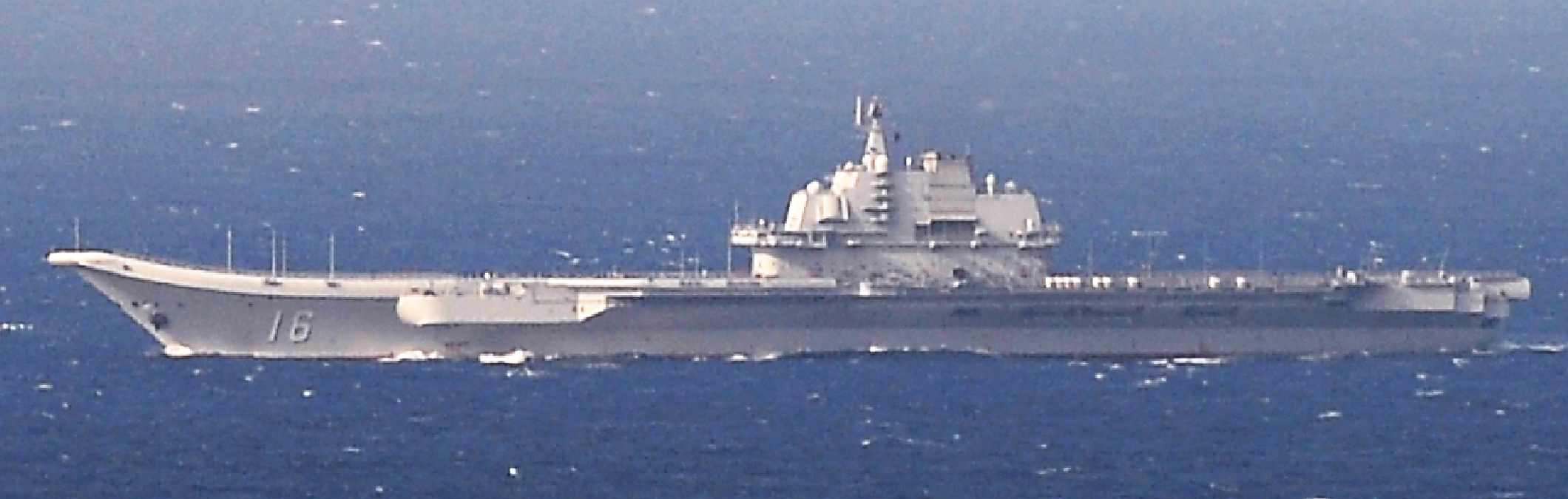
The aircraft carrier Liaoning in the East China Sea

The North Sea Fleet (NSF; 北海舰队), concurrently the Northern Theater Command Navy (北部战区海军), is one of the three fleets of China's People's Liberation Army Navy. Headquartered in Qingdao, Shandong, the fleet provides naval forces to the Northern Theater Command.

In September 1950, the Qingdao Army Base was redesignated as a naval base. Following the departure of the Soviet Navy from Lüshunkou (Port Arthur), the North Sea Fleet was established in 1960 with naval bases in Qingdao and Lüshunkou.

The fleet currently includes China's first aircraft carrier, Liaoning, as well as nuclear-powered attack and missile submarines.

The North Sea Fleet was historically the most capable of the Navy's three fleets, being the first in China to operate destroyers, shore-based missiles and nuclear submarines. In recent years however, the shift in strengthening of importance and strategic capabilities of the East and South Sea Fleets are more prioritised.

== Bases ==
- Yuchi Naval Base - Headquarters
- Jianggezhuang Naval Base

== See also ==
- People's Liberation Army Navy
  - East Sea Fleet
  - South Sea Fleet
- Beiyang Fleet of the Qing navy from 1875 to 1898
