= South Sea Fleet =

Chinese naval fleet

Southern Theater Command Navy
- The People's Liberation Army Navy's jack and ensign
- Active: 1955–present
- Country: China
- Allegiance: Chinese Communist Party
- Branch: People's Liberation Army Navy
- Type: Naval fleet
- Part of: Southern Theater Command
- Garrison/HQ: Zhanjiang, China
- Engagements: Battle of the Paracel Islands

The Southern Theater Command Navy (STCN), or the South Sea Fleet (SSF) until 2018, is a formation of China's People's Liberation Army Navy (PLAN) and the naval component of the Southern Theater Command.

== History ==
In December 1949, the Fourth Field Army transferred personnel from the 15th Army to create the Guangdong Military Region Riverine Defense Command. The Riverine Defense Command commanded the Wanshan Archipelago Campaign in May to August 1950 and was the "nucleus" of the South Central China Military Region Navy created by the Fourth Field Army in December 1950. The military region's navy became the PLAN's South Sea Fleet in 1955.

The SSF won the Battle of the Paracel Islands against South Vietnam in 1974. China's first anti-piracy patrol to Somalia deployed from the SSF in December 2008.

== Components ==
STCN headquarters is at Zhanjiang, with bases in Sanya, Zhanjiang, Guangzhou, Beihai, Shangchuan island, Xiachuan island and Angshuizhou Naval Base. The bases at Sanya include Yulin Naval Base and Longpo Naval Base, the latter for nuclear submarines. It controls coastal defenses west from to Dongshan County and in the South China Sea.

Subunits included:

- Sanya Naval General Support Base
  - Type 002 class aircraft carrier Shandong (17)
- 2nd Destroyer Brigade base at Zhanjiang Naval base (Note: Zhidui is a division leader grade organization variously translated as "flotilla", "naval ship brigade", or "detachment".)
  - 4 Type 052D class destroyer (Luyang III)
    - Xinin (117)
    - Guiyang (119)
    - Zhaotong (164)
    - Zhanjiang (165)
  - 2 Type 052B class destroyer (Luyang)
    - Guangzhou (168)
    - Wuhan (169)
  - 1 Type 051B class destroyer (Luhai)
    - Shenzhen (167)
  - 5 Type 054A class frigate (Jiangkai II)
    - Hengyang (568)
    - Yulin (569)
    - Huangshan (570)
    - Yuncheng (571)
    - Hengshui (572)
- 9th Destroyer Brigade base at Yulin Naval Base
  - 4 Type 055 class destroyer (Renhai)
    - Dalian (105)
    - Yan'an (106)
    - Zunyi (107)
    - Xianyang (108)
  - 8 Type 052D class destroyer
    - Hohhot (161)
    - Nanning (162)
    - Jiujiang (163)
    - Kunming (172)
    - Changsha (173)
    - Hefei (174)
    - Yinchuan (175)
    - Loudi (176)
  - 2 Type 052C class destroyer (Luyang II)
    - Lanzhou (170)
    - Haikou (171)
  - 1 Type 054B class frigate (Jiangkai III)
    - Qinzhou (555)
  - 5 Type 054A class frigate (Jiangkai II)
    - Hunan (531)
    - Xuchang (536)
    - Liuzhou (573)
    - Sanya (574)
    - Yueyang (575)
- 17th Frigate Brigade base at Guangzhou Naval Base
  - 6 Type 056A class corvette (Jiangdao II)
    - Ganzhou (620)
    - Wenshan (621)
    - Beise (622)
    - Wenshan (623)
    - Suizhou (624)
    - Suining (646)
    - Nanchong (647)
- 18th Frigate Brigade base at Beihai Naval Base
  - 12 Type 056A class corvette (Jiangdao II)
    - Hanzhong) (648)
    - Guangyuan (649)
    - Dongguan (607)
    - Bazhong (625)
    - Ngô Châu (626)
    - Enshi (627)
    - Yongzhou (628)
    - Tongling (629)
    - Ngawa (630)
    - Tianmen (630)
    - Qujing (668)
    - Liupanshui (669)
- 19th Frigate Brigade base at Yulin Naval Base
  - 7 Type 054A class frigate (Jiangkai II)
    - Xianning (500)
    - Bayannur (551)
    - Chenzhou (552)
    - Dali (553)
    - Tongliao (554)
    - Ordos (580)
  - 1 Type 053H3 class frigate (Jianghu IV)
    - Mianyang (528)
  - 5 Type 056A class corvette (Jiangdao II)
    - Xuancheng (535)
    - Meizhou (583)
    - Chaozhou (595)
    - Huizhou (596)
    - Luan (611)
- Angshuizhou Naval Base in Kunlun, Hongkong
  - 2 Type 056A class corvette (Jiangdao II)
    - Suqian (666)
    - Jingmen (667)
- Yalong Naval Base
  - 4 Type 093 class submarine
    - Long march 14 (407)
    - Long march 13 (408)
    - Long march 1 (409)
    - Long march 2 (410)
  - 6 Type 094 class submarine
    - Long march 9 (411)
    - Long march 10 (412)
    - Long march 11 (413)
    - Long march 12 (414)
    - Long march 17 (417)
    - Long march 18 (421)
- 32nd Submarine Brigade base at Yulin Naval Base
  - 5 Type 039B class submarine (Yuan)
    - Great wall 342
    - Great wall 343
    - Great wall 344
    - Great wall 345
    - Great wall 346
  - 2 Type 039A class submarine (Yuan)
    - Great wall 326
    - Great wall 329
- 52nd Submarine Brigade base at Xiachuan island
  - 4 Type 039G class submarine (Song)
    - Great wall 314
    - Great wall 315
    - Great wall 316
    - Great wall 318
  - 3 Type 636 class submarine (Kilo)
    - Long March 371
    - Long March 372
    - Long March 373
- 72nd Submarine Brigade base at Yulin Naval Base
  - 4 Type 039A class submarine (Yuan)
    - Great wall 330
    - Great wall 331
    - Great wall 332
    - Great wall 333
  - 2 Type 039B class submarine (Yuan)
    - Great wall 334
    - Great wall 335
- 10th Minesweeper Brigade base at Beihai Naval Base
  - 5 Type 081 class minesweeper ship
    - Kaiping (809)
    - Xiaoyi (841)
    - Taishan (842)
    - Changsh (843)
    - Heshan (844)
  - 2 Type 082II class minesweeper ship
    - Liufeng (816)
    - Yangjiang (817)
- 11th Fastboat Squadrons base at Shangchuan island (Note: Dadui is a regiment leader grade organization in the PLAN sometimes translated as "squadron".)
  - 22 Type 022 class fast attack craft
    - (2208)
    - (2209)
    - (2210)
    - (2211)
    - (2212)
    - (2213)
    - (2214)
    - (2306)
    - (2307)
    - (2308)
    - (2309)
    - (2310)
    - (2311)
    - (2312)
    - (2313)
    - (2314)
    - (2401)
    - (2402)
    - (2403)
    - (2404)
    - (2405)
    - (2406)
- 6th Amphibious Assault Brigade base at Yulin Naval Base
  - 2 Type 075 class landing helicopter dock (Yushen)
    - Hainan (31), equipped 3 Type 726 class LCAC: (3320), (3321) and (3322)
    - Hubei (34), equipped 3 Type 726A class LCAC: (3330), 3331) and (3332).
  - 6 Type 074A class landing ship (Yubei)
    - (3207)
    - (3208)
    - (3281)
    - (3315)
    - (3316)
    - (3317)
  - 6 Type 073A class landing ship (Yudao)
    - Huashan (945)
    - Songshan (946)
    - Lushan (947)
    - Xueshan (948)
    - Hengshan (949)
    - Taishan (950)
  - 6 Type 072III class landing ship (Yudeng I)
    - Emeishan (991)
    - Danxiashan (934)
    - Xuefengshan (935)
    - Haiyangshan (936)
    - Qingchengshan (937)
    - Luliangshan (938)
  - 6 Type 072A class landing ship (Ngọc Đình II)
    - Huadingshan (992)
    - Luoxiaoshan (993)
    - Dayunshan (994)
    - Wanyangshan (995)
    - Laotieshan (996)
    - Yunwushan (997)
  - 5 Type 071 class amphibious transport dock (Yuzhao)
    - Qilianshan (985)
    - Wuzhishan (987)
    - Changbaishan (989)
    - Kunlunshan (998)
    - Jinggangshan (999)
  - 7 Type 958 class LCAC (Zubr)
    - (3325)
    - (3326)
    - (3327)
    - (3328)
    - (3329)
    - (3330)
    - (3331)
- 3rd Combat Support Brigade base at Zhanjiang Naval Base
  - 2 Type 901 class replenishment ship
    - Hulunhu (901)
    - Chaganhu (905)
  - 5 Type 903A class replenishment ship (Fuchi)
    - Weishanhu (887)
    - Dọngianghu (892)
    - Ulungur hu(893)
    - Honghu (906)
    - Luomahu (907)
  - 1 Type 904 class replenishment ship
    - Fuxianhu (888)
  - 1 Type 904A class replenishment ship (Danyao I)
    - Dongtinghu (883)
  - 2 Type 904B class replenishment ship (Danyao II)
    - Junshanhu (961)
    - Luguhu (962)
  - 1 Type 908 class replenishment ship
    - Qinghaihu (885)
  - 1 Type 925 class submarine support ship (Dajiang)
    - Yongxingdao (863)
  - 1 Type 711 class semi-submersible ship
    - Yinmahu (834)
  - 1 Type 920 class hospital ship (Anwei)
    - Silk Road Ark (867)
  - 2 Type 919 class hospital ship (Anshen)
    - You'ai (861)
    - Youhao (862)
  - 2 Type 921 class ambulance craft (Ankang)
    - Nanyi 10
    - Nanyi 11
- Electronic Surveillance Squadrons
  - Type 815 class electronic surveillance ship (Dongliao)
    - Neptune (792)
    - Uranus (793)
    - Dubhe (797)
- 8th Naval Air Division
  - ASW Regiment, equipped KQ-200
  - AWACS Regiment, equipped KJ-500H
  - Reconnaissance regiment, equipped Y-8JB
  - Technical Support Battalion
  - Radar Battalion
  - Guard Battalion
- 31st Naval Infantry Air Brigade basr in Hainan (31) LHD
  - Attack Helicopter Battalion, equipped 18-24 Z-10 and Z-19
  - 2 Utility Helicopter Battalion, equipped 24-32 Z-20J
  - Heavy Transport Battalion, equipped 12-16 Z-8C and Z-18
  - UAV Battalion, equipped 12 UAV.
  - Technical Support Battalion.
- 7th Air Defense Brigade
  - Long range SAM Battalion, equipped 4-6 HQ-9.
  - 2 Medium-Short range SAM Battalions, equipped 8-12 HQ-6A and LD-2000 CIWS.
  - MANPADS Battalion, equipped HN-6B.
  - Combat Support Battalion.
  - Technical Support Battalion.
  - Logistics Support Battalion.
- 1st Marine Brigade
  - 3 Naval Infantry Battalions.
  - 1 Air Assault Battalion.
  - 1 Reconnaissance Battalion.
  - 1 Artillery Battalion.
  - 1 Air Defense Battalion.
  - 1 Combat Support Battalion.
  - 1 Logistics Support Battalion.
- 2nd Marine Brigade
  - 3 Naval Infantry Battalions.
  - 1 Air Assault Battalion.
  - 1 Reconnaissance Battalion.
  - 1 Artillery Battalion.
  - 1 Air Defense Battalion.
  - 1 Combat Support Battalion.
  - 1 Logistics Support Battalion.
