= Leopoldo Laroya =

Leopoldo V. Laroya
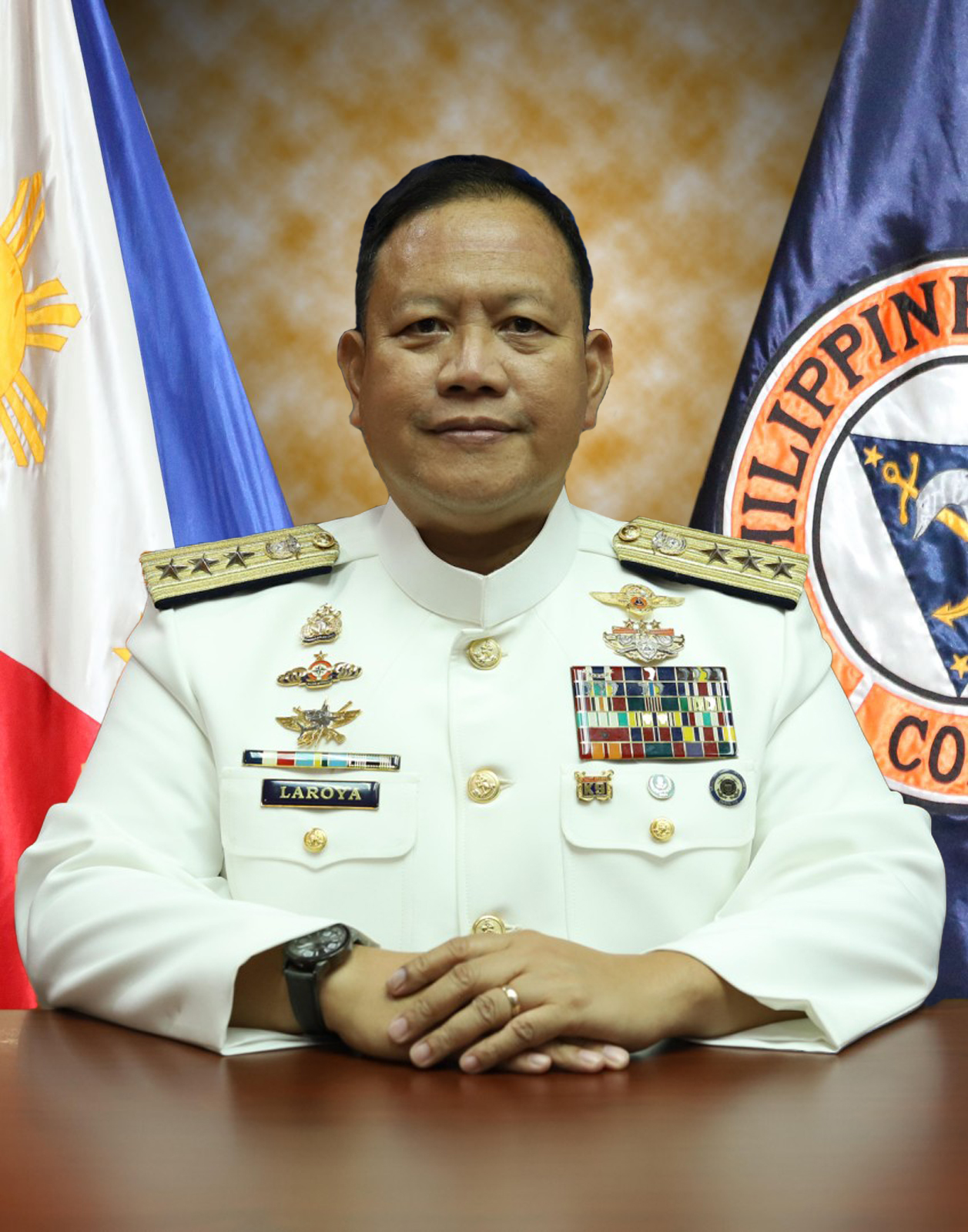
- Coast Guard Admiral Leopoldo V Laroya, Commandant of the Philippine Coast Guard

28th Commandant of the Philippine Coast Guard
- In office 8 September 2021 – 10 February 2022
- President: Rodrigo Duterte
- Preceded by: Admiral George V. Ursabia Jr.
- Succeeded by: Vice Admiral Eduardo D. Fabricante (Officer-In-Charge); Admiral Artemio M. Abu (Commandant)

Personal details
- Born: February 11, 1966 (age 60) Quezon City, Philippines
- Education: Philippine Military Academy; World Maritime University (MSEP)

Military service
- Allegiance: Philippines
- Branch/service: Philippine Coast Guard
- Years of service: 1988–2022
- Rank: Admiral
- Unit: Commandant of the Philippine Coast Guard; Deputy Commandant for Operations; Maritime Safety Services Command; Coast Guard Education, Training and Doctrine Command; Maritime Security and Law Enforcement Command; Coast Guard District Western Visayas; Coast Guard District Northwestern Luzon; Coast Guard District Southwestern Mindanao; Coast Guard District NCR - Central Luzon; Coast Guard District Bicol; Coast Guard Liaison Office; Coast Guard Intelligence Force; BRP Batangas (SARV-004); BRP Nueva Vizcaya (SARV-3502)

'Leopoldo "Leo" Velarde Laroya' is a Filipino Admiral (born February 11, 1966) who served as the 28th Commandant of the Philippine Coast Guard. Prior to his promotion as commandant, he also served as the Deputy Commandant for Operations, and led three commands: the Maritime Safety Services Command, the Coast Guard Education, Training and Doctrine Command and the Maritime Security and Law Enforcement Command.

== Early life and education ==
Laroya was born in Quezon City on February 11, 1966, and served as a second child among three male siblings. Laroya came from a military family, wherein both his grandfather and his father are graduates from the Philippine Military Academy (PMA). Laroya's grandfather, Brigadier General Nicanor Velarde Sr., graduated the PMA in 1929 and served the United States Army, before being moved to the Philippine Army, and served during World War 2, while his father, Brigadier General Protacio Laroya, graduated in 1956, and served the Philippine Constabulary. His mother, Elenita Laroya, also worked at the Philippine Veterans Bank and the AFP Retirement and Separation Benefits System. Laroya studied at the Colegio San Agustin – Makati, the Don Bosco Technical Institute of Makati, and became an exchange student in Comfrey, Minnesota, where he finished high school, and became an engineering student at the University of the Philippines Diliman before he entered the PMA in 1983, and graduated as a member of the PMA "Maringal" class of 1988. Laroya graduated with honors as he was in 12th place within his classmates, and was awarded the Engineering Sciences Award.

Laroya finished his postgraduate degree at the World Maritime University in Malmö, Sweden, where he earned his master's degree in Maritime Safety and Environmental Protection (MSEP) and also entered various courses locally and abroad, such as the Naval Officer Candidate Course.

== Career ==
Laroya served aboard ships within the Philippine Navy and the Coast Guard as an officer aboard the BRP Badjao (AE-59), the BRP Catanduanes (PG-62), and the BRP Tirad Pass (AU-100), until he skippered two ships, the BRP Nueva Vizcaya (SARV-3502), and the BRP Batangas (SARV-004) as well as the BFAR MCS 3010, which earned him his Command-at-Sea Badge. Laroya served under the Department of Transportation for a combined term of 4 years, where he was named as the executive assistant to then-Secretary of Transportation Amado S. Lagdameo, and was also designated as the head executive assistant to then-Secretary of Transportation Arturo Enrile, and in 1998, he held his post as the chief of staff under then-DOTC undersecretary Arturo Valdez, and as the head of the Coast Guard Liaison Office, under then-Secretary of Presidential Communications Office Herminio Coloma Jr. Laroya was posted within other commands and staff positions, such as the Assistant Chief of Staff for Maritime Safety, until he served under the Coast Guard Intelligence Force, wherein he served for five years under the command until he was named the commander of the Coast Guard Intelligence Force for two years, and also served as the Deputy Commander and Acting Commander of the Marine Environmental Protection Command. Laroya also became the Station Commander: the Coast Guard Station Bacolod, and Coast Guard Station Manila and became the District Commander in five Coast Guard Districts: Coast Guard District Bicol, Coast Guard District NCR - Central Luzon, Coast Guard District Southwestern Mindanao, Coast Guard District Northwestern Luzon, and Coast Guard District Western Visayas, where he was promoted to the rank of commodore in 2012.

Laroya was named as the chief of staff in the PCG Headquarters, before being commander of the Maritime Security and Law Enforcement Command, and the Coast Guard Education, Training and Doctrine Command, where he was promoted to rear admiral in 2018, before being named as the commander of the Maritime Safety Services Command. Laroya was promoted to vice admiral in 2019 where he was named as the Deputy Commandant for Operations, before being named as the Commandant of the Philippine Coast Guard, and was promoted to the rank of admiral in November 2021. Laroya retired from service on February 10, 2021, and was replaced by Vice Admiral Eduardo D. Fabricante as the Coast Guard's Officer in Charge. 18 days later, Vice Admiral Fabricante was eventually replaced by Admiral Artemio Abu.

== Personal life ==
Laroya is married to Rowena Laroya, and they have a son, Lionel Zachary "Zach" Laroya.
