= Artemio Abu =

Filipino admiral

Artemio M. Abu
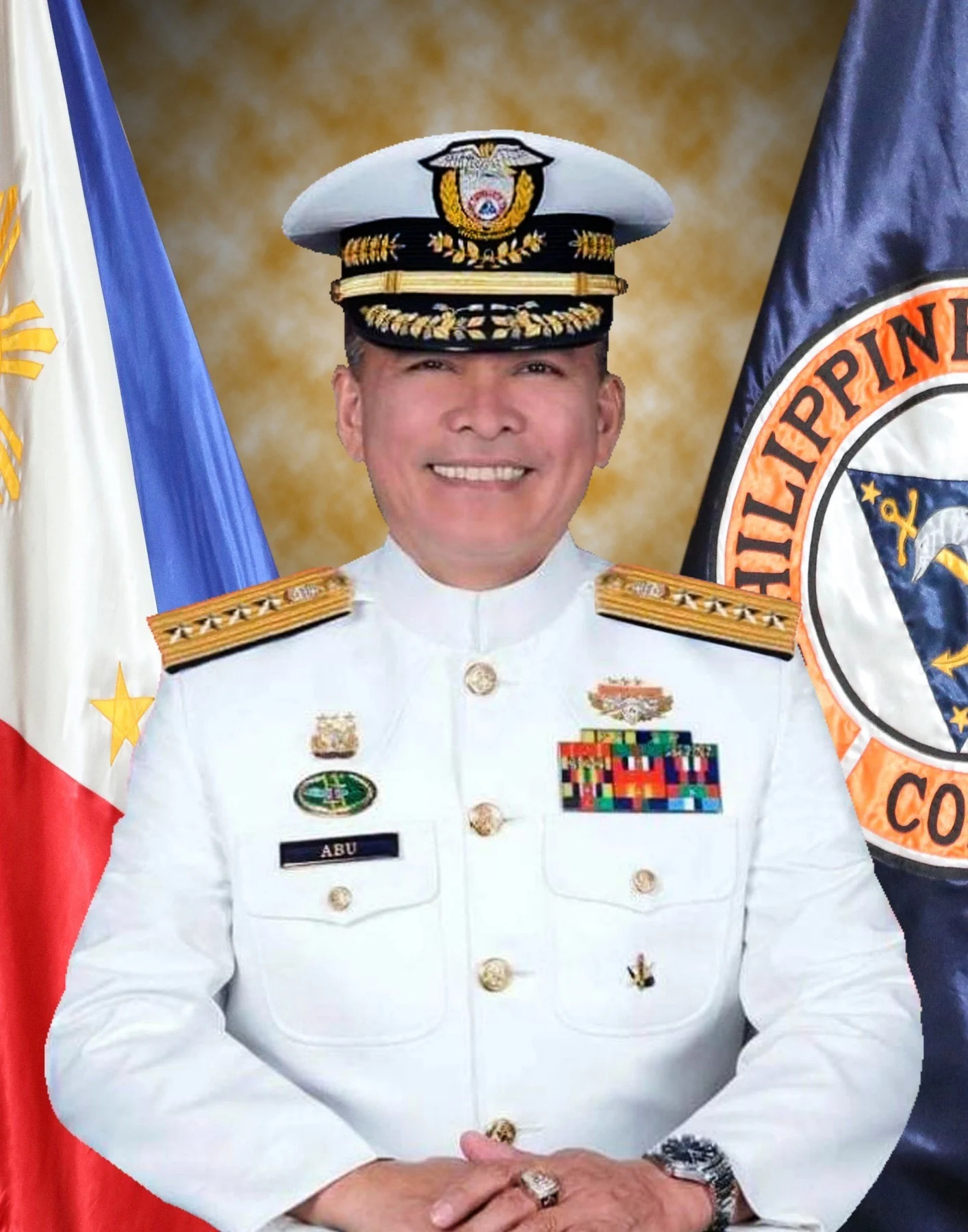

Mayor of Malvar, Batangas
- Incumbent
- Assumed office June 30, 2025
- Preceded by: Cristeta Reyes

29th Commandant of the Philippine Coast Guard
- In office March 1, 2022 – October 19, 2023
- President: Rodrigo Duterte; Bongbong Marcos
- Preceded by: Admiral Leopoldo V. Laroya (Commandant); Vice Admiral Eduardo D. Fabricante (Officer-In-Charge)
- Succeeded by: Admiral Ronnie Gil Gavan

Personal details
- Born: October 19, 1967 (age 58) Malvar, Batangas, Philippines
- Party: PFP
- Education: Philippine Military Academy (B.S); Dalhousie University (M.MM); Adamson University (LL.B) (dropped out)

Military service
- Branch/service: Philippine Coast Guard
- Years of service: 1992–2023
- Rank: Admiral
- Unit: Commandant of the Philippine Coast Guard; Maritime Safety Services Command; Coast Guard Education and Training Command; Task Force Kaligtasan sa Karagatan; Acting Commander, Marine Environmental Protection Command; Task Force Taal; Coast Guard District Southern Tagalog; Coast Guard District Southern Visayas; Coast Guard Ready Force; Coast Guard Station Palawan; Coast Guard Station Masbate; Coast Guard Station Camarines Norte; BRP EDSA II (SARV-002); BRP Ilocos Norte (SARV-3501); BFAR MCS 3008

Artemio Manalo Abu is a Filipino politician and retired admiral who was the 29th commandant of the Philippine Coast Guard. As commandant, he was the overall commander of the entire Coast Guard units and commands, and is also responsible for all operations within the Philippines' maritime jurisdictions. Prior to his post, he served as the commander of the Maritime Safety Services Command and the Coast Guard Education and Training Command.

Abu narrowly defeated Cristeta Reyes, who served the municipality for more than two decades, for the seat of Mayor of Malvar, Batangas.

== Early life and education ==
Abu was born at Barangay Luta Sur, Malvar, Batangas, and is the second child among 11 siblings. He came from a family of farmers and entered the public school system in Batangas throughout his life, where he once also served as the class valedictorian both in elementary and high school. Abu entered the Philippine Military Academy in 1988 and graduated at the upper half of his class, the Tanglaw-Diwa class of 1992. He also earned his master's degree in Marine Management at Dalhousie University in Halifax, Nova Scotia, Canada. Abu also earned some units while studying Bachelor of Laws at Adamson University in Manila, but dropped out a few months later.

He also completed various studies and courses locally and abroad, such as the VIP Protection and Security Course at the Presidential Security Group Training School in Malacanang Park, Manila, and the Global Maritime Distress and Safety System General Operator's Course. Abu also entered search and rescue courses such as the Maritime Search and Rescue Course at the Maritime Training Center in Fremantle, Western Australia, the Basic Firefighting Course at the Maritime Disaster Prevention Training Center in Yokosuka, Japan, and the Individual Training Course in Search and Rescue at the Japan Coast Guard Headquarters in Tokyo, Japan; as well as training sessions with the United States Coast Guard Training Center in Yorktown, Virginia, and with the China Coast Guard in Beijing, China; and crisis management programs at the Cranfield University.

== Career ==
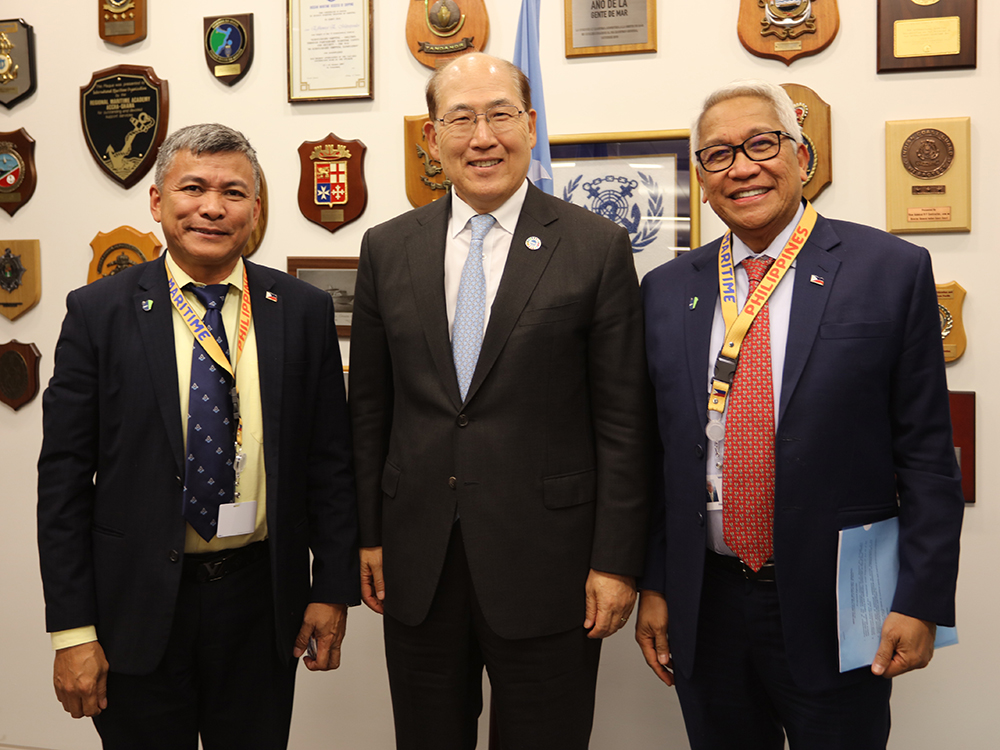
Abu (left) at the International Maritime Organization headquarters

On his junior years, Abu served officer aboard various ships of the Coast Guard and the Bureau of Fisheries and Aquatic Resources (BFAR) before being named as the commanding officer aboard three ships: the BFAR MCS 3008, the BRP Ilocos Norte (SARV-3501) and the BRP EDSA II (SARV-002), where after his tour of duty at sea, he earned his Command-at-Sea Badge, and earned the "Ship of the Year" awards on his tour of duty as commanding officer of the ships. Abu also served as the provincial head of Coast Guard forces in Camarines Norte, Masbate and in Palawan, where his command in various stations was awarded as the "Station of the Year". Abu also served as the director for academics, an instructor under the Coast Guard Education and Training Command, where he was assigned as Course Director of three various Coast Guard Officer Courses, and an evaluator for the maritime training council of the Philippines. Abu also represented the Philippines in various conferences worldwide, among them is the Maritime Safety and Risk Analysis conference in Nova Scotia, Canada and the Philippine-Japan-Indonesia Marine Pollution Exercise (MARPOLEX) in Sorong, Indonesia. He also served as the head of the Philippine delegation during the International Maritime Organization Conventions in three different locations, in London, in South Korea and in Thailand, as well as in seminars in Canada, United States, Hawaii, United Kingdom, France, Indonesia, Japan, Singapore, and on Western Australia.

Abu's operational assignments also include being a staff member of three directorate offices, namely the Weapons, Communications and Information System (CG-11), Ships and Aircraft Repair and Maintenance (CG-10), and Education and Training (CG-12). On the aftermath of the 2006 Guimaras oil spill, Abu served as one of the advisers for oil retrieval operations. He also served as the commander of the Coast Guard Ready Force, where he subsequently serves as a member of the technical design group for the acquisition of patrol vessels from France and Japan, which became known as the Boracay-class patrol boats, the BRP Gabriela Silang (OPV-8301) and the Parola-class patrol vessels.

Abu also served as commander of two Coast Guard Districts, the Coast Guard District Southern Visayas, and Coast Guard District Southern Tagalog; and also served as Acting Commander of the Marine Environmental Protection Command. In January 2020, during the 2020 Taal Volcano Eruption, Abu served as commander of the Task Force Taal, a task force responsible for search and rescue operations, mass evacuations, and aid distribution and assistance within residents living within the Taal Volcano and its surrounding areas. After his tour of duty within Task Force Taal, he was assigned under the Joint Task Force COVID Shield as a senior representative for the implementation of lockdown restrictions amidst the implementation of the Enhanced community quarantine status in Luzon in March 2020. Months later, he was named as the commander of the Coast Guard Education and Training Command, where he implemented measures towards the modernization of the Coast Guard's identity. In 2021, Abu was named as the commander of the Maritime Safety Services Command, where he was instrumental for the enhancement of maritime safety throughout the Philippine Seas. On February 28, 2022, Abu was named as the new Commandant of the Philippine Coast Guard, replacing Vice Admiral Eduardo D. Fabricante, who served as the Officer-in-Charge of the PCG. Abu took his oath as commandant the following day, on March 1, 2022, and was promoted to the rank of admiral on March 11, 2022.

He officially retired on October 19, 2023 when he reached the mandatory retirement age of 56.

== Personal life ==
Known by his peers as "Art", Admiral Abu is married to Carlota Vergara, who lives at Luta Norte, in Malvar, Batangas, which is just north from his barangay in Luta Sur, and they have four children: Kevin Paul, Kariza Pamela, Kurt Patrick, and Karina Paula. He also loves singing and often plays his guitar on his free time. Abu also serves as a member of the organizations in the Freemasonry in the Philippines.
