= George V. Ursabia Jr. =

Filipino military officer

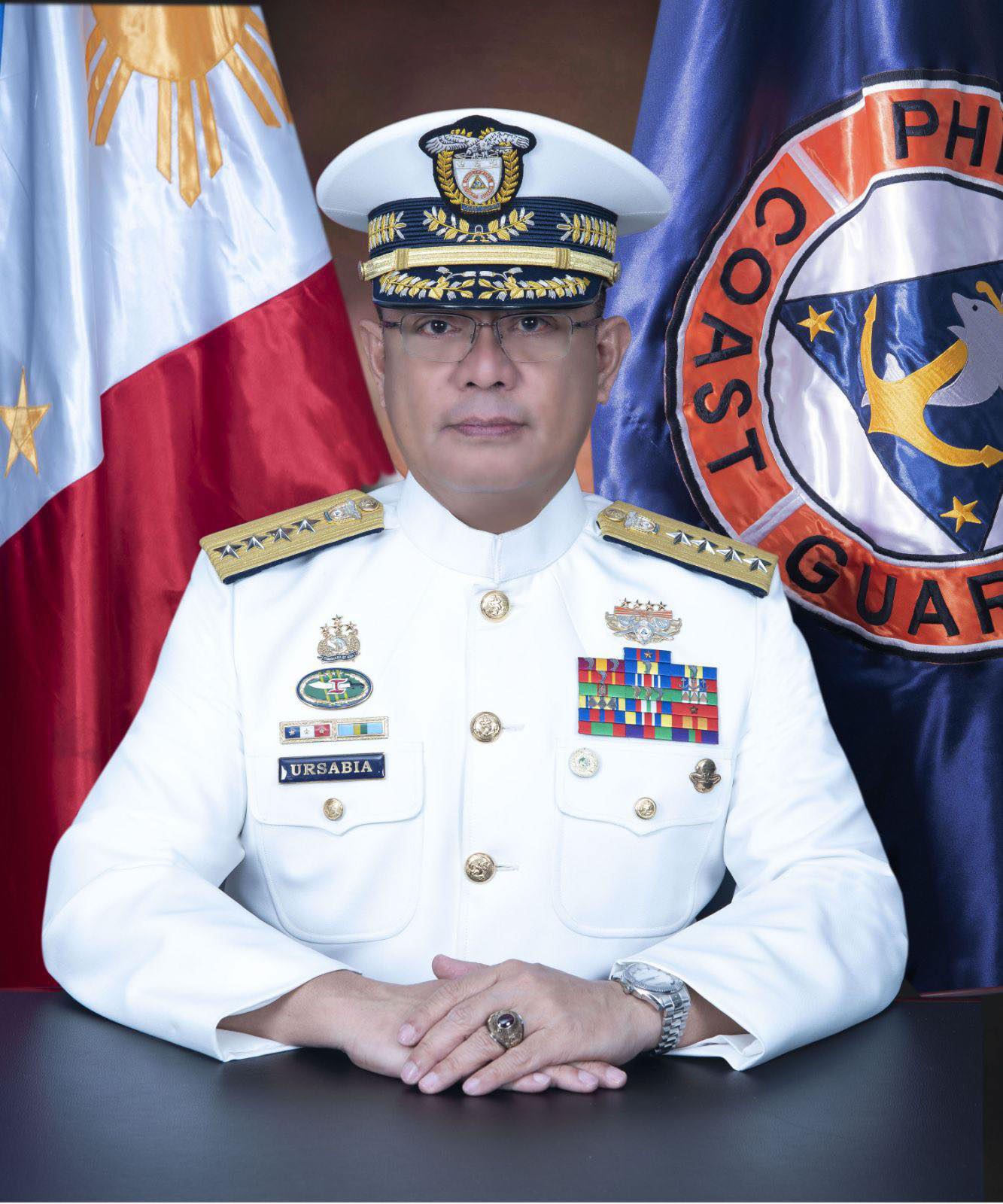
- Admiral George V. Ursabia Jr. as the Commandant of the Philippine Coast Guard

27th Commandant of the Philippine Coast Guard
- In office 1 June 2020 – 8 September 2021
- President: Rodrigo Duterte
- Preceded by: Admiral Joel S. Garcia
- Succeeded by: Admiral Leopoldo V. Laroya

Personal details
- Born: September 8, 1965 (age 61) Polomolok, South Cotabato, Philippines
- Education: Philippine Military Academy; World Maritime University (MSc, MSEP)

Military service
- Allegiance: Philippines
- Branch/service: Philippine Coast Guard
- Years of service: 1987–2021
- Rank: Admiral
- Unit: Commandant of the Philippine Coast Guard; Task Group Laban COVID-19 (Water Cluster); Coast Guard Marine Environmental Protection Command; Coast Guard District Central Visayas; Coast Guard Education and Training Command; Coast Guard District Palawan; Coast Guard District Southeastern Mindanao; Coast Guard District Northern Luzon; Coast Guard Ready Force; Coast Guard Station General Santos; Coast Guard Station Sarangani; BRP Corregidor (AE-891); BRP Davao del Norte (SARV 3504); BRP Romblon (SARV 3503); BRP Pampanga (SARV 003)

Admiral George Villareal Ursabia Jr. (born September 8, 1965) is a Filipino Admiral who served as the former Commandant of the Philippine Coast Guard. He is a member of the Philippine Military Academy "Hinirang" Class of 1987. Prior to his appointment, he served as commander of the Coast Guard Marine Environmental Protection Command, and the Task Group Laban COVID-19 (Water Cluster) under the Joint Task Force COVID Shield.

== Early life and education ==
He was born in Polomolok, South Cotabato, and finished his basic education with honors at the DOLE Philippines School in 1983, before entering the Philippine Military Academy and graduated as a member of the "Hinirang" Class of 1987. He also attended various courses locally and abroad, such as the Port State Control Officer's Course in Yokohama, Japan in 1995 and in 2002, the Comprehensive Crisis Management Course at the Asia-Pacific Center for Security Studies at Hawaii, United States in 2010, conventions from the International Maritime Organization, and other numerous courses, meetings and seminars. He earned his Master of Science Degree in Maritime Safety and Environmental Protection (MSc, MSEP) as a scholar at the World Maritime University in Malmö, Sweden, with the help of The Sasakawa Peace Foundation.

== Career ==
After graduating at the PMA in 1987, he commanded various ships from the Philippine Coast Guard, the Philippine Navy, and the Bureau of Fisheries and Aquatic Resources, such as the DA BFAR MCS-3008, DA BFAR MCS-3001, and the DA BFAR MCS-3002. He also served as a field station intelligence officer in Davao, Zamboanga, Cebu, and Manila. He also toured the BRP Besang Pass (AU-76), and the BRP Badjao (AE-59) and commanded the BRP Davao del Norte (SARV 3504), the BRP Romblon (SARV 3503), the BRP Pampanga (SARV 003), and the BRP Corregidor (AE-891), where he earned his Coast Guard Command-at-Sea Badge, after having 7 years of sea experience.

He also commanded two Coast Guard Stations, the Coast Guard Station General Santos and the Coast Guard Station Sarangani, and led Coast Guard Ready Force in September 2008 to September 2010, before commanding 4 Coast Guard Districts: the Coast Guard District Northern Luzon from October 2010 to February 2012, the Coast Guard District Southeastern Mindanao from March 2012 to January 2015, the Coast Guard District Palawan from January 2015 to March 2016, and the Coast Guard District Central Visayas.

From 2004 to 2006, he served as a staff member for the Deputy Chief of Coast Guard Staff for Maritime Safety Services, CG-8, where he contributed to the implementation of the International Ship Port Security (ISPS) Code, and became the Secretariat of the Liaison Office for Legislative Affairs (LOLA), where he led the passage of the “Coast Guard Law of 2009”, the new enabling law separating the Philippine Coast Guard from the Armed Forces of the Philippines in its maritime enforcement duties. In 2013, He was awarded the “Bakas Parangal ng Kadakilaan” by the Office of Civil Defense for his relief and rehabilitation efforts during the Typhoon Pablo, and led humanitarian efforts during the 2013 Bohol earthquake. He is also known as the Father of the Philippine Coast Guard's Coast Guard Officer's Course (CGOC) and the Coast Guardsman's Course (CGMC).

He also led the Coast Guard Marine Environmental Protection Command, and, under the outbreak of the COVID-19 pandemic, he led the Task Group Laban COVID-19 (Water Cluster), a combined task force of the AFP, the PNP and the PCG. On June 1, 2020, he took helm as the Commandant of the Philippine Coast Guard, replacing Admiral Joel Garcia after reaching the mandatory retirement age of 56. He was promoted to the rank of Admiral on July 31, 2020.

=== 2017 Graft Case Allegations ===
In July 2017, Then-Commander Ursabia was one of the 25 officials facing alleged graft cases, due to an anomalous P67.5 million procurement scandal on office supplies and information systems in 2014. The Ombudsman filed administrative and possible dismissal from service charges on the 25 officials. However, in September 2019, Ursabia, along with the other 24 officials were cleared from charges due to lack of evidence.

== Awards ==
- Philippine Republic Presidential Unit Citation
- People Power I Unit Citation
- 2 Coast Guard Legion of Honor (Degree of Maginoo)
- 4 Coast Guard Outstanding Achievement Medals
- 9 Distinguished Service Medals
- 1 Gawad sa Kaunlaran
- Meritorious Achievement Medals
- 2 Coast Guard Bronze Cross Medals
- 1 Bronze Cross Medal
- 15 Coast Guard Merit Medals
- 7 Military Merit Medals
- Military Commendation Medals
- 1 Military Civic Action Medal
- Long Service Medal
- Anti-dissidence Campaign Medal
- Luzon Anti-Dissidence Campaign Medal
- Visayas Anti-Dissidence Campaign Medal
- Mindanao Anti-Dissidence Campaign Medal
- Disaster Relief and Rehabilitation Operations Ribbon
- Coast Guard Auxiliary Disaster Relief and Rehabilitation Operations Medal
- Combat Commander's Badge
- Coast Guard Command-at-Sea Badge

== Personal life ==
He is married to Ms Agnes Chamos, a native from La Trinidad, Benguet, and they have two children, both licensed professionals.
