= Police watercraft =

Use of watercraft in police operations

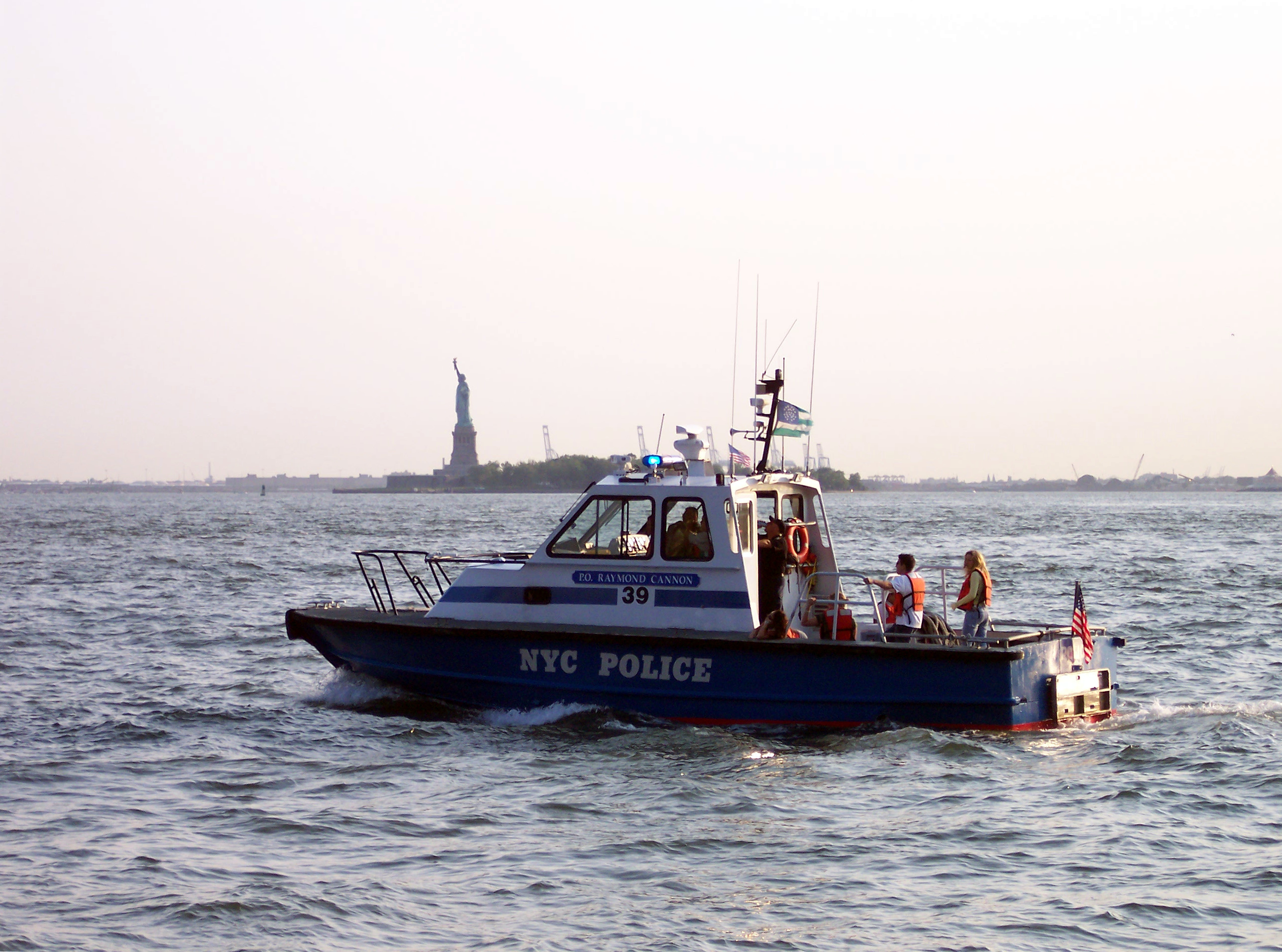
Police boat of the NYPD Harbor Unit in 2006

Police watercraft are boats or other vessels that are used by police agencies to patrol bodies of water. They are usually employed on major rivers, in enclosed harbors near cities or in places where a stronger presence than that offered by the harbormaster or coast guard is needed.

Police boats sometimes have high-performance engines in order to catch up with fleeing fugitives on the water. They have been used since the beginning of the 20th century.

== Types of police boats ==
- Patrol boat
- Motorboat
- Airboat
- Rigid-hulled inflatable boat

== Gallery of police boats ==
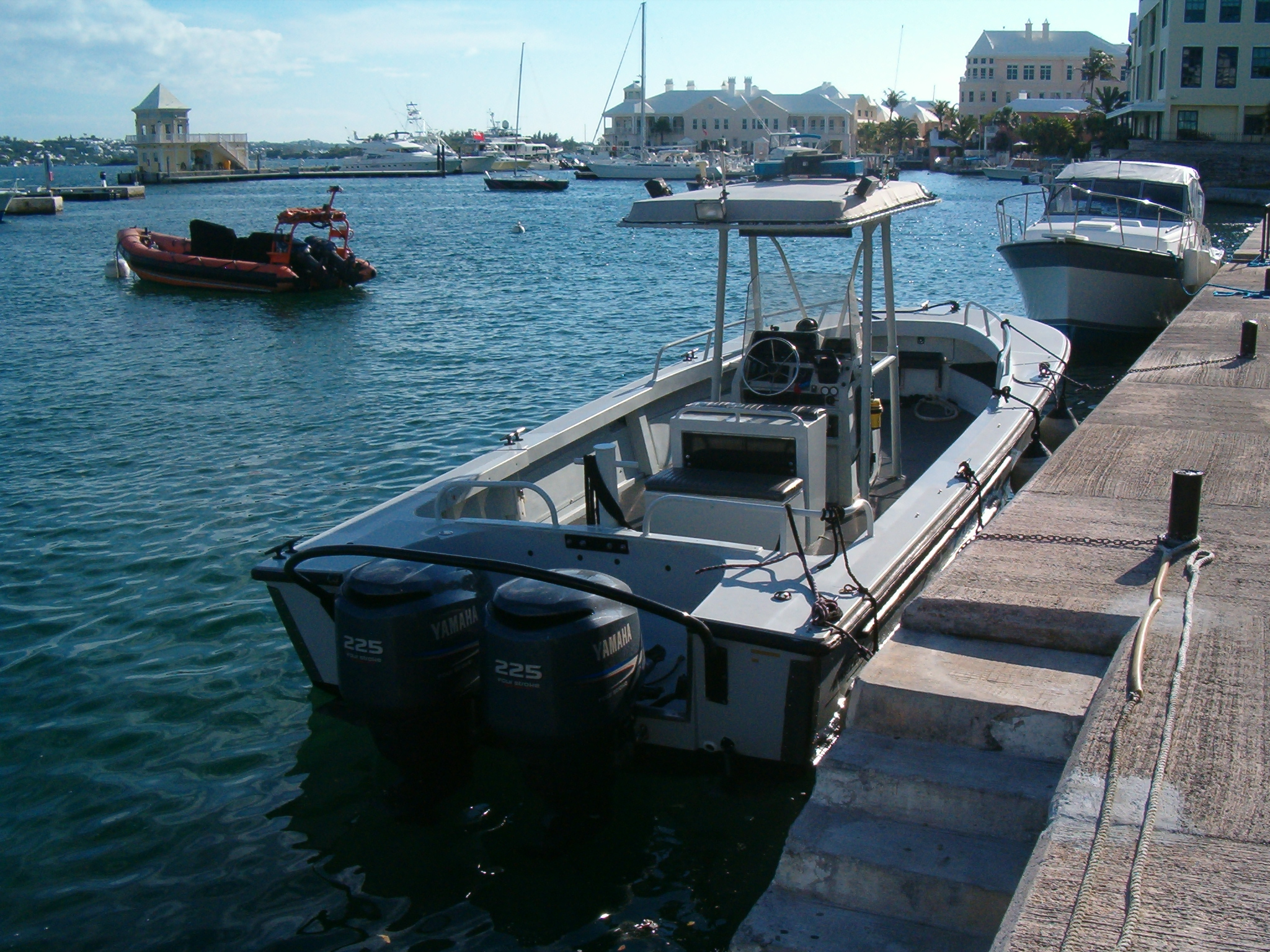
Boats of the Bermuda Police Service Marine Section at Barr's Bay

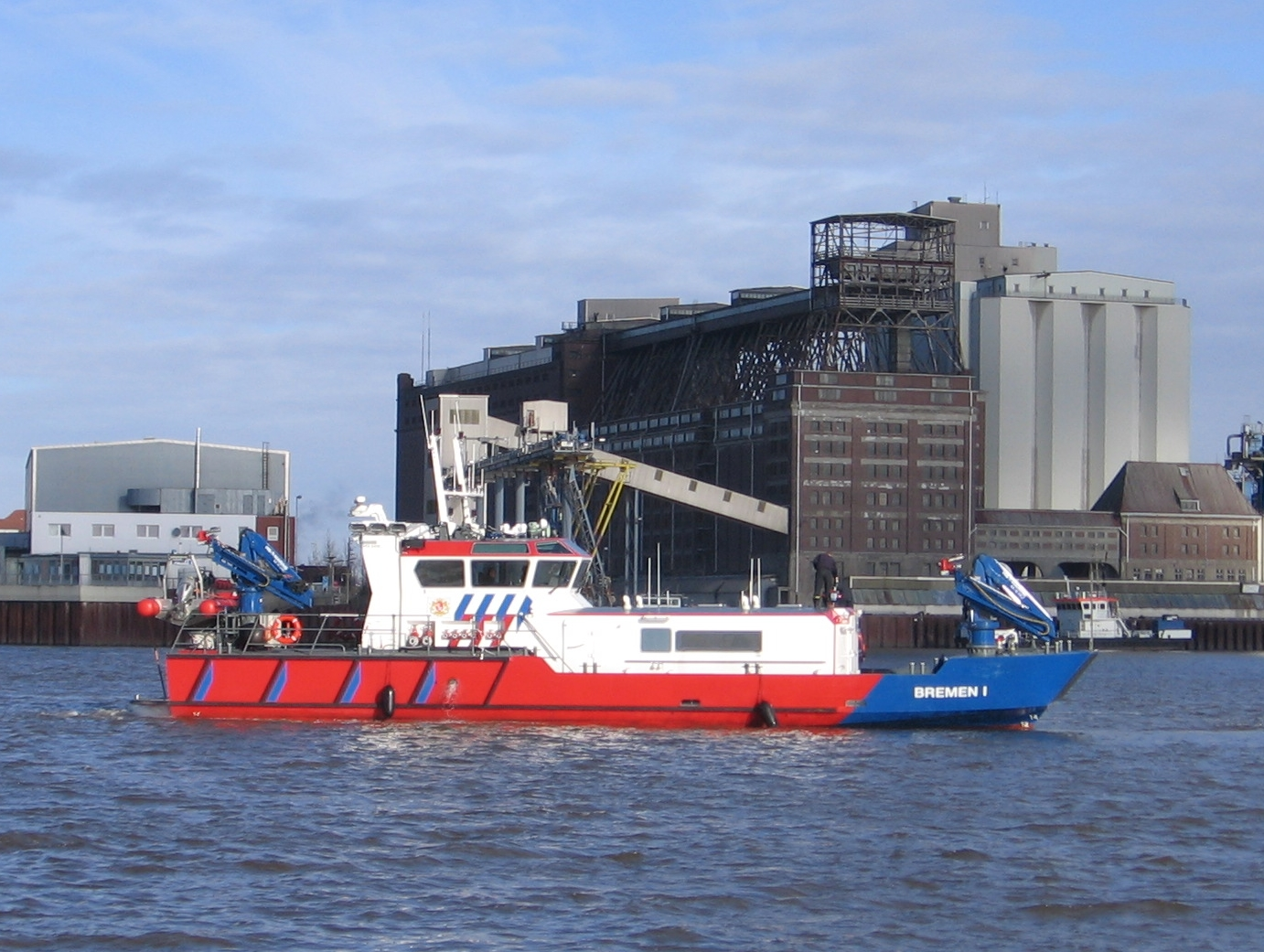
Combined police/fireboat in Bremen, Germany

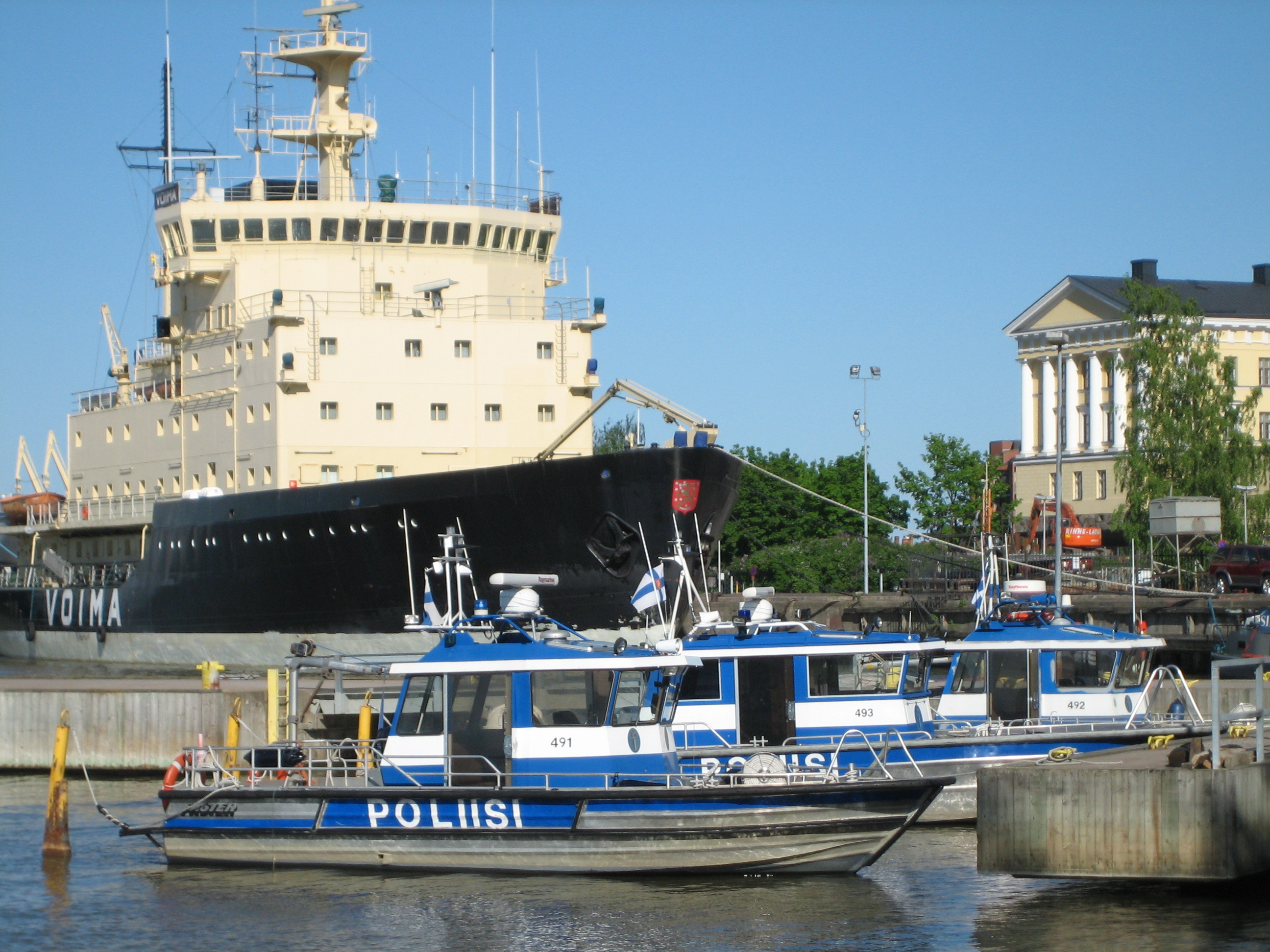
Police patrol boats in Helsinki, Finland

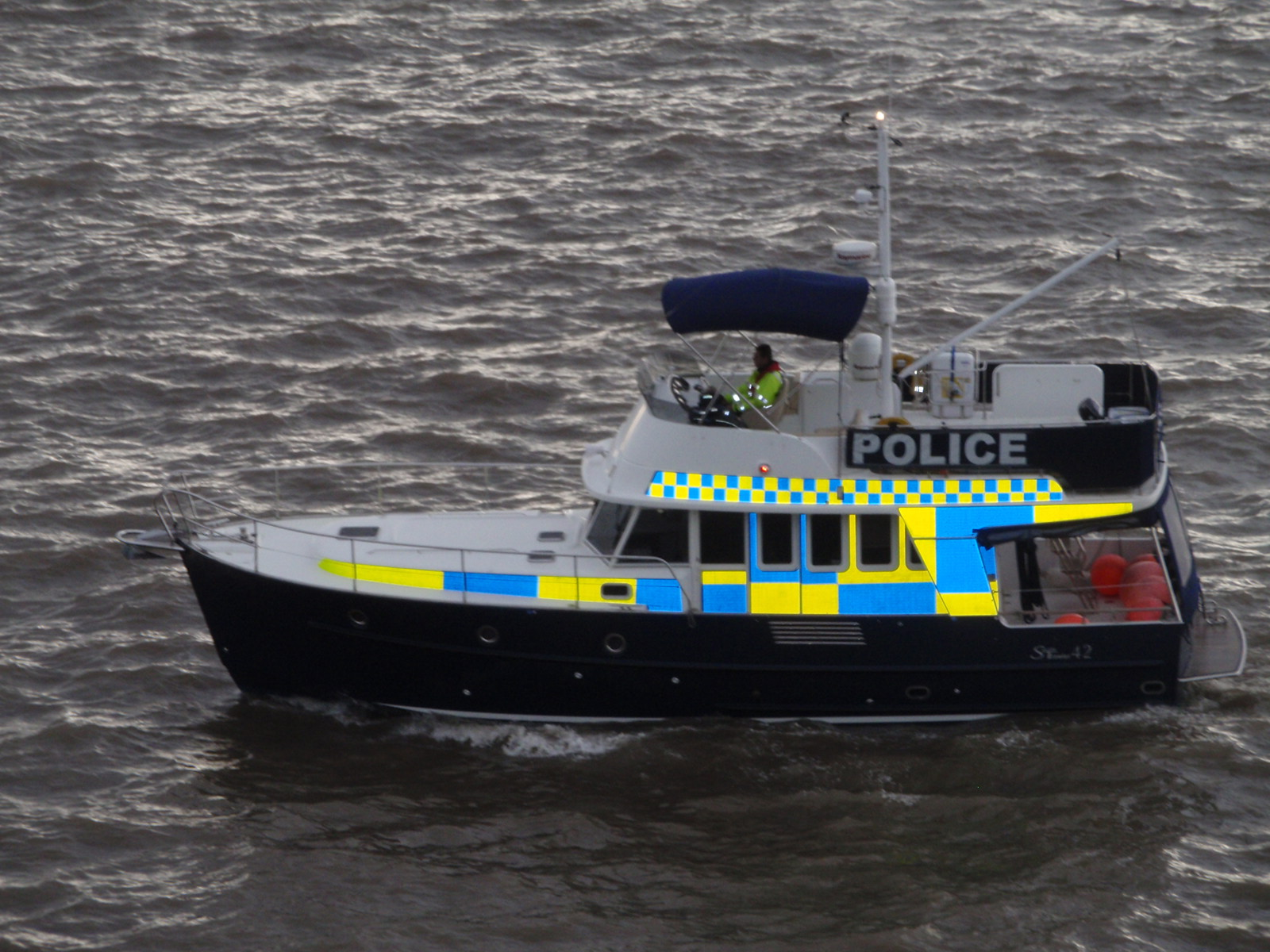
Police boat, Liverpool, England, October 2009

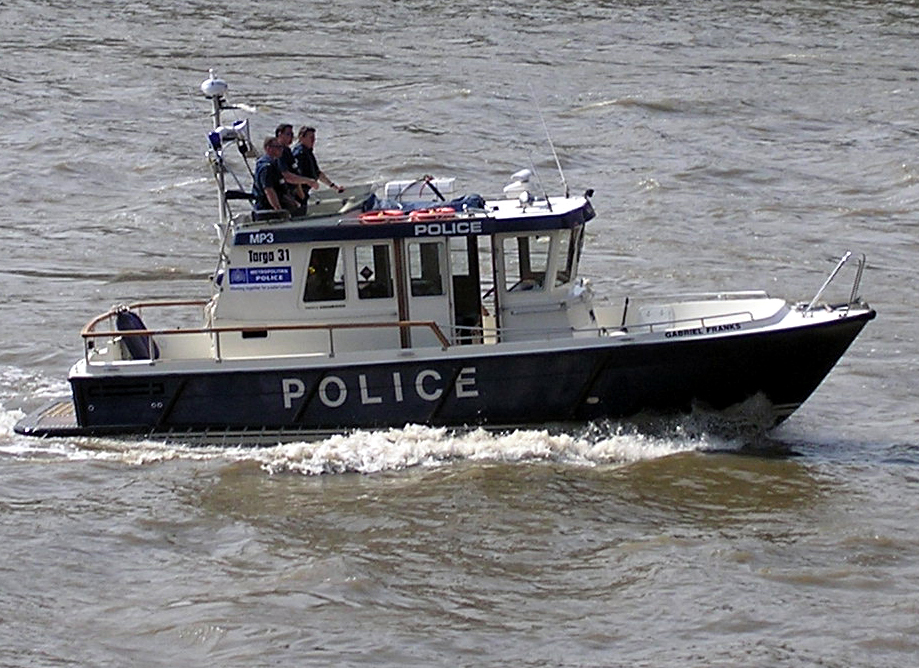
London Metropolitan Police boat Gabriel Franks on the Thames in 2005

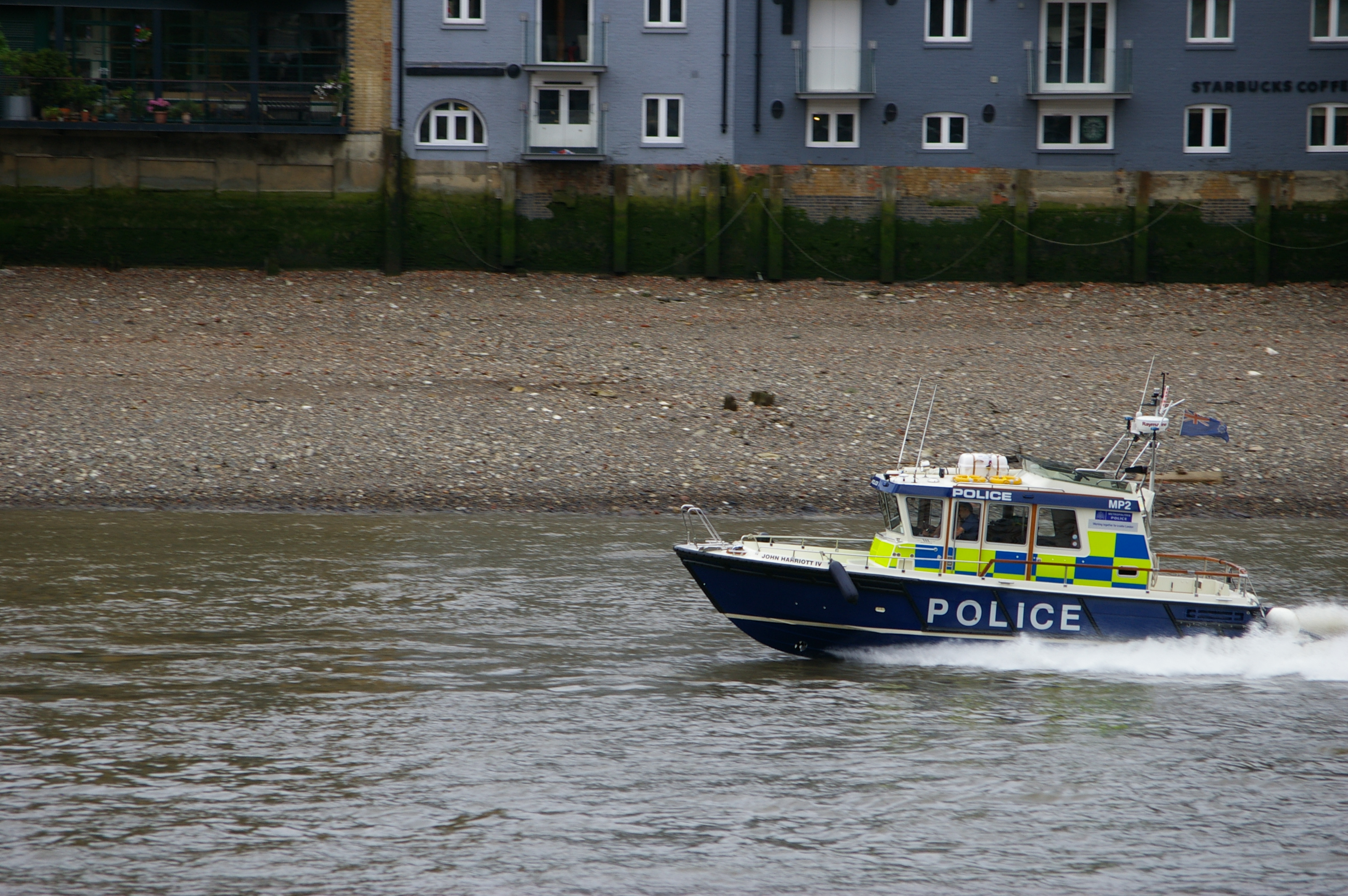
London Metropolitan Police boat John Harriott IV on the Thames

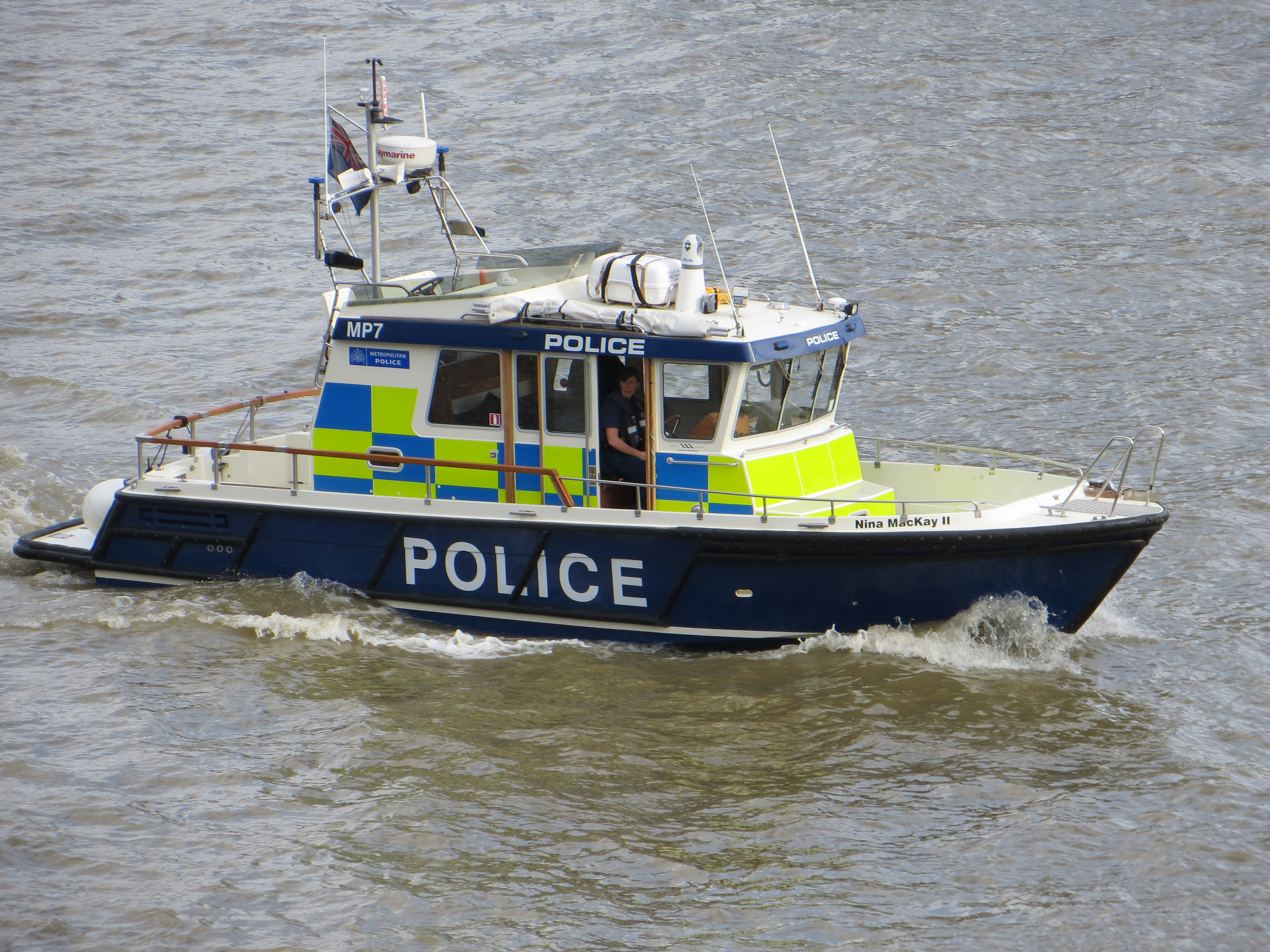
London Metropolitan Police boat Nina Mackay II on the Thames in 2013

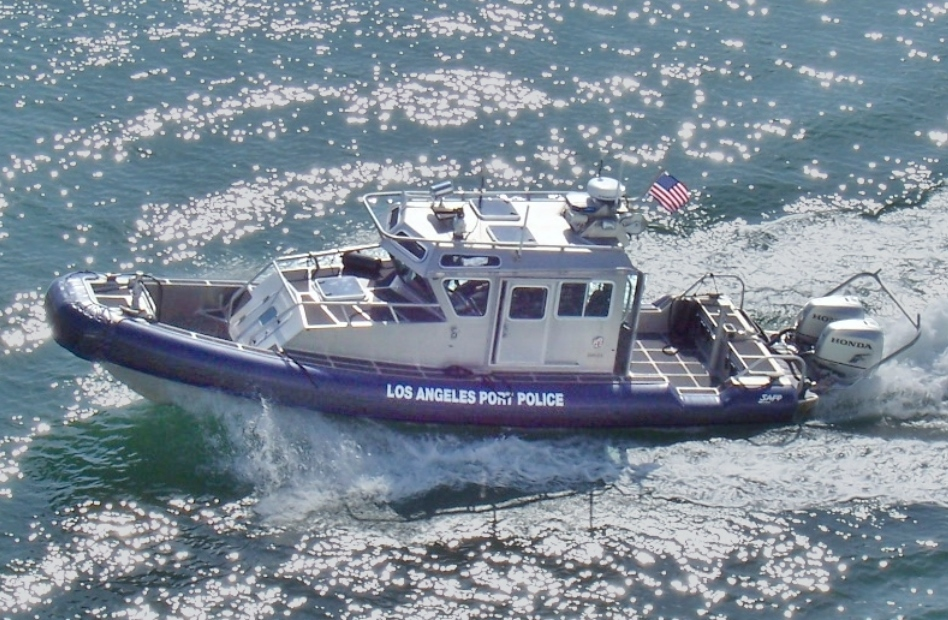
SAFE Boats 33' RIB of the Los Angeles Port Police

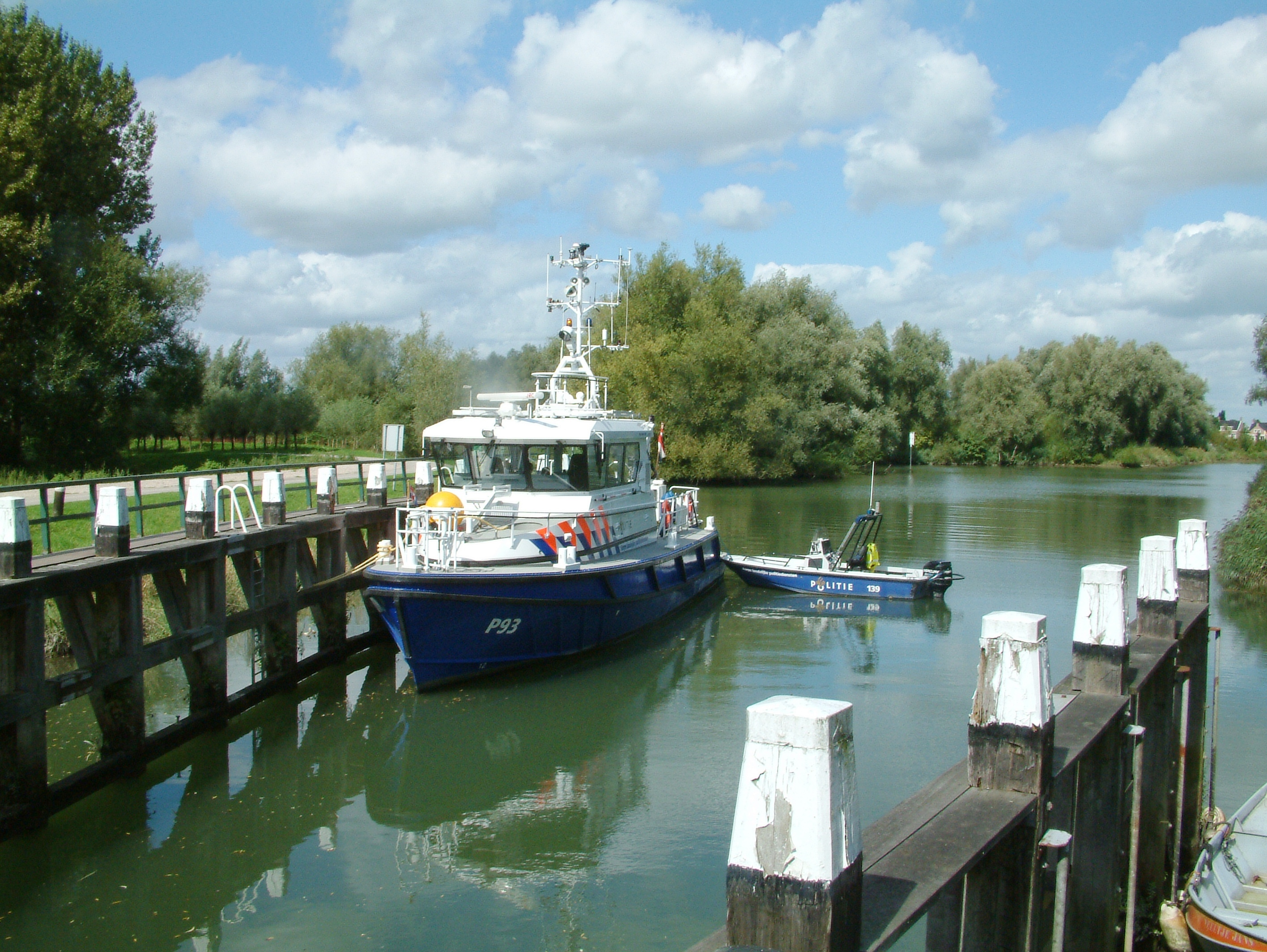
Netherlands Police boats in the Biesbosch in 2008

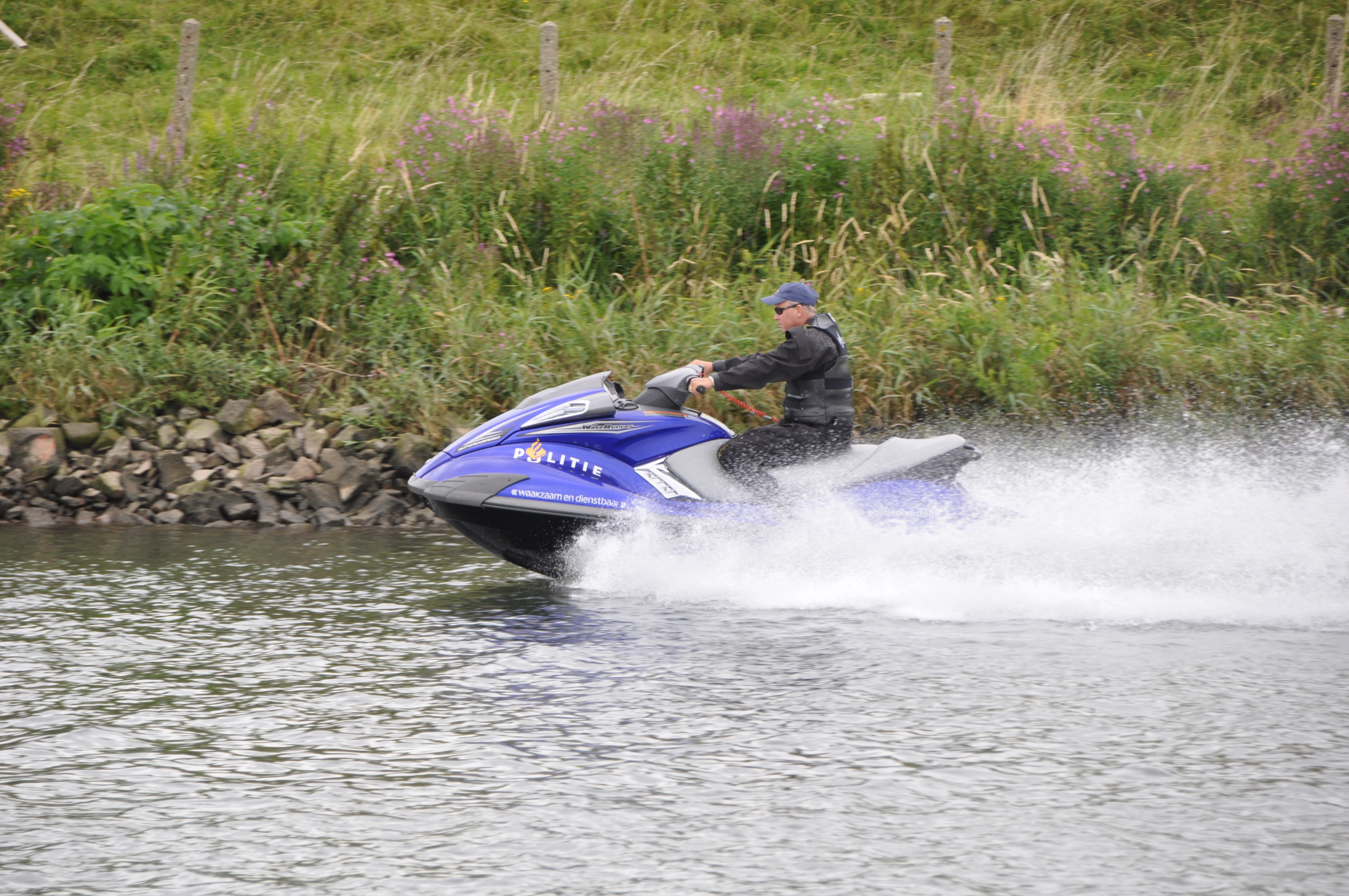
Netherlands Police jet ski on the Lek 2012.

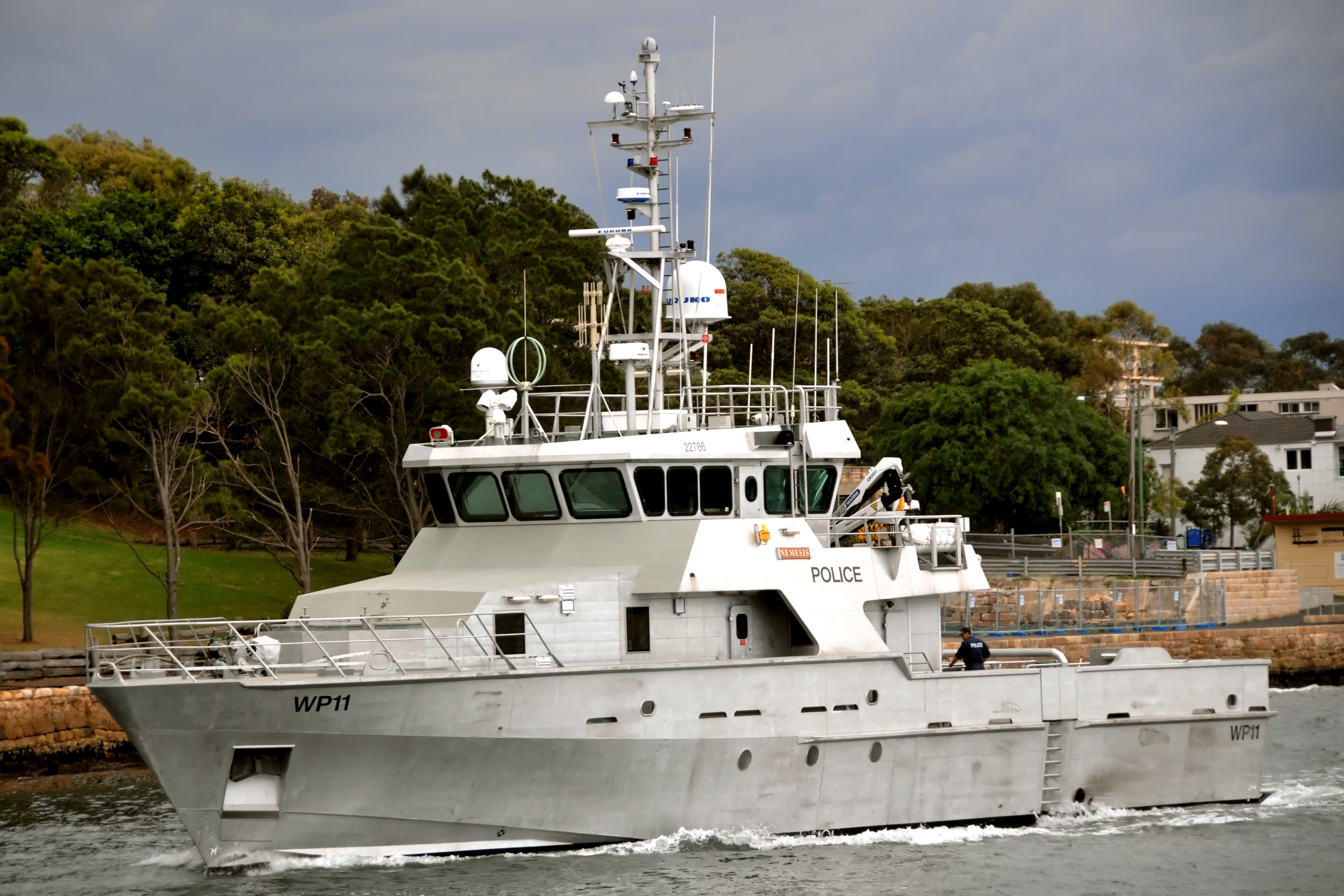
New South Wales Police Force vessel OPV Nemesis

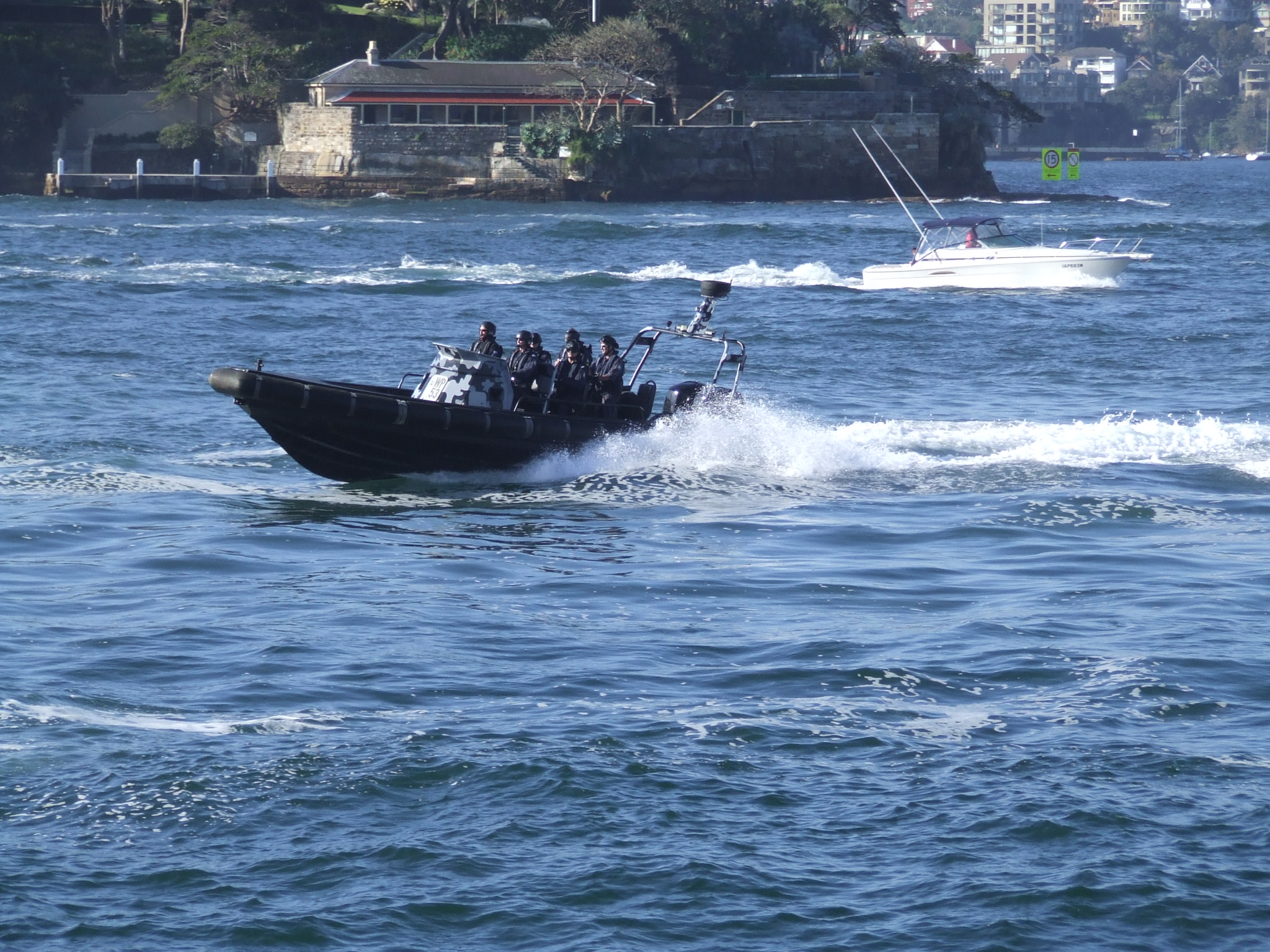
New South Wales Police Force boat patrolling Port Jackson.

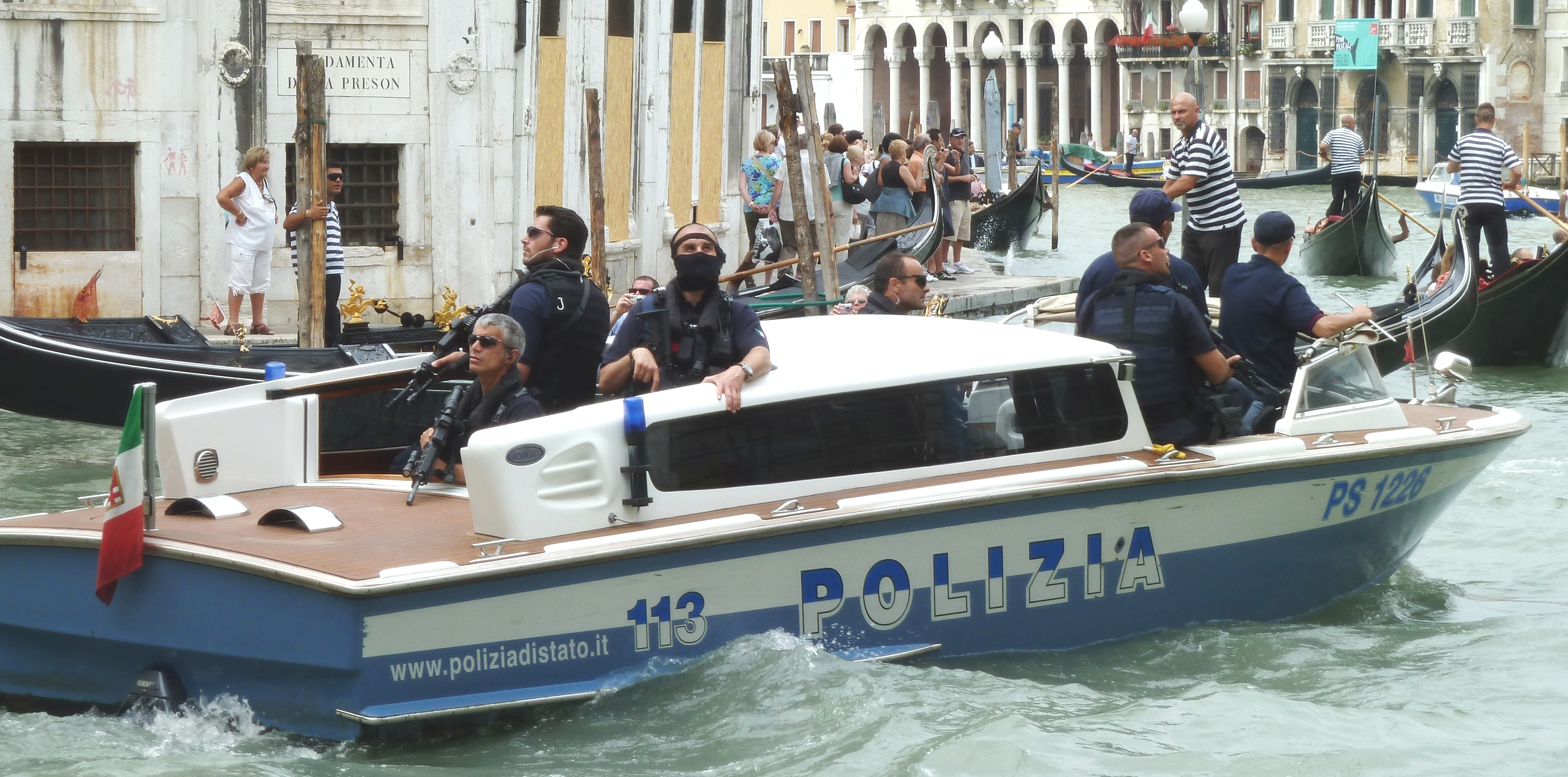
Anti terrorism Police boat in Venice

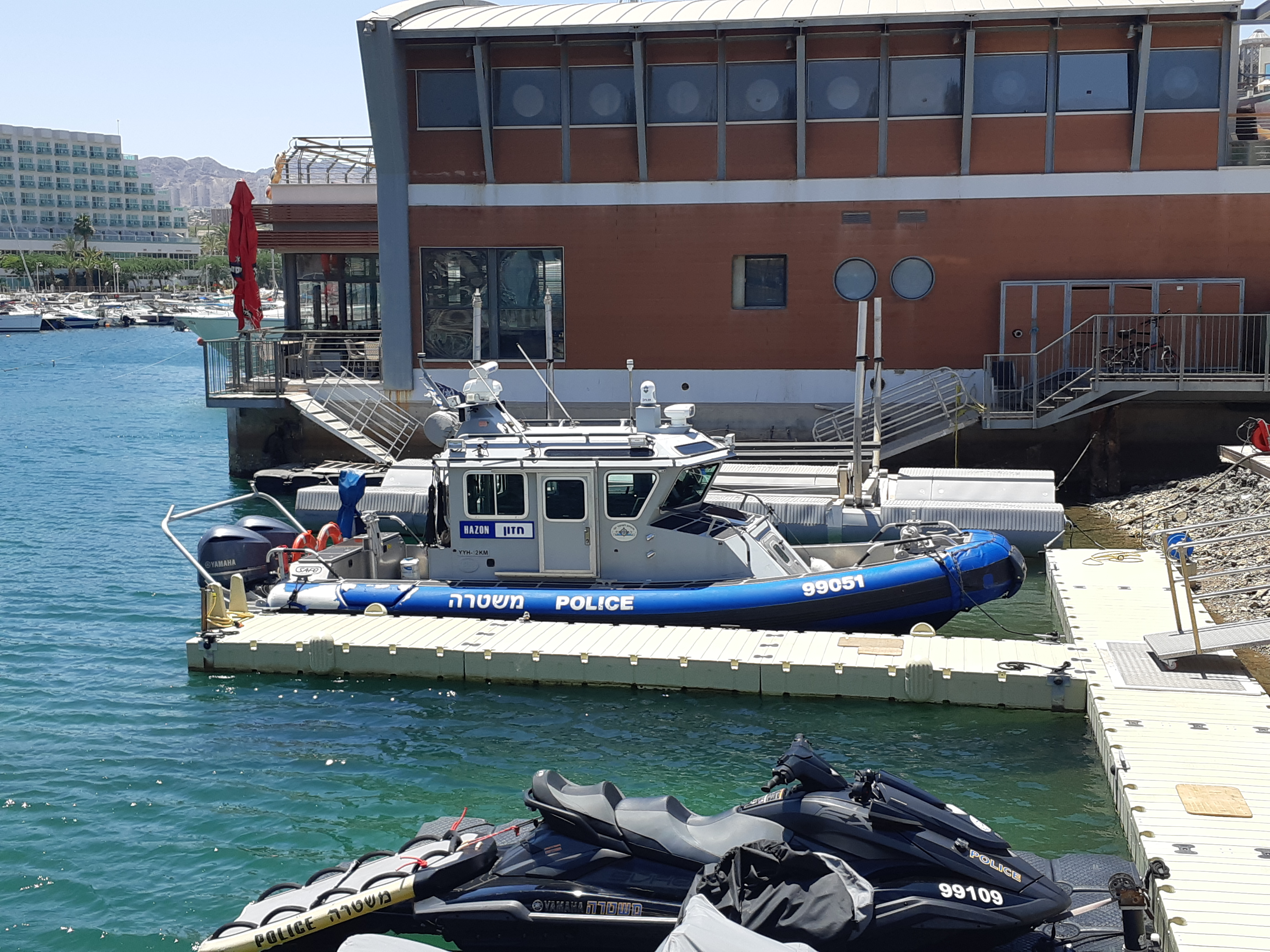
Israeli maritime police Defender-class boat Hazon and water scooter in Eilat Marina, Israel

== See also ==
- Coast guard
- Fire boat
- Harbourmaster
- Water police
