= Joel Sarsiban Garcia =

Philippine admiral

Joel Garcia

28th Commandant of the Philippine Coast Guard
- In office 24 October 2019 – 1 June 2020
- President: Rodrigo Duterte
- Preceded by: Elson E. Hermogino
- Succeeded by: George V. Ursabia, Jr.

Personal details
- Born: June 1, 1964 (age 62) Bago, Negros Occidental
- Education: Philippine Merchant Marine Academy (BS); World Maritime University (MS); Sulu State College (H.D., honoris causa); Eulogio "Amang" Rodriguez Institute of Science and Technology (PhD)

Military service
- Allegiance: Philippines
- Branch/service: Philippine Coast Guard
- Years of service: 1985–2020
- Rank: Admiral
- Unit: Commandant of the Philippine Coast Guard; Executive Director, National Coast Watch Center; Deputy Commandant for Administration of the Philippine Coast Guard; Coast Guard Marine Environmental Protection Command; Coast Guard Education and Training Command; Coast Guard Weapons, Communications, Electronics and Information Systems Command; Coast Guard District National Capital Region – Central Luzon; Coast Guard District Western Region; Coast Guard District Eastern Luzon Region; Coast Guard District Northern Luzon Region
- Battles/wars: Battle of Marawi

Admiral Joel Sarsiban Garcia is a Philippine Coast Guard admiral who has served as the 28th Commandant of the Philippine Coast Guard, who also has served as the executive director of the National Coast Watch Center (NCWC), and the deputy commandant for administration of the Philippine Coast Guard

== Early life and education ==
Admiral Garcia was born and raised in Bago, Negros Occidental, and finished his education at the University of Negros Occidental – Recoletos, before graduating the Philippine Merchant Marine Academy (PMMA) in 1985, and earned his Master of Science degree in maritime administration from the World Maritime University in Malmö, Sweden and Masters in Shipping Management at his alma mater, in the PMMA. He earned his Doctor of Philosophy (PhD) degree in public administration at the Eulogio "Amang" Rodriguez Institute of Science and Technology, conferred his doctor's degree in humanities (Honoris Causa) (H.D) at the Sulu State College, for his humanitarian services, and earned his license as a Master Mariner in 1992. He also earned the title Al-Haj for completing the Hajj. He also served as a professor in Maritime Administration and Environmental Economics in the PMMA Graduate School.

== Career ==
Admiral Garcia was assigned in various ships from the Philippine Navy, and the Philippine Coast Guard, wherein he also skippered various ships. He also served as the executive director of the Presidential Task Force on Maritime Development Secretariat in 1996 during the Presidency of Fidel Ramos, and served as the chairman of the Committee on Islamic Religious Studies and a member of the Technical Panels in Humanities and Maritime Education of the CHED from 2003 to 2010. Admiral Garcia served as Coast Guard District Commander on four districts: Coast Guard District National Capital Region – Central Luzon, Coast Guard District Western Region, Coast Guard District Eastern Luzon Region, and Coast Guard District Northern Luzon Region; and was also appointed on staff positions at the National Headquarters of the Philippine Coast Guard.

He was appointed as Officer-in-Charge of the Philippine Coast Guard from December 21, 2016, to December 15, 2018, after his predecessor, Rear Admiral William M. Melad, along with 24 other officials were suspended by the Ombudsman due to corruption charges. He also served as commander of the Coast Guard Weapons, Communications, Electronics and Information Systems Command, the Coast Guard Education and Training Command, and the Coast Guard Marine Environmental Protection Command.

He became the deputy commandant for administration of the Philippine Coast Guard, the second highest post in the coast guard, and at the same time, served as the executive director of the National Coast Watch Center, and the chairperson of the Regional Cooperation Agreement on Combating Piracy and Armed Robbery against Ships in Asia (ReCAAP) Governing Council, based in Singapore, before being appointed as the commandant of the Philippine Coast Guard on October 24, 2019.

== Awards ==
- Philippine Republic Presidential Unit Citation
- People Power I Unit Citation
- Coast Guard Legion of Honor (Degree of Maginoo)
- Officer, Philippine Legion of Honor
- Distinguished Service Medal
- 1 Gawad sa Kaunlaran
- Meritorious Achievement Medals
- 2 Coast Guard Bronze Cross Medals
- Bronze Cross Medal
- Coast Guard Merit Medals
- Military Merit Medals
- Military Commendation Medals
- 1 Military Civic Action Medal
- Long Service Medal
- Anti-dissidence Campaign Medal
- Luzon Anti-Dissidence Campaign Medal
- Visayas Anti-Dissidence Campaign Medal
- Mindanao Anti-Dissidence Campaign Medal
- Jolo and Sulu Campaign Medal
- Disaster Relief and Rehabilitation Operations Ribbon
- Combat Commander's Badge
- Coast Guard Command-at-Sea Badge
