= Ronnie Gil Gavan =

Filipino admiral

30th Commandant of the Philippine Coast Guard
- In office October 19, 2023 – October 19, 2026
- President: Bongbong Marcos
- Preceded by: Artemio Abu
- Succeeded by: Rommel A. Supangan

Personal details
- Born: February 21, 1969 (age 57) Maitum, Sarangani, Philippines
- Education: Philippine Military Academy (B.S); University of Wollongong (M.M.S)

Military service
- Branch/service: Philippine Coast Guard
- Years of service: 1993–2026
- Rank: Admiral
- Unit: Commandant of the Philippine Coast Guard; Deputy Commandant for Administration; Maritime Security and Law Enforcement Command; Task Force Kalinga; Task Force Pagsasanay; Coast Guard District Central Visayas

Ronnie Gil Latorilla Gavan is a Filipino admiral who served as the commandant of the Philippine Coast Guard from 19 October 2023 to 19 October 2026. Admiral Gavan is a graduate of the PMA Maalab Class of 1993 and his previous commands and posts include the deputy commandant for administration, and the Maritime Security and Law Enforcement Command.

== Early life and education ==
Gavan was born on 21 February 1969 in Barangay Mabai, Maitum, Sarangani. Both his parents work as public school teachers. Gavan graduated from the Philippine Military Academy (PMA) as part of the Maalab class of 1993. Gavan earned his Master of Maritime Studies by Research Degree, wherein his thesis focused on Philippine Maritime Border Security and the Law of the Sea at the Australian National Centre for Ocean Resources and Security, Faculty of Law, in the University of Wollongong in Wollongong, New South Wales, Australia. Gavan also completed the Executive Course on National Security at the National Defense College of the Philippines and the Leadership and Governance Course at the Harvard Kennedy School.

== Career ==
After his graduation in the PMA in 1993, Gavan briefly joined the Philippine Army before fully serving at the Philippine Coast Guard, where he was assigned under various Coast Guard and the Bureau of Fisheries and Aquatic Resources (BFAR) vessels, and later commanded the PCG and the BFAR capital ships. Gavan eventually became commanded of various Coast Guard Districts, which includes the Coast Guard District Central Visayas. Gavan also created various measures that aims to boost the coast guard's role within the country while intensifying its partnerships with other coast guards in the region, such as the creation of the Organized National Engagement at Sea Concept, also known as the ONE at Sea Concept, which is aimed to further boost the interoperability of the coast guard's role in helping the country’s military and law enforcement agencies in times of conflict; as well as the formulation of the Common Protocol on Engagements At-sea for Coast Guards and Maritime Law Enforcers or the C-PEACE initiative, which is aimed at boosting the coast guard's role in maintaining peace and promoting a rules-based order within the coast guards in the ASEAN region.

In the midst of the lockdown impositions during the COVID-19 pandemic in the country, Gavan led the first PCG unit in assisting the arrival of Overseas Filipino Workers (OFWs) and spearheaded the PCG's “Hatid Tulong Initiative” for the Locally Stranded Individuals (LSIs). During his term as commander of the Task Force Pagsasanay, which was launched on 6 April 2021, Gavan enhanced the Public-Private Partnership of the PCG on Humanitarian and Disaster Response Operations, as well as strengthened the branch's capacity building and preparedness in humanitarian missions, navigation skills, and maintenance operations. Gavan also eventually led the Task Force Kalinga, where he continued partnership initiatives with the private sector to boost the coast guard's transport capacity for the delivery of relief supplies to the victims of the Typhoon Rai, locally known as Typhoon Odette.

Gavan is also credited for the creation of the Angels of the Sea, an all-female radio operator team which boards on vessels deployed in the South China Sea by the PCG. The first batch of the Angels graduated in 2021. By February 2023, Gavan was promoted to the rank of vice admiral.

President Bongbong Marcos appointed Gavan as Commandant of the Philippine Coast Guard on October 19, 2023, succeeding Artemio Abu and was later promoted to admiral on the same day. He was selected from a shortlist of five people. As part of his initiatives as the Commandant of the Coast Guard, Gavan's leadership was centered on the core philosophy of “Chill but Prevail" mantra, and also spearheaded the Intensified Community assistance, Awareness, Response, and Enforcement, also known as the iCARE campaign plan, which aims to harmonize the coast guard's operations through intensified community engagement, and enhancing the maritime welfare of coastal communities.

In March 2024, Gavan was unanimously reelected as the chairperson for the ReCAAP ISC Governing Council, a position he held since 2023. Gavan's term in the council is set to expire on 30 May 2027. On February 18, 2025, Admiral Gavan is also the first admiral and commandant of the coast guard to secure a 3-year fixed term for the post after the signing of Republic Act No. 12122, which was immediately placed into effect and is set to serve his tenure until 19 October 2026.

== Awards and decorations from Coast Guard Service ==
- Grand Commander, Philippine Legion of Honor - For his "exeptional performance and dedicated service during his tenure as the Commandant of the Philippine Coast Guard
- 4 Coast Guard Distinguished Service Stars
- Coast Guard Distinguished Coast Guard Cross
- Coast Guard Outstanding Achievement Medal
- Coast Guard Superior Achievement Medal
- Coast Guard Bronze Cross Medal
- Coast Guard Silver Wing Medal
- Coast Guard Search and Rescue Medal
- Coast Guard Merit Medals
- Coast Guard Civic Action Medal
- Coast Guard Long Service Medal
- Coast Guard Anti-dissidence Campaign Medal
- Coast Guard Luzon Anti-Dissidence Campaign Medal
- Coast Guard Visayas Anti-Dissidence Campaign Medal
- Coast Guard Mindanao Anti-Dissidence Campaign Medal
- AFP Disaster Relief and Rehabilitation Operations Ribbon
- Coast Guard Command-at-Sea Badge
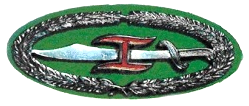
- Combat Commander's Kagitingan Badge

=== Other awards ===
- 2020 Philippine Military Academy Cavalier Awardee for Coast Guard Operations
- 2025 Philippine Military Academy Cavalier Awardee for Coast Guard Operations
- PMA Outstanding Achievement Award

=== Unit decorations ===
- Presidential Unit Citation
- Presidential Streamer Citation
- Meritorious Team Citation

=== Foreign Orders ===
- Officer, Ordre national du Mérite (French National Order of Merit) - For distinguished public service and contributions to strengthening maritime cooperation between the Philippines and France

== Personal life ==
Gavan is married to Commodore Lysamyra Marie Nonato-Gavan, who currently serves as the Chief Nurse of the PCG and they have two sons. Aside from Filipino and English, Gavan can also speak Cebuano, Ilocano, and Ilonggo. Gavan also formerly served as the president of the PCG Officers Club for 2020-2021.
