= OPV Nemesis =

Offshore patrol vessel of the New South Wales Police Force

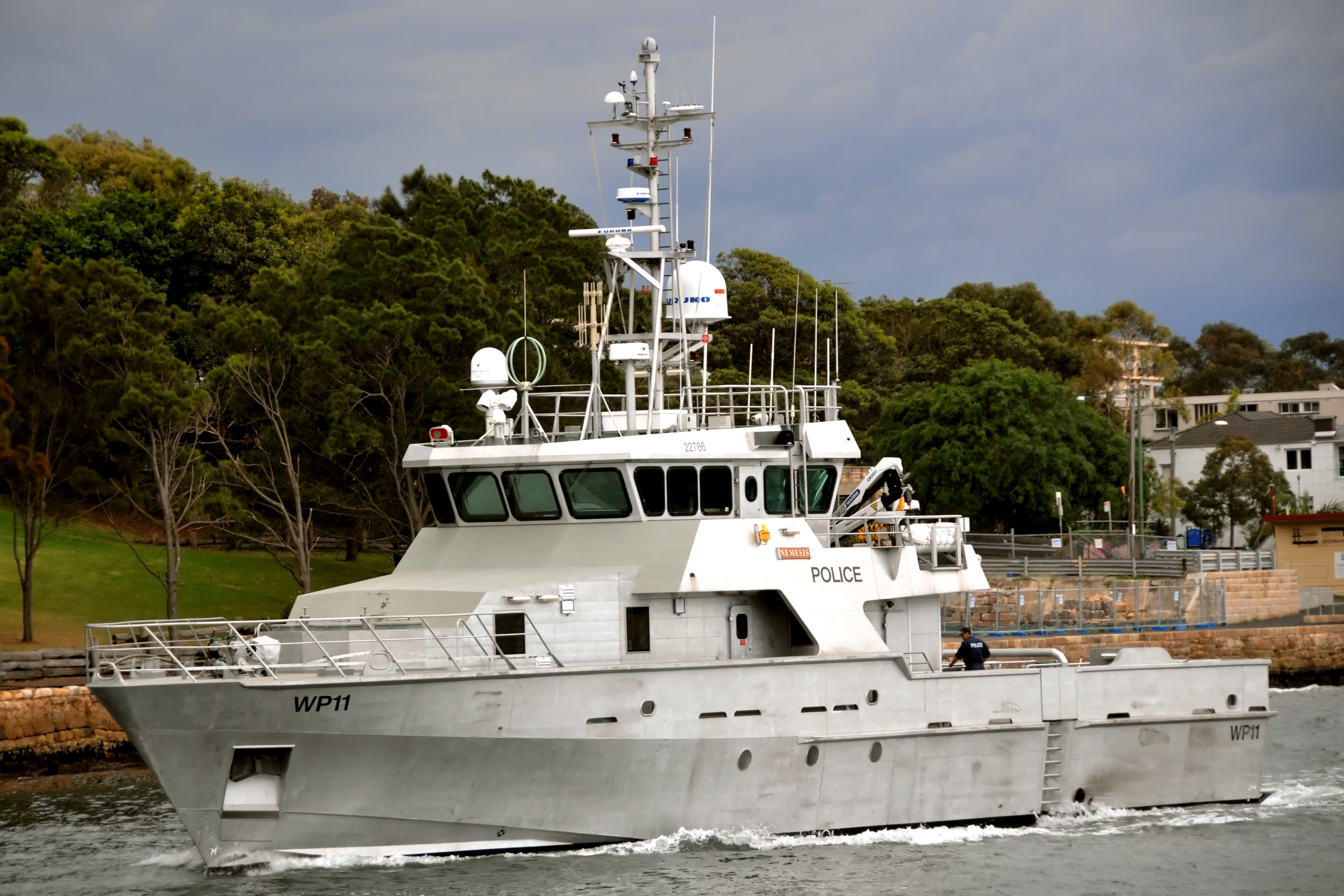
- OPV Nemesis on Sydney Harbour in 2009

History

Australia
- Name: OPV Nemesis
- Operator: New South Wales Police Force
- Builder: Tenix Defence, Henderson, Western Australia
- Acquired: June 2008
- Home port: Sydney
- Identification: IMO number: 9465875
- Status: Active as of 2024

General characteristics
- Displacement: 104 tonnes
- Length: 32 m (105 ft)
- Propulsion: 2 x 1,825 hp (1,361 kW) Caterpillar 12V C32 ACERT diesel
- Speed: 27 knots (50 km/h; 31 mph)
- Range: 1,400 nautical miles (2,600 km; 1,600 mi)
- Complement: Accommodation for up to 10
- Armament: Standard police issue firearms
- Notes: Carries 6.4 m (21 ft) rigid hull boarding craft

OPV Nemesis is an offshore patrol vessel of the New South Wales Police Force. It was purchased in 2008 to replace two older 22-metre vessels. It is designed to support a range of police operations up to 200 nautical miles (370 km; 230 mi) out to sea, including detecting illegal immigration, smuggling and drug trafficking and supporting counter terrorism and search and rescue missions.

The design specifications for the ship were drawn in 2005, taking into account lessons from the Pong Su incident. Nemesis was built by Tenix Defence in Henderson, Western Australia based on the 35-metre (115 ft) Ilocos Norte-class ships built by Tenix for the Philippine Coast Guard. At the time of its construction, Nemesis was the largest purpose-built police boat in the Southern Hemisphere.

The vessel is also used to assist the Australian Fisheries Management Authority and the Australian Border Force.

Officers on board carry firearms and the vessel itself is able to be fitted with mounted weapons.

Nemesis was part of the support patrol for the 2009 Sydney to Hobart Yacht Race.

In 2010, the NSW Police was criticised for only operating the ship for 403 hours in 2009. Deployments were subsequently increased to 80 hours per month.
