= Ilocos Norte-class patrol boat =

Philippine Coast Guard ship class

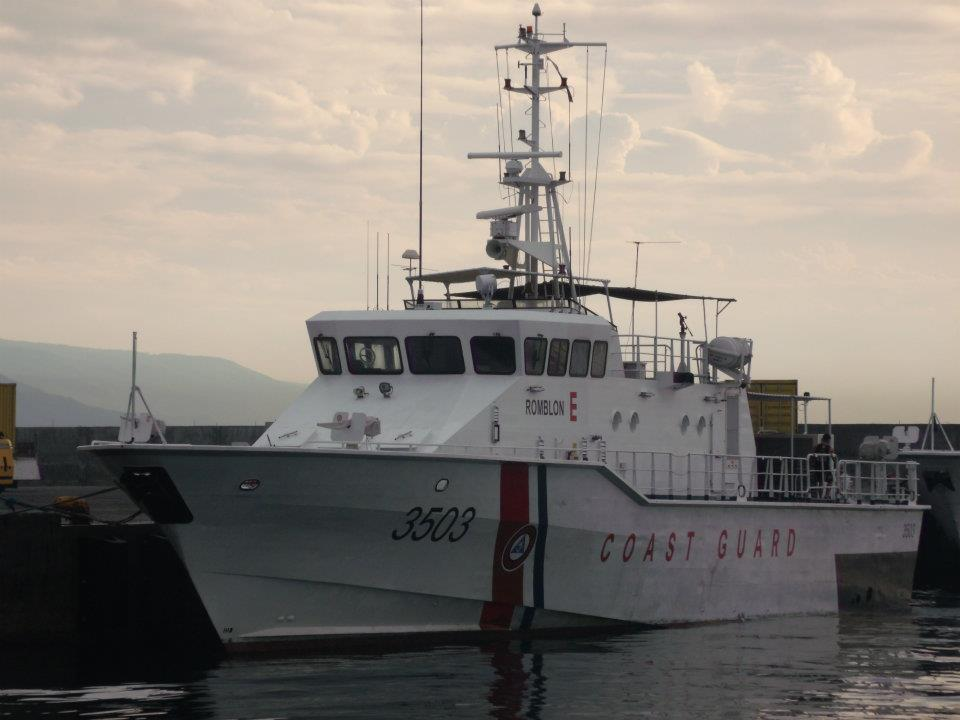
- BRP Romblon (SARV-3503)

Class overview
- Builders: Tenix Shipbuilding, Australia
- Operators: Philippine Coast Guard
- Completed: 4
- Active: 4

General characteristics
- Type: Patrol Boat (WPB)
- Displacement: 120 tons
- Length: 36.2 metres (119 ft)
- Beam: 6.7 metres (22 ft)
- Draught: 3.9 metres (13 ft)
- Propulsion: 2 x 35008D Caterpillar engines rated at 1044KW at 1800RPM, 2 shafts, 1 waterjet, fixed pitch propellers
- Speed: 25 knots (46 km/h; 29 mph)
- Range: 800 nautical miles (1,500 km; 920 mi) at 21 knots (39 km/h; 24 mph); 2,000 nautical miles (3,700 km; 2,300 mi) at 12 knots (22 km/h; 14 mph)
- Complement: 4 Officers + 16 Ratings
- Sensors & processing systems: Furuno navigational radar
- Armament: 4 x M2 Browning

The Ilocos Norte-class patrol boat is a series of four vessels in active service of the Philippine Coast Guard. Their hull number prefix "SARV" means they are classified as "search and rescue vessels". Currently Non operational.

== Design and construction ==
The Ilocos Norte class is a 35-metre (115 ft), all-aluminium patrol boat designed by Tenix Shipbuilding in Australia, based on the company's Pacific-class patrol boat. Four vessels were delivered to the Philippine Coast Guard in December 2001. An option for a follow on order of ten more ships was offered by Tenix, but not used by the Philippine Coast Guard.

Tenix reused the Ilocos Norte design in 2008 for the New South Wales Police Force patrol vessel Nemesis; the largest police-operated patrol boat in the Southern Hermisphere.

== Operational history ==
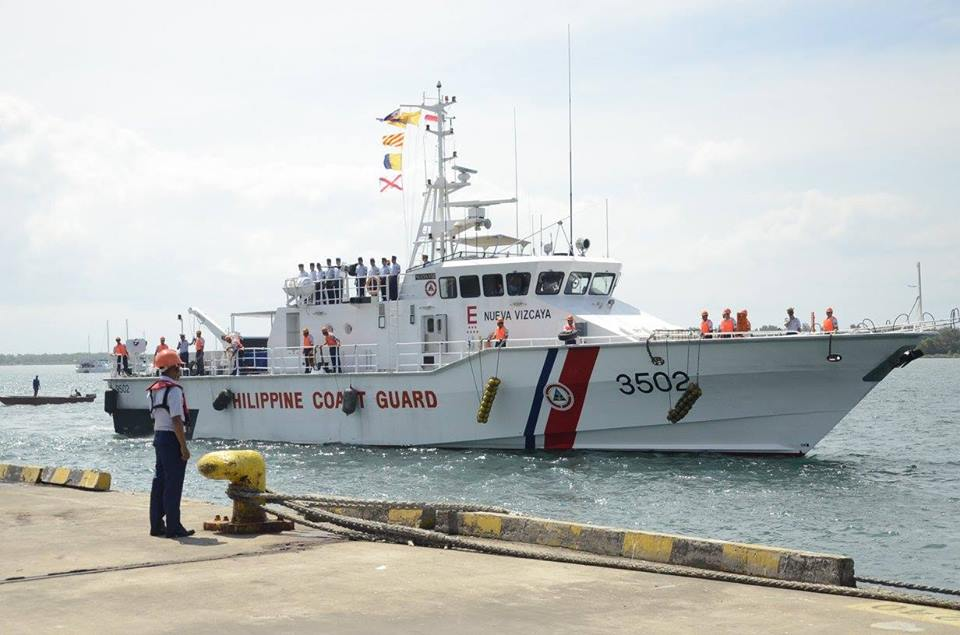
The BRP Nueva Vizcaya (SARV 3502).

On December 24, 2009, BRP Nueva Vizcaya (SARV 3502), along with BRP Pampanga (SARV 003)and MT Tug Habaga (TB-271), was deployed to Cavite to conduct search and rescue operations when MV 'Catalyn B, a wooden hull motorized vessel collided with the fishing vessel FV Anatalia and sank 2.8 nautical miles (5.2 km; 3.2 mi) northwest of Limbones Island at 2:25 a.m. Thursday.

On April 8, 2013, BRP Romblon (SARV 3503) was deployed when a Chinese fishing vessel ran aground in Tubbataha Reef. Romblon assisted with removing the ship's cargo and fuel.

Publicly available Automated Identification System (AIS) tracking data shows that only one of the vessels, BRP Romblon, has left its home port in the year 2024.

== Ships in class ==
| Hull number | Name | Builder | Commissioned | Status |
|---|---|---|---|---|
| SARV-3501 | BRP Ilocos Norte | Tenix Shipbuilding | May 2003 | Active |
| SARV-3502 | BRP Nueva Vizcaya | Tenix Shipbuilding | 2003 | Active |
| SARV-3503 | BRP Romblon | Tenix Shipbuilding | November 2003 | Active |
| SARV-3504 | BRP Davao del Norte | Tenix Shipbuilding | February 12, 2004 | Active |

== Gallery ==
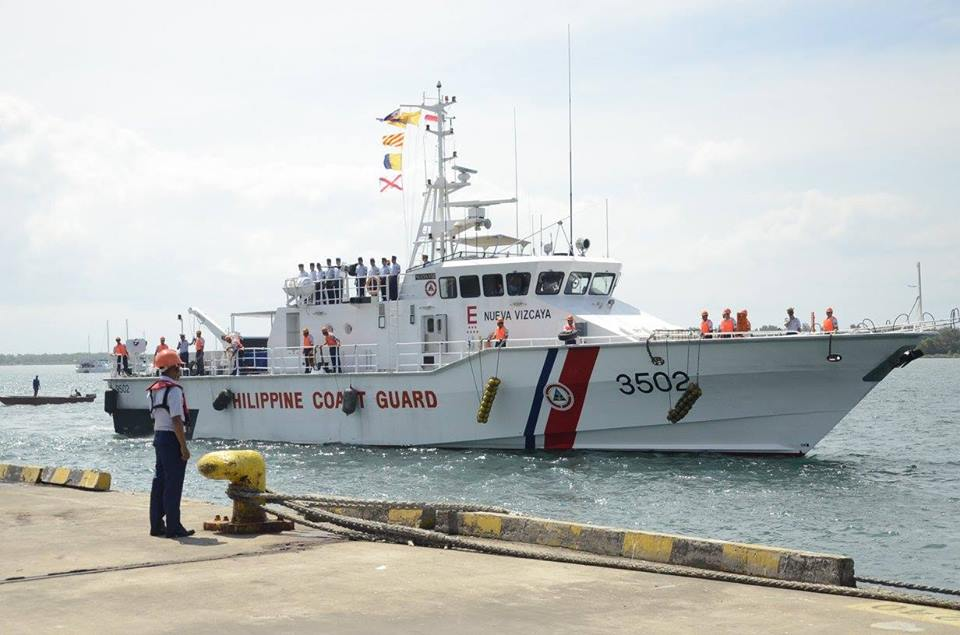
(SARV-3502) BRP Nueva Vizcaya

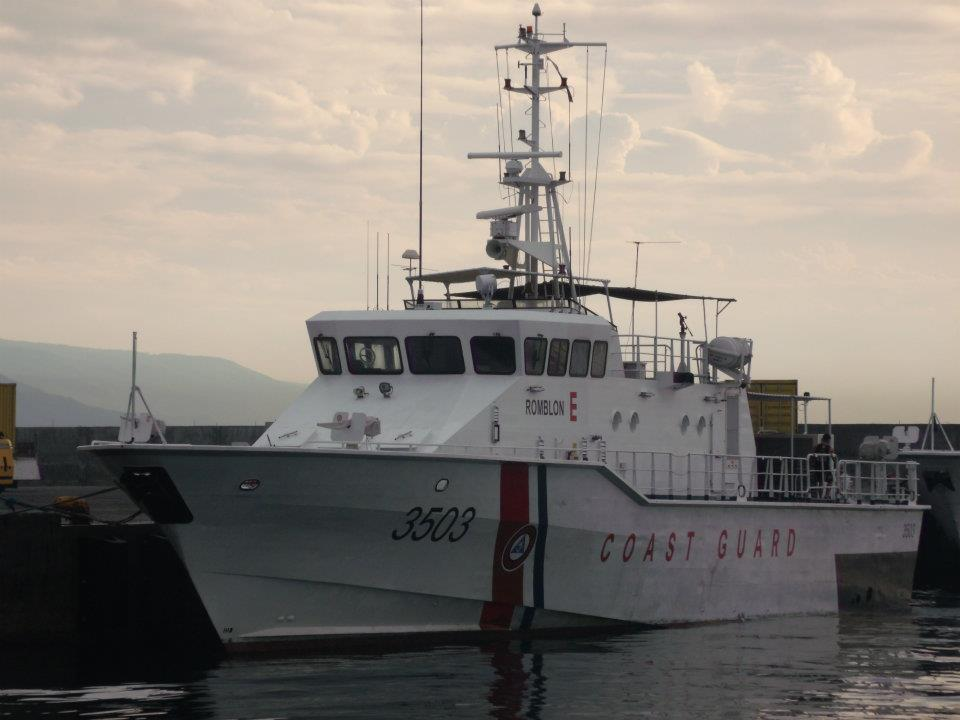
(SARV-3503) BRP Romblon

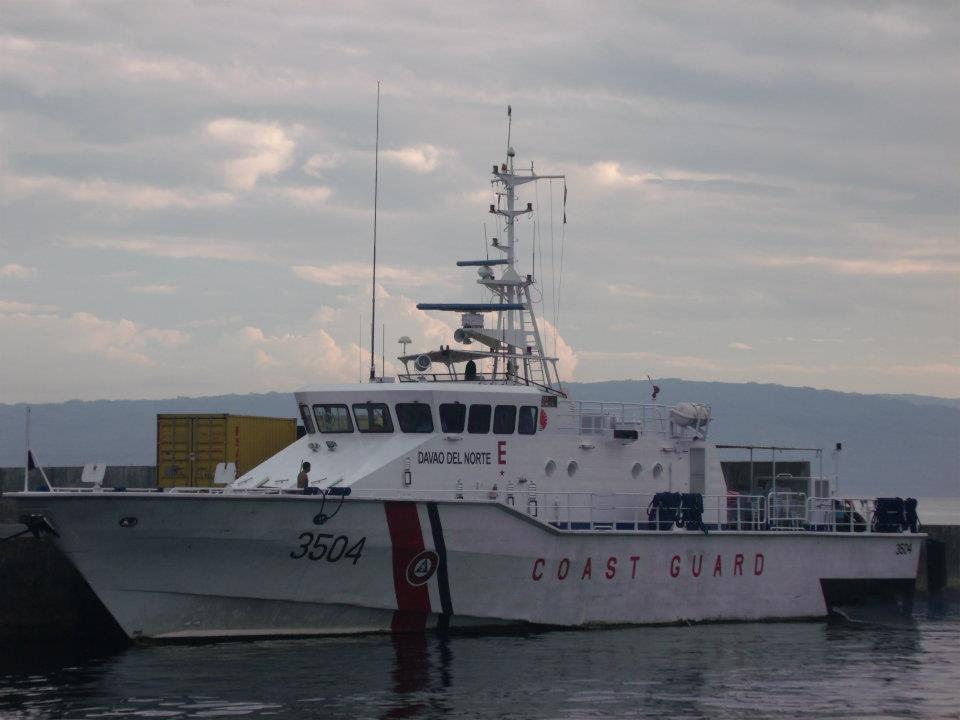
(SARV-3504) BRP Davao Del Norte
