= San Juan-class patrol vessel =

Class of four Philippine patrol vessels

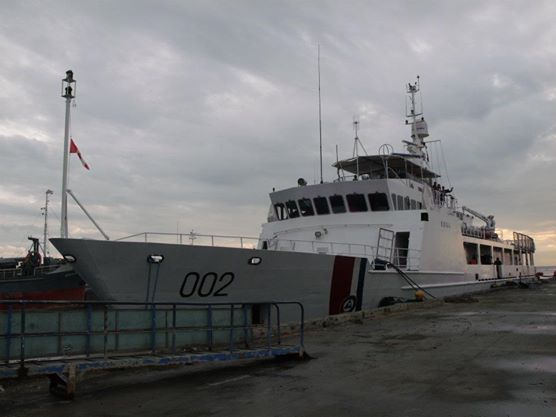
- BRP EDSA II (SARV-002)

Class overview
- Builders: Tenix Shipbuilding, Australia
- Operators: Philippine Coast Guard
- Planned: 4
- Completed: 4
- Active: 4

General characteristics
- Type: Patrol vessel (WPB)
- Displacement: 540 tons standard
- Length: 56 m (184 ft)
- Beam: 10.55 m (35 ft)
- Draught: 2.5 m (8 ft 2 in)
- Propulsion: 2 × Caterpillar 3612 Engines Rated 4060 bkW (5440 hp) @ 1000 rpm; 2 × Caterpillar 3406TA Generators rated 260 eKW @ 1800 rpm; 1 × Caterpillar 3306TA Harbor Generator rated 170 ekW @1800 rpm
- Speed: 26 knots (48 km/h) maximum
- Range: 1,000 nautical miles (1,900 km) @ 24 knots, 2,000 nautical miles (3,700 km) @ 15 knots
- Complement: 13 Officers and 24 Ratings + 300 Transient (evacuation limit)
- Sensors & processing systems: Furuno X-band and S-band navigational radars
- Armament: 2 x M2 Browning
- Armor: steel hull with aluminum superstructure
- Aviation facilities: helipad at aft deck

The San Juan-class patrol vessel consists of four vessels built by the Australian shipbuilding company Tenix for the Philippine Coast Guard. They were commissioned from 2000 to 2003. Their hull number prefix "SARV" means they are classified by the coast guard as "search and rescue vessels". They specialize in and are designed for search and rescue and other maritime emergencies. It is reported that the ships have fallen into disrepair. Currently non-operational.

== Technical details and structure ==
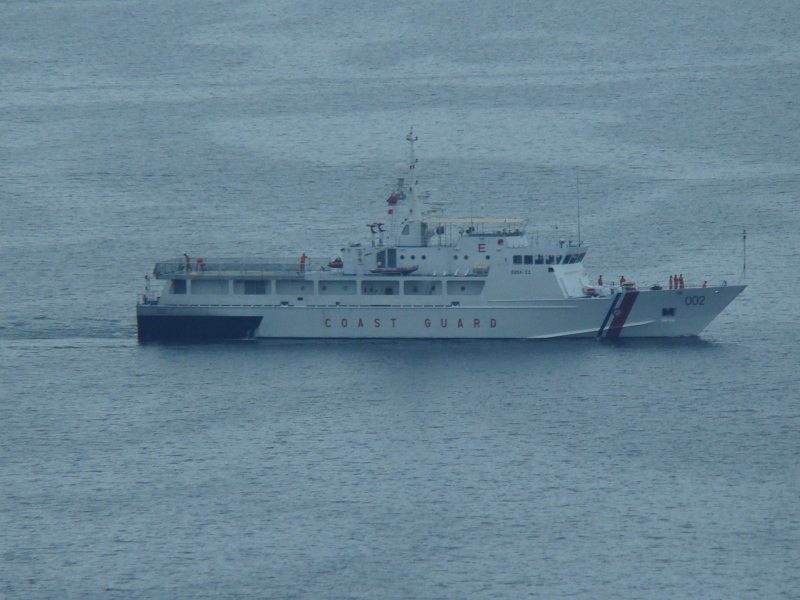
BRP EDSA II returning to port

The San Juan-class were built brand-new. Designed to be a purpose-built Maritime Emergency vessel with the capabilities to support recovery and evacuation of survivors at sea, including jackstay transfer, provide emergency medical operating facilities, helicopter operations including deck refueling, maritime pollution control and containment, alongside firefighting facilities for adjacent ships and decompression and diving facilities. The San Juan class was designed in accordance to Det Norske Veritas (DNV) Classification "Rules for Classification of High Speed and Light craft" with notation 1A1 HSLC Crew R1. The following International Convention, Regulations and Standards were also applicable to the vessel: International Civil Aviation Organization (ICAO), International Convention for the Safety of Life at Sea (SOLAS) 1997 Consolidated Edition, International Load Line Convention 1966, International Tonnage Convention 1969, International Convention for the Prevention of Pollution from Ships (MARPOL 73/78 Annex. I (Oil) & IV (Sewage) with Amendments, Regulations of the Flag State, Philippine Department of Transportation and Communication (DOTC). Alongside firefighting capability is provided by a main reduction gearbox driven pump supplying two fire monitors mounted on the aft end of the bridge. Each monitor is capable of providing a seawater throw of 100 meters at a rate of 300 cubic meters per hour. These can be operated remotely from the bridge or via a wandering lead from the bridge wings. The operation permits one monitor to provide fog spray, to protect the vessel itself and the other providing a jet spray directed to the adjacent vessel on fire.

The vessel is also equipped with four 25-person SOLAS inflatable rafts; six 65-person open reversible rafts; one 6.5 meter Rapid Intervention Boat with a speed in excess of 25 knots and an 85 nautical mile range, launched from the stern transom ramp; four 4.5 meter Rigid Hull Inflatable Boats are carried on the bridge deck and launched by an Elbeck crane; and one Twinlock Decompression chamber, consisting of two berth inner lock and medical outer lock. A separate survivor's area has been included in the vessel's arrangement, which provides for the decompression chamber, medical reception, operation theater and seating in an open plan arrangement. It takes a crew of 37: six officers, six petty officers, a medical officer that is also a hyperbaric specialist, two rescue divers, a corpsman and twenty-one ratings. Acquired through soft loans from Australia initiated in 1997, each ship originally cost A$19 million, reduced to A$16.7 million.

Hull form for the vessel was developed based on a semi displacement hard chine form, flared forward in combination of built in spray rail to further improve the vessel's performance and planing at high speeds. The hull was initially developed and designed by Tenix using hydrostatics software Maxsurf and later sent to the Maritime Research Institute (MARIN) for review, which confirmed the predicted performance of the vessel. Seakeeping features includes sustained speeds of 12 knots in Sea State 4. Hull is of all-welded construction with grade 250 steel with aluminum superstructure including flight deck. Stern door constructed of aluminum alloy to reduce weight. Main propulsion consists of two medium speed Caterpillar 3612, producing 4,060 bkW at 1,000 rpm mounted with a flexible coupling connecting the flywheel to a clutchable Reintjes LAF 3445 reduction gearbox, gearbox ratio 2.515:1. The gearbox is hard mounted with a horizontally offset output driving a shaft line connected to acbLips four-bladed (Hub 4D710D) controllable-pitch propeller. Each propulsion train and ancillary systems are capable of operating independently. Port reduction gearbox provides a power take-off connection for the fire monitor pump which are used alongside firefighting capability. Main engines and auxiliaries are fueled by 109,762 liters of diesel, sufficient for an operational range of 1,000 nm at speeds of 24 knots and 2,000 nm at speeds of 15 knots, both with 10% remaining fuel. Electrical power is supplied by two Caterpillar 3406 generators sets each provides 260 ekW located in the forward area of the engine room. The design allows for the complete electric power demand to be supplied with only one generator. Emergency Caterpillar 3306 harbor generator located at main deck aft provides 105 ekW in case of main generator failure. The emergency set is air cooled and configured for automatic startup on loss of the ships main power. Main engine room is protected with a carbon dioxide extinguishing system. Aqueous Film Forming Foam (AFFF) is provided for protection of the flight deck via a mixed foam tank and proportioners. Electronics includes Furuno GPS with Furuno ARPA 26 plotter, Furuno X and S band radars, Furuno depth sounder, Furuno 8000 GMDSS, Furuno Inmarsat B and C Satcom, Furuno FAX 2084 weatherfax, Tokimec 110GS gyrocompass and Tokimec PR 2213 autopilot. Flight deck located on the after end of the bridge deck can support a helicopter for airborne SAR or emergency evacuation, with a maximum weight of 4,672 kg (10,728 lb). Weapons hardpoints located at the bow can mount heavier caliber guns, which was specified by the PCG.

== Ships in class ==
Hull number	Name	Builder	Commissioned	Status
SARV-5601	BRP San Juan	Tenix Shipbuilding	30 June 2000	Non-operational
SARV-5603	BRP EDSA II	Tenix Shipbuilding	4 October 2000	Non-operational
SARV-5604	BRP Pampanga	Tenix Shipbuilding	30 January 2003	Non-operational
SARV-5605	BRP Batangas	Tenix Shipbuilding	8 August 2003	Non-operational
