= People's Liberation Army Navy =

Maritime service branch of the Chinese People's Liberation Army

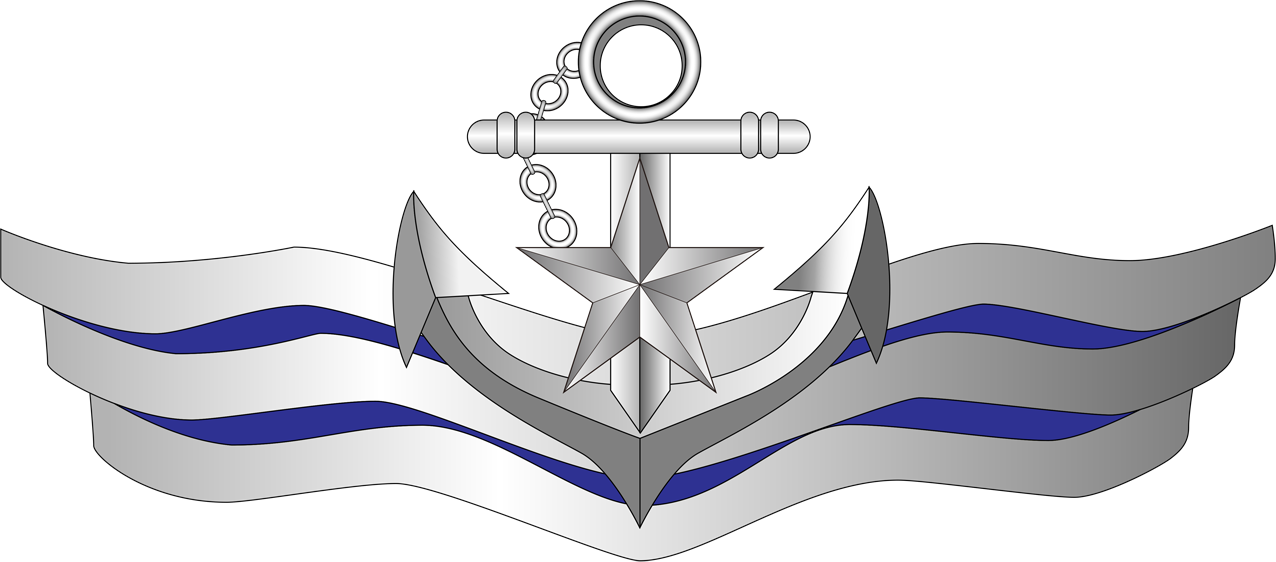
- Emblem of the People's Liberation Army Navy
- Founded: 23 April 1949; 77 years ago
- Country: China
- Allegiance: Chinese Communist Party
- Type: Navy
- Role: Naval warfare
- Size: 384,000 active personnel (2025); 787 ships (2025); 600 aircraft (2025)
- Part of: People's Liberation Army
- March: 人民海军向前进 ("The People's Navy Marches Forward")
- Anniversaries: 23 April annually
- Fleet: 64+ submarines; 3 aircraft carriers; 4 amphibious assault ships; 8 amphibious transport docks; 33 landing ship tanks; 37 landing ship mediums; 61 destroyers; 54 frigates; 50 corvettes; 82 missile boats; 40+ mine countermeasure vessels; 232 auxiliaries including 18 replenishment ships
- Engagements: Chinese Civil War; Vietnam War; Sino-Vietnamese War; Johnson South Reef Skirmish; Anti-piracy operations in Somalia; Red Sea crisis

Commanders
- Commander: Admiral Hu Zhongming
- Political Commissar: Vacant
- Chief of Staff: Admiral Zhang Zheng

Insignia
- Flag and ensign

- Jack

- Badge

- Sleeve badge

Aircraft flown
- Electronic warfare: Y-8
- Fighter: J-11, J-15, J-35
- Helicopter: Z-8, Z-9, Z-20, Mi-8, Z-10, Ka-28, AS365
- Interceptor: J-7, J-8
- Patrol: Y-8, Y-9
- Reconnaissance: Y-9
- Trainer: JL-8, JL-9, JL-10
- Transport: Y-7, Y-9

Chinese name
- Simplified Chinese: 中国人民解放军海军
- Traditional Chinese: 中國人民解放軍海軍
- Literal meaning: China People Liberation Army Sea Army
Transcriptions
Standard Mandarin
- Hanyu Pinyin: Zhōngguó Rénmín Jiěfàngjūn Hǎijūn

People's Navy
- Simplified Chinese: 人民海军
- Traditional Chinese: 人民海軍
- Literal meaning: People Navy
Transcriptions
Standard Mandarin
- Hanyu Pinyin: Rénmín Hǎijūn

Chinese Navy
- Simplified Chinese: 中国海军
- Traditional Chinese: 中國海軍
- Literal meaning: China Navy
Transcriptions
Standard Mandarin
- Hanyu Pinyin: Zhōngguó Hǎijūn

The People's Liberation Army Navy (PLAN), (Note: Chinese: 中国人民解放军海军; pinyin: Zhōngguó Rénmín Jiěfàngjūn Hǎijūn) also known as PLA Navy or Chinese Navy, is the maritime service branch of the People's Liberation Army. The world's largest navy by number of vessels, it maintains more than 700 warships and support vessels as of 2024. Composed of the Surface Force, the Submarine Force, the Coastal Defense Force, the Marine Corps and the Naval Air Force, the PLAN has a total strength of 384,000 personnel, including 55,000 marines and 50,000 naval aviation personnel. PLAN units are deployed among the North Sea, East Sea and South Sea fleets, under the Northern, Eastern and Southern PLA theater commands, respectively.

The PLAN was formally established on 23 April 1949 and traces its lineage to maritime fighting units during the Chinese Civil War, including many elements of the Republic of China Navy which had defected. Until the late 1980s, the PLAN was largely a brown-water navy mostly in charge of coastal defense and patrol against potential Nationalist amphibious invasions and territorial waters disputes, roles now largely relegated to the China Coast Guard. The collapse of the Soviet Union ended a tense border confrontation, and China shifted towards more forward-oriented foreign policy in the 1990s. This included renewed attention to the PLAN, moving toward a green-water navy operating in the marginal seas within the range of coastal air parity.

In the 21st century, the PLAN has modernized, transitioning to a blue-water navy, aiming to operate up to the Pacific's second island chain. China operates 68 submarines, a similar number to the United States Navy, and of which 12 are nuclear-powered. China has commissioned three aircraft carriers since 2012; its latest, the Fujian, is its first indigenously designed and CATOBAR-capable carrier. The PLAN's Type 094 submarines are assigned 72 warheads on JL-3 ballistic missiles, representing 12% of China's nuclear stockpile.

== History ==
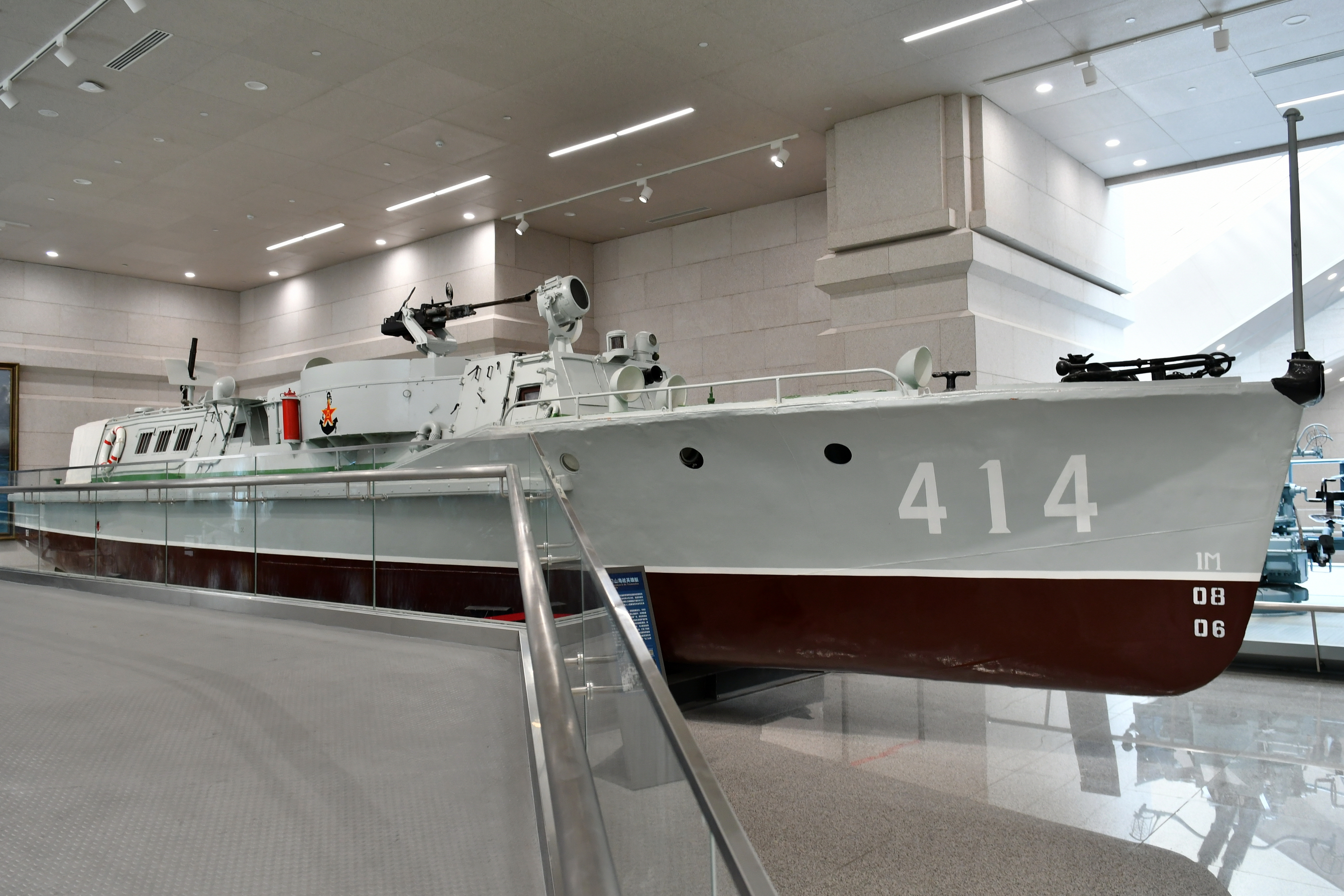
A gunboat used in the Battle of Toumenshan

The PLAN traces its lineage to units of the Republic of China Navy (ROCN) who defected to the People's Liberation Army towards the end of the Chinese Civil War. A number of Japanese and Manchukuo Imperial Navy gunboats used to patrol the river border with the Soviet Union were also handed over to the PLA following the surrender of Japan. In 1949, Mao Zedong asserted that "to oppose imperialist aggression, we must build a powerful navy". During the Landing Operation on Hainan Island, the communists used wooden junks fitted with mountain guns as both transport and warships against the ROCN. The navy was established on 23 April 1949 by consolidating regional naval forces under Joint staff Department command in Jiangyan (now in Taizhou, Jiangsu).

The Naval Academy was set up at Dalian on 22 November 1949, mostly with Soviet instructors. It then consisted of a motley collection of ships and boats acquired from the Kuomintang forces. The Naval Air Force was added two years later. By 1954, an estimated 2,500 Soviet naval advisers were in China—possibly one adviser to every thirty Chinese naval personnel—and the Soviet Union began providing modern ships.

With Soviet assistance, the navy reorganized in 1954 and 1955 into the North Sea Fleet, East Sea Fleet, and South Sea Fleet, and a corps of admirals and other naval officers was established from the ranks of the ground forces. In shipbuilding the Soviets first assisted the Chinese, then the Chinese copied Soviet designs without assistance, and finally the Chinese produced vessels of their own design. Eventually Soviet assistance progressed to the point that a joint Sino-Soviet Pacific Ocean fleet was under discussion.

=== 1950s and 1960s ===
Through the upheavals of the late 1950s and 1960s the Navy remained relatively undisturbed. Under the leadership of Minister of National Defense Lin Biao, large investments were made in naval construction during the frugal years immediately after the Great Leap Forward. During the Cultural Revolution, a number of top naval commissars and commanders were purged.

Naval forces were used to suppress a revolt in Wuhan in July 1967, but the service largely avoided the turmoil affecting the country. Although it paid lip service to Mao and assigned political commissars aboard ships, the Navy continued to train, build, and maintain the fleets as well as the coastal defence and aviation arms, as well as in the performance of its mission.

=== 1970s and 1980s ===
In the 1970s, when approximately 20 percent of the defence budget was allocated to naval forces, the Navy grew dramatically. The conventional submarine force increased from 35 to 100 boats, the number of missile-carrying ships grew from 20 to 200, and the production of larger surface ships, including support ships for oceangoing operations, increased. The Navy also began development of nuclear attack submarines (SSN) and nuclear-powered ballistic missile submarines (SSBN).

In the 1980s, under the leadership of Chief Naval Commander Liu Huaqing, the navy developed into a regional naval power, though naval construction continued at a level somewhat below the 1970s rate. Liu Huaqing was an Army officer who spent most of his career in administrative positions involving science and technology. It was not until 1988 that the People's Liberation Army Navy was led by a naval officer. Liu was also very close to Deng Xiaoping as his modernization efforts were very much in keeping with Deng's national policies.

While under his leadership Naval construction yards produced fewer ships than the 1970s, greater emphasis was placed on technology and qualitative improvement. Modernization efforts also encompassed higher educational and technical standards for personnel; reformulation of the traditional coastal defence doctrine and force structure in favour of more green-water operations; and training in naval combined-arms operations involving submarine, surface, naval aviation, and coastal defence forces.

Examples of the expansion of China's capabilities were the 1980 recovery of an intercontinental ballistic missile (ICBM) in the Western Pacific by a twenty-ship fleet, extended naval operations in the South China Sea in 1984 and 1985, and the visit of two naval ships to three South Asian nations in 1985. In 1982 the navy conducted a successful test of an underwater-launched ballistic missile. The navy also had some success in developing a variety of surface-to-surface and air-to-surface missiles, improving basic capabilities.

In 1986, the Navy's order of battle included two Xia-class SSBNs armed with twelve CSS-N-3 missiles and three Han-class SSNs armed with six SY-2 cruise missiles. In the late 1980s, major deficiencies reportedly remained in anti-submarine warfare, mine warfare, naval electronics (including electronic countermeasures equipment), and naval aviation capabilities.

The PLA Navy was ranked in 1987 as the third largest navy in the world, although naval personnel had comprised only 12 percent of PLA strength. In 1987 the Navy consisted (as it does now) of the naval headquarters in Beijing; three fleet commands – the North Sea Fleet, based at Qingdao, Shandong; the East Sea Fleet, based at Ningbo; and the South Sea Fleet, based at Zhanjiang, Guangdong – and about 1,000 ships of which only approximately 350 are ocean going. The rest are small patrol or support craft.

The 350,000-person Navy included Naval Air Force units of 34,000 men, the Coastal Defense Forces of 38,000, and the Marine Corps of 56,500. Navy Headquarters, which controlled the three fleet commands, was subordinate to the PLA General Staff Department. In 1987, China's 1,500 km coastline was protected by approximately 70 diesel-powered Romeo- and Whiskey-class submarines, which could remain at sea only a limited time.

Inside this protective ring and within range of shore-based aircraft were destroyers and frigates mounting Styx anti-ship missiles, depth-charge projectors, and guns up to 130 mm. Any invader penetrating the destroyer and frigate protection would have been swarmed by almost 900 fast-attack craft. Stormy weather limited the range of these small boats, however, and curtailed air support. Behind the inner ring were Coastal Defense Force personnel operating naval shore batteries of Styx missiles and guns, backed by ground force units deployed in depth.

=== 1990s and 2000s ===
As the 21st century approached, the PLAN began to transition to an off-shore defensive strategy that entailed more out-of-area operations away from its traditional territorial waters. From 1990 to 2002, Jiang Zemin's military reforms placed particular emphasis on the Navy.

Between 1989 and 1993, the training ship Zhenghe paid ports visits to Hawaii, Thailand, Bangladesh, Pakistan, and India. PLAN vessels visited Vladivostok in 1993, 1994, 1995, and 1996. PLAN task groups also paid visits to Indonesia in 1995; North Korea in 1997; New Zealand, Australia, and the Philippines in 1998; Malaysia, Tanzania, South Africa, the United States, and Canada in 2000; and India, Pakistan, France, Italy, Germany, Britain, Hong Kong, Australia, and New Zealand in 2001.

In March 1997, the Luhu-class guided missile destroyer Harbin, the Luda-class guided missile destroyer Zhuhai, and the replenishment oiler Nancang began the PLA Navy's first circumnavigation of the Pacific Ocean, a 98-day voyage with port visits to Mexico, Peru, Chile, and the United States, including Pearl Harbor and San Diego. The flotilla was under the command of Vice Admiral Wang Yongguo, the commander-in-chief of the South Sea Fleet.

The Luhu-class guided missile destroyer Qingdao and the replenishment oiler Taicang completed the PLA Navy's first circumnavigation of the world (pictured), a 123-day voyage covering 32,000 nautical miles (59,000 km; 37,000 mi) between 15 May – 23 September 2002. Port visits included Changi, Singapore; Alexandria, Egypt; Aksis, Turkey; Sevastopol, Ukraine; Piraeus, Greece; Lisbon, Portugal; Fortaleza, Brazil; Guayaquil, Ecuador; Callao, Peru; and Papeete in French Polynesia. The PLA naval vessels participated in naval exercises with the French frigates Nivôse and Prairial, as well as exercises with the Peruvian Navy. The flotilla was under the command of Vice Admiral Ding Yiping, the commander-in-chief of the North Sea Fleet, and Captain Li Yujie was the commanding officer of the Qingdao.

Overall, between 1985 and 2006, PLAN naval vessels visited 18 Asian-Pacific nations, 4 South American nations, 8 European nations, 3 African nations, and 3 North American nations. In 2003, the PLAN conducted its first joint naval exercises during separate visits to Pakistan and India. Bilateral naval exercises were also carried out with exercises with the French, British, Australian, Canadian, Philippine, and United States navies.

On 26 December 2008, the PLAN dispatched a task group consisting of the guided missile destroyer Haikou (flagship), the guided missile destroyer Wuhan, and the supply ship Weishanhu to the Gulf of Aden to participate in anti-piracy operations off the coast of Somalia. A team of 16 Chinese Special Forces members from its Marine Corps armed with attack helicopters were on board. Since then, China has maintained a three-ship flotilla of two warships and one supply ship in the Gulf of Aden by assigning ships to the Gulf of Aden on a three monthly basis. Other recent PLAN incidents include the 2001 Hainan Island incident, a major submarine accident in 2003, and naval incidents involving the U.S. MSC-operated ocean surveillance ships Victorious and Impeccable during 2009. At the occasion of the 60th anniversary of the PLAN, 52 to 56 vessels were shown in manoeuvres off Qingdao in April 2009 including previously unseen nuclear submarines.

The demonstration was seen as a sign of the growing status of China, while the CMC chairman, Hu Jintao, indicated that China is neither seeking regional hegemony nor entering an arms race. Predictions by Western analysts that the PLAN would outnumber the USN submarine force as early as 2011 have failed to come true because the PRC curtailed both imports and domestic production of submarines.

=== 2010s and 2020s ===
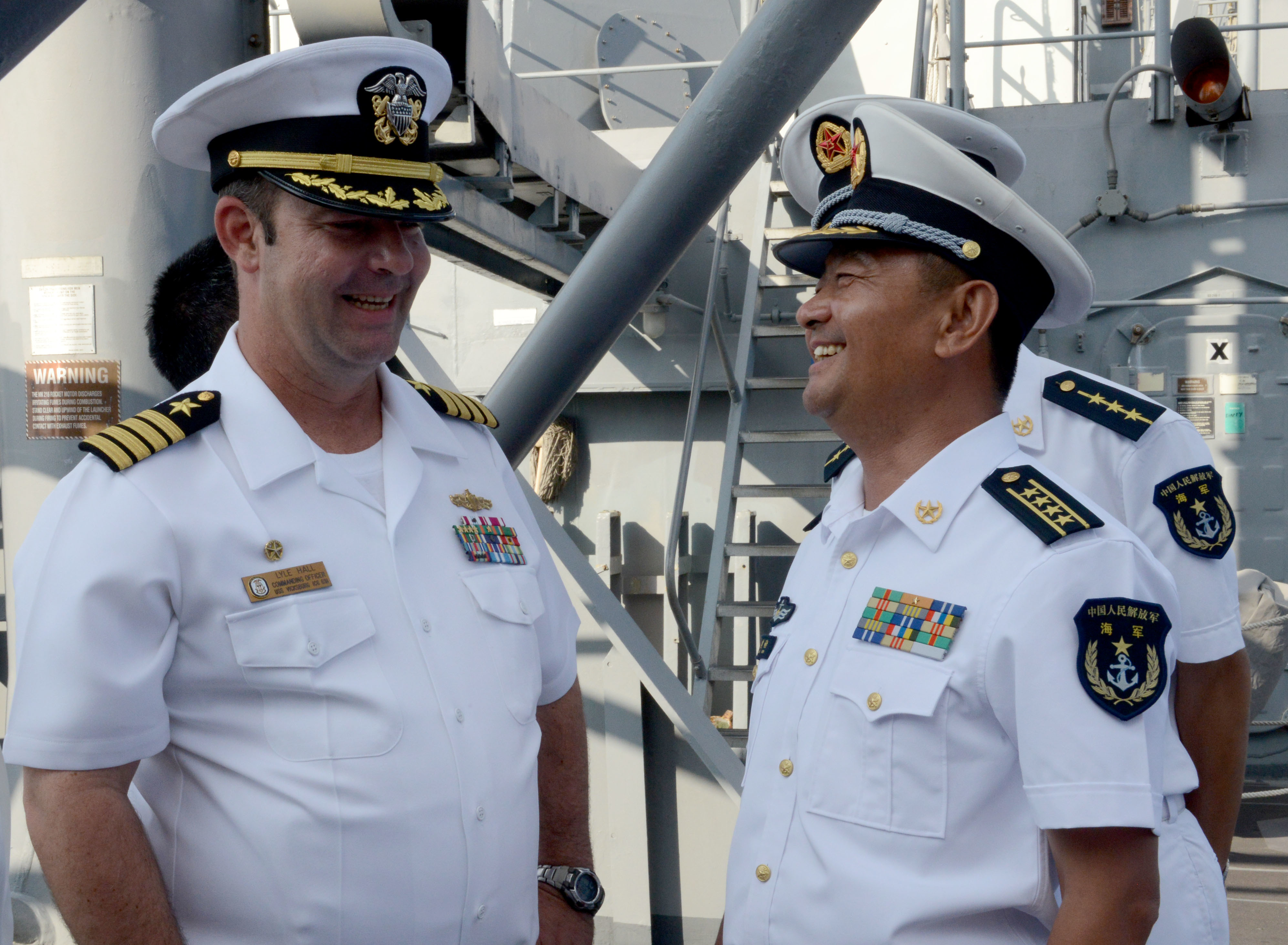
PLAN Captain Wang, commanding officer of the destroyer Jinan greets USN Captain Lyle Hall during a goodwill port visit in 2015

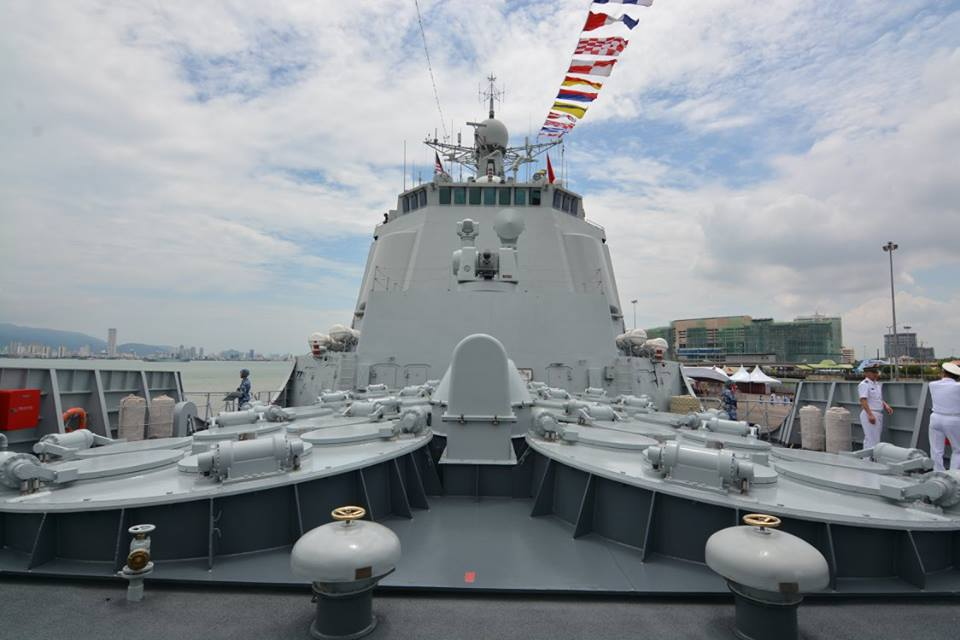
A Type 052C destroyer, Changchun, in Butterworth, Penang, Malaysia in 2017

Beginning in 2009, China ordered 4 Zubr-class LCAC from Ukraine and bought 4 more from the Hellenic Navy (Greece). These hovercraft/LCACs are built to send troops and armoured vehicles (tanks, etc.) onto beaches in a fast manner, acting as a landing craft, and were viewed to be a direct threat to Taiwan's pro-independence movement as well as the conflict over Senkaku Islands. China is continually shifting the power balance in Asia by building up the Navy's Submarines, Amphibious warfare, and surface warfare capabilities.

Between 5–12 July 2013, a seven-ship task force from the North Sea Fleet joined warships from the Russian Pacific Fleet to participate in Joint Sea 2013, bilateral naval maneuvers held in the Peter the Great Bay of the Sea of Japan. To date, Joint Sea 2013 was the largest naval drill yet undertaken by the People's Liberation Army Navy with a foreign navy.

In 2014, China commissioned its first Type 052D destroyer, of which at least 35 are active as of September 2026. This marked a major milestone as end of a series of classes of destroyers of which only small numbers were procured, each batch marking improvements from the previous; examples of these classes include the sole Type 051B destroyer and the two Type 052B destroyers.

On 2 April 2015, during the violent aftermath of a coup d'état in Yemen and amid an international bombing campaign, the PLAN helped ten countries get their citizens out of Yemen safely, evacuating them aboard a missile frigate from the besieged port city of Aden. The operation was described by Reuters as "the first time that China's military has helped other countries evacuate their people during an international crisis".

China's participation in international maritime exercises is also increasing. In RIMPAC 2014, China was invited to send ships from their People's Liberation Army Navy; marking not only the first time China participated in a RIMPAC exercise but also the first time China participated in a large-scale United States-led naval drill. On 9 June 2014, China confirmed it would be sending four ships to the exercise, a destroyer, frigate, supply ship, & hospital ship. In April 2016, the People's Republic of China was also invited to RIMPAC 2016 despite the tension in South China Sea.

PRC military expert Yin Zhuo said that due to present weaknesses in the PLAN's ability to replenish their ships at sea, their future aircraft carriers will be forced to operate in pairs. In a TV interview, Zhang Zhaozhong suggest otherwise, saying China is "unlikely to put all her eggs in one basket" and that the navy will likely rotate between carriers rather than deploy them all at once.

In 2017, PLAN hospital ship Peace Ark travelled to Djibouti (treating 7,841 Djiboutians), Sierra Leone, Gabon, Republic of Congo (treating 7,508 Congolese), Angola, Mozambique (treating 9,881 Mozambiquans), and Tanzania (treating 6,421 Tanzanians).

The PLAN continued its expansion into the 2020s, increasing its operational capacity, commissioning new ships, and constructing naval facilities. Observers note that the PLAN's ongoing modernization is intended to build up the Chinese surface fleet and fix existing issues that limit the capability of the PLAN. Observers have noted that the PLAN's expansion will allow it to project Chinese power in the South China Sea and allow for the navy to counter the USN's operations in Asia. Chinese naval capability increased substantially in the 2010s and 2020s. In two decades, the PLA Navy fielded 4,300 vertical launching system (VLS) cells on its surface combatants. According to the US-based think tank RAND Corporation, PLAN enjoyed major advantages in terms of naval technologies, missiles, and tonnage against regional rivals such as Taiwan, Japan, Vietnam, the Philippines, and India.

In 2024 the PLAN carried out unprecedented training exercises. These included two aircraft carrier strike groups, Liaoning and Shandong, operating together in the South China Sea for the first time. The PLAN uses at least 9 overseas ports strategically for refuelling, surveillance and intelligence. Typically the ports are owned by Chinese firms. These ports can be used to keep influence and control throughout the world. In 2025 the two carrier strike groups operated for the first time in the western Pacific beyond the first island chain, and one of them crossed the second island chain for the first time. In 2026, China increased the missile capacity of its Type-054B frigates with up to 48 missile-launching tubes.

== Organizational structure ==
=== Administrative structure ===
The PLAN central HQ is directly subordinate to the CMC. The PLAN HQ functional offices have the administrative command, control, coordination, and force construction duties over all naval forces. The PLAN is divided into five major "arms" or service branches (兵种): the Surface Force, the Submarine Force, the Coastal Defense Force, the Marine Corps, and the Naval Air Force.

==== Functional offices ====
After the 2016 reforms, the main offices of the PLAN HQ are:

- General Staff Department (参谋部)
- Political Work Department (政治工作部)
- Logistics Department (后勤部)
- Equipment Department (装备部)
- Commission for Discipline Inspection (纪律检查委员会, 监察委员会)

==== Theater-level Combat Arm ====
- PLAN Marine Corps
- PLAN Air Force

==== Directly subordinate support units ====
- PLAN Experimental Base (海军试验基地)
- PLAN Carrier-based Aircraft Comprehensive Experimental Training Base (海军舰载机综合试验训练基地)
- PLA Djibouti Support Base (解放军驻吉布提保障基地)
- PLAN Research Institute (海军研究院)

==== Directly Subordinate Academic Institutions ====
- Naval Command College
- Naval University of Engineering
- Naval Aviation University
- Naval Medical University
- Dalian Naval Academy
- Naval Submarine Academy
- Naval Service Academy
- Naval NCO School

=== Operational units ===
Operationally, the PLAN's naval forces are subordinate to the CMC Joint Operations Command Center through the Theater Command's own Joint Operations Command Center (T-JOCC). The three fleets (one per Theater) has in turn an Each fleet has their own headquarters, headed like all PLA units by a dual team of a commander and a political commissar, and each has set up a “maritime operations sub-center” (MOSC) (海上作战分中心) to coordinate operations. The fleets are in turn organized into formations (编队) consisting on various numbers of vessels, each under the operational control of a "formation command post" (编队指挥所). Fleet units are ordinarily organized into zhidui (支队, usually translated as "flotilla") of divisional or brigade grade, and dadui (大队, usually translated as "squadron") of regimental or battalion grade. Temporary smaller detachments (中队), and larger task forces (战斗群) or "clusters" (集群) can be organized according to circumstances. The Coastal Defense Force, Marine Corps, and Naval Air Force are organized in brigades.

While the CMC Joint Operations Command Center has superior command, the Theater Command's T-JOCC has immediate operational control of all services in its jurisdiction. (Note: with the likely exception of the PLARF's nuclear missiles, which are directly controlled by the CMC) A peculiar case is the East Sea Joint Command Center established in 2013, which has operational control over all forces above, on, and under that sea, including PLAN, PLAAF, China Coast Guard, and Maritime Militia.

=== Fleets ===
The People's Liberation Army Navy is divided into three fleets:

- The Northern Theater Command Fleet (North Sea Fleet), based in the Yellow Sea and headquartered in Qingdao, Shandong.
- The Eastern Theater Command Fleet (East Sea Fleet), based in the East China Sea and headquartered in Ningbo, Zhejiang.
- The Southern Theater Command Fleet (South Sea Fleet), based in the South China Sea and headquartered in Zhanjiang, Guangdong.

Territorially, each fleet has two or three Bases (基地), (Note: In English, usually written in uppercase to differentiate command Bases (hierarchical units) from ordinary operational bases (facilities)) each with a number of subordinate Maritime Garrison Areas (水警区), each with a given spatial jurisdiction, usually only over territorial waters. Deep blue sea operations are controlled at Theater and Fleet levels.

=== Branches ===
==== PLAN Surface Force ====
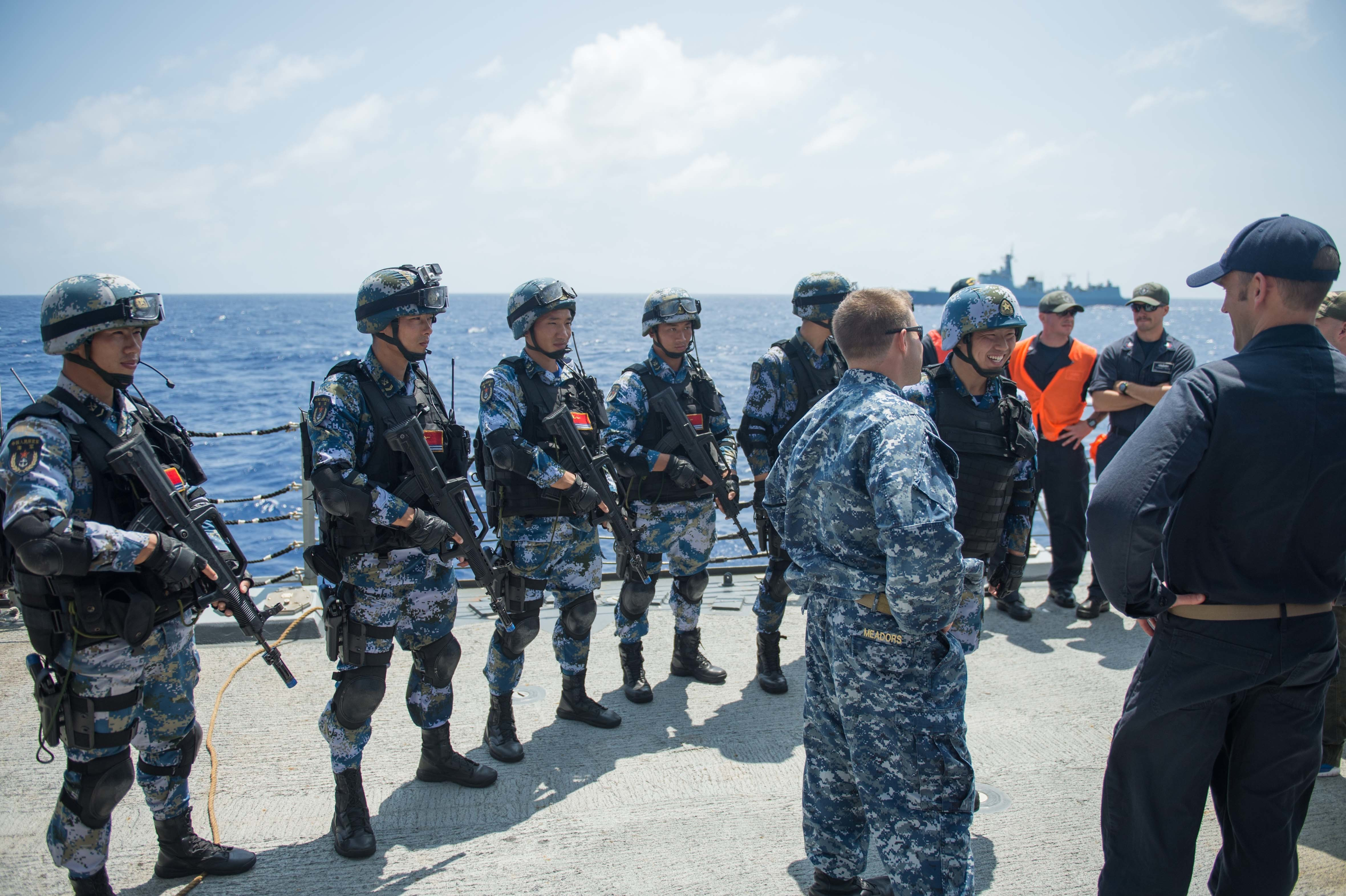
Sailors from the U.S. Navy talk with Chinese Navy sailors from the destroyer Xi'an after the Rim of the Pacific 2016 (RIMPAC 2016) exercise

The People's Liberation Army Surface Force consists of all surface warships in service with the PLAN. They are organised into flotillas spread across the three main fleets.

==== PLAN Submarine Force ====
The People's Liberation Army Navy Submarine Force consists of all nuclear and diesel-electric submarines in service with the PLAN.

The PRC is the last of the permanent members of the United Nations Security Council which has not conducted an operational ballistic missile submarine patrol, because of institutional problems. It operates a fleet of 68 submarines.

==== PLAN Coastal Defense Force ====
The PLAN Coastal Defence Force is a land-based branch of the PLAN in charge of coastal defence with a strength of around 25,000 personnel. Also known as the coastal defence troops, they serve to defend China's coastal and littoral areas from invasion via amphibious landings or air attacks.

Between the 1950s and 1960s, the Coastal Defense Force was primarily assigned to repel any Kuomintang attempts to infiltrate, invade and harass the Chinese coastline. After the Sino-Soviet split and the abandonment of KMT's plans to recapture the Mainland, the Coastal Defense Force was focused on defending China's coast from a possible Soviet seaborne invasion throughout the 1960s to 1980s.

With the fall of the Soviet Union, the threat of an amphibious invasion of China has diminished and therefore the branch is often considered to no longer be a vital component of the PLAN, especially as the surface warships of the PLAN continue to improve in terms of anti-ship and air-defence capabilities and the PLAN's power projection begins to extend beyond the first island chain.

Today the primary weapons of the coastal defence troops are the YJ-62, YJ-18, YJ-12, and C-602 anti-ship missiles, plus SAM and SHORAD batteries.

==== PLAN Marine Corps ====
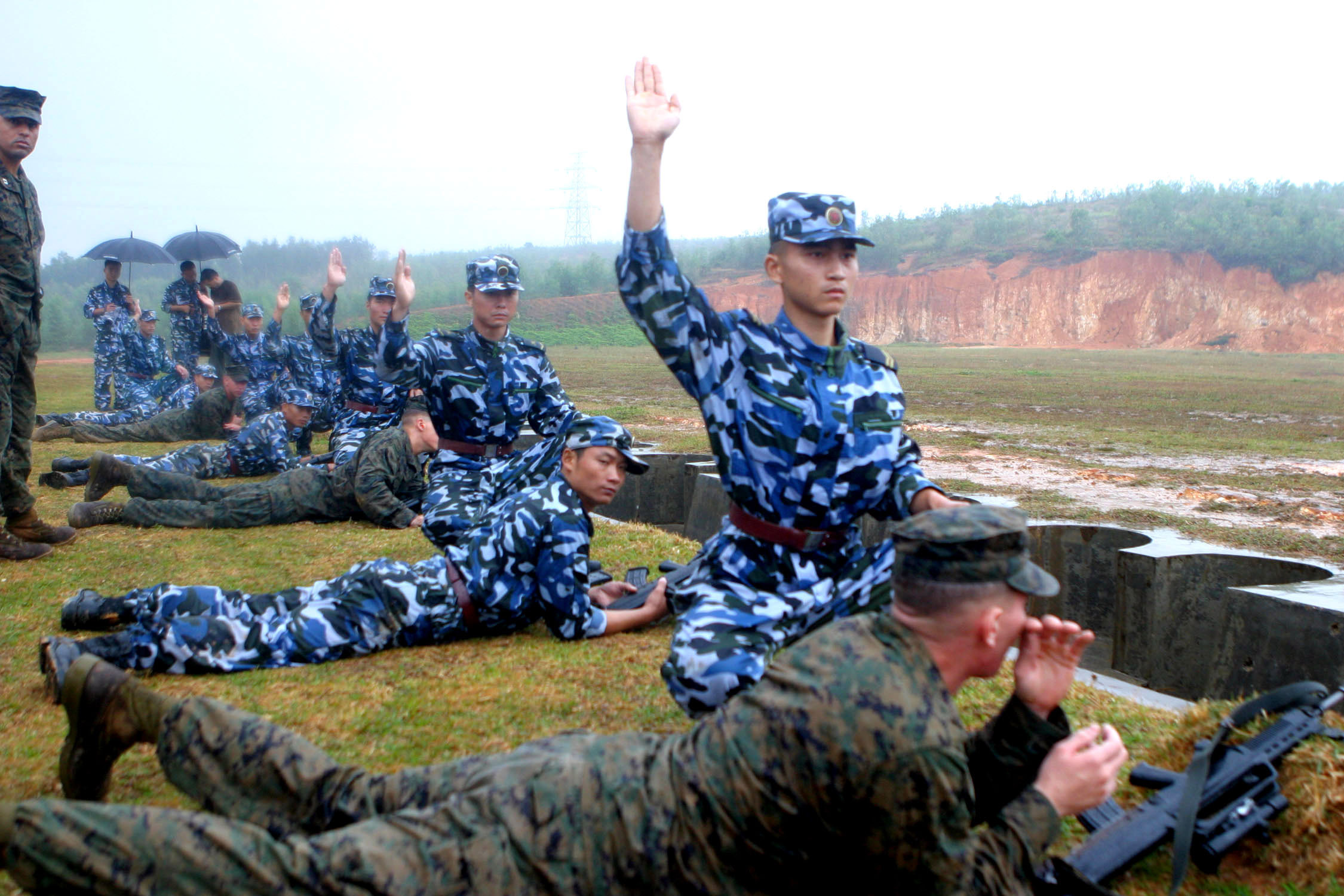
PLAN Marines of the 1st Marine Brigade and members of the USMC fire the Type 95 Assault Rifle during an exchange exercise in 2006.

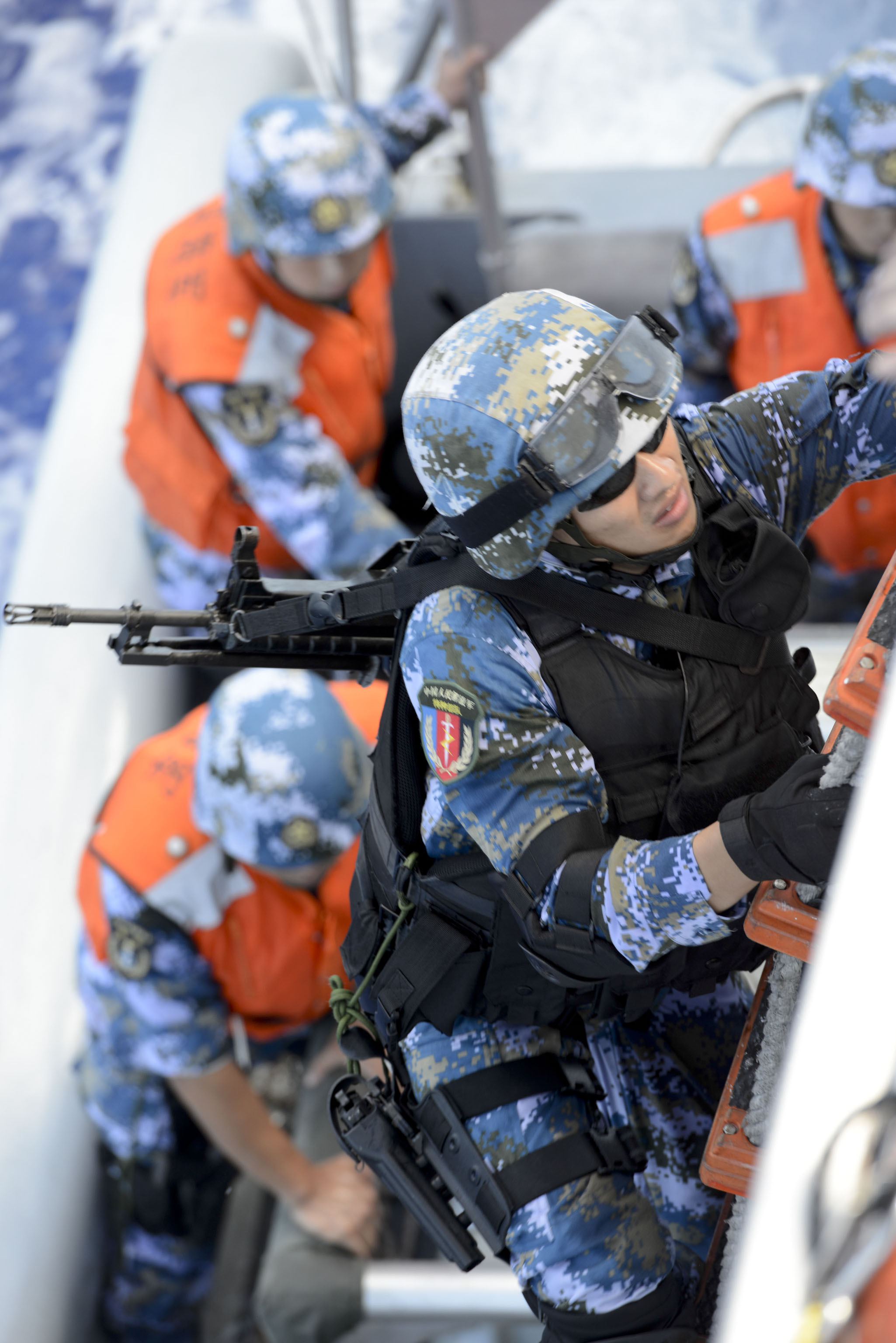
A PLAN marine with a boarding team assigned to the guided missile destroyer Haikou during a maritime operations exercise in RIMPAC 2014.

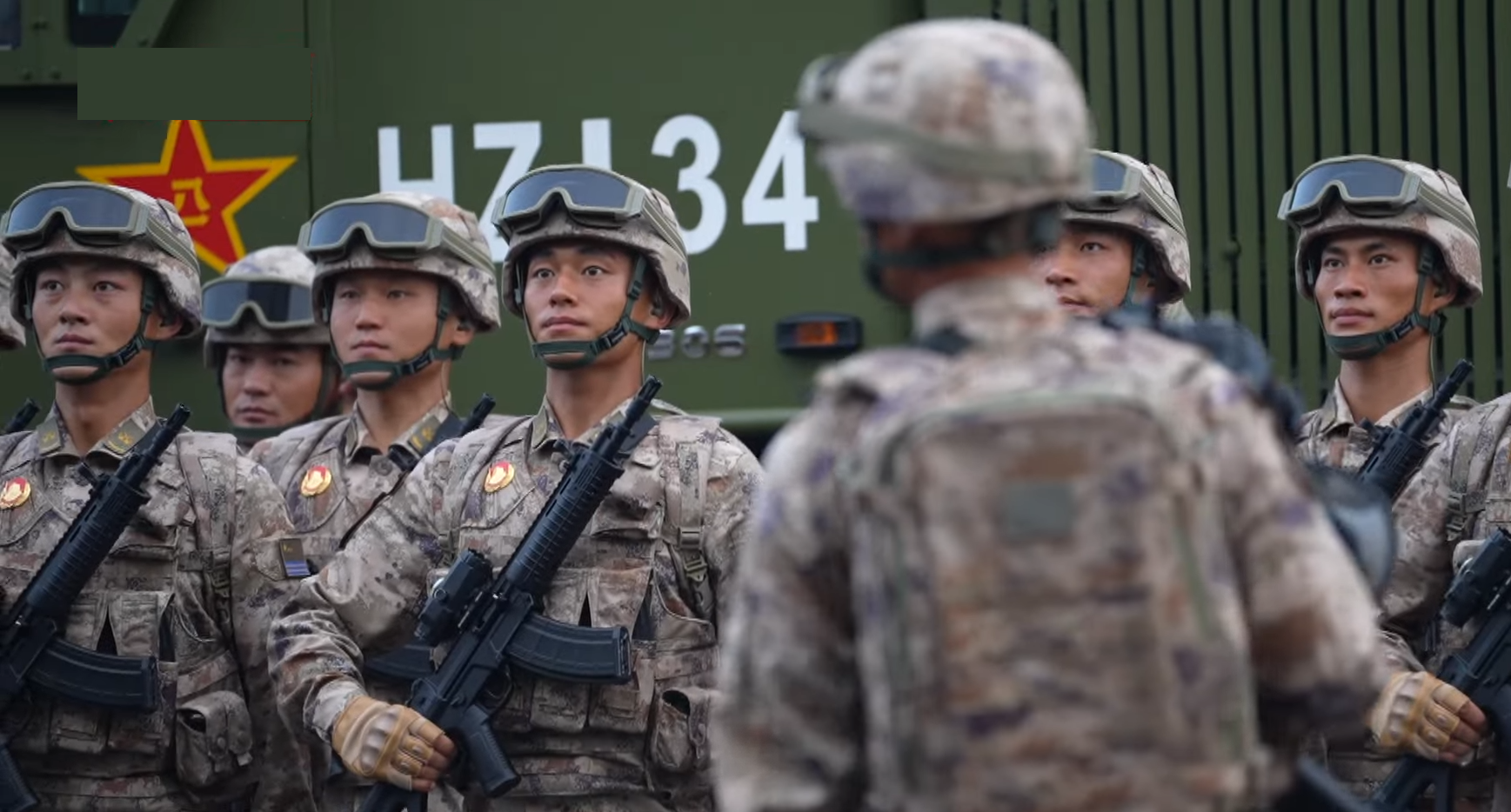
PLAN Marines in 2025

The PLAN Marine Corps was originally established in the 1950s and then re-established in 1979 under PLAN organisation. It consists of around 30,000-40,000 marines, with roughly two brigades in each theatre. The Marine Corps are considered elite troops, and are rapid deployment forces trained primarily in amphibious warfare and sometimes in air assaults to establish a beachhead or act as a spearhead during assault operations against enemy targets.

The marines are equipped with the standard Type 95 assault rifles as well as other small arms and personnel equipment, and until 2022 they had distinct blue/littoral camouflage uniform as standard (now being replaced by more subdued coloring based on the xingkong pattern). The marines are also equipped with amphibious armoured fighting vehicles (including amphibious assault vehicles such as the ZTD-05 and IFVs such as ZBD-05), helicopters, naval artillery, anti-aircraft weapon systems, and short range surface-to-air missiles.

With the PLAN's accelerating efforts to expand its capabilities beyond territorial waters, it would be likely for the Marine Corps to play a greater role in terms of being an offshore expeditionary force similar to the USMC and Royal Marines.

==== PLAN Air Force ====
The People's Liberation Army Navy Air Force (PLANAF) is the naval aviation branch of the PLAN and has a strength of around 25,000 personnel and 690 aircraft. It operates similar hardware as the People's Liberation Army Air Force, including fighter aircraft, bombers, attack aircraft, tankers, reconnaissance/early warning aircraft, electronic warfare aircraft, maritime patrol aircraft, transport aircraft and helicopters of various roles.

The PLA Naval Air Force traditionally operated from coastal air bases, and received older aircraft than the PLAAF with less ambitious steps towards mass modernization. Advancements in new technologies, weaponry and aircraft acquisition were made after 2000. With the introduction of China's first aircraft carrier, Liaoning, in 2012, the Naval Air Force began conducting carrier-based operations for the first time with the goal of building carrier battle group-focused blue water capabilities. In 2023, the PLANAF transferred the majority of its land-based combat planes to the PLAAF, in exchange for more investment on ship-based aircraft (both carrier based like the Shenyang J-35, or ship-borne like helicopters).

The PLANAF naval air bases include:

- North Sea Fleet: Dalian, Qingdao, Jinxi, Jiyuan, Laiyang, Jiaoxian, Xingtai, Laishan, Anyang, Changzhi, Liangxiang and Shan Hai Guan
- East Sea Fleet: Danyang, Daishan, Shanghai (Dachang), Ningbo, Luqiao, Feidong and Shitangqiao
- South Sea Fleet: Foluo, Haikou, Lingshui, Sanya, Guiping, Jialaishi and Lingling

=== Relationship with other maritime organizations of China ===
The PLAN is complemented by paramilitary maritime services such as the China Coast Guard. The Chinese Coast Guard was previously not under an independent command, considered part of the People's Armed Police, under the local (provincial) border defence command, prior to its reorganization and consolidation as an unified service. It was formed from the integration of several formerly separate services such as China Marine Surveillance (CMS), General Administration of Customs, Armed Police, China Fishery Law Enforcement and local maritime militia.

The CMS performed mostly coastal and ocean search and rescue or patrols, and received quite a few large patrol ships that significantly enhanced their operations; while Customs, militia, Armed Police and Fishery Law Enforcement operated hundreds of small patrol craft. For maritime patrol services, these craft are usually quite well armed with machine guns and 37mm anti-aircraft guns. In addition, these services operated their own small aviation fleets to assist their maritime patrol capabilities, with Customs and CMS operating a handful of Harbin Z-9 helicopters, and a maritime patrol aircraft based on the Harbin Y-12 STOL transport.

Every coastal province has 1 to 3 Coast Guard squadrons:

- 3 Squadrons: Fujian, Guangdong
- 2 Squadrons: Liaoning, Shandong, Zhejiang, Hainan, Guangxi
- 1 Squadron: Heibei, Tianjin, Jiangsu, Shanghai

== Ranks ==
The ranks in the People's Liberation Army Navy are similar to those of the People's Liberation Army Ground Force, Air Force and the Rocket Force. The current system of officer ranks and insignia dates from 1988 and is a revision of the ranks and insignia used from 1955 to 1965. The rank of Hai Jun Yi Ji Shang Jiang (First Class Admiral) was never held and was abolished in 1994. With the official introduction of the Type 07 uniforms all officer insignia are on either shoulders or sleeves depending on the type of uniform used. The current system of enlisted ranks and insignia dates from 1998.

=== Commissioned officer ranks ===
The rank insignia of commissioned officers.

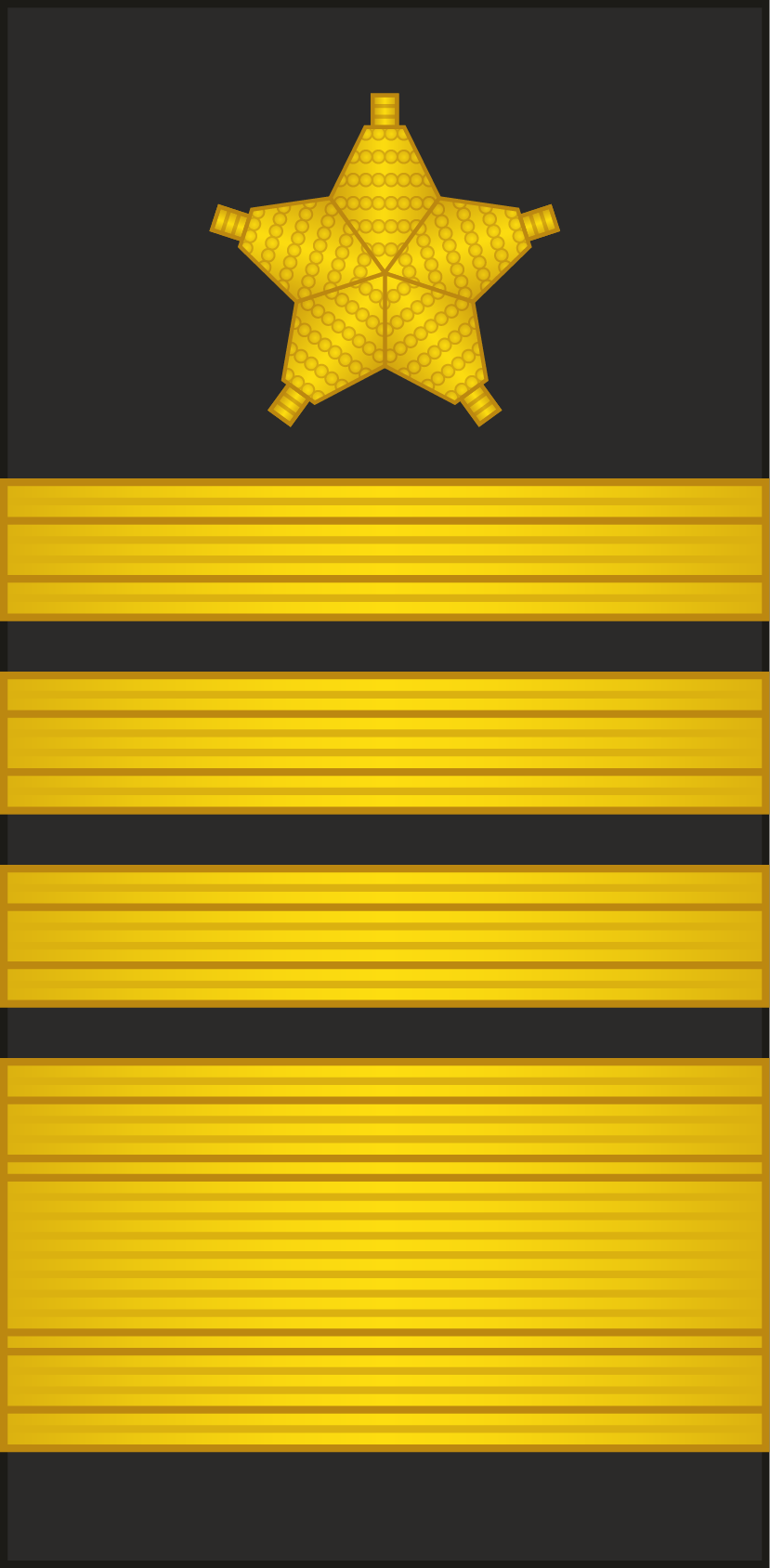
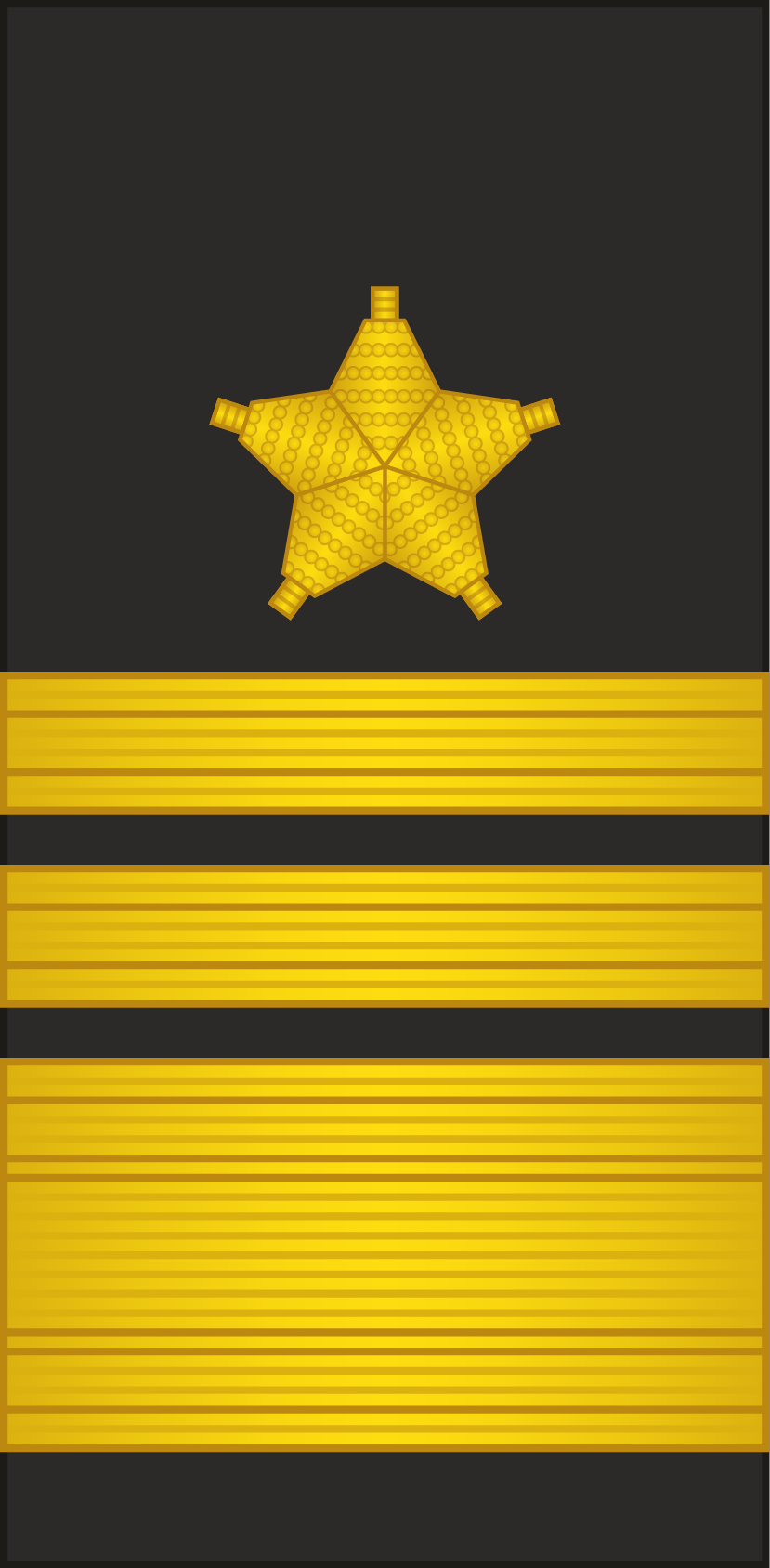
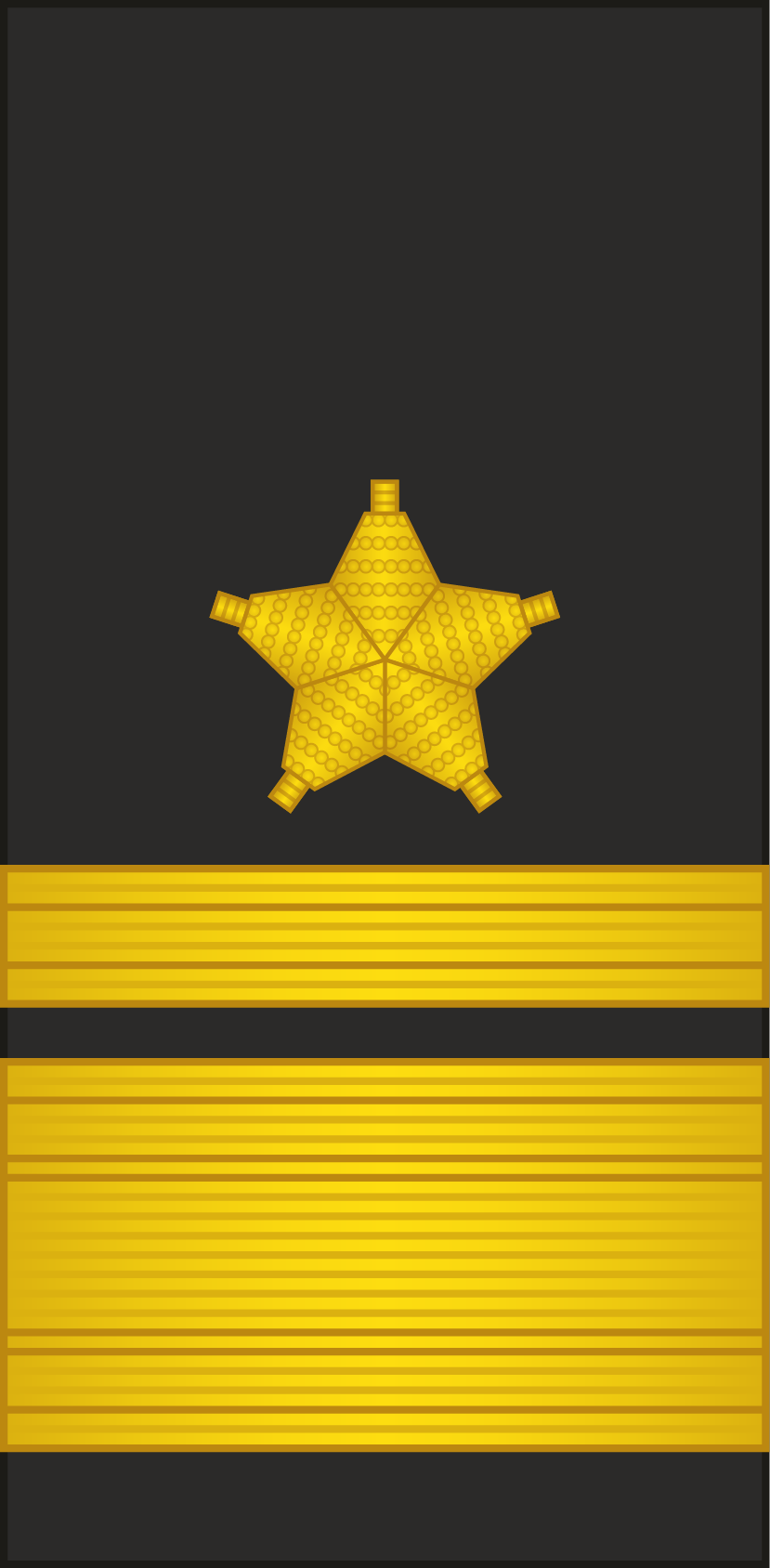
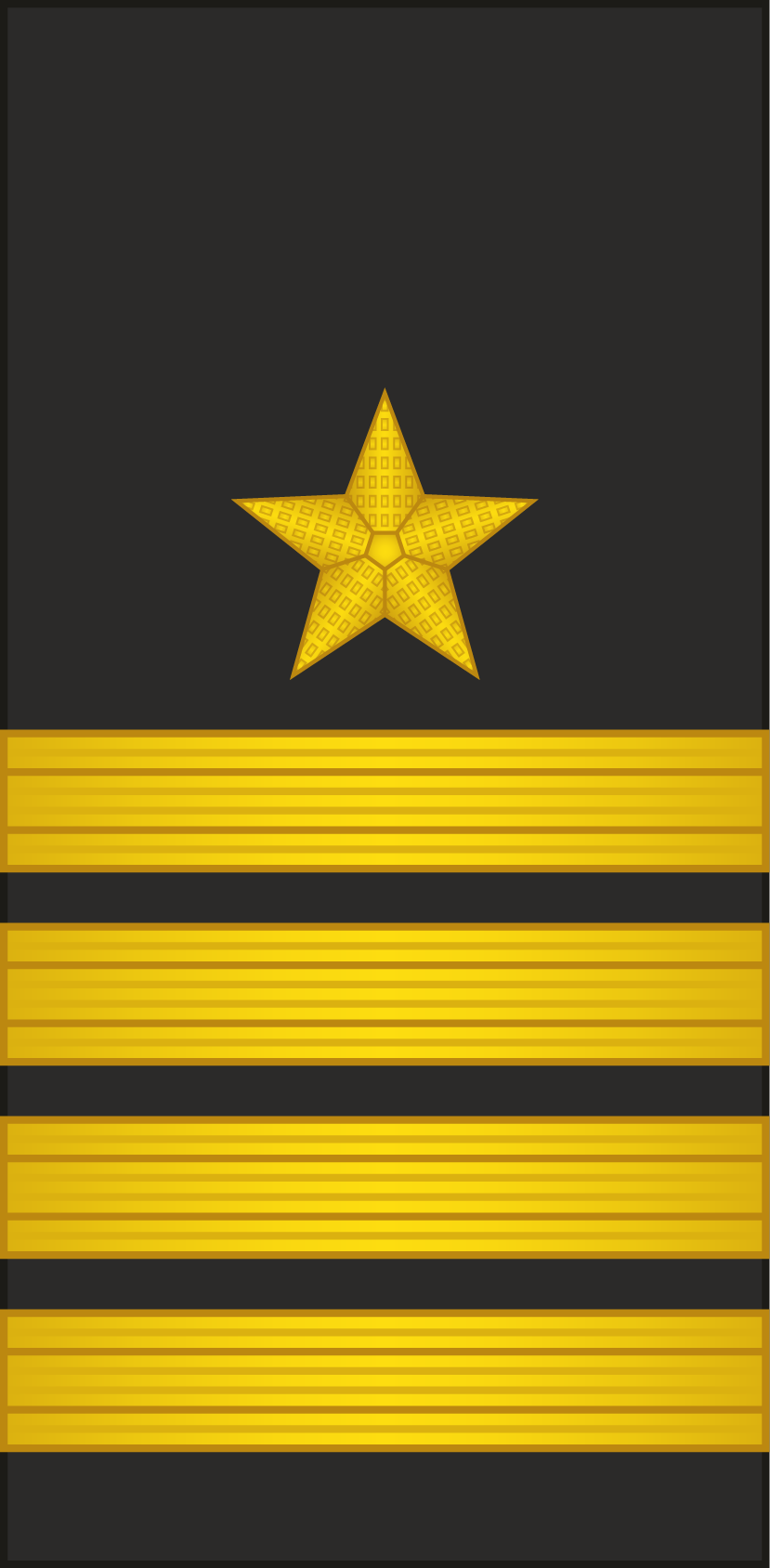
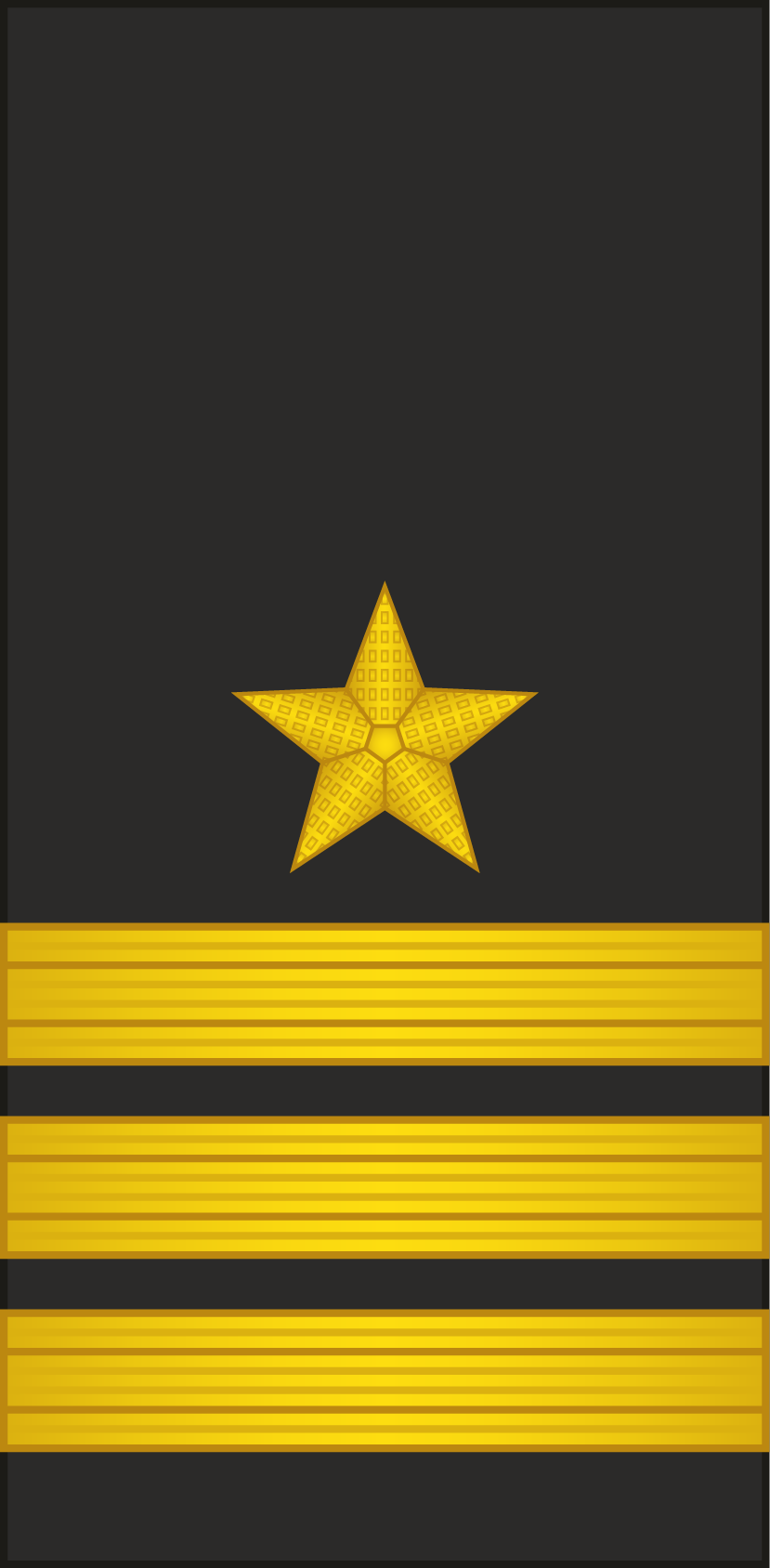
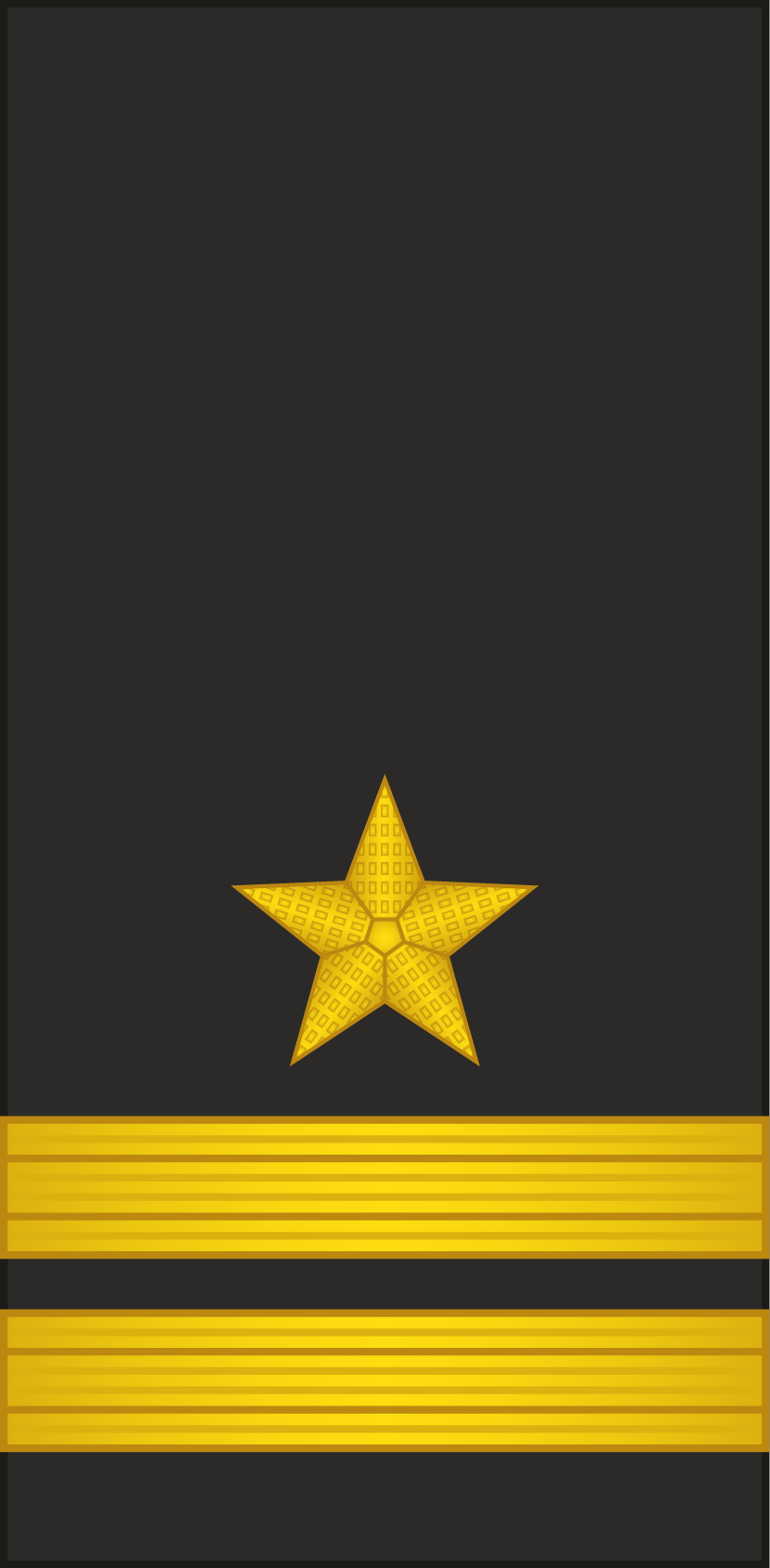
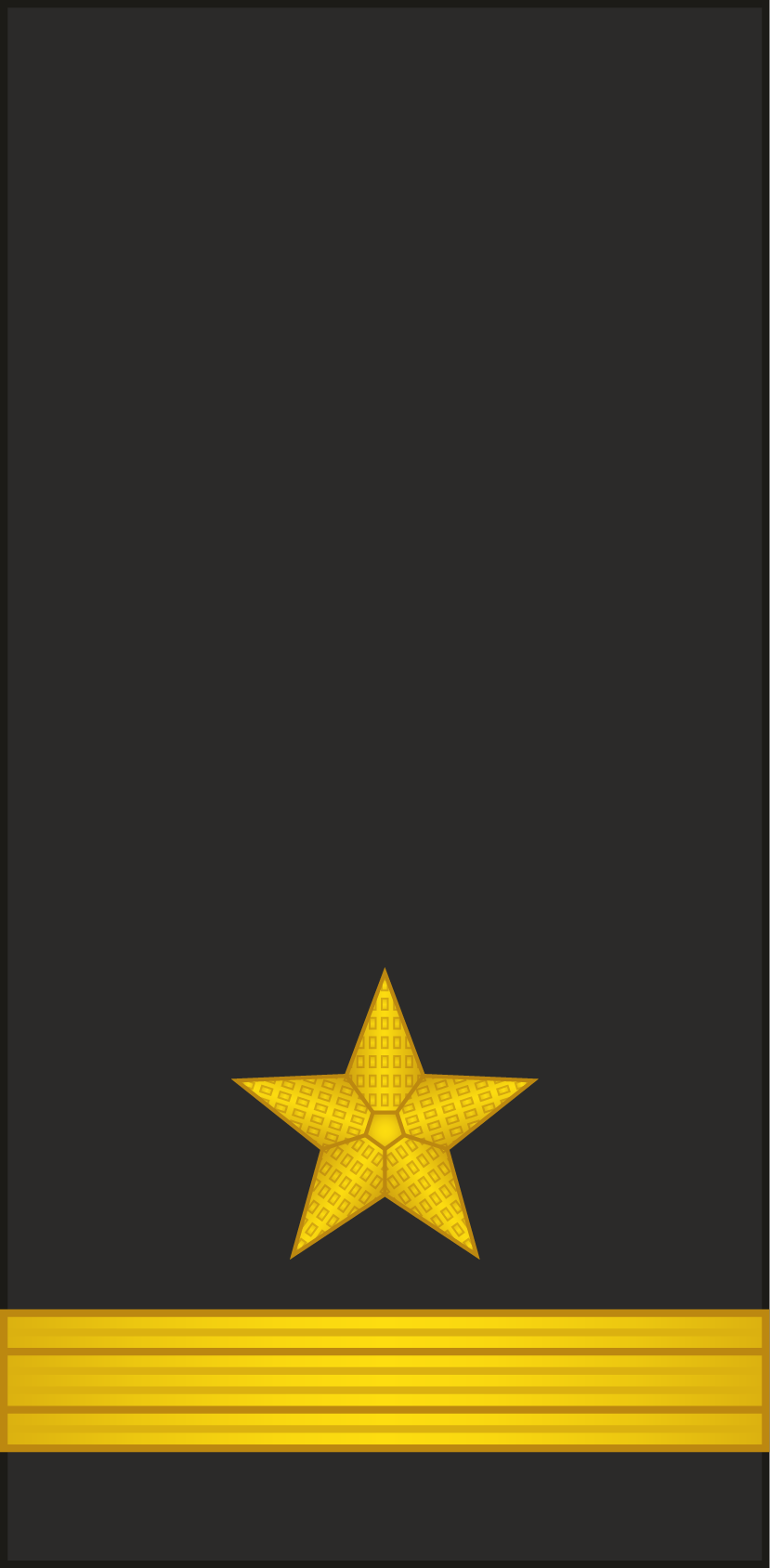
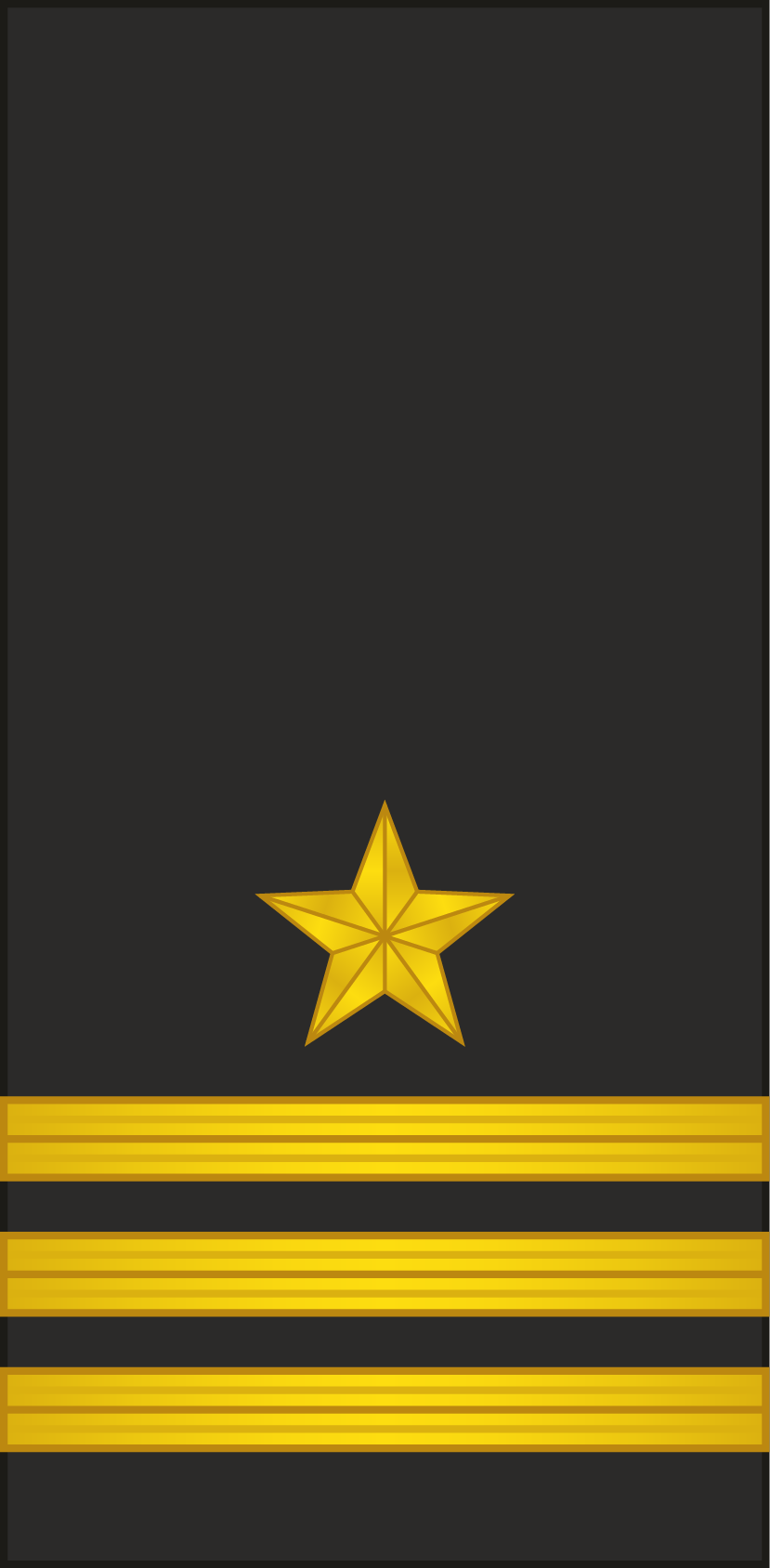
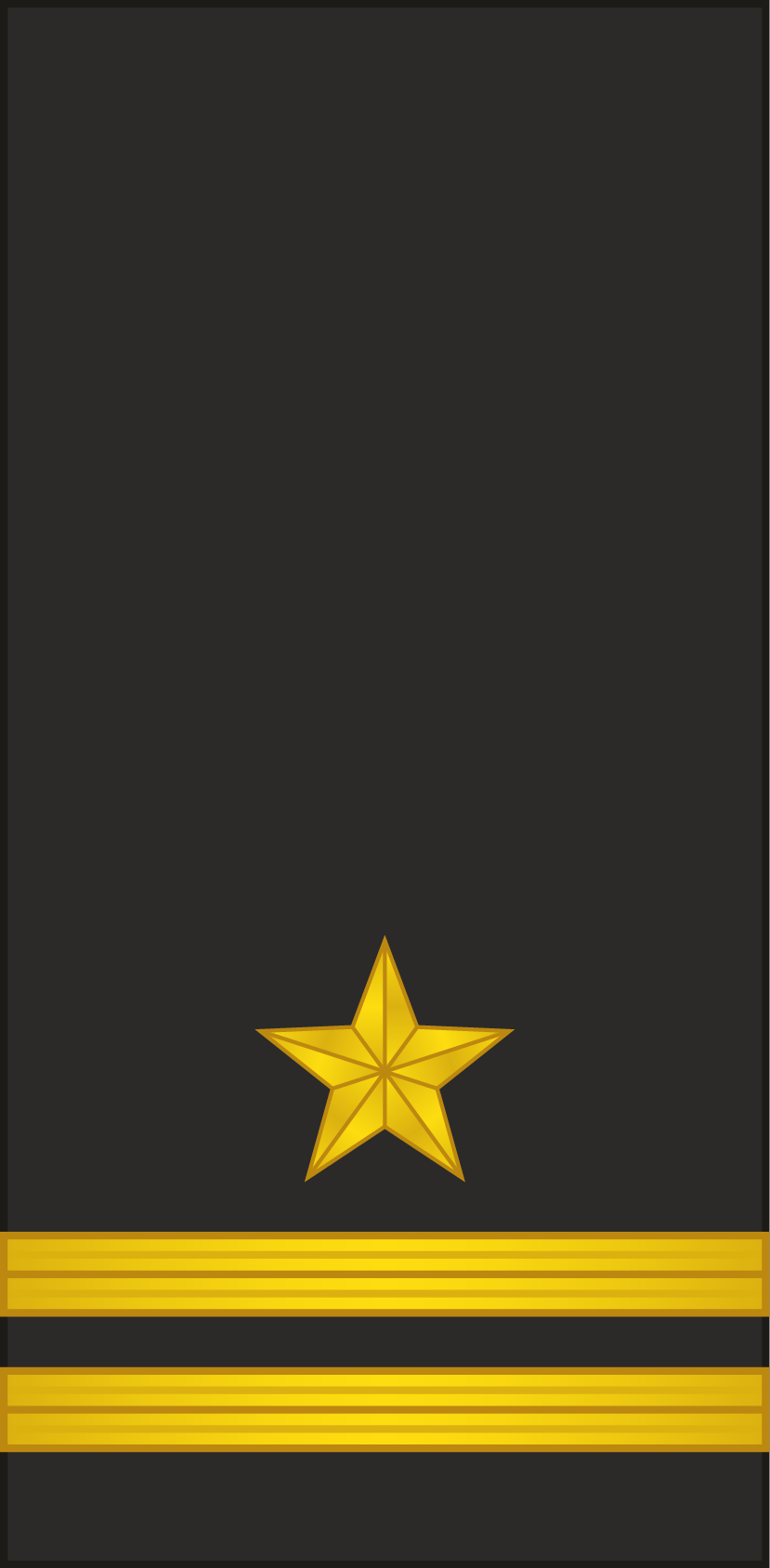
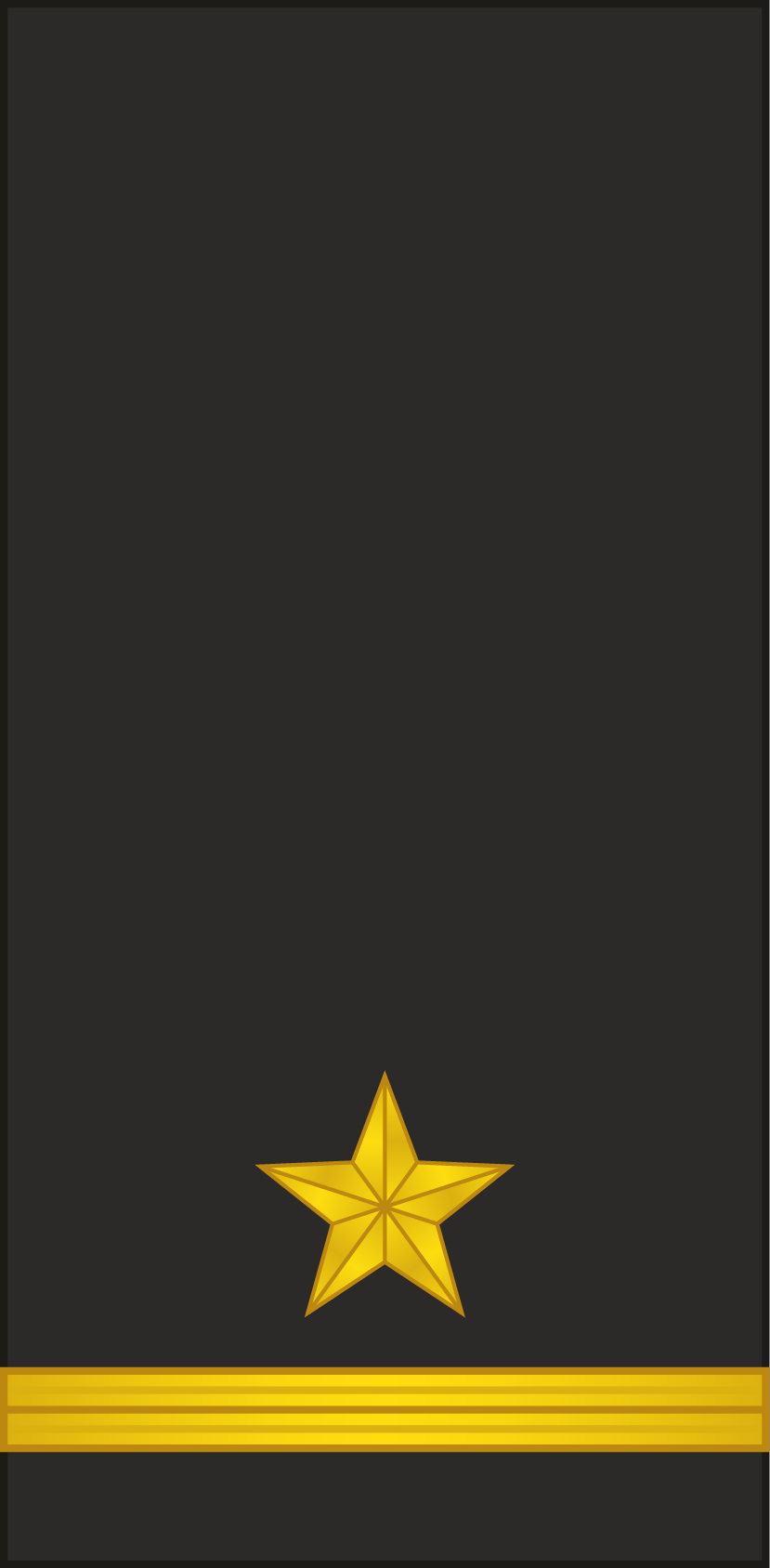
| Rank group | General / flag officers | | | Senior officers | | | | Junior officers |
|---|---|---|---|---|---|---|---|---|---|---|
| PLA Navy |
| PLA Navy | 海军上将; Hǎijūn shàngjiàng | 海军中将; Hǎijūn zhōngjiàng | 海军少将; Hǎijūn shàojiàng | 海军大校; Hǎijūn dàxiào | 海军上校; Hǎijūn shàngxiào | 海军中校; Hǎijūn zhōngxiào | 海军少校; Hǎijūn shàoxiào | 海军上尉; Hǎijūn shàngwèi | 海军中尉; Hǎijūn zhōngwèi | 海军少尉; Hǎijūn shàowèi |

=== Other ranks ===
The rank insignia of non-commissioned officers and enlisted personnel.

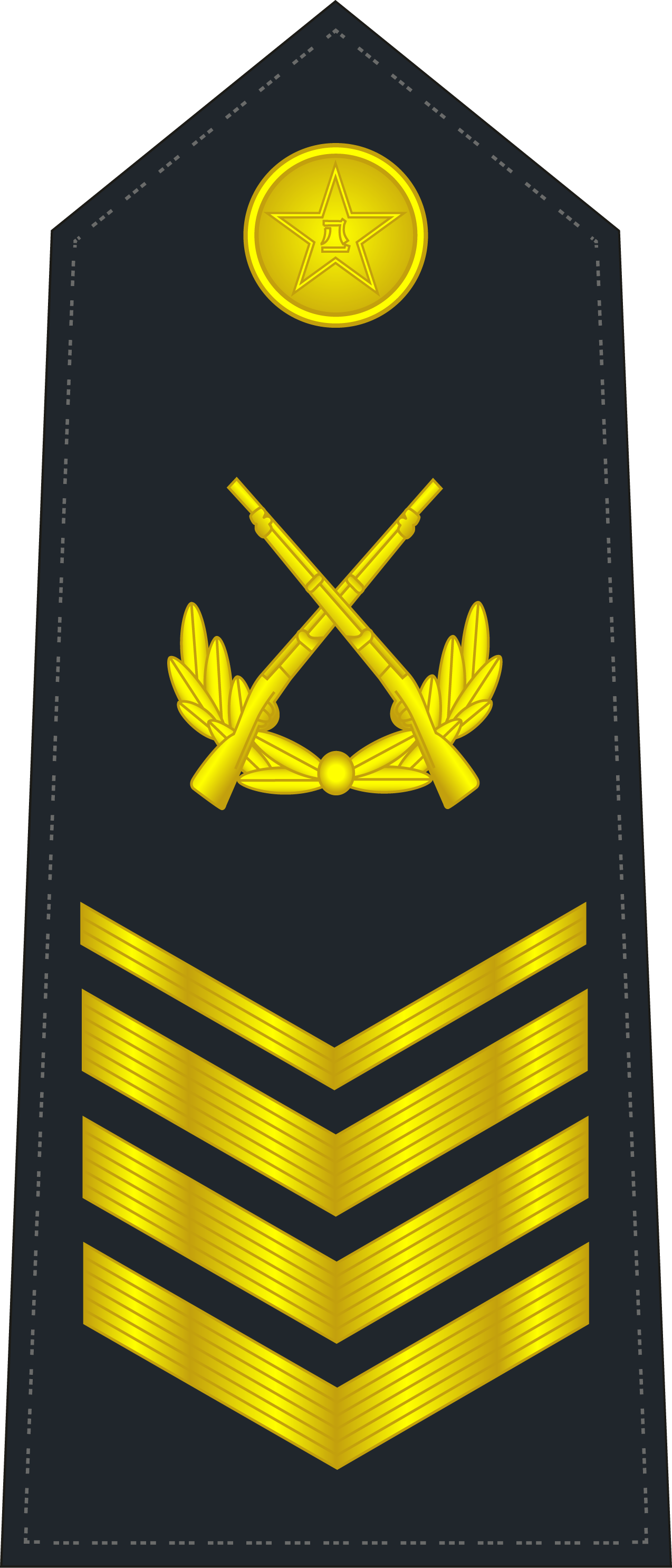
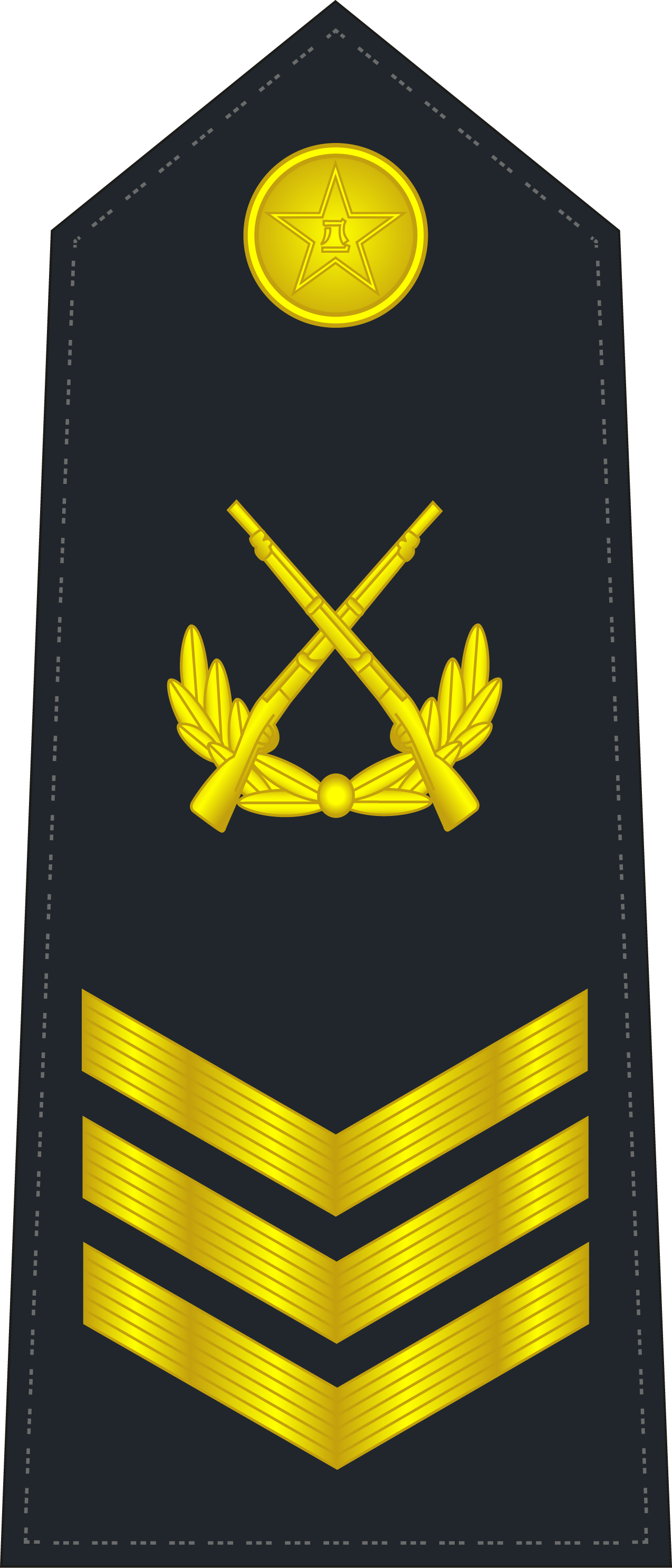
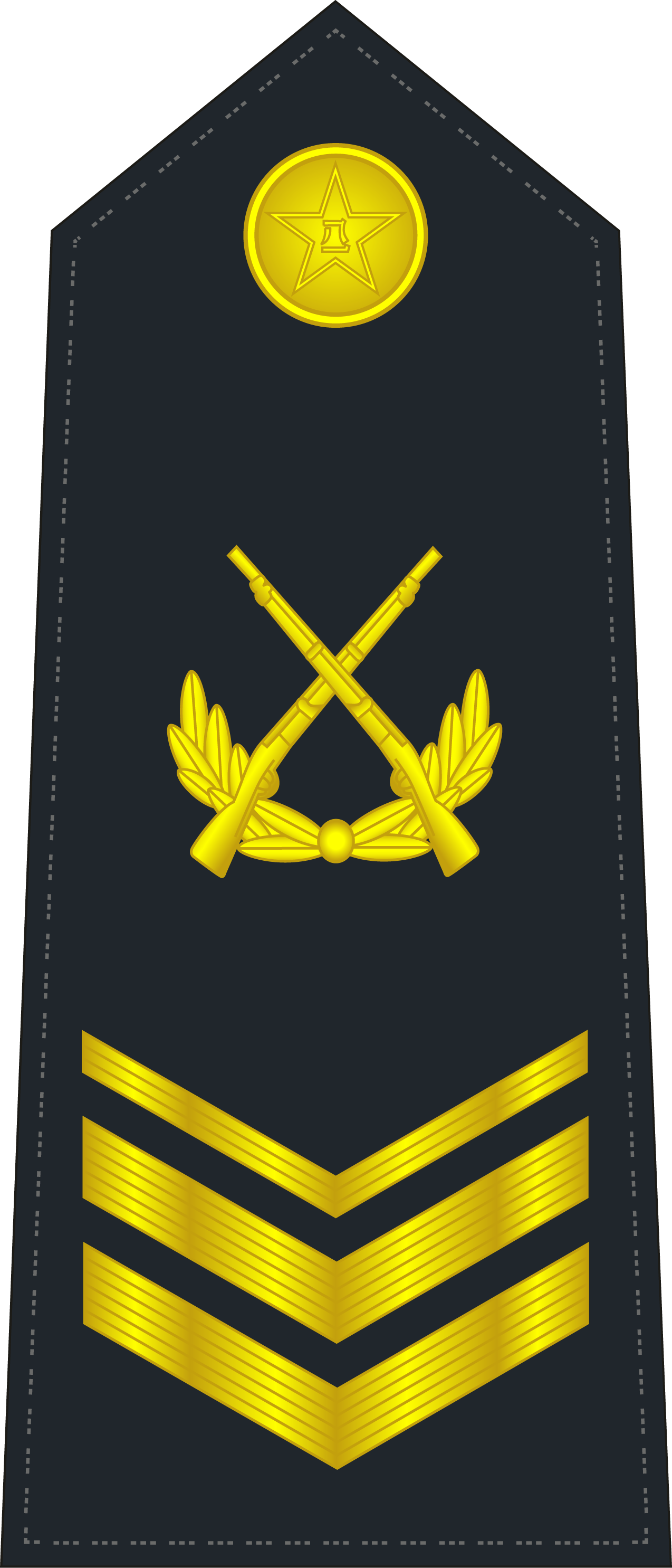
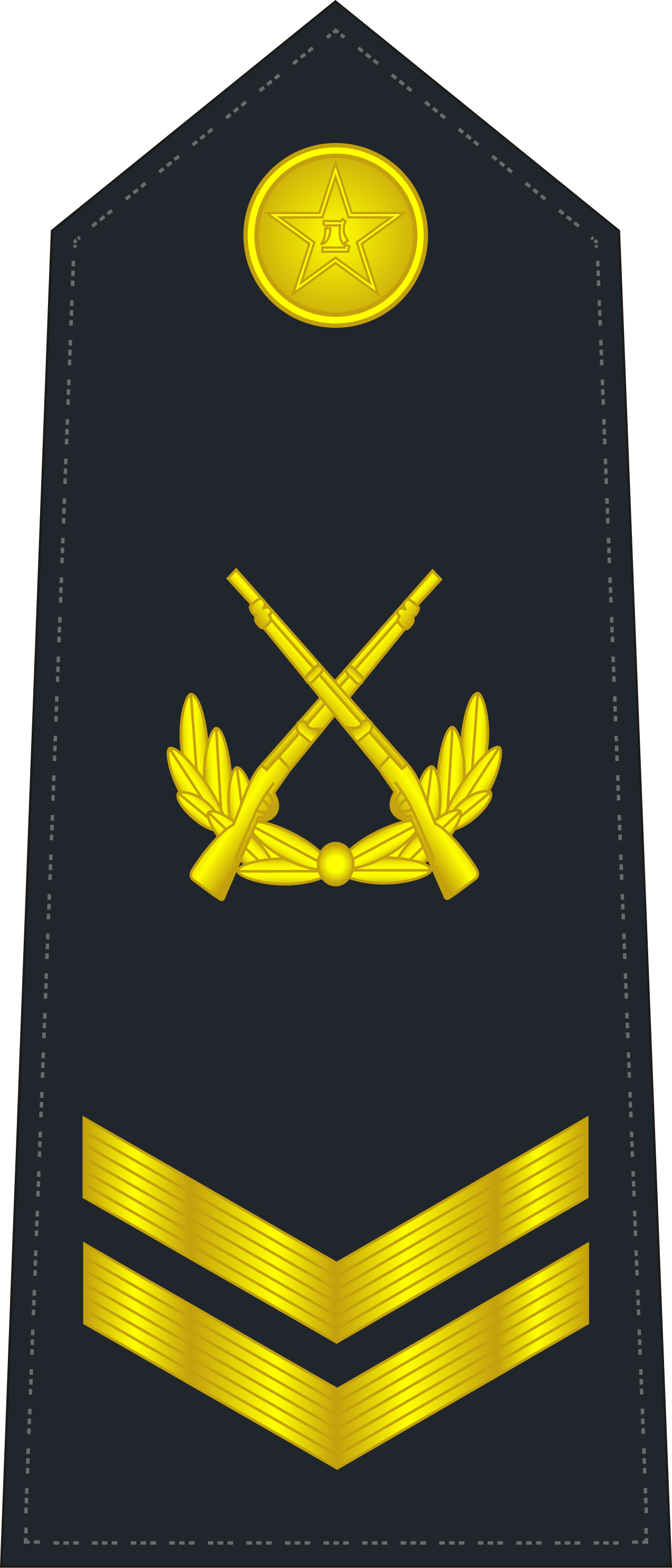
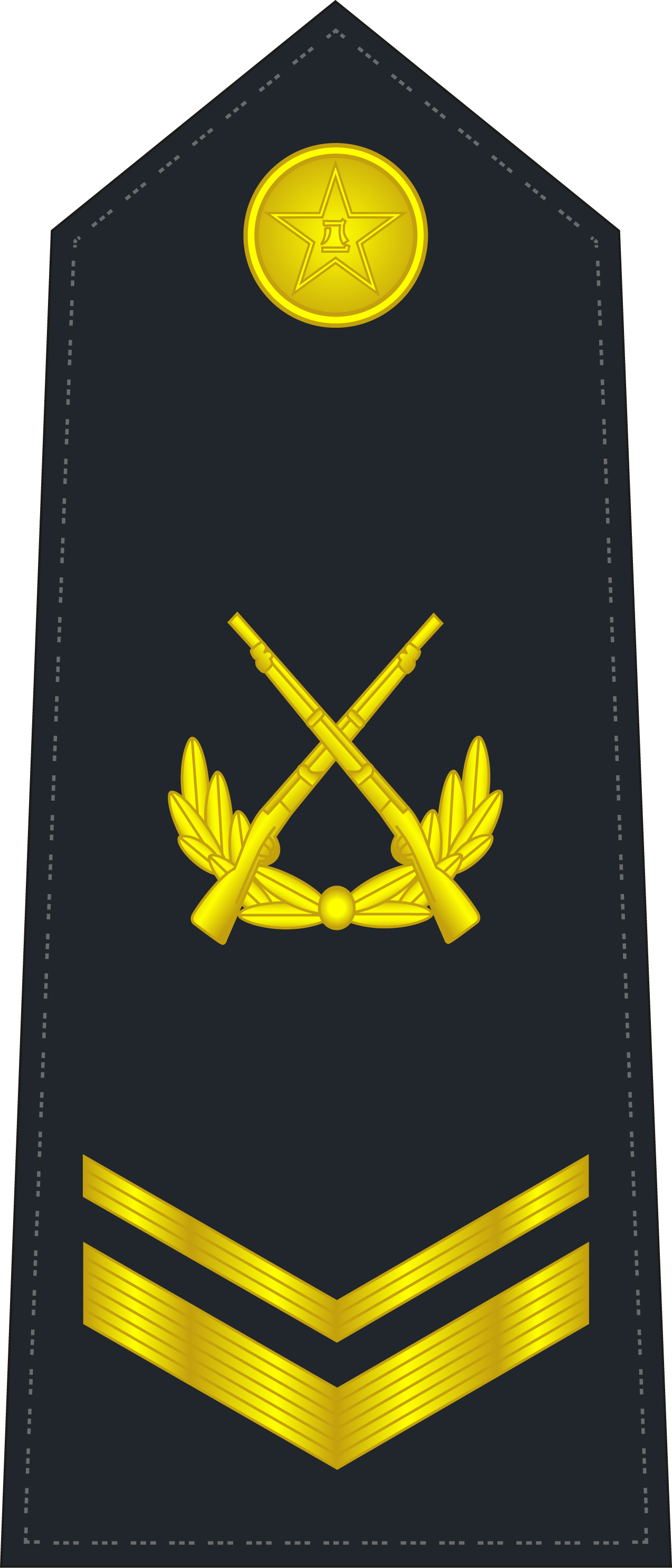
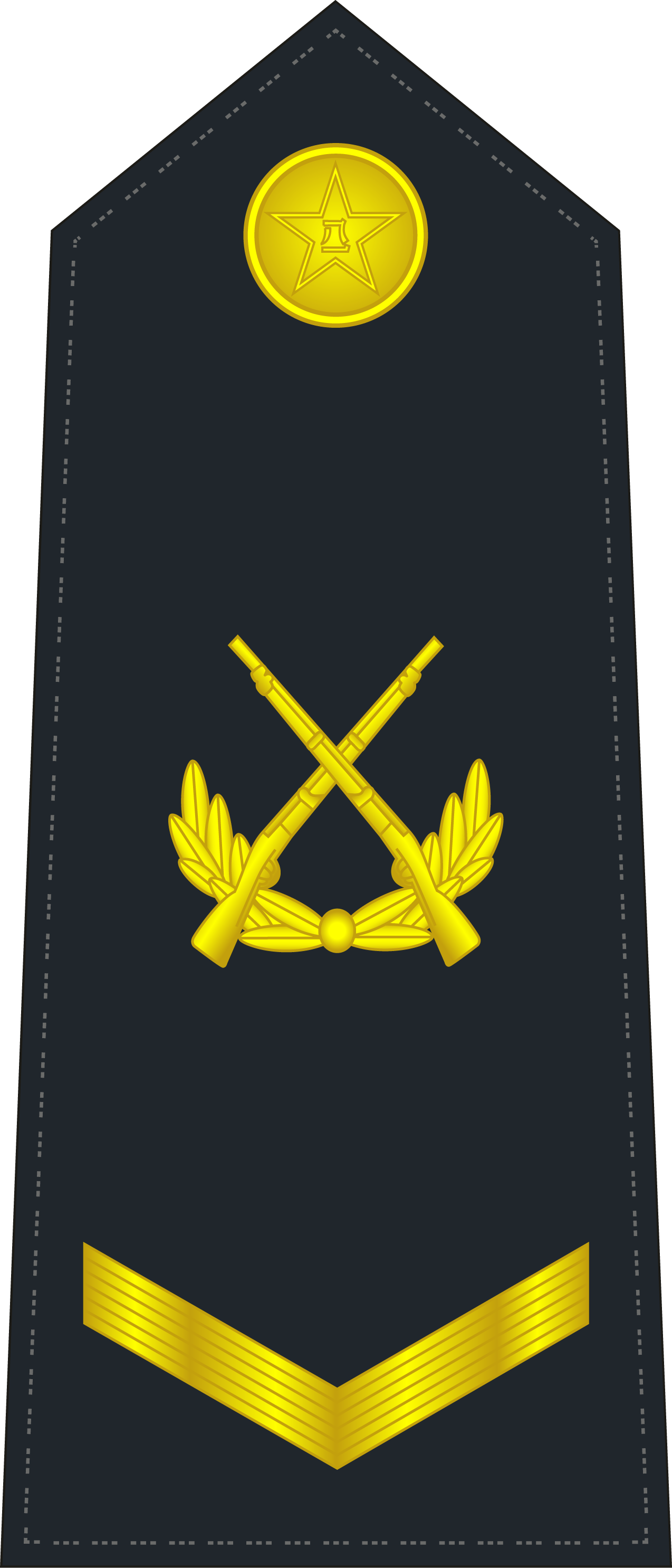
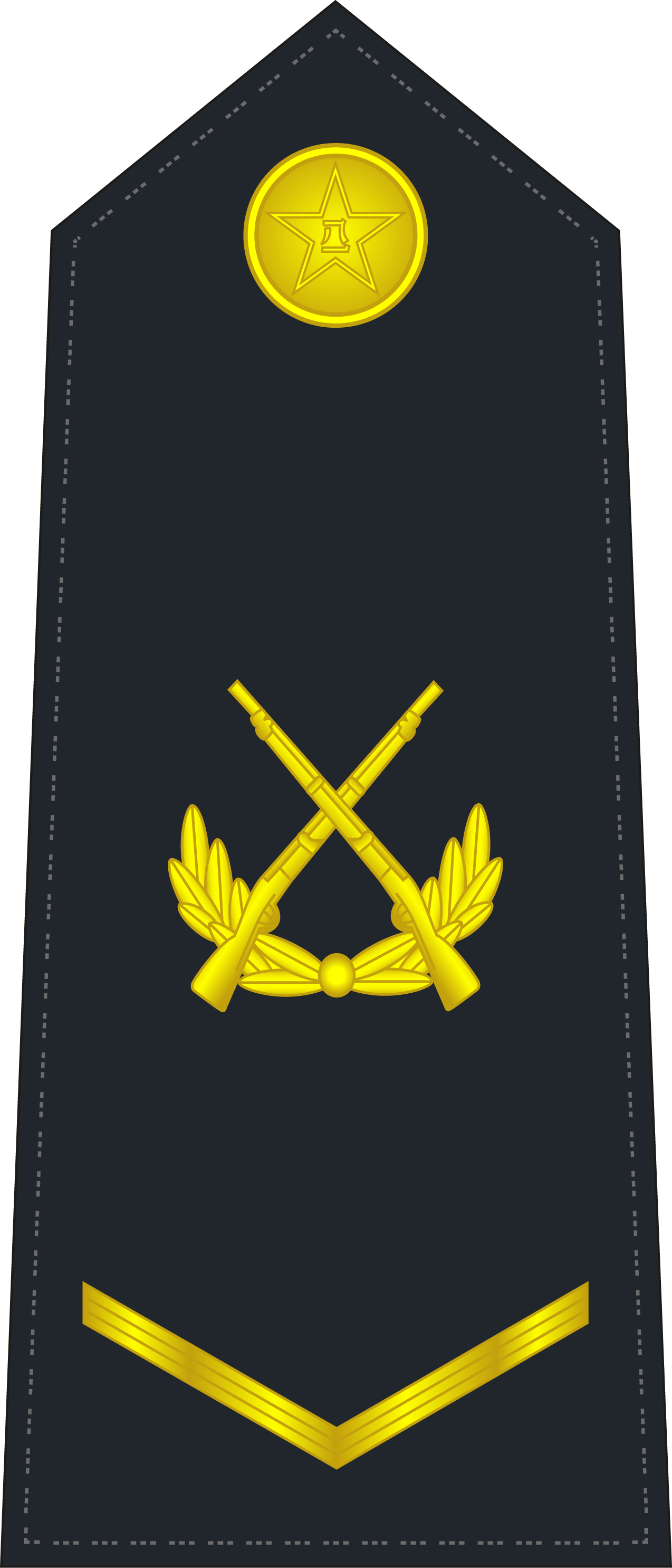
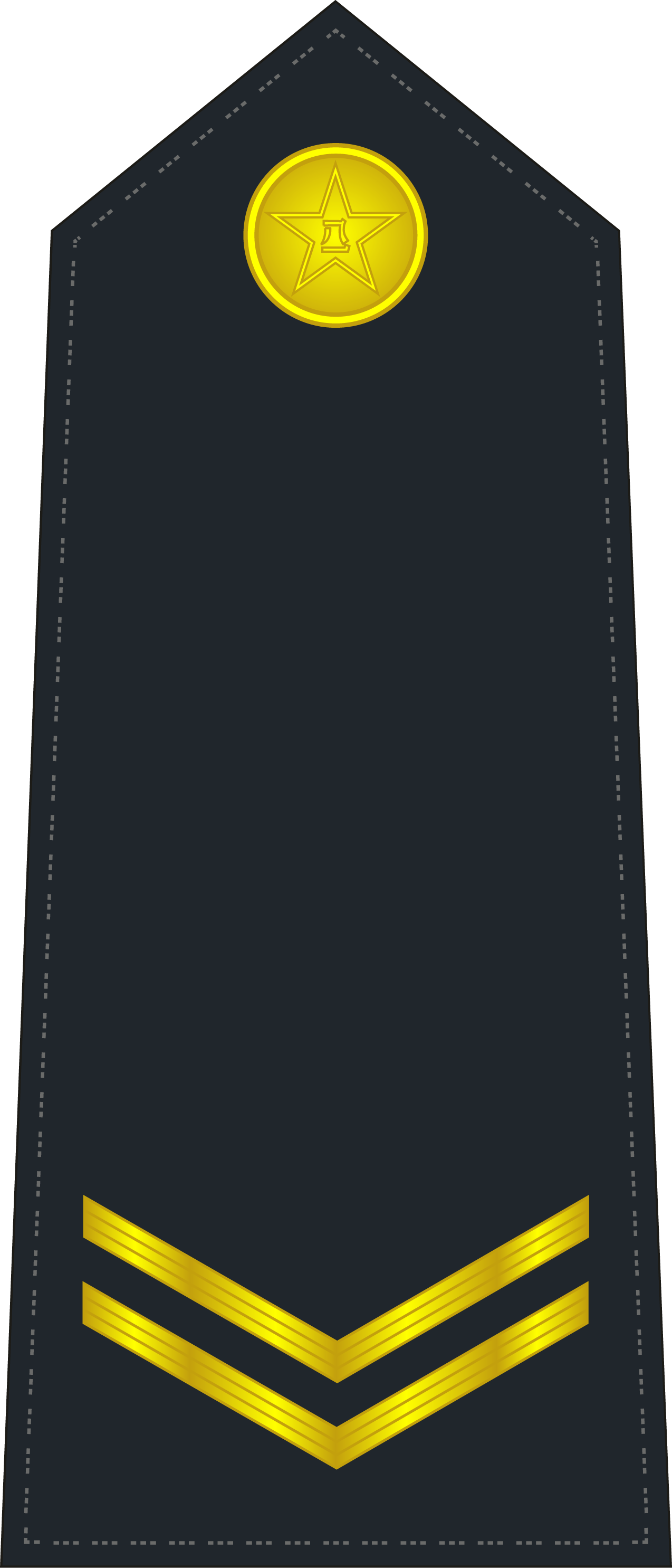
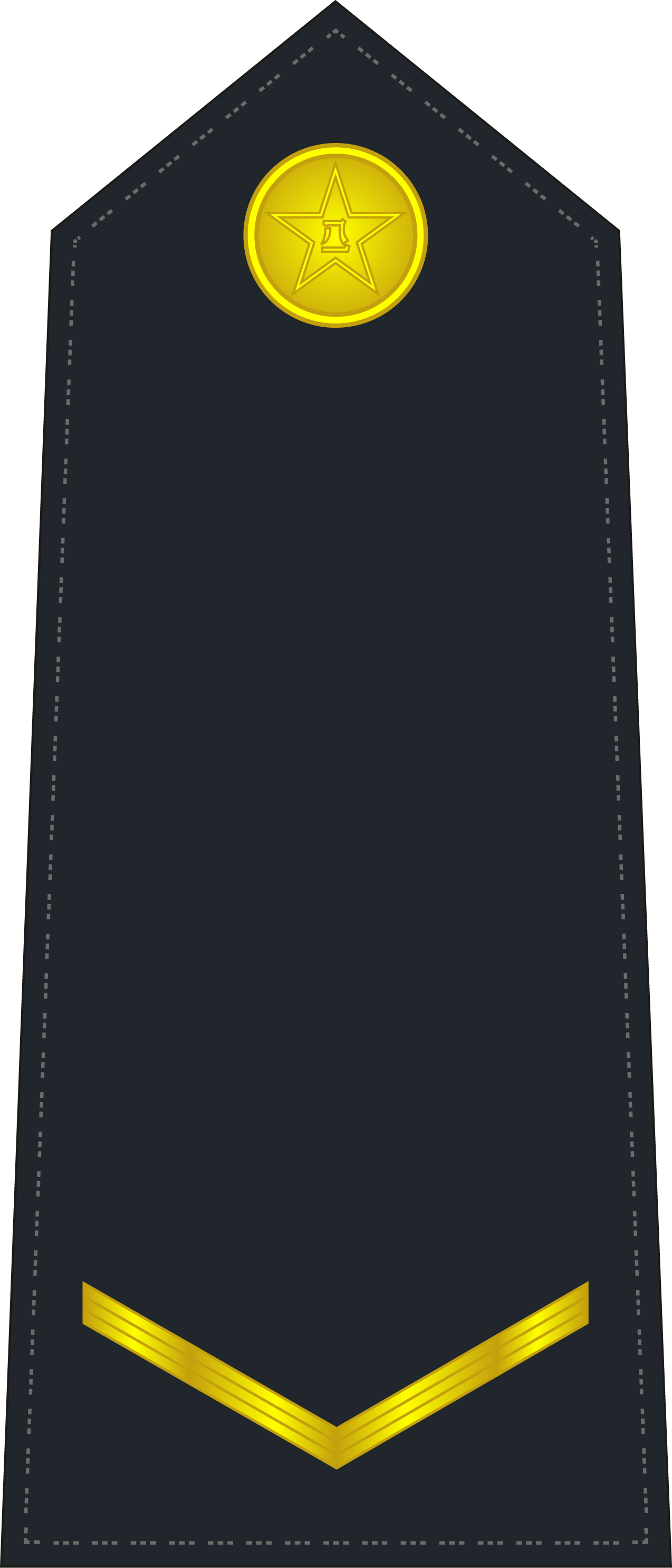
| Rank group | Senior NCOs | | | | | | Junior NCOs | Enlisted |
|---|---|---|---|---|---|---|---|---|---|
| PLA Navy |
| PLA Navy | 海军一级军士长; Hǎijūn yījí jūnshìzhǎng | 海军二级军士长; Hǎijūn èrjí jūnshìzhǎng | 海军三级军士长; Hǎijūn sānjí jūnshìzhǎng | 海军四级军士长; Hǎijūn sìjí jūnshìzhǎng | 海军上士; Hǎijūn shàngshì | 海军中士; Hǎijūn zhōngshì | 海军下士; Hǎijūn xiàshì | 海军上等兵; Hǎijūn shàngděngbīng | 海军列兵; Hǎijūn lièbīng |

== Commanders ==
- Xiao Jinguang (January 1950 − January 1980)
- Ye Fei (January 1980 – August 1982)
- Liu Huaqing (August 1982 – January 1988)
- Zhang Lianzhong (January 1988 – November 1996)
- Shi Yunsheng (November 1996 – June 2003)
- Zhang Dingfa (June 2003 – August 2006)
- Wu Shengli (August 2006 – January 2017)
- Shen Jinlong (January 2017 – September 2021)
- Dong Jun (September 2021 – December 2023)
- Hu Zhongming (December 2023–present)

== Political Commissars ==
- Su Zhenhua (February 1957 - January 1967)
- Li Zuopeng (May 1967 - September 1971)
- Su Zhenhua (March 1973 - February 1979)
- Ye Fei (February 1979 - January 1980)
- Li Yaowen (October 1980 - April 1990)
- Wei Jinshan (April 1990 - December 1993)
- Zhou Kunren (December 1993 - July 1995)
- Yang Huaiqing (July 1995 - June 2003)
- Hu Yanlin (June 2003 - July 2008)
- Liu Xiaojiang (July 2008 - December 2014)
- Miao Hua (December 2014 - August 2017)
- Qin Shengxiang (August 2017 - January 2022)
- Yuan Huazhi (January 2022 - October 2025)

== Contemporary topics ==
=== Strategy, plans, priorities ===
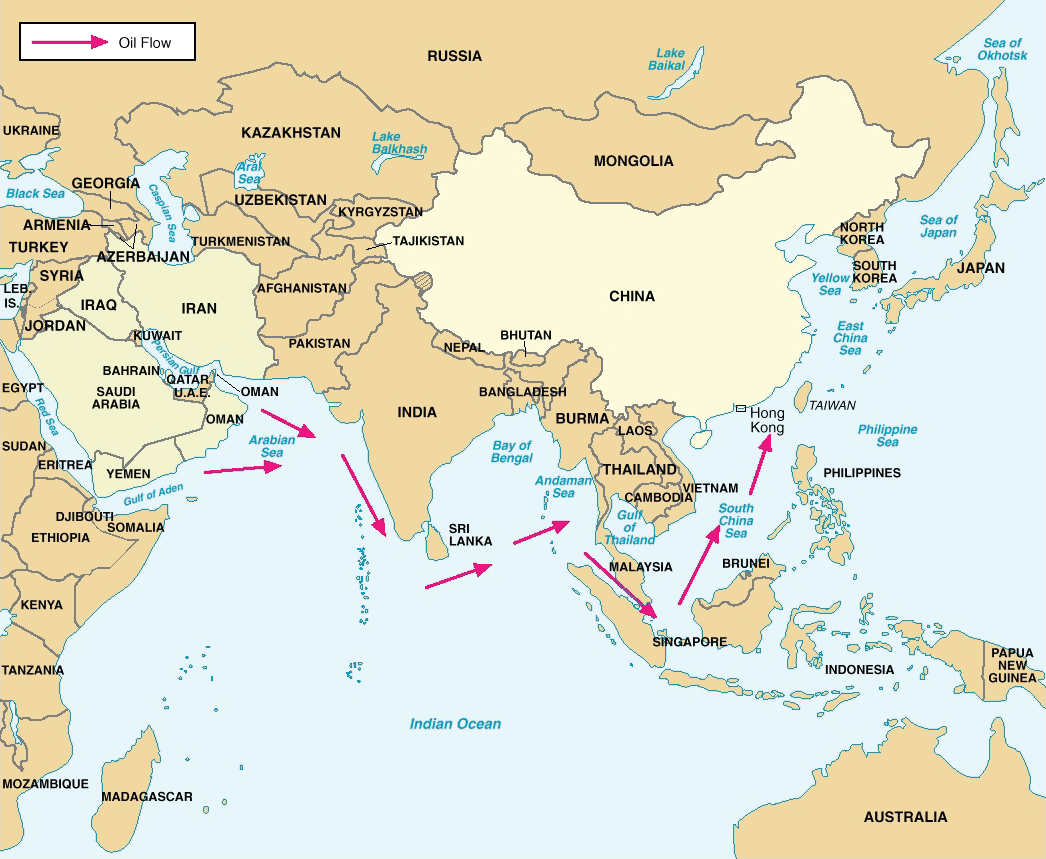
China's critical sea lines of communication. In 2004, over 80 percent of Chinese crude oil imports transited the Straits of Malacca, with less than 2 percent transiting the Straits of Lombok.

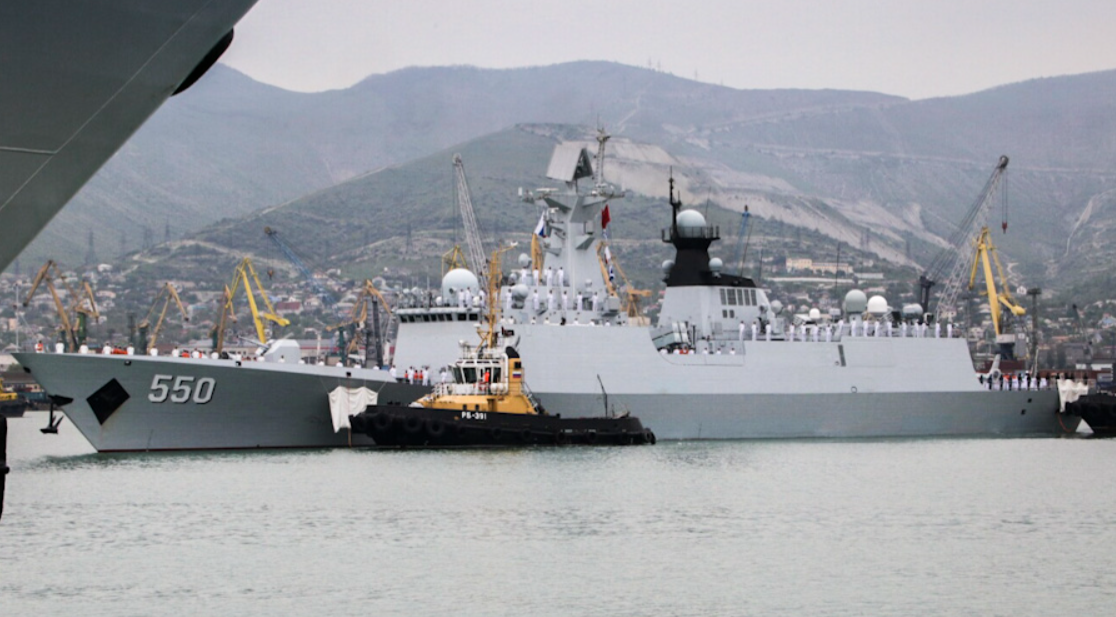
Frigate "Weifang" (China)

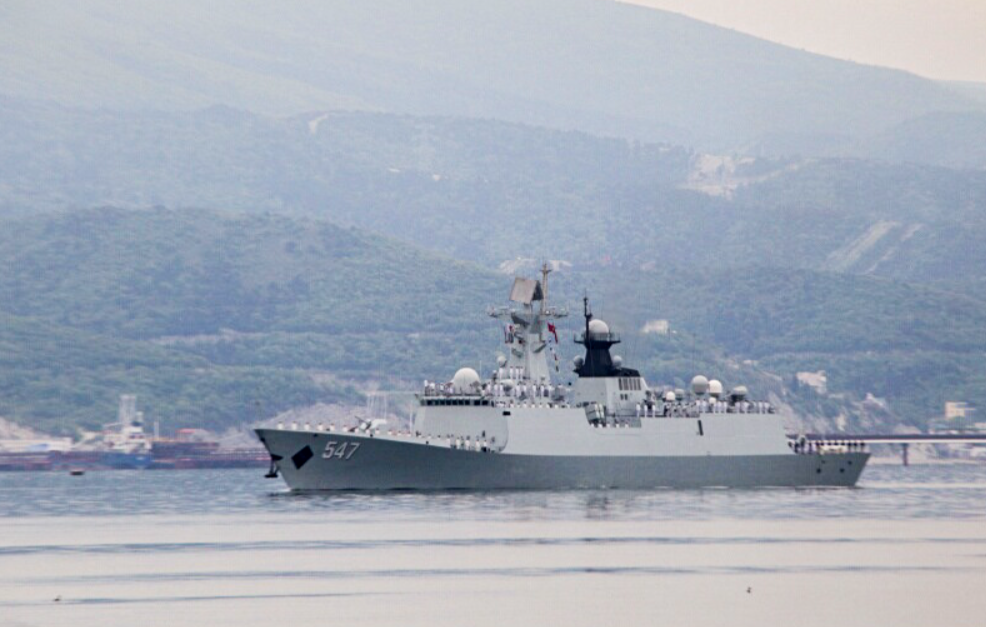
Frigate "Linyi" (China)

The People's Liberation Army Navy has become more prominent in recent years owing to a change in Chinese strategic priorities. The new strategic threats include possible conflict with the United States and/or a resurgent Japan in areas such as the Taiwan Strait or the South China Sea. As part of its overall program of naval modernization, the PLAN has a long-term plan of developing a blue water navy. Robert D. Kaplan has said that it was the collapse of the Soviet Union that allowed China to transfer resources from its army to its navy and other force projection assets.

China is constructing a major underground nuclear submarine base near Sanya, Hainan. In December 2007 the first Type 094 submarine was moved to Sanya. The Daily Telegraph on 1 May 2008 reported that tunnels were being built into hillsides which could be capable of hiding up to 20 nuclear submarines from spy satellites. According to the Western news media the base is reportedly to help China project seapower well into the Pacific Ocean area, including challenging United States naval power.

During a 2008 interview with the BBC, Major General Qian Lihua, a senior Chinese defence official, stated that the PLAN aspired to possess a small number of aircraft carriers to allow it to expand China's air defence perimeter. According to Qian the important issue was not whether China had an aircraft carrier, but what it did with it. On 13 January 2009, Adm. Robert F. Willard, head of the U.S. Pacific Command, called the PLAN's modernization "aggressive," and that it raised concerns in the region. On 15 July 2009, Senator Jim Webb of the Senate Foreign Relations Committee declared that only the "United States has both the stature and the national power to confront the obvious imbalance of power that China brings" to situations such as the claims to the Spratly and Paracel islands.

Ronald O'Rourke of the Congressional Research Service wrote in 2009 that the PLAN "continues to exhibit limitations or weaknesses in several areas, including capabilities for sustained operations by larger formations in distant waters, joint operations with other parts of China’s military, C4ISR systems, anti-air warfare (AAW), antisubmarine warfare (ASW), MCM, and a dependence on foreign suppliers for certain key ship components."

In 1998 China purchased the discarded Ukrainian ship Varyag and began retrofitting it for naval deployment. On 25 September 2012, the People's Liberation Army Navy took delivery of China's first aircraft carrier, Liaoning. The 60,000-ton ship can accommodate 33 fixed wing aircraft. It is widely speculated that these aircraft will be the J15 fighter (the Chinese version of Russia's SU-33).

In September 2015, satellite images showed that China may have started constructing its first indigenous Type 002 aircraft carrier. At the time, the layout suggested to be displacement of 50,000 tons and a hull to have a length of about 240 m and a beam of about 35 m. On 28 April 2017 the carrier was launched as Shandong.

Japan has raised concerns about the PLAN's growing capability and the lack of transparency as its naval strength keeps on expanding. China has entered into service the world's first anti-ship ballistic missile called DF-21D. The potential threat from the DF-21D against U.S. aircraft carriers has reportedly caused major changes in U.S. strategy.

On 28 June 2017 China launched the first of a new type of large destroyer, the Type 055 destroyer. The destroyer – the Nanchang – is, with its length of 180 m and at over 12,000 tons fully loaded, the second largest destroyer class in the world after the American Zumwalt-class destroyer. By 2025, at least ten destroyers to this design (rated by the United States Navy as "cruisers") have been built and more are under construction.

As of 2025, the PLAN's six Type 094 submarines are assigned 72 warheads on JL-3 ballistic missiles, representing 12% of China's nuclear stockpile. It is unclear how many if any nuclear warheads are actively deployed on submarines, or held in storage on land. China plans to upgrade this sea leg of its nuclear triad with the Type 096 submarine.

=== Comparison to US Navy ===
As of 2024, the PLAN is the second-largest navy in the world by total displacement tonnage — at 2 million tons in 2024, behind only the United States Navy (USN) — and the largest navy globally by number of active sea-going ships (excluding coastal missile boats, gunboats and minesweepers) with over 370 surface ships and submarines in service, compared to approximately 292 ships and submarines in the USN. However, the Chinese fleets are much newer and smaller in tonnage, as about 70% of their warships were launched after 2010 and consist mostly of newly designed destroyers, frigates and corvettes with only a few amphibious warfare ships and the three commissioned aircraft carriers, while only about 25% of the American ships were launched after 2010 and majority of their tonnage are from its eleven 100,000-ton supercarriers, 21 large amphibious assault ships and experimental capital ships such as the Zumwalt-class destroyers. The dominance of Chinese shipbuilding capacity (over 232 times greater tonnage than the United States, according to the Alliance for American Manufacturing) have led the Office of Naval Intelligence to project that China will have 475 battle force ships by 2035, while the USN will have 305 to 317, which would put the United States in a numerical and operational disadvantage especially in the West Pacific according to a chair naval strategy professor at the Naval War College. Additionally, in December 2025 the US Department of Defense stated that China was planning to construct 6 Type 004 carriers by 2035, resulting in a total PLAN fleet of 9 aircraft carriers that would outnumber the 6 carriers currently deployed in the US Pacific Fleet.

A 2019 review found the USN fleet was able to deploy more "battle force missiles" (BFMs), defined as those missiles that contribute to battle missions, than the PLAN: USN fleet could deploy 11,000 BFMs, compared to 5250 BFMs for PLAN and 3326 BFMs for the Russian Navy.

=== Territorial disputes ===
Maritime claims in the South China Sea

==== Spratly Islands dispute ====
The Spratly Islands dispute is a territorial dispute over the ownership of the Spratly Islands, a group of islands located in the South China Sea. States staking claims to various islands are Brunei, Malaysia, the Philippines, Taiwan, Vietnam, and People's Republic of China. All except Brunei occupy some of the islands in dispute.

On 14 March 1988, Chinese and Vietnamese naval forces clashed over Johnson South Reef in the Spratly Islands, which involved three PLAN frigates.

In February 2011, the Chinese frigate Dongguan fired three shots at Philippine fishing boats in the vicinity of Jackson Atoll. The shots were fired after the frigate instructed the fishing boats to leave, and one of those boats experienced trouble removing its anchor.

==== Diaoyu Islands dispute ====
The Diaoyu Islands dispute concerns a territorial dispute over a group of uninhabited islands known as the Diaoyu Islands in China, the Senkaku Islands in Japan, and Tiaoyutai Islands in Taiwan. Aside from a 1945 to 1972 period of administration by the United States, the archipelago has been controlled by Japan since 1895. The People's Republic of China disputed the proposed U.S. handover of authority to Japan in 1971 and has asserted its claims to the islands since that time. Taiwan also has claimed these islands. The disputed territory is close to key shipping lanes and rich fishing grounds, and it may have major oil reserves in the area.

On some occasions, ships and planes from various mainland Chinese and Taiwanese government and military agencies have entered the disputed area. In addition to the cases where they escorted fishing and activist vessels, there have been other incursions. In an eight-month period in 2012, over forty maritime incursions and 160 aerial incursions occurred. For example, in July 2012, three Chinese patrol vessels entered the disputed waters around the islands.

Military escalation continued in 2013. In February, Japanese Defense Minister Itsunori Onodera claimed that a Chinese frigate had locked weapons-targeting radar onto a Japanese destroyer and helicopter on two occasions in January. A Chinese Jiangwei II class frigate and a Japanese destroyer were three kilometres apart, and the crew of the latter vessel went to battle stations. The Chinese state media responded that their frigates had been engaged in routine training at the time.

==== Other incidents ====
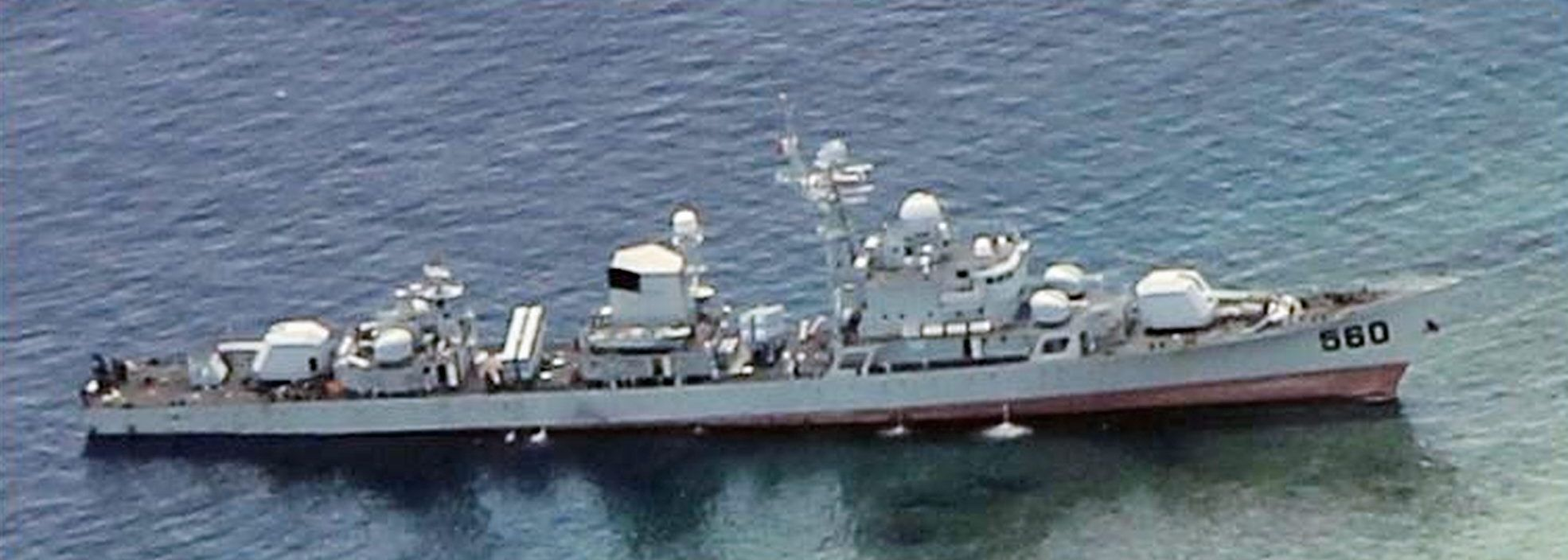
Dongguan aground on the Half Moon Shoal, 22 July 2011

During the 1974 Battle of the Paracel Islands, China, which previously controlled some Paracel Islands, defeated South Vietnam, coming to control the entire achipelago. According to the United States Naval Institute, it is one of the PLAN's most significant naval battles and amphibious operations, with lessons for future Taiwan and South China Sea operations, and is touted in China as the country's first victory against what it considers a foreign navy (i.e. not part of the Civil War or Taiwan Strait Crises).

On 22 July 2011, following its Vietnam port-call, the Indian amphibious assault vessel Airavat was reportedly contacted 45 nautical miles from the Vietnamese coast in the disputed South China Sea by a party identifying itself as the Chinese Navy and stating that the Indian warship was entering Chinese waters. According to a spokesperson for the Indian Navy, since there were no Chinese ships or aircraft were visible, the INS Airavat proceeded on her onward journey as scheduled. The Indian Navy further clarified that "[t]here was no confrontation involving the INS Airavat. India supports freedom of navigation in international waters, including in the South China Sea, and the right of passage in accordance with accepted principles of international law. These principles should be respected by all."

On 11 July 2012, the Chinese frigate Dongguan ran aground on Hasa Hasa Shoal (pictured) located 60 nmi west of Rizal, which was within the Philippines' 200 nmi-EEZ. By 15 July, the frigate had been refloated and was returning to port with no injuries and only minor damage. During this incident, the 2012 ASEAN summit took place in Phnom Penh, Cambodia, amid the rising regional tensions.

=== Anti-piracy operations in the Gulf of Aden ===
On 18 December 2008, Chinese authorities deployed People's Liberation Army Navy vessels to escort Chinese shipping in the Gulf of Aden.

=== 2011 Libyan Civil War ===
In the lead-up to the 2011 Libyan Civil War, the Xuzhou (530) was deployed from anti-piracy operations in the Gulf of Aden to help evacuate Chinese nationals from Libya.

=== Yemen conflict ===
During the Yemen conflict, in 2015, the Chinese Navy diverted frigates carrying out anti-piracy operations in Somalia to evacuate at least 600 Chinese and 225 foreign citizens working in Yemen. Among the non-Chinese evacuees were 176 Pakistani citizens, with smaller numbers from other countries, such as Ethiopia, Singapore, the UK, Italy, and Germany. Despite the evacuations, the Chinese embassy in Yemen continued to operate.

=== Ream Naval Base ===
In July 2019, US officials stated that they had seen a secret agreement that would allow the People's Liberation Army Navy exclusive access to about one-third of the Ream naval base for up to 30 years. This would give Beijing a new base near the South China Sea.

The existence of the agreement was denied by Cambodian authorities who called it "fake news". They said that the base is Cambodian, not Chinese, and that foreign military presence there is rotational and not permanent, in compliance with the country's constitution. In 2021 the Cambodian defence minister stated that China was helping build infrastructure at Ream and there were no strings attached.

== Equipment ==
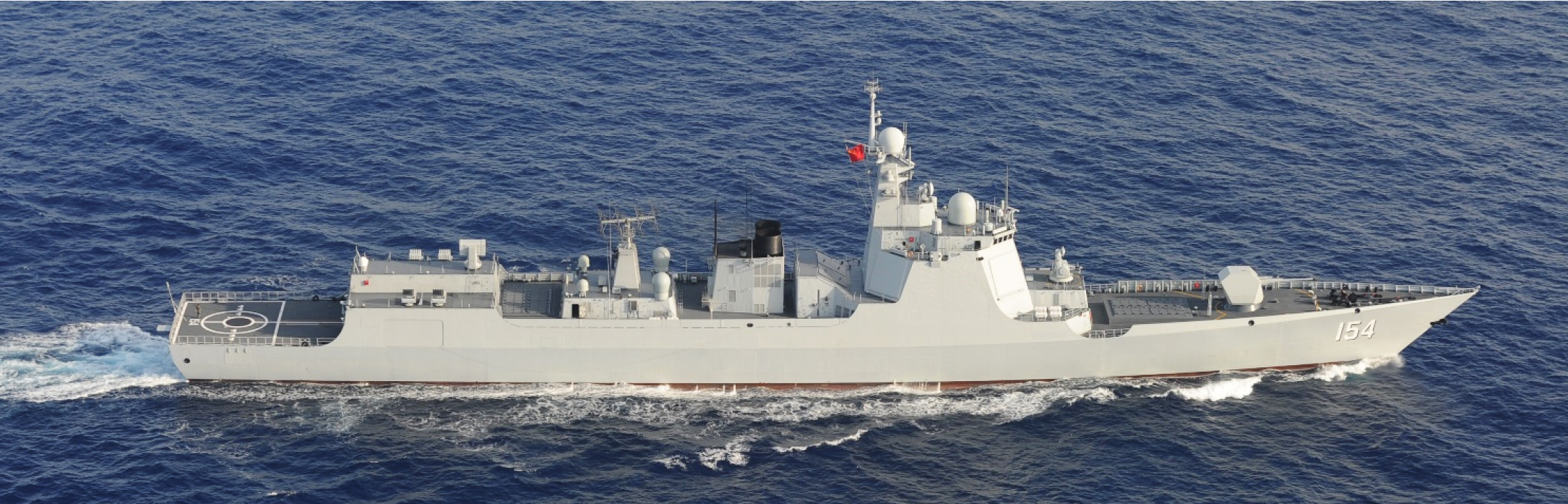
Destroyer Xiamen

China's navy is the second-largest in the world in terms of tonnage.

=== Ships and submarines ===
As of 2024, the navy has an overall battle force of more than 350 ships and submarines. Ships are named according to the Naval Vessels Naming Regulation.

=== Aircraft ===
The Chinese Navy operates both airfield- and carrier-based fixed-wing aircraft, as well as helicopters for battlefield logistics, reconnaissance, patrol and medical evacuation.

=== Naval weaponry ===
The QBS-06 is an underwater assault rifle with 5.8×42 DBS-06. It is based on the Soviet APS.

In early February 2018, pictures of what is claimed to be a Chinese railgun were published online. In pictures the gun is shown mounted on the bow of a Type 072III-class landing ship Haiyangshan. In March 2018, it was reported that China had claimed to have begun testing its electromagnetic rail gun at sea.

== Future of the People's Liberation Army Navy ==
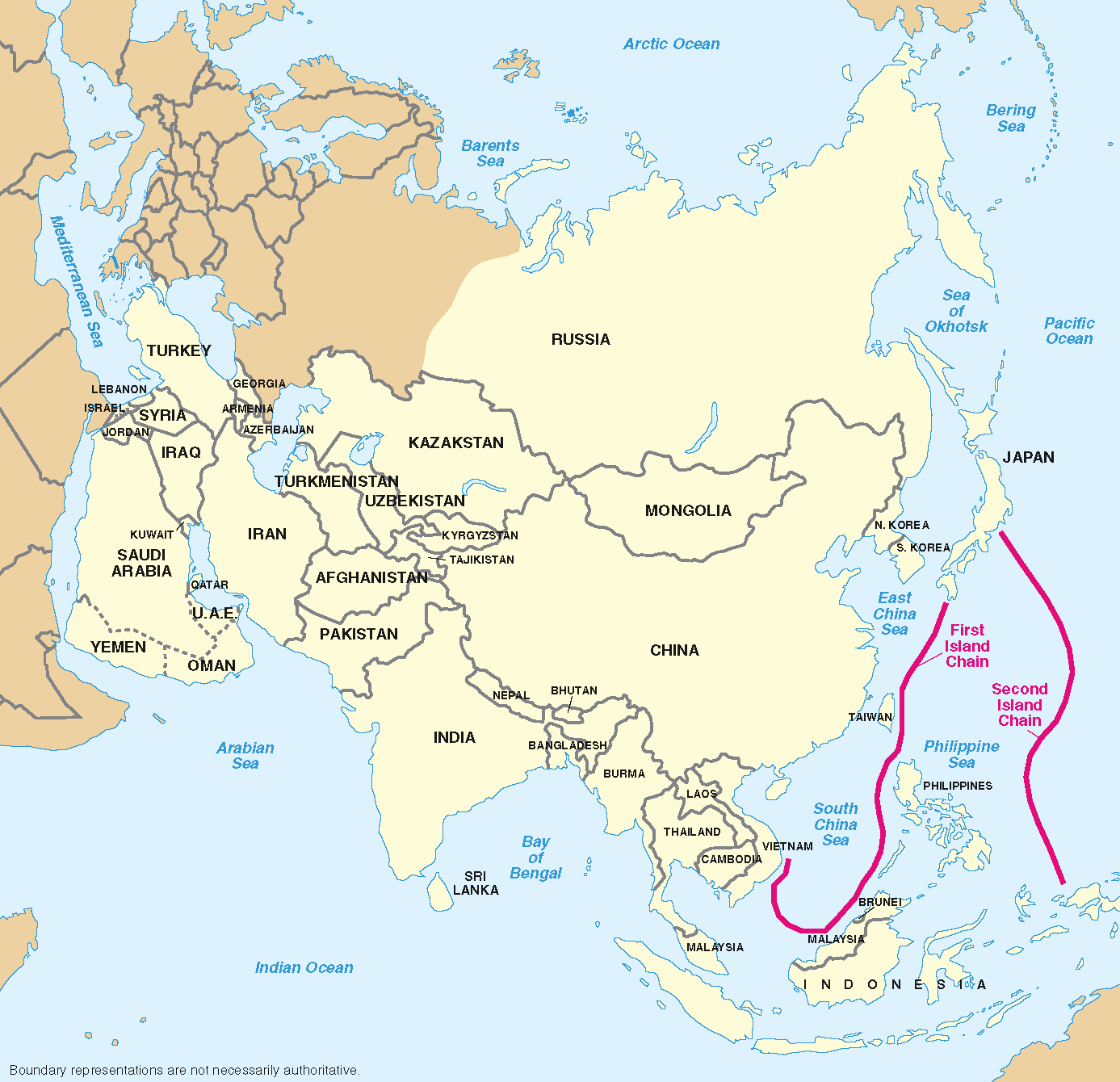
Geographic boundaries of the First and Second Island Chains

The PLAN's ambitions include operating out to the first and second island chains, as far as the South Pacific near Australia, and spanning to the Aleutian islands, and operations extending to the Straits of Malacca near the Indian Ocean.

Between 2001 and 2006 there was a rapid building and acquisition program, a trend which continued. There were more than a dozen new classes of ships built in those five years, totalling some 60 brand new ships (including landing ships and auxiliaries). Simultaneously, dozens of other ships have been either phased out of service or refitted with new equipment.

Ronald O'Rourke of the Congressional Research Service reported that the long-term goals of PLAN planning include:

- Assert or defend China's claims in maritime territorial disputes and China's interpretation of international laws relating to freedom of navigation in exclusive economic zones (an interpretation at odds with the U.S. interpretation);
- Protect China's sea lines of communications to the Persian Gulf, on which China relies for some of its energy imports.

Following the construction of its two smaller aircraft carriers, China began building the Type 003 carrier. In the near term, the PLAN intends to put together four aircraft carrier strike groups and four expeditionary strike groups. The U.S. Defense Department published a report in December 2025 which claimed that China intends to build six carriers over the next decade, to have nine carrier strike groups by 2035.

The PLAN may also operate from Gwadar or Seychelles for anti-piracy missions and to protect vital trade routes which may endanger China's energy security in the case of a conflict. In 2016, China established her first overseas naval base in Djibouti.

== See also ==
- Chinese aircraft carrier programme
- China Coast Guard
- Dalian Naval Academy
- List of ships of the People's Liberation Army Navy
- People's Liberation Army Navy Band
- Political Commissar of the People's Liberation Army Navy
- Political Department of the People's Liberation Army Navy
