= Haiyang Mountains =

Mountain range in Guangxi, China

The Haiyang Mountains (Chinese: 海洋山 or 海阳山; pinyin: hǎiyáng shān), in ancient times known as "Yanghai Mountains" (Chinese: 阳海山; pinyin: yánghǎi shān) form a mountain range in the northeastern Guangxi separating West River drainage basin of the Xi River from the Xiang River drainage basin of the Yangtze River. The mountain range is located between Yuecheng Mountains and Dupang Mountains of Nanling Mountain Range, it is a major mountain range in Guilin, Guanxi, China. It runs south to north through Guanyang, Quanzhou, Xing'an, Lingchuan, Gongcheng and Yangshuo six counties. With a width of 35 kilometres (22 mi) to 40 kilometres (25 mi), the Haiyang Mountains stretch more than 97 kilometres (60 mi) from Yangshuo to Quanzhou. The highest peak is Baogai Hill (宝界岭) with an elevation of 1,935.8 metres (6,351 ft).

The Xianggui Corridor situated between Yuecheng and Haiyang Mountains has since always been the most important route from Central China to Guangxi, It is a valley which is high about 200 metres (660 ft) to 300 metres (980 ft) above sea level. Cutting through the Nanling Mountains, the Xianggui Corridor is the upper reaches of the Xiang and Li Rivers. The Left Branch of the upper Xiang River rises in the southwest of the Haiyang Mountains.
