= Xianggui Corridor =

Landform in Guangxi, China

- Chinese: 湘桂走廊
- Location: Northeast Guangxi
- Alternative name: Hunan-Guangxi Corridor

Xianggui Corridor or Xianggui Zoulang (Chinese: 湘桂走廊; pinyin: Xiāngguì zǒuláng), also known as Hunan-Guangxi Corridor, is a geographical corridor located between the Yuecheng Ridge (越城岭) in the northwest and the Dupang Ridge (都庞岭) in the southwest of Xing'an, Guangxi.

== Overview ==
Xianggui Corridor runs from northeast to southwest, is a canyon shaped like a corridor, has been a hot battleground contested by all strategists (兵家必争之地) since ancient times.

The main cities and counties that the Xianggui Corridor passes through are Quanzhou, Xing'an, Lingchuan, Guilin, Yongfu, etc. It has been the main traffic route from the Central Plains to Lingnan since ancient times.
