= Structure of the People's Liberation Army Navy =

Structure of naval branch of Chinese PLA

The People's Liberation Army Navy (PLAN) is the naval branch of the People's Liberation Army (PLA). The PLAN force consists of about 250,000 men and over a hundred major combat vessels, organized into three fleets: the North Sea Fleet, the East Sea Fleet, and the South Sea Fleet. Below is the organizational structure of the PLAN.

== PLAN headquarters ==
PLAN headquarters is subordinate to the PLA General Staff Department and the Chairman of the Central Military Committee .

Information current as of March 2007

- Commander-in-Chief of the Navy: Admiral Wu Shengli

Commander	Command Period
Wu Shengli	Aug 2006 – Present
Zhang Dingfa	Jun 2003 – Aug 2006
Shi Yunsheng	Nov 1996 – Jun 2003
Zhang Lianzhong	Jan 1988 – Jun 2003
Liu Huaqing	Aug 1982 – Jan 1988
Ye Fei	Jan 1980 – Aug 1982
Xiao Jinguang	Jan 1950 – Jan 1980

- Political Commissar of the Navy: Admiral Miao Hua

Political Commissar	Command Period
Miao Hua	December 2014 – Present
Liu Xiaojiang	Jul 2008 – December 2014
Hu Yanlin	Jun 2003 – Jul 2008
Yang Huaiqing	Jul 1995 – Jun 2003
Zhou Kunren	Dec 1993 – Jul 1995
Wei Jinshan	April 1990 – Dec 1993
Li Yaowen	Oct 1980 – April 1990
Ye Fei	Feb 1979 – Jan 1980
Du Yide	Oct 1977 – Dec 1978
Su Zhenhua	Sep 1971 – Sep 1977
Li Zuopeng	Jun 1967 – Sep 1971
Wang Hongkun	Mar 1966 – Jun 1967
Su Zhenhua	Feb 1957 – Feb 1966

Deputy Commanders:

- Ding Yiping
- Jin Mao
- Shen Binyi
- Wang Yucheng
- Zhang Yongyi
- Zhang Zhannan
- Zhao Xingfa
- Gu Wengen

Deputy Political Commissars:

- Kang Chengyuan
- Fan Yinhua
- Wu Huayang

Chief of Naval Staff: Ding Yiping
Director of Political Department: Xu Jianzhong

Fleet Commanders

- North Sea Fleet: Rear Admiral Tian Zhong; Political Commissar Li Guang
- East Sea Fleet: Vice Admiral Xu Hongmen; Political Commissar Xu Jianzhong
- South Sea Fleet: Vice Admiral Gu Wengen; Political Commissar Huang Jiaxiang

== Fleets ==
The People's Liberation Army Navy is divided into three fleets.

China PLA Navy Sea Fleets (2007)
Fleet	Status	Parent Command	Patrol Region	Headquarters	Flagship
North Sea Fleet (NSF; Chinese: 北海舰队)	Active	Northern Theater Command (Chinese: 北部战区)	Bohai Bay, Yellow Sea	Qingdao, Shandong Province	DDG 112 Harbin (Chinese: 哈尔滨), Type 052 Luhu-class Destroyer
East Sea Fleet (ESF; Chinese: 东海舰队)	Active	Eastern Theater Command (Chinese: 东部战区)	East China Sea	Ningbo, Zhejiang Province	DDG 150 Changchun (Chinese: 长春), Type 052C Luyang II-class Destroyer
South Sea Fleet (SSF; Chinese: 南海舰队)	Active	Southern Theater Command (Chinese: 南部战区)	South China Sea	Zhanjiang, Guangdong Province	AOR/AK Nanchang

== Bases ==
North Sea Fleet Major bases: Qingdao (HQ), Huludao, Jianggezhuang, Guzhen Bay, Lushun, Xiaopingdao.Yuchi Minor bases: Weihai Wei, Qingshan, Luda, Lianyungang, Ling Shan, Ta Ku Shan, Changshandao, Liuzhuang, Dayuanjiadun, Dalian

East Sea Fleet Major bases: Ningbo (HQ), Zhoushan, Shanghai, Daxie, Fujian. Minor bases: Zhenjiangguan, Wusong, Xinxiang, Wenzhou, Wenzhou SE, Sanduao, Xiamen, Xingxiang, Quandou, Wuhan, Dinghai, Jiaotou

South Sea Fleet Major bases: Zhanjiang (HQ), Yulin, Huangfu, Hong Kong, Guangzhou (Canton) . Minor bases: Haikou, Shantou, Humen, Kuanchuang, Tsun, Kuan Chung, Mawei, Beihai, Pingtan, San Chou Shih, Tang-Chiah Huan, Longmen, Bailong, Dongcun, Baimajing, Xiachuandao,

== Branches ==
The PLAN is organised into five branches:

1. People's Liberation Army Navy Surface Force
2. People's Liberation Army Navy Submarine Force
3. People's Liberation Army Navy Coastal Defense Force
4. People's Liberation Army Naval Air Force
5. People's Liberation Army Marine Corps
