= Courtesy call =

Formal diplomatic meeting

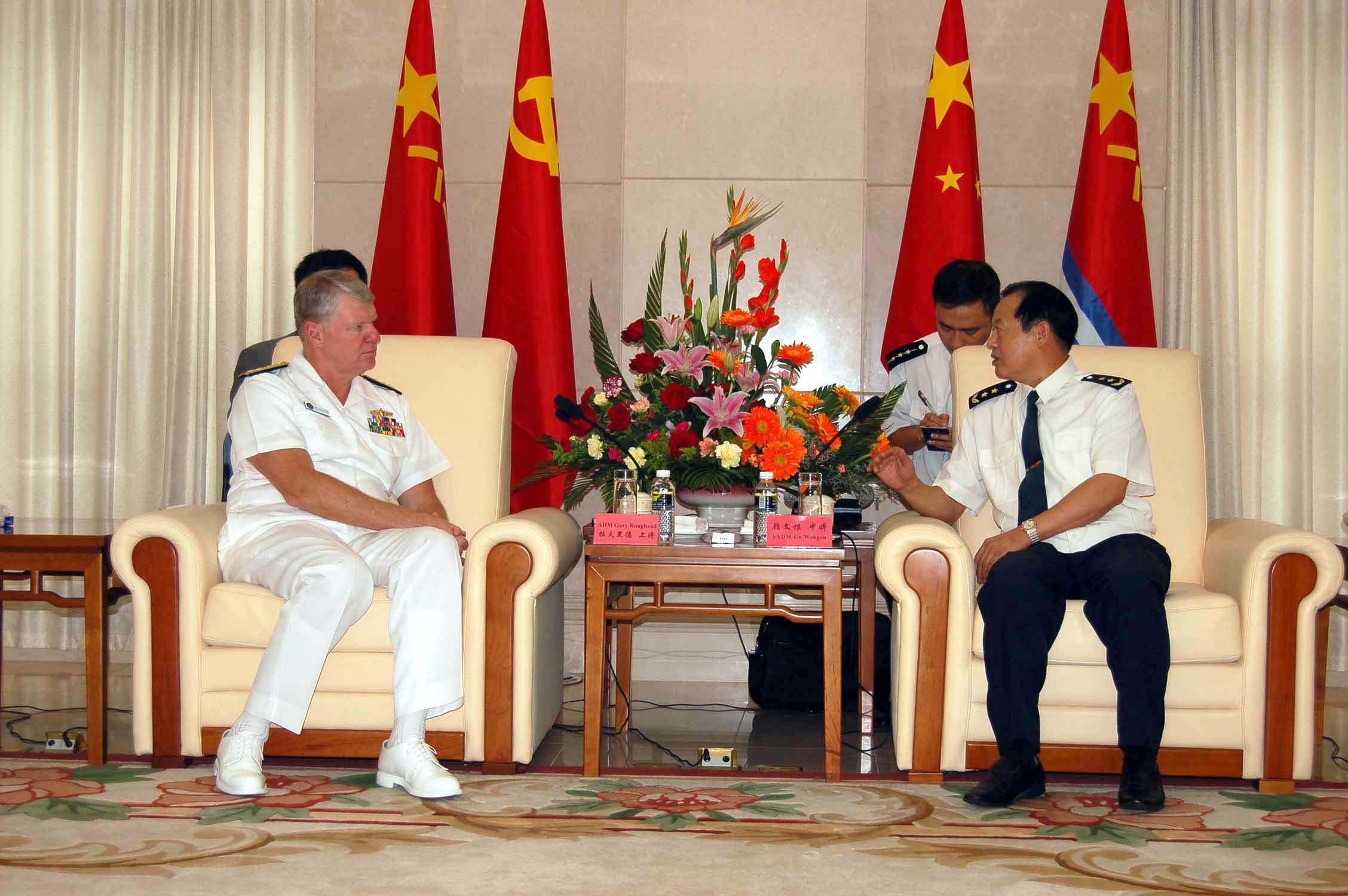
Admiral Gary Roughead making a courtesy call on Vice Admiral Gu Wengen in the port of Zhanjiang

A courtesy call is a call or visit made out of politeness. It is usually done between two parties of high position such as a government official to meet and briefly discuss about important or concerning matters.

== Diplomacy ==
In diplomacy, a courtesy call is a formal meeting in which a diplomat or representative or a famous person of a nation pays a visit out of courtesy to a head of state or state office holder. Courtesy calls may be paid by another head of state, a prime minister, a minister (Government), or a diplomat. The meeting is usually of symbolic value and rarely involves a detailed discussion of issues.

A newly appointed head of mission will usually make a courtesy call to the receiving foreign minister, head of government, and often other dignitaries such as the local mayor. It is also customary for a new head of mission to make courtesy calls to other heads of missions in the capital and often to receive return courtesy calls. Neglecting to pay a courtesy call to missions of smaller countries may result in them resenting the newly arrived mission head. Upon the departure of a head of mission, an additional round of courtesy calls is often expected. Fulfilling this protocol obligation is a time consuming task, with one diplomat noting it took him five months to complete a round in Washington DC.

Diplomatic convention states courtesy calls last 20 minutes, which is some cases is excessive with both sides searching frantically for what to say, though some ambassadors consult an encyclopedia prior to the call to prepare talking points. In other cases, in which the meeting sides have joint items to discuss, a call may last an hour or two. Diplomatic personnel are split on the value of courtesy calls, some seeing them as a time wasting tradition while others see them as a means to secure a valuable introduction. In some cases, it is possible to arrange a joint courtesy call by visiting a senior ambassador who will, by prearrangement, assemble his regional colleagues for the meeting.

Courtesy calls to cabinet members and members of parliament or congress are important and may lay the foundation for a continuing relationship. In Western democracies, ambassadors will pay calls to leaders of minor and major opposition parties as a change of government may occur at a future point. Such calls are important, and the ambassador must take care to cultivate the opposition without offending the incumbents. Calls to civic dignitaries of major cities, newspaper editors, and trade unions are also performed.

== Naval ==
Naval courtesy calls were common in the 19th century. The American Great White Fleet paid a series of courtesy calls to ports around the world in a show of American naval strength in 1907–1909.

United States Navy regulations require that (upon joining a new ship or station) an officer must make a courtesy call to his new commanding officer or commandant within 48 hours after joining.

== Business ==
In business, a courtesy call is a visit or call from a company to customers for the purposes of gauging satisfaction or to thank them for their patronage.
