= Liu Yi =

Liu Yi may refer to:

== People ==
- Liu Yi (footballer, born 1997), Chinese footballer
- Liu Yi (footballer, born 1988)
- Liu Yi (admiral) (刘毅; born 1955), deputy commander of the PLA Navy
- Liu Yi, Marquess of Beixiang (劉懿; died 125 AD), briefly ruled as emperor of the Eastern Han
- Liu Yi, Prince of Liang (劉揖; died 169 BC), Western Han prince of the Liang realm
- Liu Yi (CNTA) (刘毅), former Chairman of China National Tourism Administration
- Liu Yi, Prince of Pingyuan, grandson of Emperor Zhang, and father of Emperor Huan of Han (132–168)
- Liu Yi (died 285), courtesy name Zhongxiong, Cao Wei / Western Jin official and father of Liu Tun
- Liu Yi (died 412), courtesy name Xile, military leader and associate of Emperor Wu of Song (363–422)
- Liu Yi (310–316), Prince of Hejian, son of Liu Cong (Han-Zhao)
- Liu Yi (b. 310) Prince of Pengchen, son of Liu Cong (Han-Zhao)
- Liu Yi (Eastern Han governor) (劉翊), Eastern Han governor of the Henan Commandery
- Liu Yi (Eastern Han writer) (劉毅), Eastern Han Marquis of Pingwang (平望)
- Liu Yi (Chen dynasty) (留異), Chen dynasty general
- Liu Yi (born 1015), author of Formulae to Correct Customs (Zhengsufang)
- Liu Yi (badminton, born 2003), Chinese badminton player
- Liu Yi (badminton, born 2005), Chinese Taipei badminton player
- Liu Yi (badminton, born 1988), Singaporean badminton player
- Liu Yi (character), fictional character associated with a Dragon King's daughter

== Other uses ==
- Six Arts or Liù Yì (六藝), the basis of education in traditional Chinese culture
