= Xu Hongmeng =

Chinese vice-admiral (born 1951)

- 徐洪猛

Deputy Commander of the PLA Navy
- In office December 2009 – December 2014
- Commander: Wu Shengli
- Preceded by: Gu Wengen
- Succeeded by: Jiang Weilie

Commander of the East Sea Fleet
- In office August 2006 – December 2009
- Preceded by: Zhao Guojun
- Succeeded by: Du Jingchen

Personal details
- Born: July 1951 (age 74–75) Suizhong, Liaoning, China
- Party: Chinese Communist Party
- Education: PLA Naval Command Academy

Military service
- Allegiance: China
- Branch/service: People's Liberation Army Navy
- Years of service: ? − 2014
- Rank: Vice-Admiral

Xu Hongmeng (Chinese: 徐洪猛; born July 1951) is a retired vice-admiral (zhong jiang) of the People's Liberation Army Navy (PLAN) of China. He served as Deputy Commander of the PLAN and Commander of the East Sea Fleet.

== Biography ==
Xu Hongmeng was born in July 1951 in Suizhong, Liaoning Province. He graduated from the PLA Naval Command Academy.

Xu served as deputy chief of staff of the PLAN's East Sea Fleet from 1999 to 2002, and commander of the Zhoushan Naval Base from 2002 to 2005. From December 2005 to August 2006 he was deputy chief of staff of the PLAN. In August 2006, he was promoted to commander of the East Sea Fleet, and concurrently deputy commander of the Nanjing Military Region. He attained the rank of vice-admiral in July 2007. In December 2009, he was appointed deputy commander of the PLAN. He retired from active service in December 2014 after reaching the mandatory retirement age, and was replaced by Jiang Weilie.

Xu was a member of the 11th National People's Congress.
