= People's Liberation Army and People's Armed Police delegation to the National People's Congress =

Chinese People's Liberation Army and People's Armed Police Force Delegation to the National People's Congress
- 全国人民代表大会中国人民解放军和中国人民武装警察部队代表团
- Delegation for the National People's Congress
- Theater Commands of the People's Liberation Army
- Electoral unit: People's Liberation Army and People's Armed Police
- Population: 2,000,000 (PLA); 1,520,000 (PAP)
- Major settlements: 33 province-level administrative regions (PLA); 31 province-level administrative regions (PAP)

Current Delegation
- Seats: 243
- Head of delegation: Zhang Shengmin
- Election method: Election committees

The Chinese People's Liberation Army and People's Armed Police Force delegation to the National People's Congress is a delegation composed of deputies representing the People's Liberation Army (PLA) and People's Armed Police (PAP) in within the National People's Congress (NPC), the supreme organ of state power of the People's Republic of China.

This delegation was named the Military Delegation of the National People's Congress from the 1st to the 4th NPC sessions, and the Chinese People's Liberation Army Delegation of the NPC from the 5th to the 12th NPC sessions. In 2022, after NPC deputies elected from the People's Armed Police Force joined this delegation, it changed its name to the present one. The delegations of the PLA and PAP are elected by the election committees established within the PLA and PAP through a differential election. The number of delegates is determined by the Standing Committee of the National People's Congress.

== History ==
Since the 5th NPC, it has usually held about 9 percent of the total delegate seats, and is consistently the largest delegation in the NPC. After the People's Armed Police (PAP) was placed under the command of the Central Military Commission in 2018, the PLA and PAP have formed a joint delegation. In the 14th NPC, for example, the PLA and PAP delegation has 281 deputies; the next largest delegation is Henan, with 174 deputies.

== Election method ==
The delegation is elected by servicemember election committees of top-level military subdivisions, including the PLA's theater commands and service branches.

== List of deputies ==
Year	NPC session	Deputies	Number of deputies	Ref.
1954	1st	Ding Zhihui, Wang Zhaocai, Wang Yougen, Wang Hongkun, Wang Xinting, Wang Weifu, Wang Zhen, Gan Siqi, Zhu Liangcai, Jiang Xueshan, Song Zhongfu, Li Tianyou, Li Tianhuan, Li Zhimin, Zhou Shidi, Zhou Wenjiang, Zhou Huan, Zhou Chunquan, Lin Biao, Hong Xuezhi, Xu Liqing, Xu Xiangqian, Ma Chunyu, Cui Jiangong, Zhang Ming, Zhang Zongxun, Zhang Yingcai, Xu Shiyou, Xu Guangda, Guo Enzhi, Chen Mingren, Chen Xilian, Tao Zhiyue, Lu Changrong, Fu Zhong, Peng Dehuai, Su Yu, He Bingyan, He Long, Huang Chouhe, Huang Kecheng, Yang Zaixian, Dong Qiwu, Liao Hansheng, Zhao Maochen, Zhao Renhu, Liu Zilin, Liu Bocheng, Liu Yalou, Liu Meicun, Liu Shanben, Deng Hua, Zheng Changhua, Xiao Ke, Xiao Jingguang, Xiao Hua, Lai Chuanzhu, Nie Rongzhen, Luo Ronghuan, Tan Zheng	60	
1959	2nd	Ding Zhihui (female), Wang Tianbao, Wang Ping, Wang Hongkun, Wang Jian'an, Wang Xinting, Wang Zheng, Ye Jianying, Liu Xingsheng, Liu Youguang, Liu Huaxiang, Liu Bocheng, Liu Peishan, Liu Shanben, Zhu Liangcai, Xiang Zhonghua, Li Tianyou, Li Tianhuan, Li Da, Chi Haotian, Chen Shiju, Chen Zaidao, Chen Bojun, Chen Mingren, Wu Faxian, Cheng Jun, Wu Shangzhi, Lin Biao, Zhang Lingbin, Luo Ronghuan, Zhou Wenjiang, Zhou Chunquan, Qiu Chuangcheng, Zhao Maochen, Zhao Renhu, Zhao Xingyuan, Tang Qiu (female), Qin Jiwei, Xu Liqing, Xu Xiangqian, Xu Henglu, Guo Enzhi, Xiao Wangdong, Tao Zhiyue, Cui Jiangong, Peng Shaohui, Peng Dehuai, Su Yu, He Long, He Bingyan, Cheng Yuanmao, Fu Qiutao, Fu Zhong, Yang Zhicheng, Yang Jiarui, Dong Qiwu, Zhan Caifang, Lai Chuanzhu, Wei Zhiying, Tan Zheng	60	
1964	3rd	Ding Zhihui, Wei Xiaotang, Ma Yisheng, Wen Niansheng, Fang Guangchao, Wang Tianbao, Wang Bicheng, Wang Ping, Wang Hongkun, Wang Bingzhang, Wang Hai, Wang Yinhu, Wang Xinting, Wang Ruisheng, Ye Jianying, Pi Dingjun, Jiang Wen, Jiang Xueshan, Liu Shaowen, Liu Renfu, Liu Yuti, Liu Xingyuan, Liu Youguang, Liu Huaxiang, Liu Zhijian, Liu Bocheng, Liu Juying, Liu Peishan, Liu Shanben, Liu Daosheng, Cheng Jun, Bi Zhanyun, Zhu Liangcai, Zhu Shaoqing, Xiang Zhonghua, Li Tianyou, Li Changlin, Li Fengming, Li Yuting, Li Shouxuan, Li Juikui, Yang Yinshan, Yang Zhicheng, Yang Zongquan, Yang Jiarui, Wu Yuanming, Wu Xingchun, Wu Kehua, Wu Faxian, Wu Dai, Wu Lie, Qiu Huizuo, Chi Haotian, Zhang Lingbin, Zhang Xichun, Zhang Chunli, Zhang Nansheng, Zhang Naigeng, Zhang Yimin, Lu Changrong, Chen Shiju, Chen Zaidao, Chen Bojun, Chen Qihan, Chen Mingyi, Chen Mingren, Xian Henghan, Pang Guoxing, Zheng Weishan, Lin Yueqin, Lin Biao, Hu Rilebagen, Luo Ruiqing, Yue Zhenhua, Zhou Chunquan, Zhou Jianhua, Zhou Guanwu, Zhao Maochen, Zhao Renhu, Zhao Xingyuan, Hao Zhongyun, Hu Xiudao, Zhong Hanhua, Zhong Chibing, He Long, Guo Tianmin, Guo Linxiang, Guo Enzhi, Guo Peng, Qin Jiwei, Yuan Shengping, Mo Wenhua, Qian Anliang, Xu Wenli, Xu Liqing, Xu Xiangqian, Xu Henglu, Tao Zhiyue, Liang Biye, Xiao XiangrongXiao Jingguang, Xiao Wangdong, Cao Lihuai, Cui Jiangong, Zeng Siyu, Peng Shaohui, Huang Chouhe, Huang Shuying, Huang Xinting, Dong Qiwu, Su Yu, Shu Jicheng, Fu Zhong, Fu Qiutao, Lai Chuanzhu, Zhan Caifang, Liao Hansheng, Tan Furen, Cai E, Wei Zhiying	120	
1975	4th	Ding Bingnan, Ding Sheng, Yu Xiaoping, Yu Tan, Yu Jingshan, Qian Bi, Ma Yunxia (female), Ma Yutao (female), Ma Baishan, Ma Ning, Ma Huanqing (female), Wang Yi, Wang Sanxin, Wang Wanxiang, Wang Tianbao, Wang Congzhou, Wang Liusheng, Wang Wenzhong, Wang Kongyun, Wang Yufeng (female), Wang Yukun, Wang Yuqing, Wang Ping, Wang Shifan, Wang Pili, Wang Zhanshan, Wang Bicheng, Wang Chuanxun, Wang Shouwu, Wang Keqiang, Wang Yingguang, Wang Fanbin, Wang Shangrong, Wang Xin, Wang Mingxuan, Wang Mingde, Wang He'an, Wang Panwen, Wang Xueqing, Wang Jian'an, Wang Jianqing, Wang Shuquan, Wang Baoming, Wang Zhenhua, Wang Zhenxiang, Wang Enyin, Wang Jiyou, Yu Changzai, Wang Meng, Wang Hui, Wang Jing Kun, Wang Fengge, Wang Shanfu (female), Wang Yuhuai, Zhi Zushan, Niu Sibei, Niu Ganyi, Mao Zhangmiao, Deng Zhaoxiang, Ai Fulin, Shi Yichen, Long Laohua, Long Yuelai, Long Bingchu, Long Mei (female), Lu Sheng, Shen Zhongyi, Shen Xiulan (female), Shen Fu, Ye Shuyao, Ye Keshou, Ye Jingang, Ye Jianmin, Ye Jianying, Tian Shixing, Tian Youxiang, Tian Weiyang, Tian Weixin, Shi Shiping, Bai Wenli, Kuang Rennong, Lan Tinghui, Pi Dingjun, Bian Kexin, Xing Xili, Xing Ze, Cheng Jun, Bi Zhanyun, Lü Jilan, Lü Chuanluan, Lü Zhaoyi, Zhu Yuling (female), Zhu Guangya, Zhu Liangcai, Zhu Qixiang, Zhu Ying, Zhu Xueqing, Zhu Xinmin, Zhu Yanyan (female), Zhong YishengRen Fengxian, Liu Yi, Liu Renfu, Liu Yuti, Liu Yongfa, Liu Cunxin, Liu Bangxian, Liu Zhaoshan, Liu Ruxian, Liu Zhijian, Liu Bocheng, Liu Botang, Liu Hong (female), Liu Yinglan (female), Liu Xianquan, Liu Yantian, Liu Shaowen, Liu Baoting, Liu Xiaofeng, Liu Xiaoxin (female), Liu Huanqian, Liu Xukun, Liu Jingtian, Liu Daosheng, Liu Fucun, Liu Zhen, Liu Yaozong, Yi Ruilun, Guan Shengzhi, Guan Qiming, Jiang Xianzong, Xu Shiyou, Xu Lefu, Sun Wenyuan, Sun Shuhai, Sun Yushui, Sun Yuguo, Sun Leyi, Sun Chenliang, Sun Zhifang, Sun Liangping, Sun Zhihou, Sun Shengkuan, Ji Zhongsheng, Yan Dafang, Yan Jiaan, Su Zhenhua, Su Minjing, Du Jisheng, Du Ping Du Yongchun, Du Xiren, Li Kaiyin, Li Zhagen, Li Youlian, Li Congyue, Li Yuerong (female), Li Wentang, Li Wenmo, Li Shian, Li Shiyan, Li Yongqiang, Li Fasuo, Li Da, Li Chengchun, Li Shouxuan, Li Zhimin, Li Huaide, Li Maoqin, Li Baoshi, Li Jiarong (female), Li Min (female), Li Mixin, Li Yide, Li Daozhi, Li Yuanyi, Li Juikui, Li Cuilan (female), Li Desheng, Li Xincheng, Yang Dalun, Yang Zhongxing, Yang Yushu, Yang Liru, Yang Jilin, Yang Shoujiang, Yang Zhen, Yang Guofu, Yang Yucai, Yang Zemin, Yang Meijiu, Yang Silu, Yang Yong, Yang Meisheng, Yang Dezhi, Yang Qingsheng, Yang Hongru, Xiao Yuanli, Xiao QuanfuXiao Hongshu, Xiao Jingguang, Shi Xinren, Wu Jikang, Wu Xizhi, Wu Shijie, Wu Huaicai, Wu Xinquan, Wu Hengsheng, Wu Aixia (female), Wu Chaoxiang (female), Bie Zuhou, He Guangyu, He Huiyan, He Bihui (female), Yu Lijin, Yu Guangmao, Yu Shusheng, Gu Zizhen, Di Fucai, Zou Yongcui (female), Zou Dehong (female), Leng Pengfei, Wang Youjie, Wang Shuihua, Wang Jiadao, Wang Dezhao, Shen Yunquan, Song Wenhai, Song Shilun, Song Ruojiang, Zhang Dapeng, Zhang Wanjiu, Zhang Tianyun, Zhang Yuanpei, Zhang Zhengxin, Zhang Fengqi, Zhang Fengting, Zhang Jichen, Zhang Yushan, Zhang Shigai, Zhang Dongliang, Zhang Lixun, Zhang Dazhi, Zhang Jizhi, Zhang Zhifu, Zhang Lijuan (female), Zhang Lianhua, Zhang Xicai, Zhang Huairui Zhang Yingfu, Zhang Zhiyin, Zhang Zongxun, Zhang Jingwen, Zhang Yingzhe (female), Zhang Hongzhui, Zhang Guiwu, Zhang Guijin, Zhang Aiping, Zhang Meihua (female), Zhang Yuenan (female), Zhang Bin, Zhang Xinhua, Zhang Debin, Zhang Ji, Zhang Yaoci, Lu Xiunan, Lu Weishan, Abudu, Chen Shiju, Chen Tianlong, Chen Renshan, Chen Fengying (female), Chen Wenyin, Chen Zhengxiang, Chen Shuishun, Chen Xianrui, Chen Shoukang, Chen Yongxian, Chen Qitong, Chen Qihan, Chen Haosu, Chen Mengyu, Chen Kangming, Chen Shuqing (female), Chen Huiting, Chen Xixiang, Chen Xilian, Chen Jingu (female), Chen Fuchu, Chen Fusheng, Chen De, Shao Huaze, Shao Junwu (female), Wu Zhongrong, Fan Sujing (female), Fan Chaoli, Lin Yueqin (female), Lin Lanying(Female), Lin Yiping, Lin Dexing, Lin Zun, Ban Chang'an, Shang Xiuyu (female), Luo Huasheng, Luo Tong, Luo Changyuan, He Zhiguo, Jin Qingming, Jin Xiuqing, Jin Xiubin, Zhou Shidi, Zhou Shuiduo, Zhou Shizhong, Zhou Xihan, Zhou Chunquan, Zhou Jinhuang, Zhou Jianhua, Zhou Guanwu, Zhou Guisheng, Zheng Benyan, Zheng Xiwen, Zheng Xilong, Guan Junting, Ju Shuangchi, Meng Ke, Zhao Wenjin, Zhao Bing'an, Zhao Xianshun, Zhao Zhongfan, Zhao Xiangpi, Zhao Jinghui (female), Zhao Puyu, Zhao Xinle, Zhao Defang, Hao Zhongyun, Hao Shengwang, Hu Tianquan, Hu Lan (female), Hu Shougen, Hu Qicai, Hu Shangli, Hu Shuyi (female), Hu Bingyun, Hu Qingbi (female), Ke Changjun, Cha Yusheng, Zhong Shao Zhen (female), Zhong Hanhua, Zhong Chibing, Zhong Guochu, Duan Wenyi, Duan Suquan, Duan Lianshao, Duan Huanjing, Xin Junjie, Hou Runtao, Shi Kangmei (female), Yun Renxiang, Jiang Ying, Jiang Sichang, Gong Zhaode, Fei Guozhu, Yao Hucheng, Yao Zhe, He Dongsheng, He Cheng, He Jinnian, Qin Jiwei, Nie Rongzhen, Mo Wenhua, Suona (female), Jia Ganrui, Yuan Chi, Gu Yongwu, Gu Xiu, Qian Xuesen, Tie Shilin, Xu Liqing, Xu Tingze, Xu Xiangqian, Xu Qixiao, Xu Bailing, Xu Xin, Xu Henglu, Xu Jie, Xu Min (female), Xu Jinrong, Yin Zhishu, Gao Houliang, Gao Haolin, Gao Qiurong (female), Guo Yanlin, Guo Xing, Guo Linxiang, Guo Peng, Tang Zian, Tang Tianji, Tang ShudiTang He, Zhu Huifen (female), Zhan Ming, Tao Zhiyue, Huang Xinzhan, Huang Chouhe, Huang Ligong, Huang Daxuan, Huang Laide, Huang Qihong, Huang Genhai, Huang Aizhu (female), Huang Chaotian, Huang Ruixiang, Huang Xinting, Huang Demao, Cao Danov, Gong Xinggui, Cui Wenbin, Cui Tianmin, Cui Jijun (female), Cui Zhiying (female), Cui Jiangong, Cui Guijiang, Fu Tingguang, Yan Renhou, Yan Shihou, Yan Tongmao, Yan Dexing, Liang Biye, Liang Shoupan, Peng Shilu, Peng Shihong, Peng Mingzhi, Peng Shaozhi, Peng Shaohui, Peng Fujiu, Dong Guangji, Dong Qiwu, Jiang Bangli, Han Dongshan, Han Xianchu, Han Liancheng Han Min, Han Shu, Su Yu, Ji Weigong, Cheng Kaijia, Cheng Dengzhi, Fu Chuanzuo, Fu Qiutao, Fu Chongbi, Lu Zhian, Tong Guogui, Zeng Shaoshan, Zeng Shulin, Zeng Siyu, Zeng Mei, Wen Xianxing, Wen Anren, Xie Zhenhua, Xie Qinghua (female), Jin Xiuai (female), Lai Yi, Lu Zongcheng, Zhan Caifang, Zhan Haiying, Bao Guochen, Chu Chuanyu, Cai Qiao, Liao Hansheng, Liao Guanxian, Liao Dinglin, Tan Shuheng, Tan Jiashu, Xiong Zhisheng, Li Qun, Teng Junqing, Teng Haiqing, Yan Fu, Pan Shilin, Pan Aili (female), Pan Xinggong, Pan Guirong (female), Pan Shuoduan, Xue Ming (female), Xue Zhenjia, Heng Xiaomao	486	
1978	5th	Ding Zhihui, Ding Ronglin, Yu Kefa, Yu Tan, Wan Haifeng, Ma Weihua, Ma Baishan, Ma Lida, Ma Shouxi, Ma Yisheng, Ma Yuezhen, Wang Yi, Wang Wanlin, Wang Wanxiang, Wang Zijian, Wang Fei, Wang Yuanming, Wang Juquan, Wang Congzhou, Wang Kongyun, Wang Shigan, Wang Pili, Wang Shixiang, Wang Ping, Wang Pingshui, Wang Zhanshan, Wang Lanying, Wang Bicheng, Wang Yafu, Wang Tingrui, Wang Yu, Wang Zhixin, Wang Liya, Wang Junpai, Wang Yinggao, Wang Zhi, Wang Shang, Wang Xin, Wang Zhong, Wang He'an, Wang Jinquan, Wang Panwen, Wang Dinglie, Wang Chenghan, Wang Jian'an, Wang Jingwen, Wang Ruzhi, Wang Baoming, Wang Xianzeng, Wang Guanyang Wang Zhenzong, Wang Zhenyong, Wang Guiying, Wang Xiaoling, Wang Hai, Wang Zhan, Wang Sen, Wang Jingkun, Wang Ruichang, Wang Yuhuai, Wang Deming, Wei Jie, Wei Guoqing, Yun Chenglie, Niu Limin, Niu Zhenyun, Mao Weiliang, Mao Xian, Wen Ji, Fang Xiang, Fang Yihua, Yin Liqin, Sun Qingzhi, Kong Qingde, Kong Junbiao, Ba Zhen, Deng Xiaoping, Deng Zhaoxiang, Deng Yue, Deng Jiatai, Gan Weihan, Zuo Sanxing, Zuo Xianying, Shi Song, Shi Zhonghan, Long Feihu, Long Guilin, Lu Rencan, Ye Zhengda, Ye Hanlin, Ye Zihua, Ye Jingang, Ye Jianmin, Ye Jianying, Ye Honghai, Tian Shixing, Tian Song, Tian Bo, Shi Shiping, Shi Jingban, Feng KaiLan Tinghui, Jamila, Xing Ze, Xing Xinfu, Qu Jingji, Lü Shiying, Lü Qiqing, Zhu Shihuan, Zhu Guangya, Zhu Zhaoyun, Zhu Liangcai, Zhu Zhongjie, Zhu Hengxing, Zhu Qunsheng, Qiao Ping, Cheng Jun, Wu Shengrong, Hua Fengxiang, Yi Changshun, Xiang Zhonghua, Liu Xiaoan, Liu Yi, Liu Ziyun, Liu Zimei, Liu Youguang, Liu Fengqi, Liu Zhanrong, Liu Baiyu, Liu Han, Liu Bocheng, Liu Botang, Liu Hong, Liu Yingzhi, Liu Jinhai, Liu Chunshan, Liu Hongda, Liu Gongfang, Liu Ling, Liu Xukun, Liu Sen, Liu Dechen, Liu Derun, Liu Xinghua, Qi Kun, Yi Ruilun, Guan Shengzhi, Jiang Wen, Xu Shiyou, Xu Jialin, Sun Naihang, Sun Yu Bin, Sun Chenliang, Sun Huafeng, Sun Butang, Sun Qilong, Sun Dianhe, Yin Fatang, Ji Dongjiang, Yan Jiaan, Su Wanchang, Su Baochen, Su Minjing, Du Yueqing, Du Yongchun, Du Xishu, Du Xiren, Du Yuhua, Li Renlin, Li Zhagen, Li Youlian, Li Shaoyuan, Li Yuerong, Li Wentang, Li Ping, Li Yongtai, Li Yamin, Li Zhen, Li Tingshan, Li Xiangmin, Li Fanshan, Li Jun, Li Shouxuan, Li Yuanxiang, Li Xiaoguo, Li Kezhong, Li Liangguan, Li Xin, Li Baoqi, Li Jianyun, Li Jingsheng, Li Chunming, Li Yan, Li Zhenhua, Li Peiji, Li Fanma, Li Chao, Li Jingzhan, Li Juikui, Li Desheng, Yang WentingYang Yishan, Yang Tinggui, Yang Chengwu, Yang Zhen, Yang Guoyu, Yang Yucai, Yang Zongxian, Yang Silu, Yang Yong, Yang Dezhi, Yang Huanmin, Xiao Hua, Xiao Jingguang, Xiao Hongda, Shi Xinren, Wu Kehua, Wu Chunren, Wu Shengkai, Wu Zhencai, Wu Lie, Wu Aixia, Wu Ji'en, Wu Chaoxiang, Wu Fushan, Kuang Fuzhao, He Youfa, He Guangyu, He Tingyi, He Zhicong, He Huiyan, He Bihui, Yu Lijin, Yu Guangmao, Zou Yongcui, Leng Pengfei, Shen Qixian, Shen Peihua, Shen Shanwen, Song Yuange, Song Shilun, Song Shangji, Song Jizhen, Zhang Lixiong, Zhang Tianshu, Zhang Yuanpei, Zhang Fengyun, Zhang Fengting, Zhang Fengqi, Zhang Wenbi, Zhang Ji Chen, Zhang Yumin, Zhang Zhengxin, Zhang Dongning, Zhang Yongyi, Zhang Zhenhui, Zhang Tingfa, Zhang Rusan, Zhang Laifang, Zhang Xiqin, Zhang Xiyong, Zhang Qibin, Zhang Chunqing, Zhang Xianlin, Zhang Zhong, Zhang Zhiyin, Zhang Chengge, Zhang Jingwen, Zhang Shukui, Zhang Xiangfen, Zhang Baotian, Zhang Hongzhui, Zhang Xiaoli, Zhang Aiping, Zhang Weizi, Zhang Qi, Zhang Qian, Zhang Jingmei, Zhang Zhen, Zhang Zhenhuan, Lu Weishan, Chen Fengying, Chen Doukui, Chen Pi, Chen Zaidao, Chen Gang, Chen Zhibin, Chen Zhixin, Chen Fangyun, Chen Wukui, Chen Haosu, Chen Jide, Chen Daoxiu, Chen Xilian, Chen Fusheng, Chen De, Chen Dexian, Wu Youdao, Wu Yanping, Xing Yuanlin, Gou TianpuFan Zhongxiang, Fan Sujing, Fan Chaoli, Lin Benrong, Lin Yiping, Lin Zhong, Lin Bingyuan, Lin Ziquan, Lin Weixian, Lin Zun, Zhi Shunyi, Zhuo Lin, Shang Tan, Luo Rongjiang, Luo Ruiqing, Yue Xinguang, Jin Rubai, Zhou Shidi, Zhou Shuiduo, Zhou Xihan, Zhou Qiguo, Zhou Jinhuang, Zhou Jianhua, Zhou Guisheng, Zhou Yikuan, Zhou Yuhong, Zhou Cuikuan, Di Jianxiu, Zheng Zibin, Zheng Benyan, Zheng Shiyun, Zheng Xiwen, Zheng Guozhong, Zheng Xiaofeng, Guan Junting, Meng Ke, Meng Xiancheng, Zhao Yunhe, Zhao Wenjin, Zhao Donglan, Zhao Liyu, Zhao Lantian, Zhao Yongsheng, Zhao Yonghuan, Zhao Xianshun, Zhao Wei, Zhao Nanqi, Zhao Bing'an, Zhao Defang, Hao Lingli Hao Shengwang, Hu Zhengping, Hu Xidao, Hu Shuyi, Hu Bingyun, Hu Jicheng, Ke Changjun, Cha Yusheng, Liu Zhiying, Zhong Shaozhen, Zhong Anrong, Zhong Guochu, Qin Weiwu, Duan Suquan, Duan Siying, Jiang Lindong, Jiang Sichang, Hong Min, Hong Lin, Hong Xuezhi, Zhu Xingfa, Fei Longshan, Fei Guozhu, Xu Guangyi, He Ming, He Yinxian, Qin Jiwei, Nie Rongzhen, Mo Wenhua, Jia Chunxiang, Jia Ganrui, Jia Xinqiao, Xia Guangya, Xia Ke, Gu Yongwu, Chai Jingen, Dang Peixin, Qian Xuesen, Xu Huamin, Xu Tingze, Xu Zhongyu, Xu Xiangqian, Xu Fangchun, Xu Qixiao, Xu Guoxian, Xu Ming, Xu Chengzhi, Xu Bailing, Xu Xin, Xu HengluXu Jinrong, Luan Dechu, Gao Fang, Gao Zhanjie, Gao Cunxin, Gao Houliang, Guo Tianmu, Guo Huaruo, Guo Yanlin, Guo Linxiang, Guo Jinlin, Tang Tianji, Tang Gang, Tang Zuohou, Tang Shudi, Tang Jiao, Tao Zhiyue, Sandahai, Huang Changsheng, Huang Chouhe, Huang Ligong, Huang Liqing, Huang Daxuan, Huang Kecheng, Huang Shutian, Huang Guanting, Huang Chaotian, Huang Ruixiang, Huang Demao, Mei Zhaodi, Cao Danov ·Zayier, Cao Huiying, Cao Yi, Cui Tianmin, Cui Jijun, Cui Guijiang, Kang Feng, Kang Chengshan, Yan Tongmao, Yan Shouhu, Yan Dexing, Liang Tianxi, Liang Biye, Liang Shoupan, Tu Kaiyuan, Ju Youshan, Peng Shihong, Peng Hepeng, Peng Wuhua, Peng Meiji, Peng Qingyun, Peng Qingyun, Dong Qiwu, Dong Chao, Jiang Yuzhen, Jiang Runguan, Han Zhiping, Han Jinfeng, Han Siguo, Han Min, Su Yu, Cheng Kaijia, Cheng Shicai, Fu Kuiqing, Fu Zhong, Fu Qiutao, Fu Chongbi, Lu Decai, Zeng Zhaolin, Zeng Siyu, Zeng Haisheng, Wen Xianxing, Xie Ming, Xie Tangzhong, Jin Jiafu, Jin Xiuai, Lei Ziping, Zhan Caifang, Xie Quanwei, Chu Chuanyu, Cai Youzhang, Cai Baoyuan, Cai Qiao, Liao Hansheng, Liao Haiguang, Tan Zhigeng, Tan Zheng, Tan Xingting, Tan Shanhe, Xiong Fei, Xiong Zhisheng, Fan Xiaowen, Li Ming, Teng Junqing, Teng Genggeng, Yan Jinsheng, Pan Mingxuan, Xue Zhen, Ji Xianmin, Dai Bingfu, Wei JinshanWei Xuecheng	503	
1983	6th	Yunusuf Aishan, Yu Houde, Ma Shilin, Ma Zhanmin, Ma Zhaokun, Ma Bingchen, Wang Zibo, Wang Zheng, Wang Lanjiang, Wang Yongning, Wang Chengke, Wang Chengqi, Wang Qingyang, Wang Xiufa, Wang Dinglie, Wang Lili, Wang Gencheng, Wang Peilu, Wang Chun, Wang Jingmin, Wang Yuzhou, Niu Ji, Mao Yu, Kong Congzhou, Kong Zhaowen, Deng Shiping, Deng Jiatai, Yu Zonghuan, Zuo Liang, Shi Zongli, Lu Sheng, Ye Fei, Ye Qin, Bai Hongpu, Feng Da, Feng Zheng, Jamila, Bi Hao, Lü Zhidong, Lü Liang, Zhu Boru, Zhu Qingyu, Zhu Dunfa, Zhu Qin, Zhu Yaohua, Qiao Ping, Qiao Yingxia, Wu Kunshan, Liu Yuti, Liu Zhanrong, Liu Bai Yu, Liu Lifeng, Liu Youguang, Liu Cunzhi, Liu Lilin, Liu Zhao, Liu Botang, Liu Xifeng, Liu Kai, Liu Yantian, Liu Xueji, Liu Chunshan, Liu Hengzuo, Liu Xiaolian, Liu Xizhong, Liu Feng, Liu Xinzeng, Liu Depu, Qi Zhongheng, Yi Ruilun, Jiang Mucan, Xu Sheng, Sun Yunhan, Sun Dianjia, Su Zhang, Du Fu, Li Wenqing, Li Wenqing, Li Ping, Li Yamin, Li Guangjun, Li Tongxing, Li Zhicheng, Li Xigeng, Li Jixiang, Li Jijing, Li Zongan, Li Nanye, Li Zhongxuan, Li Xuanhua, Li Peiji, Li Bin, Li Xuesan, Li Fucai, Li Qun, Li Weihua, Li Yulin, Yang Li, Yang Zhenggang, Yang Shiyi, Yang YongbinYang Hanwen, Yang Gang, Yang Xiushan, Yang Yingchang, Yang Jie, Yang Guofan, Yang Guoyu, Yang Dezhi, Xiao Xuanjin, Wu Guangyu, Wu Gang, Wu Zhen, He Zhengwen, Yu Qiuli, Gu Jingsheng, Song Changgeng, Song Keda, Song Zhongxian, Song Chengzhi, Zhang Guangyou, Zhang Taiheng, Zhang Zhongru, Zhang Wu, Zhang Wenjie, Zhang Xiulong, Zhang Huairui, Zhang Xianyue, Zhang Yan, Zhang Zongwen, Zhang Nansheng, Zhang Xianzong, Zhang Guirong, Zhang Zhenchuan, Zhang Jiaji, Zhang Jingyi, Zhang Chaozhong, Zhang Jinghua, Zhang Churan, Zhang Fucheng, Zhang Dianzhong, Zhang Zhenhuan, Zhang Defu, Zhang Lin, Chen Xianrui, Chen Zhibin, Chen Zhaodi, Chen Mingyi, Chen Kai, Chen Aihua, Chen Jide Chen Peimin, Chen Hui, Chen Jingsan, Chen Jingzao, Chen Fujie, Chen Xi, Chen Heqiao, Shao Yunxing, Miao Jingfen, Lin Guangcai, Lin Yueqin, Lin Jigui, Ouyang Yi, Shang Zhigong, Luo Fang, Luo Dongjin, Luo Shanggong, Luo Bin, Xiu Bumei, Zhou Yibing, Zhou Yuehan, Zhou Keyu, Zhou Deli, Pang Xiuting, Zheng Weishan, Meng Letian, Meng Yishan, Zhao Shuangxuan, Zhao Xianshun, Zhao Huifang, Hao Yongfu, Hao Yan, Hu Bohua, Hu Ronggui, Hu Xuqing, Zhong Shizhen, Zhong Youhuang, Duan Suquan, Rao Shoukun, Jiang Yutian, Jiang Sichang, Jiang Zhong, Qian Demen, Hong Jiade, Xu Guangyi, Yao Baoqian, He Qingji, Yuan Hongjin, Nie Li, Mo WenhuaXia Zhuyu, Xia Kui, Gu Bingsheng, Dang Fanshen, Qian Chuanxun, Qian Shaojun, Qian Gui, Qian Hechang, Xu Yuanbin, Xu Tingze, Xu Fangchun, Xu Chunyang, Xu Bin, Xu Dengkun, Gao Xingmin, Gao Huanchang, Gao Rui, Guo Linxiang, Guo Tao, Tang Peixian, Tang Jiao, Huang Yukun, Huang Zaiyu, Huang Xiaolian, Huang Hao, Mei Hejia, Chang Fengju, Cui Tianmin, Cui Chengnan, Cui Lun, Cui Xingquan, Cui Ping, Fu Xianhui Fu Zhiluo, Kang Lize, Kang Mingcai, Kang Xinghuo, Yan Zhuo, Liang Tianhui, Liang Peiying, Peng Jingfeng, Ge Yi, Jiang Baohua, Han Xianchu, Han Huaizhi, Cheng Biwen, Fu Chongbi, Zeng Shaoshan, Wen Gang, Hua Jun, Xie Zhenghao, Xie Youfa, Lan Dingshou, Kuai Dawei, Zhen Shen, Xie Fang, Cai Zhen, Cai Deyong, Liao Hansheng, Liao Haiguang, Tan Biren, Zhai Xiyun, Li Bangsui, Yan Qingyun, Pan Zhaomin, Pan Yan	267	
1988	7th	Ding Wenchang, Diao Peize, Yu Naichang, Ma Chi, Ma Xinchun, Ma Bingchen, Ma Chunwa, Wang Changsheng, Wang Yuqi, Wang Shen, Wang Lichun, Wang Yongning, Wang Yonglin, Wang Youhan, Wang Hongji, Wang Maorun, Wang Yingzhou, Wang Minghai, Wang Ju, Wang Jianye, Wang Zhongqi, Wang Xiuzhong, Wang Baochen, Wang Yan, Wang Xianzhe, Wang Guande, Wang Xiaohong, Wang Aiwu, Wang Meng, Wang Qingtao, Wang Xugong, Wang Xiangsheng, Wang Jingbo, Wei Yu, Niu Xianmin, Niu Jinshan, Kong Xianli, Deng Xiaoping, Deng Jiatai, Yu Zonghuan, Ye Fei, Tian Yongcun, Tian Jing, Bai Wenzhong, Ning Duorong, Xing Shizhong, Xing Zhiyong, Bi Hao, Qu Jining, Lü Xiangsheng, Lü Liang Zhu Weibin, Zhu Chao, Zhu Dunfa, Xiang Xiaoshu, Liu Xiaoan, Liu Yuming, Liu Yuti, Liu Lifeng, Liu Youguang, Liu Cunzhi, Liu Lunxian, Liu Huaqing, Liu Rujun, Liu Xingwen, Liu Lilin, Liu Boran, Liu Mingren, Liu Mingpu, Liu Kai, Liu Xueji, Liu Shaoxian, Liu Zhentang, Liu Guinan, Liu Xiaolian, Liu Xinzeng, Sun Wenqing, Sun Chengru, Sun Yulin, Yin Fatang, Du Ke'an, Du Yu, Wu Zhizhong, Li Kaiyun, Li Yuanxi, Li Changlin, Li Changgen, Li Huaxin, Li Wenqing, Li Wenbin, Li Yongtai, Li Lun, Li Laizhu, Li Xilin, Li Jie, Li Zong'an, Li Shubo, Li Xuanhua, Li Shuo, Li Jing, Li JingweiLi Ruixiu, Yang Baibing, Yang Yongbin, Yang Anzhong, Yang Zhifan, Yang Shangkun, Yang Chaofen, Yang Xilan, Lian Yaoting, Xiao Xuchu, Xiao Jiaxi, Xiao Mu, Wu Yuqian, Wu Guangxian, Wu Aiqun, Wu Jiamin, Wu Quanxu, Li Shaoan, He Yixiang, He Shangchun, Tong Baocun, Gu Jingsheng, Zou Yuqi, Kurban Ershidin, Xin Ming, Shen Changxiang, Shen Rongjun, Shen Chunnian, Song Shuanglai, Song Yingqi, Song Chengzhi, Song Qingwei, Chi Yunxiu, Chi Haotian, Zhang Gong, Zhang Taiheng, Zhang Juhui, Zhang Shaohua, Zhang Shaosong, Zhang Changwei, Zhang Wenhua, Zhang Zhijian, Zhang Xiulong, Zhang Xusan, Zhang Maozhong, Zhang Yingming, Zhang Mingyuan, Zhang Mingchun, Zhang Jianmin Zhang Xiangge, Zhang Zhenxian, Zhang Jingfen, Lu Ruyu, Chen Yushuang, Chen Dongying, Chen Xitao, Chen Mingshan, Chen Zhongxian, Chen Xianhua, Chen Hongyuan, Chen Peimin, Chen Peizhong, Chen Jingzao, Chen Jing, Chen Heqiao, Lin Yueqin, Lin Hu, Lin Jigui, Lin Xishi, Luo Bangjie, Luo Shanggong, Luo Jinghui, Yue Dewang, Jin Gong, Kuai Wanzeng, Zhou Kunren, Zhou Yuefa, Zhou Manshu, Zheng Wenhan, Zheng Xianbin, Zheng Guozhong, Zheng Ti, Zhao Minghuo, Zhao Nanqi, Zhao Huanzhi, Hao Baoqing, Hu Ronggui, Zhong Liming, Duan Suquan, Hou Zhixin, Jiang Yutian, Jiang Zhizeng, Jiang Deting, Hong Xuezhi, Hong Jiade, Gong Yongfeng, Yao Shuren, He Jinheng, He Pengfei, Qin JiangchangQin Xinghan, Qin Boyi, Qin Jiwei, Nie Li, Xia Xiuying, Qian Diqian, Xu Yongqing, Xu Chuandu, Xu Fangchun, Xu Lili, Xu Xiaowu, Xu Binshi, Gao Tianzheng, Gao Tongsheng, Gao Shuchun, Guo Fenglin, Guo Tao, Tang Guangcai, Tang Lizhong, Huang Yiwu, Huang Yukun, Huang Yuzhang, Huang Zaiyu, Huang Ziqiang, Huang Xu, Huang Bingxin, Huang Jianhong, Cao Wen'e, Cao Shuangming, Cao Siming, Cui Shifang, Zhang Zhaoxun, Yan Zhuo Sui Yongju, Dong Xuelin, Dong Yisheng, Han Huaizhi, Jing Xueqin, Fu Yingjie, Fu Bingyue, Fu Kuiqing, Zeng Yuqing, Wen Zongren, Wen Jingyi, Jin Yuxuan, Jin Qingfeng, Lan Dingshou, Lei Chunlin, Lu Baoyin, Zhan Danan, Cai Renshan, Cai Gongjie, Cai Ying, Cai Jianyu, Zang Wenqing, Zang Sui, Pei Jiuzhou, Pei Huailiang, Gawang, Liao Hansheng, Liao Jianfang, Tan Fujie, Yan Jinsheng, Pan Riyuan, Pan Yan, Wei Mingyi	267	
1993	8th	Ding Yucai, Ding Shouyue, Diao Congzhou, Yu Yongbo, Yu Jingchang, Yao Xingyuan, Ma Fengtong, Ma Zhanmin, Ma Chi, Ma Jianxin, Ma Shenglin, Ma Fucai, Wang Shaojun, Wang Zhanhua, Wang Shen, Wang Lichun, Wang Yongning, Wang Yongming, Wang Tongzhuo, Wang Zuoyi, Wang Chunrui, Wang Hongfu, Wang Zuxun, Wang Jiying, Wang Qingtao, Wang Xugong, Wang Qi, Wang Defang, Mao Bingxiang, Fang Zuqi, Yin Wensheng, Kong Zhaowen, Kong Denian, Deng Xiaoping, Deng Changyou, Shi Baoyuan, Ye Zhengda, Tian Shugen, Shi Shuizhou, Feng Jinmao, Xing Shizhong, Cheng Shouliang, Lü Tingheng, Lü Jiashu, Zhu Yongqing, Zhu Guang, Zhu Jing, Zhu Chao, Zhu Miaoquan, Zhu Zengquan, Qiao Wenqing Wu Suhua, Quan Yingzi, Qing Xiurong, Liu Youfa, Liu Shutian, Liu Yuzhai, Liu Shilun, Liu Dongcai, Liu Shichu, Liu Yongxiang, Liu Huaqing, Liu Guoyu, Liu Kai, Liu Baojian, Liu Hongfang, Liu Zhenhua, Liu Guinan, Liu Xinzeng, Liu Zhenwu, Qi Zhenhua, Xu Zhigong, Xu Sheng, Sun Manyi, Sun Jinghua, Sun Cuiping, Yin Fatang, Maimaiti Ailiyan'eryi, Du Shigang, Li Yuanzheng, Li Yunshan, Li Yunsheng, Li Yongjin, Li Yongtai, Li Duihong, Li Bangliang, Li Xilin, Li Lun, Li Xuge, Li Jie, Li Shuwen, Li Junlian, Li Guilin, Li Jisong, Li Huilan, Li Dingwen, Li Daofen, Yang Shijie, Yang Zicai, Yang ZhenggangYang Shixi, Yang Baibing, Yang Hanwen, Yang Weiyan, Yang Zhihua, Yang Huaiqing, Yang Hong, Yang Zhenyu, Yang Genyuan, Yang Rongya, Yang Dechun, Xiao Huaishu, Wu Shuangzhan, Wu Huashan, Wu Runzhong, Wu Jiamin, Wu Xiangqing, Qiu Guangcan, He Yanfang, He Shanfu, He Xinming, Tong Wuen Baiyila, Di Ronghua, Shen Zhaoji, Shen Yufeng, Song Dianyi, Chi Haotian, Zhang Erwang, Zhang Wannian, Zhang Taiheng, Zhang Wentai, Zhang Wenhua, Zhang Hanping, Zhang Chuanmiao, Zhang Zhongxian, Zhang Zhijian, Zhang Xusan, Zhang Guochu, Zhang Mingyuan, Zhang Baokang, Zhang Zhenqian, Zhang Jiade, Zhang Bin, Zhang Mou, Zhang Xiang, Zhang Zhen, Lu Zaide, Chen Yichun, Chen Dazhi, Chen Tingxia Chen Huaping, Chen Xitao, Chen Mingshan, Chen Xuechu, Chen Rongxiang, Chen Xianhua, Chen Peimin, Chen Peisen, Chen Zhangyuan, Chen Deming, Chen Yanqin, Shao Shicheng, Naziguli, Fan Xihong, Lin Chuankang, Lin Hu, Lin Jigui, Yi Yuanqiu, Luo Youli, Jin Yilian, Zhou Ziyu, Zhou Wenbi, Zhou Erjun, Zhou Zaikang, Zhou Yibing, Zhou Chunshan, Zheng Shenxia, Zheng Bangyu, Zheng Wanzhi, Zheng Shunzhou, Zheng Bingqing, Shan Jilin, Qu Quansheng, Zhao Guoguang, Zhao Guimao, Zhao Haibin, Zhao Xinxian, Zhao Xiguang, Hu Changfa, Hu Shihao, Hu Zaiyin, Zhong Yuzheng, Zhong Fayou, Duan Xikang, He Ping, Qin Jiwei, Yuan Shubin, Geng Lianfeng, Nie Li, Li QianmingJia Fukun, Dunzhu Dorje, Xu Wenyi, Xu Tongye, Xu Xin, Xu Jiazhu, Xu Huizi, Gao Yuanfa, Gao Yunjiang, Gao Shiliang, Guo Yuxiang, Guo Boxiong, Guo Guirong, Guo Peigong, Guo Xizhang, Tang Guangcai, Tang Tianbiao, Tang Shouyang, Ji Shengde, Huang Yuzhang, Huang Maojiang, Huang Xuelu, Huang Hengmei, Huang Jianhong, Xiao Rong, Gong Pingqiu, Cui Tongshan, Fu Chuanrong, Kang Chengren, Kang Fuquan, Liang Tailin, Long Zhiyong, Dong Yunhai Dong Zhanlin, Dong Liangju, Dong Yisheng, Jiang Shunxue, Han Shiqian, Han Huaizhi, Su Rongsheng, Jing Zaixin, Yu Zhonggui, Cheng Jianning, Cheng Xiaojian, Fu Quanyou, Fu Bingyao, Shu Yutai, Wen Yuzhu, Wen Guangchun, Xie Guang, Xie Decai, Xie Heming, Lan Dingshou, Lei Xingping, Cai Renshan, Zang Wenqing, Pei Huailiang, Liao Xilong, Tan Shilu, Tan Dongsheng, Miao Guoliang, Teng Wanming, Pan Hongmei, Dai Xuejiang, Wei Boliang, Mi Zhenyu	267	
1998	9th	Ding Yucai, Ding Zhaogan (Hui), Ding Shouyue, Bu Qingjun, Yu Yongbo (Manchu), Yu Zhenwu, Ma Weidong (Tibetan), Ma Weiming, Ma Diansheng, Wang Renyin, Wang Wenhui, Wang Yongning, Wang Wei, Wang Zhicheng, Wang Zhixue, Wang Zhihao, Wang Ke, Wang Liangwang, Wang Yingzhou, Wang Guotian, Wang Yumin, Wang Zemin, Wang Guiqin, Wang Xian, Wang Zuxun, Wang Tongye, Wang Tao, Wang Qi, Wang Ruilin, Wang Xinfeng, Mao Yongze, Fang Denghua, Kong Xiangqiang, Ba Zhongtan, Deng Yongliang, Deng Hong, Deng Changyou, Deng Hongmo, Shi Baoyuan, Lu Puyang, Lu Denghua, Ye Aiqun, Tian Shugen, Tian Shaoqi, Shi Yuxiao, Shi Yongshan, Bai Lianhe (Manchu), Lan Baojing, Nurman Kerim (Uyghur) (Ethnic minorities), Ji Zhijun, Qu Fanghuan, Zhu Wenquan, Zhu Yongqing, Xian Kairun, Ren Liwei, Ren Peiyu, Liu Jiujun, Liu Changfu, Liu Shuming, Liu Yongzhi, Liu Yahong, Liu Zhiyan, Liu Mingpu, Liu Yinchao, Liu Zhenlai (Hui), Liu Fengjun, Xu Zhilong, Xu Sheng, Sun Zhaoqun, Sun Zhiqiang, Sun Liying (Manchu), Sun Zhongtong, Sun Chengjun, Sun Tang, Du Tiehuan, Li Jiulong, Li Fengzhou, Li Wenguang, Li Yongzhong, Li Yongtai (Korean), Li Yongde, Li Tongmao, Li Laizhu, Li Bing, Li Xianyu (Korean), Li Bingqiao, Li Xuetong, Li Chunhe, Li Suping, Li Xiaokun, Li En, Li Xinliang, Li Heng, Yang Shulong, Yang Yushu, Yang Weiyan, Yang Yunzhong, Yang Li, Yang YingchangYang Xuejun, Yang Chaokuan, Yang Rongya, Yang Yigang, Yang Chengyu, Xiao Xingming, Shi Quan, Wu Lingling (Hui nationality), Wu Jike, Qiu Jinkai, Qiu Yanhan, Qiu Jian, He Naiming, He Shibiao, He Ping, He Shanfu, Gu Shanqing, Zou Yongzhao, Wang Deyuan, Wang Chaohai, Shen Rongjun, Shen Xiaohui, Shen Xuezai, Shen Shanwen, Song Wenhan, Song Zuying (female, Miao nationality), Song Qingwei, Chi Haotian, Zhang Wannian, Zhang Renzhong, Zhang Wentai, Zhang Dongsheng, Zhang Lizhi, Zhang Yining, Zhang Jinbao, Zhang Lianzhong, Zhang Xiguang, Zhang Xusan, Zhang Guochu, Zhang Mingyuan, Zhang Xuedong, Zhang Baokang, Zhang Shuyun, Zhang Shutian, Zhang Zhenhua, Zhang Li, Zhang Haitian, Zhang Miansheng, Zhang Zhi, Lu Fengbin, Chen Kai Li, Chen Yujie, Chen Zhenghan, Chen Qingyun, Chen Mingshan, Chen Xianhua, Chen Zhangyuan, Chen Tianlin, Chen Jinbiao, Chen Cuiping, Chen Qian, Fan Changlong, Lin Yongnian, Ou Jingu, Yue Xuanyi, Jin Renxie (Korean), Jin Guage (Yi), Jin Mao, Jin Changji (Korean), Zhou Youliang, Zhou Wenyuan, Zhou Keyu, Zhou Kunren, Zhou Meihua, Zhou Yuqi, Zheng Shenxia, Zheng Shichao, Zheng Shouzeng, Zheng Jinlei, Zheng Bingqing, Zheng Hongtao, Zhao Weiguo, Zhao Yuexin, Zhao Shuyue, Zhao Keming, Zhao Cong (Manchu), Zhao Xinglu, Zhao Yingfu, Zhao Guojun, Zhao Shuanlong, Zhao Rongtang, Zhao Xinxian, Hu Shixiang, Hu Chunfu, Hu Ailing, Liu Fengju, Zhong Shengqin, Hou Gang, Shi AntingLosang Chodron (Tibetan), Gong Yunzhan, Luo Zhengping, Qin Jiangchang, Yuan Xinghua, Geng Lianfeng, Nie Li, Mo Sihai (Zhuang), Jia Danbing, Jia Wenxian, Jia Maorong, Jia Fukun, Xu Youyin, Xu Chengyun, Xu Zhenzhong, Xu Genchu, Xu Huizi, Gao Tongsheng, Gao Shouwei, Guo Fengqi, Guo Yuxiang, Tang Tianbiao, Huang Yuzhang, Huang Minqiang, Huang Yong (Mongolian), Huang Sujia, Cao Shuangming, Cao Xuede, Qi Qinglun, Gong Huiyun, Cui Yi, Fu Tinggui, Kang Chengyuan, Liang Jiqiu, Liang Bao Jin, Kou Xianxiang, Sui Yongju, Sui Shengwu, Wei Fulin (Manchu), Peng Xiaofeng, Peng Chuzheng (Tujia), Peng Cuifeng, Ge Chengwen, Ge Zhenfeng, Dong Liangju, Han Shengfeng, Han Jinbao, Han Ruijie, Su Rongsheng (Dong), Jing Xueqin, Cheng Baoshan, Cheng Xiaojian, Fu Quanyou, Fu Hongji, Fu Bohai, Fu Cuihe, Tong Tianyun, Wen Yuzhu, Wen Guangchun, Xie Guang, Pu Rongxiang, Meng Jinxi, Zhan Zhongfu, Cai Renshan, Cai Jibiao, Zang Wenqing, Xiong Ziren, Fan Genshen, Wei Chang'an	268	
2003	10th	Ding Jiye, Yu Changhai, Yu Yongyue (Manchu), Yu Huaimou, Yu Guisheng, Yu Changqi, Wan Rangxin, Ma Yizhi, Ma Shuming, Ma Guowen, Ma Diansheng, Wang Yibin, Wang Tailan, Wang Wencheng, Wang Wenhui, Wang Yufa, Wang Yongliang, Wang Wei, Wang Shouye, Wang Shouzhi, Wang Liangwang, Wang Maorun, Wang Guosheng, Wang Mingsheng, Wang Jinxiang, Wang Dingqing, Wang Hongguang, Wang Zuxun, Wang Hewen, Wang Zhenxi, Wang Lianying (female), Wang Xiangfu, Wang Xibin, Wang Hui, Zhaxi Duji (Tibetan), Mao Fengming, Feng Jingquan, Fang Renying (Zhuang), Fang Qingling, Yin Qingli, Yin Baosheng (Bai), Deng Wei (female, Manchu), Deng Xiaohong, Ai Husheng, Shen Wansheng, Tian Shugen, Tian Shaoqi, Shi Yu Xiao, Feng Zhaoju, Xing Shucheng, Xing Shizhong, Lü Zhi, Lü Dengming, Lü Desong, Zhu Qi, Zhu Ruiyun, Zhu Shuguang, Ren Zhitong, Liu Guangzhi, Liu Weidong, Liu Fengshan, Liu Shucai, Liu Qide, Liu Baosheng, Liu Yanchao (female), Liu Guishu, Liu Jian (Tibetan), Liu Fengjun, Liu Zhanzhi, Liu Bin, Yan Zhanggeng, Jiangsu Ping (female), Tang Yuying (female), Qi Zhengxiang, Xu Jiwen, Xu Hezhen, Ruan Chaoyang, Sun Dafa, Sun Fengyang, Sun Jianguo, Su Shuyan, Du Yunsheng, Du Tiehuan, Li Guangqi, Li Tianze, Li Yuanzheng, Li Shaojun, Li Bixing, Li Yongjin, Li Yongde, Li Guanglu, Li Maifu, Li Qisheng, Li Guohui, Li Xuezhi, Li Ke (Manchu), Li Jun (female)Li Hongcheng, Li Suping (female), Li En, Li Tiemin, Li Jinai, Li Xinguang, Li Xinliang, Li Zenglin, Yang Dongsheng, Yang Yegong, Yang Xuhua, Yang Guoliang, Yang Liu (female), Yang Rongya (female), Yang Jianying (female), Xiao Yuguo, Wu Zhengdan (female), Wu Qingtian, Wu Shengli, Wu Miansheng, Wu Zhaohui (Dong ethnic group), Qiu Daxiong, Qiu Rulin, Qiu Jian, Yu Gongbao (Tibetan ethnic group), Leng Kuan, Wang Yu, Wang Zhiyuan, Wang Chaoqun, Shen Yongping, Song Chunli (female), Chu Ping, Chi Wanchun, Zhang Wentai, Zhang Shuanghu, Zhang Shigang, Zhang Shixian, Zhang Yongyi, Zhang Jun, Zhang Yang, Zhang Jinbao, Zhang Zhibing, Zhang Jiechuan, Zhang Zhixin, Zhang Xuedong, Zhang Qiuxiang, Zhang Rui, Zhang Zengshun, Chen Fangshu, Chen Yutian Chen Shijun, Chen Zuoning (female), Chen Dazhi, Chen Shibao, Chen Xitao, Chen Guoshu, Chen Sisi (female), Chen Yan, Chen Zhangyuan, Fan Yinhua, Fan Xiaoguang, Lin Kang (Zhuang), Ou Xinmin, Luo Yudong, Luo Zhenjiang, Luo Liewen, Kuai Wanzeng, Zhou Youliang, Zhou Hanrong, Zhou Kunren, Zhou Yuebang (Tibetan), Pang Weiyi, Zheng Shouzeng, Zheng Zhongtang, Zheng Zhidong, Qu Quansheng, Zhao Taizhong, Zhao Zhimin (Manchu), Zhao Keshi, Zhao Jianzhong, Zhao Chengfeng, Zhao Mei (female, Gelao), Zhao Shantong, Zhao Xijun, Hao Jingmin, Hao Daohai, Hu Shixiang, Yao Libo (female), Zhan Yongsheng, Zhong Minghui, Duan Luding, Duan Shuchun, Jiang Jichu, Jiang Yanji, Yao Yunzhu (female), Yao Nianxue, Yuan BanggenYuan Jiaxin, Jia Danbing (female), Jia Maorong, Jia Xiaowei, Jia Fukun, Xia Guofu, Xia Yanhua, Gu Jincai, Gu Huisheng, Chai Jiake, Qian Hanxin (female), Qian Nanzhong, Tie Jin (female, Hui), Xu Caihou, Xu Xiaoyan, Xu Lizheng, Xu Yongqing, Xu Genchu, Xu Xiaonan, Xu Fenlin, Gao Shouwei, Gao Lianqi (Manchu), Guo Wa·Jia Maoji (female, Tibetan), Guo Weimin, Guo Lifeng, Guo Boxiong, Guo Hongchao, Guo Guirong, Xi Jihu, Tang Tianbiao, Tang Xinqiu, Tu Yaqing, Tao Bojun, Tao Changlian, Huang Guanghan, Huang Cisheng Huang Zuoxing, Huang Xuelu, Huang Xinsheng, Huang Gaocheng, Huang Xin, Cao Gangchuan, Cao Huichen, Qi Jianguo, Chang Xianqi, Chang Guixiang, Cui Wenge, Yan Weiwen, Liang Guanglie, Chen Hongchang, Sui Shengwu, Wei Fulin (Manchu), Dong Wanrui, Dong Zhen, Jing Xueqin, Cheng Xiaojian (female), Fu Jianan, Jiao Anchang, Zeng Jianguo, Zeng Haisheng (female), Zeng Jiao, Wen Guangchun, Chu Hongyan, Cai Chaoyuan, Liao Xilong, Saimaiti Maimaiti (Uyghur), Tan Naida, Tan Dongsheng, Tan Yuexin, Pan Hongliang, Huo Xiaoyong, Dai Qingmin, Wei Pingsheng, Wei Jizhang .	268	
2008	11th	Ding Laihang, Ding Mingde, Ding Xiaobing, Ding Jiye, Xi Hailing (female), Ma Weiming, Ma Jianguo, Ma Xiangsheng, Ma Ruiqi, Wang Jiurong, Wang Shengshan, Wang Wenrong, Wang Shiping, Wang Ping, Wang Xixin, Wang Jianmin (Lanzhou Military Region), Wang Jianmin (Chengdu Military Region), Wang Jianjun, Wang Hongyao, Wang Guanzhong, Wang Hewen, Wang Yong (Manchu), Wang Li (female), Wang Xiaolong, Wang Xiaodong, Wang Xiaodong (Manchu), Wang Jitang, Wang Mengyun, Wang Qingbao, Wang Weishan, Wang Weijun (female), Wang Sentai, Wang Hui, Wang Qian, Wang Dengping, Wang Fushan, You Haitao, Ju Xiaocheng, Niu Hongguang, Deng Wei (female, Manchu), Tian Wei (Tujia), Ran Chongwei, Bai Yonghui, Bai Zixing, Cong Rigang, Feng Zhengjie, Su Fu Cheng, Lü Jun (Naxi), Lü Jihong, Zhu Wenyu, Zhu Wenquan, Zhu Qi, Zhu Fachen, Zhu Hongda, Zhu Qingyi, Zhu Jinlin, Zhu Shuguang, Xiang Nanlin, Wu Huayang, Liu Jukui, Liu Dongdong, Liu Yongzhi, Liu Yahong, Liu Weiwei, Liu Jilin, Liu Jichen, Liu Zhongxing, Liu Xin, Liu Xueyun, Liu Sheng, Liu Yong, Liu Zhenqi, Liu Xiaokun, Liu Xiaocui (female), Liu Lianhua, Liu Dingxing, Liu Bin, Liu Lei, Liu Zhenwu, Qi Sanping, Guan Kai, Jiang Jianzeng, Jiang Yongxirao (Tibetan), Tang Ziyue, Xu Qiliang, Ruan Zhibai, Sun Dafa, Sun Zhenglu, Sun Zhongtong, Rui Qingkai, Su Shuyan, Du Jianlin, Li Xiaoying (female), Li Shaojun, Li Changshun, Li Danyang (female), Li Danni (female), Li Yu,Li Benqi, Li Lantian, Li Guangjin, Li Qingan, Li Zuocheng, Li Xianfu (Miao), Li Guohui, Li Chang, Li Zheng (Manchu), Li Jinshan, Li Xuewen, Li Xuezhong, Li Xuezhi, Li Jianhua, Li Zhongmin (Hui), Li Jun (female), Li Jinai, Li Qianyuan, Li Dianren, Yang Jigui, Yang Zhiqi, Yang Guohai, Yang Jian, Yang Rongya (female), Yang Deqing, Wu Shuangzhan, Wu Qi, Wu Shengli, He Xinying (female), Yu Peijun, Xin Rongguo, Wang Yu, Wang Chaoqun, Wang Rui (female), Song Qiwen, Song Shanyu, Chi Wanchun, Zhang Wentai, Zhang Shibao, Zhang Xuncai, Zhang Huachen, Zhang Xiaozhong, Zhang Wei, Zhang Yueyong, Zhang Yulin, Zhang Xuefeng, Zhang Baoshu, Zhang Shiming, Zhang Jianqi Zhang Jiangfei, Zhang Lieying, Zhang Ye, Zhang Jun, Zhang Rui, Zhang Deshun, Chen Erxi, Chen Xiaogong, Chen Guangming, Chen Xitao, Chen Lin, Chen Guotao, Chen Shuwei, Chen Bingde, Chen Zhangyuan, Miao Hua, Yuan Shijun, Fan Changmi, Lin Guangchang, Lin Yongqing, Yue Huilai, Jin Mao, Zhou Xiaozhou, Zhou Liangzhu, Zhou Bin, Zhou Ruihua, Zhou Bihua (female), Zheng Shenxia, Zheng Chuanfu, Zheng Xican (female), Guan Quecaidan (Tibetan), Fang Fenghui, Zhao Keming, Zhao Gang, Zhao Qibao (Manchu), Zhao Xiaoming, Zhao Hui, Zhao Xijun, Hu Xiutang, Hu Yishu, Hu Yanlin, Jiang Jichu, Jiang Futang, Qin Weijiang, Qin Yu (Tujia), Gui Hengshan, Jia Zhengping, Jia Yongsheng, Jia Yanming, Jia XiaoweiXia Shifu, Xia Guofu, Gu Shoucheng, Gu Bingyue (Manchu), Chai Shaoliang, Qian Nanzhong, Xu Caihou, Xu Xiaoyan, Xu Shuxiong, Xu Hongmeng, Xu Genchu, Xu Dexue, Xu Lei (female), Gao Fenglou, Gao Shouwei, Guo Shuhong, Guo Boxiong, Tang Wanlin (Mongolian), Tang Tianbiao, Tang Taiping, Tang Guoqing, Tan Wenhu, Huang Xiaojuan (female), Huang Xianzhong, Huang Jiaxiang, Cao Dongshen, Cao Guoqing, Cao Qing, Qi Jianguo, Chang Wanquan, Cui Yuling (female), Cui Jinglong, Fu Tinggui, Yan Hongzhi, Yan Baojian, Liang Guanglie, Liang Xiaojing (Female), Kou Tie, Sui Mingtai, Peng Xiaofeng, Ge Zhenfeng, Dong Deyuan, Jiang Chong'an, Han Yanlin, Su Yongping (female), Su Rongsheng (Dong ethnicity), Yu Linxiang, Ji Shaoying, Cheng Xiaojian (female), Jiao Honghui, Shu Yutai, Zeng Zhanping, Zeng Qingzhu, Zeng Manjun, Xie Jianhua, Chu Hongyan, Qiu Shanshan (female), Lei Mingqiu, Jian Shilong, Bao Juntao, Jing Zhiyuan, Pei Huailiang, Liao Bingsheng, Liao Xilong, Sayramjan Saydula (Uyghur ethnicity), Tan Jing (female), Fan Daiming, Yan Jixiong, Mu Zhenhe, Wei Dongpu, Wei Gang	268	
2013	12th	Ding Laihang, Ding Haichun, Ding Jiye, Ma Weiming, Ma Qiuxing, Ma Xiaotian, Wang Li, Wang Jiurong, Wang Yi, Wang Wenjie, Wang Fang (female, Mongolian), Wang Dong, Wang Dongming, Wang Yongsheng, Wang Huayong, Wang Zhaoyu, Wang Jun, Wang Guosheng, Wang Mingxiao, Wang Zhongxin, Wang Bo, Wang Jianmin, Wang Jianguo, Wang Jianchang, Wang Shu, Wang Hongyao, Wang Na (female), Wang Zhenguo, Wang Li (female), ~~Wang Xiaojun~~, Wang Hailong, Wang Xiangfu, Wang Weiming, Wang Weijun (female), Wang Xibin, Wang Chaotian, Wang Hui, Ju Xiaocheng, Niu Bingxiang, Wen Min (female), Deng Wei (female, Manchu), Deng Changyou, Li Yanming, Long Yihe, ~~Zhan~~ Guoqiao, Lu Shengjun, Lu Xicheng, Tian Wei (Tujia), Tian ~~Xiusi~~, Tian Xin, Ran Chongwei, Bai Wenqi (Mongolian) Bai Jianjun, Si Qifu, Rong Guiqing, Xixima (Tibetan), Qu Haiyan (female), Lü Dingwen, Lü Jihong, Lü Yueguang, Zhu Yuqing (female), Zhu Fazhong, Zhu Xiaoyun (female), Ren Wande, Hua Ming, Xiang Nanlin, Zhuang Kezhu, Liu Yunhai, Liu Congliang, Liu Wenli (female), Liu Shilei (female, Manchu), ~~Liu Dongdong~~, Liu Chengjun, Liu Lianchang, Liu Zhuoming, Liu Guolong, Liu Guozhi, Liu Zhong, Liu Shaoliang, Liu Yang (female), Liu Zhenli, Liu Zhenlai (Hui), Liu Zhenqi, Liu Xiaojiang, Liu Xiaocui (female), ~~Liu Zheng~~, Liu Huanmin, Liu Lianhua, Liu Lei, Liu Xin, Liu Yuan, Liu Fulian, Yan Yongxiang, Mihelunsha Abudu (female, Uyghur), Jiang Yongxirao (Tibetan), Xu Wei, Xu Qiliang, Xu LinpingXu Yong, Sun Dafa, Sun Laishen, Sun Herong, Sun Sijing, Mou Mingbin, Ji Haiquan, Du Benyin, Du Hongqiang, Du Hengyan, Li Xiaoying (female), Li Changcai, Li Danni (female), Li Fengshan, Li Fengbiao, Li Wengang, Li Shiming, Li Guangju, Li Tingwei (Tujia ethnic group), Li Andong, Li Xianyu (female, Korean ethnic group), Li Aiping, Li Qingyin, Li Qinghe, Li Bin, Li Qiang, Yang Dongming, Yang Chengxi, Yang Jianhua, Yang Jianting, Wu Guohua, Wu Shengli, Qiu Wenming, He Yinghua, Wang ~~Yu~~, Wang Jinyu, Wang Jianxin, Song Qiwen, Song Kun, Song Shanyu, Song Puxuan, Chi Wanchun, Zhang Youxia, Zhang Shuguo, Zhang Shibao, Zhang Yongyi, Zhang Junxiang, ~~Zhang Yang~~, Zhang Wei, Zhang Yuting, ~~Zhang Ming~~, Zhang Jincheng, Zhang Yulin, Zhang Jianping, Zhang Jianhua, Zhang Feng, Zhang Ye, Zhang Haiyang, Zhang Zhannan, Chen Xiaogong, Chen Pinghua, Chen Dongdeng, Chen Zaifang, Chen Xiangdong, Chen Zhou, Chen Honghai, Chen ~~Lin~~, Chen Jie, Chen Guoling, Chen Xueli, Chen Jinhua, Chen Wei (female), Miao Runqi, Fan Changlong, Shang Yaqin (female, Manchu), Angwang Sonam (Tibetan), Luo Changkun, Luo Gaji (Tibetan), Luo Fuchen, Zhou Xiaozhou, Zhou Hanjiang, Zhou Xingming, ~~Zhou Laiqiang~~, Zhou Linhe, Zhou Yanqing (female, Buyi), Zheng Shuicheng, Zheng Chuanfu, Zheng He, Zheng Hui, Shan Shouqin (female), Lang Youliang, Lang Jianzhao, Fang Fenghui, Meng Li (female), Zhao Keshi, Zhao Zhongxin, Hao Gaochao, Hu Xiutang, Hu Xiubin, Halimurati Abudureheman (Uyghur), Zhong Zhiming, Hou Jizhen, Rao Kaixun (Hui), Jiang Yong, Jiang Yuanchao, Fei Ling (female), He Jiangbo, He Yuan (Miao), Qin Weijiang, Qin Shengxiang, Qin Baozhong, Yuan Qiang, Mo Junpeng, Jia Danbing (female), Jia Xiaowei, Xu Hongliang, Xu Jianzhong, Xu Chaoguang, Ling Feng, Gao Guanghui, Gao Shangguo, Gao Chao, Guo Liyun, Guo Junbo, Tang Hong, Tan Weihong, Huang Hanbiao, Huang Yongjian (female), Huang Liangping, Huang Yuejin, Huang Xianzhong, Cao Yimin Cao Qing, Sheng Bin, Chang Wanquan, Chang Tianqing, Cui Yuling (female), Cui Yongjun, Kang Fei, Zhang Qinsheng, Liang Xu, Liang Xiaojing (female), Dong Zeping, Jiang Ganlin, Han Weiguo, Han Yanlin, Han Qingbo, Han Yu, Jing Wenchun, Shu Qingyou, Xie Zhengyi, Xie Jianhua, Xie Hong, Xie Xiaobo, Bao Juntao, Chu Hongbin, Cai Hongxia (female), Lin Aqiang, Tan Youjin, Tan Jian, Tan Jing (female), Xiong Jiajun, Yan Jiangang, Xue Guoqiang, Xue Aiguo, ~~Dai Yunpeng~~, Dai Xuguang, Dai Shaoan (Mongolian), Dai Hongsheng, Wei Fenghe	268	
2018	13th	Ding Laihang, Ding Guolin, Yu Zhijian, Yu Zhongfu, Yu Feng (Manchu, transferred to Liaoning delegation), Yu Wei (female), Xi Chaofeng, Ma Weiming, Ma Hepali (female, Kazakh), Ma Shunnan, Wang Li, Wang Xiaoming, Wang Tianmu, Wang Changjiang, Wang Changhe, Wang Wenquan, Wang Fang (female, Mongolian), Wang Xuanyu, Wang Ning, Wang Yaping (female), Wang Zaijie, Wang Chengnan, Wang Wei, Wang Quanli, Wang Jun, Wang Xiufeng, Wang Qifan, Wang Guoxin (Mongolian), Wang Mingxiao, Wang Bo, Wang Baohua (female), Wang Jianguo, Wang Shu, Wang Fuxing (Naxi), Wang Hongyao, Wang Na (female), Wang Zhenguo, Wang Xiaoxia (female), Wang Jian (female), Wang Hai, Wang Haidou, Wang Hailong, Wang Jiasheng, Wang Jiaocheng, Wang Huishan, Wang Huiqing, Wang Xianjun, Fang Xiang, Yin Dong, Yin Dejian, Kong Jun, Gu Qingyue (female), Li Yanming, Shi Xiangyuan, Shi XiaoYe Qing、Tian ZhongliangTian Xuefeng, Fu Ning (female), Fu Guoqiang, Bai Wenqi (Mongolian), Feng Wei, Feng Yi, Lan Zheng, Rong Guiqing, Zhu Zhengyou, Zhu Cheng, Zhu Cheng, Zhu Fuhai, Zhuang Bingkun, Liu Riming, Liu Shilei (female, Manchu), Liu Yonggang, Liu Yongjian, Liu Guangbin, Liu Wei, Liu Weixiu, Liu Xu, Liu Jixing, Liu Jingju (female), Liu Shaoliang, Liu Jian, Liu Jiaguo, Liu Yuejun, Liu Yuan, Liu Dewei, Qi Huguang, Mihelunsha Abudu (female, Uyghur), An Zhaoqing (Xibe), Xu Liqiang, Xu Qiliang, Xu Zhongfa, Sun Jianguo, Sun Jian, Yan Feng, Su Baocheng, Du Gang, Du Gang, Li Shisheng, Li Yongsheng, Li Wei Li Jun, Li Yuntian, Li Xiubao, Li Zuocheng, Li Shangfu, Li Ming, Li Yong, Li Hong (female), Li Chao, Li Daoming, Yang Yang (female, Miao), Yang Chengxi, Yang Lixia (female, Bai), Yang Chugexi (Tibetan), Yang Zheng, Yang Cheng, Yang Qian (female), Yang Xiangguo, Yang Lei (Tujia), Xiao Dongsong, Wu Shaohua, Wu Yongliang, Wu Xingfeng, Wu Shezhou, Wu Jieming, Wu Guohua, Wu Changjie (female), Wu Chunli, Wu Haibo, Wu Yingxia (female), Qiu Yuechao, He Weidong, He Renxue, He Hongjun, He Lei, Yu Hailong, Leng Zhiyi, Xin Chongdong, Xin Yi, Wang Haijiang, Sha Zixia (Yi), Shen Jinlong, Song DanSong XueSong Chunli, Song Kun, Song Shanyu, Song Puxuan, Zhang Youxia, Zhang Xiaoyan (female), Zhang Yihu, Zhang Shengmin, Zhang Wenren, Zhang Ping, Zhang Mingzhu (female), Zhang Xueyu, Zhang Xuefeng, Zhang Hongying (female), Zhang Honghe, Zhang Lieying, Zhang Xiongwei, Zhang Xiao (female), Abdukerim Halik (Uyghur), Chen Pinghua, Chen Xiangmei (female), Chen Junlin, Chen Jianfei, Chen Bingyan, Chen Yong, Chen Jiajing, Chen Xueli, Chen Daoxiang, Chen Liming, Wu Wen, Wu Zhongliang, Miao Hua, Miao Runqi, Fan Chengcai, Fan Xiaojun, Luo Yazhong, Zhou Fenglin (Bai), Zhou Yaning, Zhou Wugang, Zhou Songhe, Zhou Jianbo, Zhou Jian, Zheng Weiping, Zheng Junjie, Zheng Hao, Baolin (Mongolian), Lang Youliang,Meng ZhongkangJiangba Kezhu (Tibetan), Zhao Yanquan, Zhao Zongqi, Zhao He, Zhao Ruibao, Hu Changming, Zhan Houshun, Zhong Zhiming, Zhong Shaojun, Hou Yun, Hou Shenliang, ~~Rao Kaixun (Hui nationality)~~, Jiang Guoping, Jiang Yong, Qin Shengxiang, Yuan Yuan (female), Yuan Yubai, Mo Junpeng, Suolang Zhaxi (Tibetan), Jia Ting'an, Jia Jiancheng, Jia Junming, Gu Xiangbing, Chai Shaoliang, Dang Zenglong, Qian Shumin, Xu Yunpeng, Xu Xisheng, ~~Xu Xianghua~~, Xu Xinglin, Xu Jianfeng, Xu Qiling, Yin Fanglong, Ling Xi, Ling Huanxin, Gao Donglei, Gao Bo, Guo Xiaodong (Mongolian), Guo Puxiao, Tu Weiming, Huang Kechao, Huang Lianzhen (female), Huang Ming, Huang Xin, Cao Guohou, Cao Jingyi (female), Cao Xinyuan, Cui Yuling (female), Kang Chunyuan, Kang Xiaohui, Liang Yang, Liang Jiantao (female), Peng Bo, Dong Zhenghong, Jiang Yongxin (female), Jiang Qingqun, Jiang Jianxin, Jiang Moxiang, Han Weiguo, Han Xiaodong, Han Peng, Cheng Jian, Cheng Cheng (female), Xie Zhengyi, Xie Yiping, Pu Yongneng, Cai Hongxia (female), Guan Yanmi, Liao Zhenliang, Tan Benhong, Tan Min, ~~Miao Zhong~~, Miao Jing (female), Fan Daiming, Li Huohui, Pan Jiaying (female), Wei Fenghe	269	
2023	14th	Ding Wenqi, Ding Laifu, Ding Yi, Yu Zhongfu, Ma Guodong, Ma Baochuan, Ma Yiming, Feng Yan, Wang Dazhong, Wang Xiaoming, Wang Renhua, Wang Wenhua, Wang Wenyi, Wang Donghai, Wang Liyan, Wang Ning, Wang Yaru, Wang Chengnan, Wang Zhongcai, Wang Kangping, Wang Xiuhui, Wang Hongyu, Wang Jianwu, Wang Li, Wang Feng, Wang Lei, Wang Kunlong, Wang Peng, Ju Gansheng, Mao Dekun, Gong Maodong, Wen Xiaoliang, Fang Xiang, Yin Hongxing, Ai Yingchun, Gu Qingyue, Buhetumur, Dongzhu Cailang, Ye Dabing, Shen Feng, Shen Dongchu, Tian Yixiang, Shi Shuhe, Fu Guoqiang, Bai Zhongbin, Feng Jianhua, Feng Min, Bian Ruifeng, Xing Pengfeng Geely, Lü Yuncheng, Lü Xianchun, Zhu Yuemeng, Qiao Xiangji, Qiao Shasha, Liu Zizhu, Liu Wenqi, Liu Donglin, Liu Zhihong, Liu Yang, Liu Zejin, Liu Zhian, Liu Zongcheng, Liu Zheng, Liu Shuwei, Liu Wei, Liu Yang, Liu Zhenli, Liu Jiaguo, Liu Min, Liu Xihe, Liu Feng, An Zhaoqing, An Xue, Qi Weiguang, Xu Xueqiang, Ruan Ting, Sun Danping, Sun Xueshuang, Sun Lei, Ji Duo, Ji Changliang, Su Yinsheng, Du Changyu, Li Fengbiao, Li Dong, Li Pu, Li Wei, Li Gang, Li Wanxin, Li Zhao, Li Junjie, Li Yong, Li Qiaoming, Li Bin, Li Yuanyuan, Li Peng, Li Pengyi, Yang Zhenggen, Yang Guang, Yang GuanghuiYang Zichun, Yang Zhibin, Yang Zhiqiang, Yang Xiaoxiang, Xiao Tianliang, Xiao Wei, Wu Shengyan, Wu Xingfeng, Wu Jieming, Wu Yuhong, Wu Junbao, Wu Xihua, He Weidong, He Ping, He Hongjun, He Yufan, He Hongxing, Wang Hongyan, Shen Fangwu, Shen Jinlong, Song Xiaoou, Song Caiping, Zhang Youxia, Zhang Fandi, Zhang Gong, Zhang Shengmin, Zhang Longfei, Zhang Pingkun, Zhang Dongxu, Zhang Like, Zhang Yongqiang, Zhang Faju, Zhang Jun, Zhang Hongbing, Zhang Heng, Zhang Minghua, Zhang Hongxing, Zhang Hongbin, Zhang Huiyun, Zhang Shaoying, Zhang Xiao, Lu Danyun, Ayden Tursunbek, Chen Yipeng, Chen Guangjun, Chen Huan, Chen Lianbing, Chen Song, Chen Guo Qiang, Chen Jinlan, Chen Xuebin, Chen Weiwei, Chen Hongyu, Chen Jiahong, Chen Hui, Chen Jing, Chen Yu, Chen Demin, Chen Cheng, Chen Wei, Fan Xiaojun, Luo Yu, Luo Shengke, Isif Ikya, Zhou Bikuan, Zhou Gang, Zhou Fen, Zhou Shenggang, Zhou Yuan, Zheng Weiping, Zheng Yuanlin, Zheng Jin, Zheng Lingyong, Zheng Hao, Wan Jinyang, Meng Qingbin, Zhao Jufeng, Zhao Zhidan, Zhao Song, Zhao Xianfu, Zhao Zhong, Zhao Jianmin, Zhao Jun, Zhao Xiumin, Zhao Heng, Zhao Yongsheng, Zhao Ruibao, Zhao Lei, Hao Wanlu, Hao Jingwen, Hu Gangfeng, Hu Xi, Liu Qixu, Zhong Shaojun, Huangfu Haitao, Hou Changling, Jiang Hanmin, Jiang Xiaodong, Yao Dangnai, Yao NanYao Yao, He Xingbo, He Rongguo, He Tingting, Luo Yuan, Qin Tian, Qin Shengxiang, Yuan Wei, Yuan Yubai, Nie Songlai, Suolang Gongbu, Jia Zhigang, Xia Xiaoping, Gu Xiangbing, Dang Zenglong, Xu Liqian, Xu Anxiang, Xu Fengcan, Xu Zhongbo, Ling Huanxin, Gao Zhongqiang, Gao Wei, Gao Ling, Gao Rui, Guo Jianjun, Guo Puxiao, Tang Xinghua, Tang Wuxiang, Tang Linhui, Hai Jinhang, Cao Jingyi, Chang Dingqiu, Cui Yuling, Cui Daohu, Liang Xiaojing, Liang Lei, Peng Chen, Peng Wanqin, Ge Weiqian, Dong Li, Dong Jun, Jiang Linfeng, Han Shengyan, Han Xiaodong, Qin Jiale, Cheng Jian, Cheng Cheng, Fu Youyao, Fu Xiao, Lai Ruxin, Pei Xiaochang, Xiong Zhaoyuan, Li Xiang, Pan Gaofeng, Xue Hongwei, Dai Sarula, Wei Wenbo, Wei Yuying	281	
