= Wang Hai (admiral) =

Chinese military personnel

- 王海
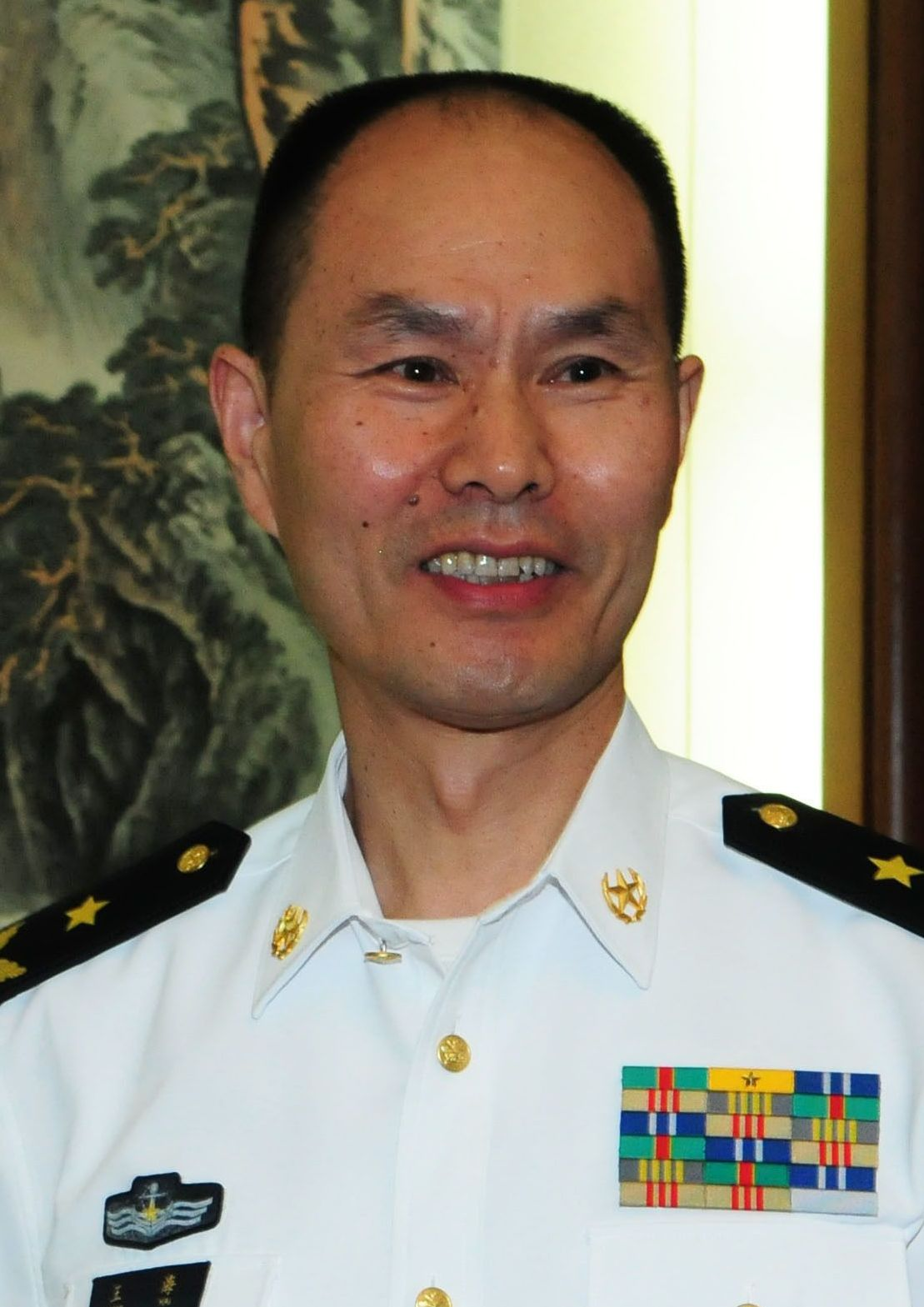
- Wang Hai in 2016

Commander of the South Sea Fleet
- In office January 2017 – February 2023
- Preceded by: Shen Jinlong
- Succeeded by: Ju Xinchun

Deputy Commander of the People's Liberation Army Navy
- In office July 2015 – January 2017
- Commander: Wu Shengli
- Preceded by: Du Jingchen

Personal details
- Born: December 1960 (age 65)
- Party: Chinese Communist Party

Military service
- Allegiance: Chinese Communist Party
- Branch/service: People's Liberation Army Navy
- Years of service: ?–present
- Rank: Vice Admiral

Wang Hai (Chinese: 王海; pinyin: Wáng Hǎi; born December 1960) is a vice admiral of the Chinese People's Liberation Army Navy (PLAN). He served as Commander of the South Sea Fleet from 2017 to 2023. He formerly served as a Deputy Commander of the PLA Navy.

== Career ==
Wang Hai served for many years in the PLA Navy's South Sea Fleet. He attained the rank of rear admiral in July 2010. In September 2012, when Liaoning, China's first aircraft carrier was commissioned into service, Wang Hai was named the first commander of its carrier battle group.

In March 2014, Wang became chief of staff of the PLAN's North Sea Fleet, succeeding rear admiral Wei Gang. In July 2015, he was appointed a deputy commander of the PLA Navy.

In August 2015, Wang Hai and Vice Admiral Aleksandr Fedotenkov of the Russian Navy commanded the Joint Sea-2015 (II) in Vladivostok, a joint naval exercise conducted by the Chinese and Russian navies.

In July 2016, he was promoted to the rank of vice admiral (zhong jiang).

Military offices
Preceded by Wei Gang	Chief of Staff of the North Sea Fleet; 2014–2015	Succeeded by Jiang Guoping
Preceded by Shen Jinlong	Commander of the South Sea Fleet; 2017–2023	Succeeded by Ju Xinchun
