= Wei Gang =

Wei Gang, may refer to:

- Wei Gang (Qing dynasty), Chinese military commander during the Sino-French War 1884–1885
- Wei Gang (PLA Navy), a vice admiral in the People's Liberation Army Navy
- Wei Gang (PLA Air Force), a major general in the People's Liberation Army Air Force
- Wei Gang, Chinese politician, former governor of the Dehong Dai and Jingpo Autonomous Prefecture
