= Du Jingchen =

- 杜景臣

Deputy Commander of the People's Liberation Army Navy
- In office August 2014 – July 2015
- Commander: Wu Shengli
- Preceded by: Ding Yiping
- Succeeded by: Wang Hai

Chief of Staff of the People's Liberation Army Navy
- In office December 2010 – July 2014
- Preceded by: Su Shiliang
- Succeeded by: Qiu Yanpeng

Commander of the East Sea Fleet
- In office December 2009 – December 2010
- Preceded by: Xu Hongmeng
- Succeeded by: Su Zhiqian

Personal details
- Born: 1952 (age 73–74) Tancheng, Shandong, China
- Party: Chinese Communist Party
- Education: Dalian Naval Academy

Military service
- Allegiance: China
- Branch/service: People's Liberation Army Navy
- Years of service: ? − 2015
- Rank: Vice-Admiral

Du Jingchen (Chinese: 杜景臣; born 1952) is a retired vice-admiral (zhong jiang) of the People's Liberation Army Navy (PLAN) of China. He served as Deputy Commander and Chief of Staff of the PLAN, and commander of the East Sea Fleet.

== Biography ==
Du Jingchen was born in 1952 in Tancheng County, Shandong Province. He graduated from Dalian Naval Academy.

Du was deputy chief of staff of the Lüshun Naval Base from 2002 to 2003, and participated in the search-and-rescue mission after the China Northern Airlines Flight 6136 crash in the Bohai Bay. He then served as assistant chief of staff of the PLAN from 2003 to 2007, and chief of staff of the PLAN South Sea Fleet from 2007 to 2009. In December 2008, he commanded China's first anti-piracy naval mission to Somalia.

In December 2009, he was promoted to commander of the East Sea Fleet and concurrently deputy commander of the Nanjing Military Region, a sharp rise from a deputy corps-level post in less than two years. He became chief of staff of the PLAN a year later. In August 2014 he was made deputy commander of the PLAN, replacing Ding Yiping, who had reached the mandatory retirement age.

Du attained the rank of rear admiral in July 2005 and vice-admiral in 2011.
