= Jiang Weilie =

Chinese vice admiral

- 蒋伟烈
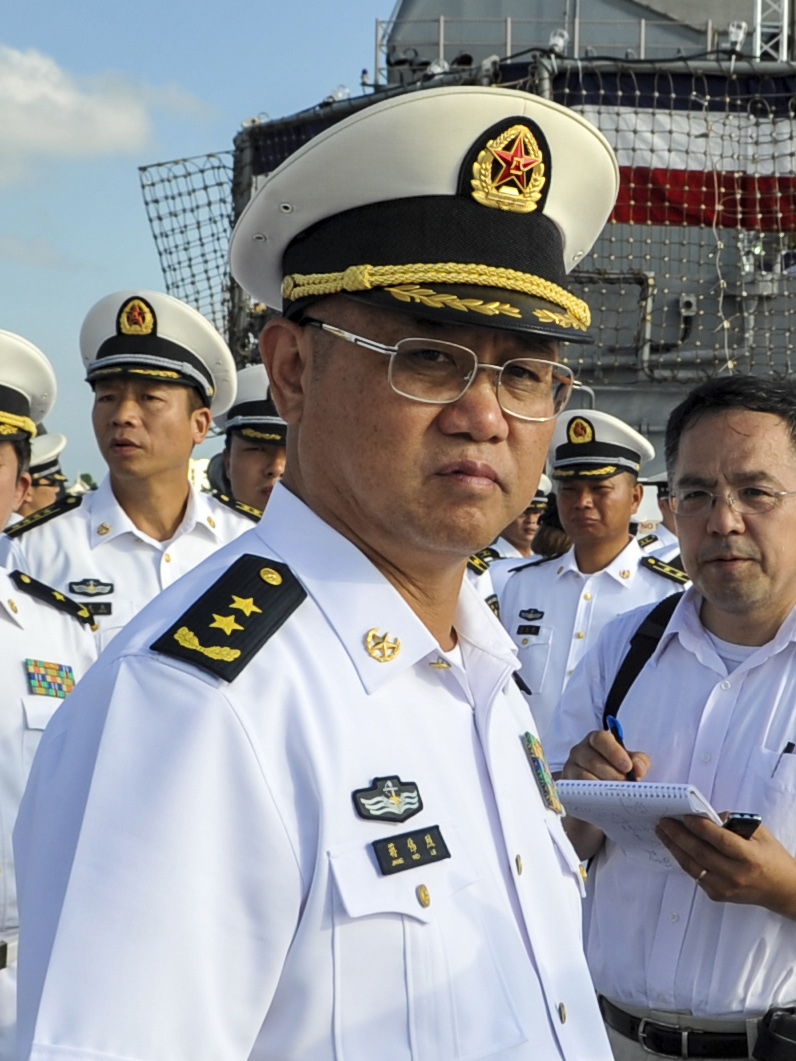
- Jiang in 2013

Deputy Commander of the PLA Navy
- In office December 2014 – April 2017
- Commander: Wu Shengli
- Preceded by: Xu Hongmeng

Commander of the South Sea Fleet
- In office December 2010 – December 2014
- Preceded by: Su Zhiqian
- Succeeded by: Shen Jinlong

Personal details
- Born: November 1955 (age 70) Wujin, Jiangsu, China
- Party: Chinese Communist Party

Military service
- Allegiance: China
- Branch/service: People's Liberation Army Navy
- Years of service: 1975−2017
- Rank: Vice-Admiral

Jiang Weilie (Chinese: 蒋伟烈; born November 1955) is a retired vice-admiral of the People's Liberation Army Navy (PLAN) of China. He served as deputy commander of the PLAN from 2014 to 2017, and formerly served as commander of the South Sea Fleet.

== Biography ==
Jiang Weilie was born in November 1955 in Wujin, Jiangsu Province, and enlisted in the PLAN in 1975.

Jiang spent most of his career in the PLAN's East Sea Fleet. He was promoted to deputy commander of the Shanghai Naval Base in January 2003, before becoming vice president of the PLA Naval Command Academy in December 2003. He then served as deputy commander of the Zhoushan Base from June 2004 to August 2007, commander of the Lüshun Base from 2007 to 2008, chief of staff of the East Sea Fleet from 2008 to 2010, and director of the PLAN Armaments Department from February to November 2010.

In November 2010, Jiang was promoted to commander of the South Sea Fleet, and concurrently deputy commander of the Guangzhou Military Region. In December 2014, he was appointed deputy commander of the PLAN, replacing Xu Hongmeng, who had reached the mandatory retirement age. Shen Jinlong succeeded Jiang as commander of the South Sea Fleet.

Jiang attained the rank of rear admiral in July 2008 and vice-admiral (zhong jiang) in July 2012. He was an alternate of the 18th Central Committee of the Chinese Communist Party.
