= Hou Yuexi =

Chinese admiral

- 侯月喜
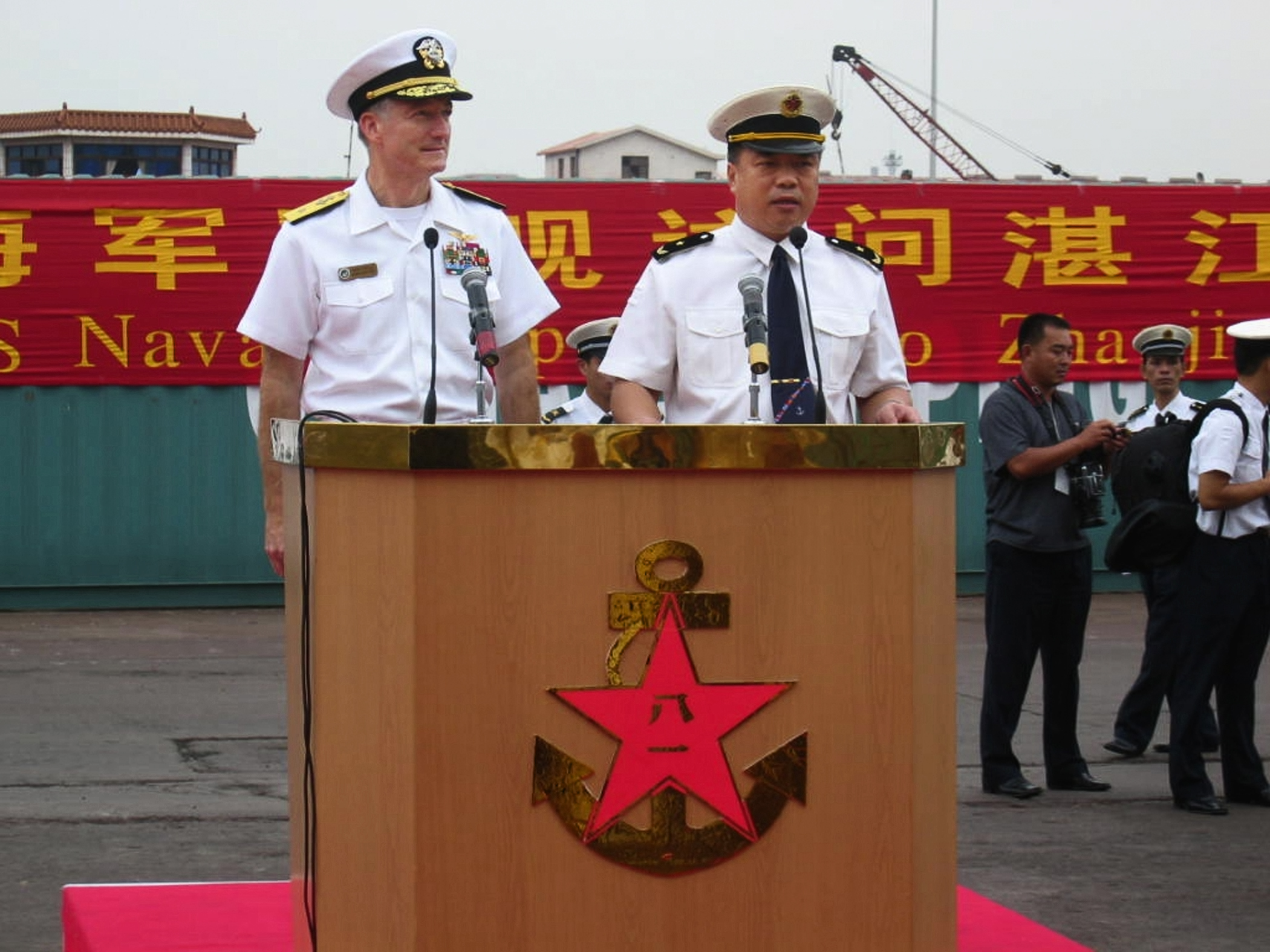
- Rear Adm. James D. Kelly, left, Commander Carrier Group Five, and Hou Yuexi, chief of staff for the Chinese South Sea Fleet.

Assistant Commander of the South Sea Fleet
- Incumbent
- Assumed office July 2006
- Preceded by: Deng Minglin

Chief of Staff for the South Sea Fleet
- In office January 2002 – July 2006
- Preceded by: Huang Jiang
- Succeeded by: Su Zhiqian

Commander of the PLA Shanghai Naval Base
- In office August 1996 – December 2001
- Preceded by: Xiao Dewan

Chief of Staff for the PLA Shanghai Naval Base
- In office October 1992 – August 1996

Personal details
- Born: Yongji, Shanxi, China
- Party: Chinese Communist Party

Military service
- Allegiance: People's Republic of China
- Branch/service: People's Liberation Army Navy
- Rank: Rear Admiral

Hou Yuexi (Chinese: 侯月喜; pinyin: Hóu Yuèxǐ) is a rear admiral (shaojiang) of the People's Liberation Army Navy (PLAN) of China. He has been assistant commander of the South Sea Fleet since July 2006. He previously served as chief of staff for the PLA Shanghai Naval Base from 1992 to 1996, as commander of the PLA Shanghai Naval Base from 1996 to 2001 and as chief of staff for the South Sea Fleet from 2002 to 2006.

Military offices
Preceded by Shen Wei (沈伟)	Chief of Staff for the PLA Shanghai Naval Base; 1992–1996	Succeeded by ?
Preceded by Xiao Dewan (肖德万)	Commander of the PLA Shanghai Naval Base; 1996–2001	Succeeded by ?
Preceded by Huang Jiang (黄江)	Chief of Staff for the South Sea Fleet; 2002–2006	Succeeded by Su Zhiqian (苏支前)
Preceded by Deng Minglin (邓明林)	Assistant Commander of the South Sea Fleet; 2006	Incumbent
