= Su Shiliang =

- 苏士亮

Deputy Commander of the People's Liberation Army Navy
- In office December 2010 – January 2014
- Commander: Wu Shengli

Chief of Staff of the People's Liberation Army Navy
- In office January 2009 – December 2010
- Preceded by: Ding Yiping
- Succeeded by: Du Jingchen

Commander of the South Sea Fleet
- In office January 2008 – December 2008
- Preceded by: Gu Wengen
- Succeeded by: Su Zhiqian

Commander of the North Sea Fleet
- In office May 2006 – January 2008
- Preceded by: Zhang Zhannan
- Succeeded by: Tian Zhong

Personal details
- Born: September 1950 (age 75)
- Party: Chinese Communist Party

Military service
- Allegiance: China
- Branch/service: People's Liberation Army Navy
- Years of service: ? − 2014
- Rank: Vice-Admiral

Su Shiliang (Chinese: 苏士亮; born September 1950) is a retired vice-admiral (zhong jiang) of the People's Liberation Army Navy (PLAN) of China. He served as Deputy Commander and Chief of Staff of the PLAN, Commander of the South Sea Fleet and the North Sea Fleet, and President of the PLA Naval Command Academy. He was an alternate of the 17th Central Committee of the Chinese Communist Party.

== Biography ==
Su Shiliang was born in September 1950 in Qingzhou, Shandong Province.

He served as chief of staff of the Qingdao Naval Base from 1995 to 1998, and deputy chief of staff of the North Sea Fleet from 1998 to 2000. In April 2000, he was appointed president of the PLA Naval Command Academy. He then became deputy chief of staff of the Nanjing Military Region in January 2002.

In April 2006, Su was promoted to commander of the North Sea Fleet, and concurrently deputy commander of the Jinan Military Region. In 2007, he was awarded the rank of vice-admiral, and elected as an alternate of the 17th Central Committee of the Chinese Communist Party. In December 2007 Su was transferred to the South Sea Fleet, serving as its commander and concurrently deputy commander of the Guangzhou Military Region.

Su was appointed chief of staff of the PLAN in January 2009, and deputy commander of the Navy in December 2010. He also served as a standing committee member of the 12th CPPCC in 2013. He retired in January 2014.
