= Liu Yi (admiral) =

Chinese admiral

- 刘毅

Deputy Commander of the PLA Navy
- Incumbent
- Assumed office 2011
- Commander: Wu Shengli
- Preceded by: Zhang Zhannan

Personal details
- Born: 1955 (age 70–71) Shandong, China
- Party: Chinese Communist Party

Military service
- Allegiance: China
- Branch/service: People's Liberation Army Navy
- Years of service: ? − present
- Rank: Vice-Admiral

Liu Yi (Chinese: 刘毅; born 1955) is a vice-admiral (zhong jiang) of the People's Liberation Army Navy (PLAN) of China. He has served as a Deputy Commander of the PLAN since 2011.

== Biography ==
Liu Yi was born in Shandong Province in 1955.

Liu is a career submariner. From early 2001 to 2007, he served as commander of the 1st Submarine Base in Laoshan District of Qingdao, Shandong. In mid 2007, Liu became a PLA Navy deputy chief of staff. A few months later, Liu published an article about the Indian Navy in Modern Navy. In 2009, he commanded a goodwill mission to South Korea and Japan, during which non-Chinese cadets took part in full-course navigation training on a Chinese ship for the first time.

In 2010 and 2011, Liu was rapidly promoted through several key positions, serving consecutively as deputy commander of the East Sea Fleet, and deputy commander of the PLA Navy. As of 2013, he was the PLAN's youngest deputy commander.

Liu attained the rank of vice-admiral in July 2012.
