= Ju Xinchun =

Chinese military commander (born 1965)

- 鞠新春

Commander of the Southern Theater Command Navy
- In office February 2023 – November 2023
- Preceded by: Wang Hai
- Succeeded by: TBA

Personal details
- Born: 1965 (age 60–61) Yidu County, Shandong, China
- Party: Chinese Communist Party

Military service
- Allegiance: People's Republic of China
- Branch/service: People's Liberation Army Navy
- Years of service: ?–2023
- Rank: Vice Admiral

Ju Xinchun (Chinese: 鞠新春; pinyin: Jū Xīnchūn; born 1965) is a vice admiral of the Chinese People's Liberation Army Navy (PLAN) who served as commander of the Southern Theater Command Navy in 2023.

== Biography ==
Ju was born in Yidu County (now Qingzhou), Shandong, in 1965. He studied abroad in Europe with a master's degree.

He was captain of Type 052 destroyer, participating in the first Sino-French Naval Maritime Joint Exercise in 2004. He was head of Equipment Department of the South China Sea Fleet (now Southern Theater Command Navy) in 2015 and subsequently deputy commander in April 2016.

In 2021, he was appointed as deputy director of the Equipment Development Department of the Central Military Commission and deputy commander in chief of China's Manned Space Engineering, as well as deputy commander in chief of the Space Station Phase Flight Mission Headquarters.

In February 2003, he rose to commander of the Southern Theater Command Navy and was promoted to the rank of vice admiral (zhongjiang).

=== Downfall ===
On 17 November 2023, his qualification for delegates to the 14th National People's Congress was terminated on suspicion of "serious violations of discipline and law".

Military offices
Preceded by Wang Hai	Commander of the Southern Theater Command Navy; 2023	Succeeded by TBA
