= Wang Shouye =

Chinese vice admiral (born 1943)

- 王守业

Deputy Commander of the People's Liberation Army Navy
- In office 2001–2006
- Commander: Shi Yunsheng; Zhang Dingfa
- Succeeded by: Zhang Zhannan

Personal details
- Born: 1943 (age 82–83) Ye County, Henan, China
- Party: Chinese Communist Party
- Education: Tianjin University

Military service
- Allegiance: China
- Branch/service: People's Liberation Army Navy
- Years of service: 1968–2006
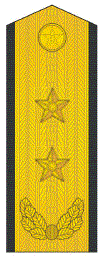
- Rank: Vice Admiral (stripped)

Wang Shouye (Chinese: 王守业; pinyin: Wáng Shǒuyè; born 1943) is a former Chinese vice admiral (zhong jiang) who served as Deputy Commander of the People's Liberation Army Navy (PLAN). He was convicted of embezzling 160 million yuan of public funds and received a death sentence with reprieve in 2006, later commuted to life in prison. At the time of his conviction, it was the biggest corruption scandal in the history of the People's Liberation Army.

== Life and career ==
Wang Shouye was born in 1943 to a peasant family in Li Village, Dengli Township, Ye County, Henan Province. An excellent student, he achieved the sixth highest score in Henan Province in the 1964 Gaokao and was admitted to Tianjin University, where he majored in civil engineering.

In 1968, Wang was recruited into the PLA's 38th Group Army based in Baoding, and served as a military engineer. His high educational background and technical ability distinguished him from other soldiers, and he steadily rose through the ranks. He was later transferred to the PLA General Logistics Department (GLD), where he was repeatedly promoted, and appointed Head of the GLD Division of Infrastructure and Barracks in December 1995. In July 1994 he attained the rank of major general. In July 2001, he was transferred to the People's Liberation Army Navy (PLAN) to serve as a deputy commander. A year later, he was promoted to the rank of vice admiral (zhong jiang). He was ranked second among the five deputy commanders of the PLAN.

== Corruption scandal ==
Wang Shouye was scheduled to retire in June 2006, but in December 2005, he was suspected of corruption and placed under shuanggui by the Commission for Discipline Inspection of the Central Military Commission. In April 2006, he was court-martialled and convicted of embezzling 160 million yuan of public funds. He was sentenced to death with reprieve, which was later commuted to life imprisonment. At the time of his conviction, it was the biggest corruption scandal in the history of the People's Liberation Army.

Wang embezzled most of the funds between 1997 and 2001, when he was in charge of infrastructure and construction of barracks at the GLD. Although his final position as deputy navy commander was higher ranking, it was far less lucrative than the GLD position, which controlled enormous amounts of construction funds. Investigators who searched his homes in Beijing and Nanjing found US$2.5 million stashed in a washing machine and 52 million yuan of cash in refrigerators and microwaves. He also had more than 50 million yuan held in bank accounts.

Wang Shouye reportedly kept at least five mistresses, mostly from the military performance troupe. His most serious and long-term mistress was a military actress surnamed Jiang, who gave birth to a son. Jiang asked Wang to either marry her or break up with her. Wang could not marry her but wanted custody of their son, and Jiang requested a payment of five million yuan. After several years of fruitless bargaining over the payment, Jiang reported Wang's embezzlement to the leaders of the Central Military Commission, resulting in the investigation that led to his conviction.

== Patronage ==
In an article published in the liberal journal Yanhuang Chunqiu, retired Major General Zhang Jinchang suggested that Wang's promotion in the military was owing to the patronage of General Jia Ting'an, who is also a native of Ye County. Zhang stated that General Hong Xuezhi opposed Wang's promotion to deputy Navy commander for his lack of experience in the Navy. Wang may have also gained CCP General Secretary Jiang Zemin's favour for building the grandiose new headquarters of the Central Military Commission.

== See also ==
- Gu Junshan, Chinese lieutenant general convicted of corruption in 2015
