= Shen Jinlong =

Chinese admiral

- 沈金龙
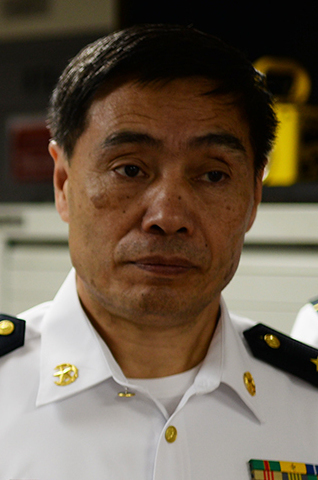
- Shen Jinlong in 2015

8th Commander of the People's Liberation Army Navy
- In office January 2017 – September 2021
- Preceded by: Wu Shengli
- Succeeded by: Dong Jun

Commander of the South Sea Fleet
- In office December 2014 – January 2017
- Preceded by: Jiang Weilie
- Succeeded by: Wang Hai

President of the PLA Naval Command Academy
- In office 2011–2014

President of Dalian Naval Academy
- In office 2010–2011
- Preceded by: Yang Junfei
- Succeeded by: Jiang Guoping

Personal details
- Born: October 1956 (age 69) Nanhui District, Shanghai, China
- Party: Chinese Communist Party

Military service
- Allegiance: People's Republic of China
- Branch/service: People's Liberation Army Navy
- Years of service: ?–2021
- Rank: Admiral

Chinese name
- Traditional Chinese: 沈金龍
- Simplified Chinese: 沈金龙
Transcriptions
Standard Mandarin
- Hanyu Pinyin: Shěn Jīnlóng
Wu
- Wugniu: Sen^{5} Cin^{1}-lon^{6}

Shen Jinlong (Chinese: 沈金龙; born October 1956) is a Chinese admiral who served as Commander of the People's Liberation Army Navy (PLAN) from 2017 to 2021.

== Biography ==
Shen was born in Nanhui, Shanghai in October 1956.

Shen's military career began as an enlisted man, whom after receiving a commission advanced in rank to become the commanding officer of a frigate and later a frigate squadron (dadui). He subsequently served as the chief of staff of a frigate division (zhidui) and as commander of Support Base of the North Sea Fleet and president of Dalian Naval Academy.

He was president of Naval Command Academy from 2011 until 2014. In August 2014, he was appointed deputy commander of the South Sea Fleet, and in December was promoted to commander of the fleet, a deputy military region position (副大军区级). On July 29, 2016, he was awarded the rank of vice admiral (zhong jiang) by the Central Military Commission. He became commander of the PLA Navy in January 2017, replacing the retiring Admiral Wu Shengli. In July 2019, Shen was promoted to the rank of admiral (shang jiang).

Educational offices
Preceded by Yang Junfei (杨骏飞)	President of Dalian Naval Academy; 2010–2011	Succeeded by Jiang Guoping (姜国平)
Military offices
Preceded by Jiang Weilie	Commander of South Sea Fleet; 2014–2017	Succeeded by Wang Hai
Preceded by Wu Shengli	Commander of the People's Liberation Army Navy; 2017–2021	Succeeded by Dong Jun
