= Huang Jiaxiang =

Chinese vice admiral

- 黄嘉祥

Political Commissar of the South Sea Fleet
- In office December 2005 – July 2012
- Preceded by: Xu Yitian
- Succeeded by: Wang Dengping

Political Commissar of the 38th Group Army
- In office July 2001 – December 2005
- Preceded by: Kou Xianxiang
- Succeeded by: Wu Gang

Personal details
- Born: January 1949 (age 77) Nanshi, Shanghai, China
- Party: Chinese Communist Party

Military service
- Allegiance: People's Republic of China
- Branch/service: People's Liberation Army Navy
- Years of service: 1968-2012
- Rank: Vice Admiral

Chinese name
- Traditional Chinese: 黃嘉祥
- Simplified Chinese: 黄嘉祥
Transcriptions
Standard Mandarin
- Hanyu Pinyin: Huáng Jiāxiáng

Huang Jiaxiang (Chinese: 黄嘉祥; born January 1949) is a retired vice admiral (zhongjiang) of the Chinese People's Liberation Army Navy (PLAN). He attained the rank of rear admiral (shaojiang) in 2005, and was promoted to the rank of vice admiral (zhongjiang) in 2007.

== Biography ==
Huang was born in Nanshi District, Shanghai, China in January 1949. He was raised in Qidong, Jiangsu. He enlisted in the People's Liberation Army (PLA) in February 1968, and joined the Chinese Communist Party in March 1969. He served in the 38th Group Army for a long time, where he was promoted to become Political Commissar in July 2001. In 1976, he was appointed political instructor of the Second Company, which was founded by Peng Dehuai in Pingjiang Uprising. He led the army to rescue 16 people in the 1976 Tangshan earthquake. After the Cultural Revolution, Wang Meng became director of State Physical Culture and Sports Commission, Huang was appointed as secretary of its Political Department. In December 2005 he was transferred to Guangzhou Military Region and appointed Deputy Political Commissar and Political Commissar of the South Sea Fleet, serving in the post until he retirement in July 2012.

He was a delegate to the 16th National Congress of the Chinese Communist Party and a delegate to the 11th National People's Congress. He was a member of the 12th National Committee of the Chinese People's Political Consultative Conference.

Military offices
Preceded by Kou Xianxiang	Political Commissar of the 38th Group Army; 2001–2005	Succeeded by Wu Gang (general)
Preceded by Xu Yitian	Political Commissar of South Sea Fleet; 2005–2012	Succeeded by Wang Dengping
