= Wang Zhongcai =

- 王仲才

Commander of the Eastern Theater Command Navy
- Incumbent
- Assumed office June 2022
- Political Commissar: Mei Wen
- Preceded by: Wei Gang

Personal details
- Born: November 1963 (age 62) Li County, Hebei, China
- Party: Chinese Communist Party
- Education: PLA Naval Aviation University; Guangzhou Naval Academy

Military service
- Allegiance: People's Republic of China
- Branch/service: People's Liberation Army Navy
- Years of service: 1980–present
- Rank: Vice Admiral
- Commands: Eastern Theater Command Navy

Wang Zhongcai (Chinese: 王仲才; pinyin: Wáng Zhòngcái; born November 1963) is a vice admiral in the People's Liberation Army of China who is the current deputy commander of the Eastern Theater Command and commander of the Eastern Theater Command Navy.

== Biography ==
Wang was born in Li County, Hebei, in November 1963, and graduated from the Naval Aviation University. In 1987, he was admitted to Guangzhou Naval Academy, where he graduated in 1991.

After university, he was assigned to the North Sea Fleet, where he successively served as trainee deputy captain of Siping missile frigate, deputy captain of Harbin missile destroyer and deputy captain of Qingdao missile destroyer, and vice captain and captain of Hangzhou missile destroyer. After that, he served in the East Sea Fleet for a long time and became commander of the PLA Xiamen Marine Police District in 2013 and deputy chief of staff of the East Sea Fleet in June 2016.

In 2018, he was appointed commander of the China Coast Guard.

In June 2022, he was recalled to the original Eastern Theater Command and commissioned as deputy commander and commander of its Navy.

He attained the rank of rear admiral (shaojiang) in July 2017 and vice admiral (zhongjiang) in June 2022.

Military offices
Preceded by Wei Gang	Commander of the Eastern Theater Command Navy; 2022–present	Incumbent
