= Wei Gang (PLA Navy) =

- 魏钢

Commander of the Eastern Theater Command Navy
- In office January 2017 – June 2022
- Political Commissar: Wang Huayong; Liu Qingsong
- Preceded by: Su Zhiqian
- Succeeded by: Wang Zhongcai

Personal details
- Born: 1960 (age 65–66) Penglai County, Shandong, China
- Party: Chinese Communist Party

Military service
- Allegiance: People's Republic of China
- Branch/service: People's Liberation Army Navy
- Rank: Vice Admiral

Chinese name
- Simplified Chinese: 魏钢
- Traditional Chinese: 魏鋼
Transcriptions
Standard Mandarin
- Hanyu Pinyin: Wèi Gāng

Wei Gang (Chinese: 魏钢; born 1960) is a vice admiral in the People's Liberation Army of China. He was an alternate of the 19th Central Committee of the Chinese Communist Party.

== Biography ==
Wei was born in Penglai County (now Penglai District of Yantai), Shandong, in 1960.

He served in the North Sea Fleet for a long time and once served as commander of the Lüshun Naval Base and chief of staff of the North Sea Fleet from July 2013 to January 2014. In July 2015, he succeeded Xu Weibing as head of the PLA Navy Logistics Department. He was appointed deputy commander of the Southern Theater Command in January 2016, concurrently holding the chief of staff position. He became commander of the Eastern Theater Command Navy in January 2017, and served until June 2022.

He attained the rank of vice admiral (zhongjiang) in July 2017.

Military offices
Preceded by Yuan Yubai	chief of staff of the North Sea Fleet; 2013–2014	Succeeded by Wang Hai
Preceded by Xu Weibing	Head of the PLA Navy Logistics Department; 2015–2016	Succeeded by Li Yujie
New title	Chief of Staff of the Southern Theater Command; 2016–2017	Succeeded by Chen Zhaohai
Preceded by Su Zhiqian	Commander of the Eastern Theater Command Navy; 2017–2022	Succeeded by Wang Zhongcai
