= Su Zhiqian =

Chinese vice admiral

- 苏支前
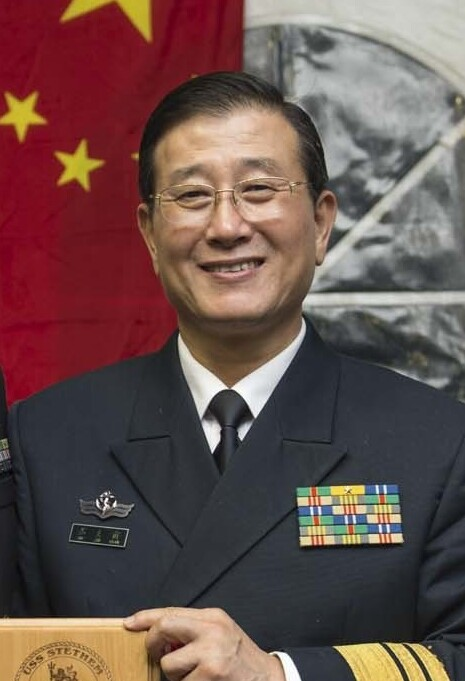
- Su in 2015

Commander of the East Sea Fleet
- In office February 2016 – January 2017
- Preceded by: Du Jingchen
- Succeeded by: Wei Gang

Commander of the South Sea Fleet
- In office January 2009 – December 2010
- Preceded by: Su Shiliang
- Succeeded by: Jiang Weilie

Personal details
- Born: August 1955 (age 71)
- Party: Chinese Communist Party
- Education: Military Academy of the General Staff of the Armed Forces of Russia; PLA Naval Command Academy; PLA National Defence University

Military service
- Allegiance: China
- Branch/service: People's Liberation Army Navy
- Years of service: ? − present
- Rank: Vice-Admiral

Su Zhiqian (Chinese: 苏支前; born August 1955) is a vice-admiral (zhong jiang) of the People's Liberation Army Navy (PLAN) of China. He has served as commander of the East Sea Fleet and concurrently deputy commander of the Nanjing Military Region since 2010, and formerly served as commander of the South Sea Fleet and deputy commander of the Guangzhou Military Region.

== Biography ==
Su Zhiqian was born in August 1955. He studied at the Military Academy of the General Staff of the Armed Forces of Russia, PLA Naval Command Academy, and People's Liberation Army National Defense University (NDU). He was also a faculty member of NDU.

Su spent most of his career in the PLAN's South Sea Fleet, where he served as deputy chief of staff from 2000 to 2006, chief of staff from 2006 to 2007, deputy commander from 2007 to 2009, and in January 2009, he was promoted to commander of the South Sea Fleet and concurrently deputy commander of the Guangzhou Military Region. In December 2010, Su was transferred to the East Sea Fleet, serving as its commander and concurrently deputy commander of the Nanjing Military Region.

Su attained the rank of rear admiral in 2007 and vice-admiral in July 2010.
