= Zhang Zhannan =

Chinese vice admiral

- 张展南

Deputy Commander of the PLA Navy
- In office June 2006 – July 2011
- Commander: Wu Shengli
- Preceded by: Wang Shouye
- Succeeded by: Liu Yi

Commander of the North Sea Fleet
- In office June 2003 – May 2006
- Preceded by: Ding Yiping
- Succeeded by: Su Shiliang

President of Dalian Naval Academy
- In office 1997–2000
- Preceded by: Wu Shengli
- Succeeded by: Zheng Baohua

Personal details
- Born: 1948 (age 77–78) Huarong, Hunan, China
- Party: Chinese Communist Party
- Education: Dalian Naval Academy; PLA Naval Command Academy; PLA National Defence University

Military service
- Allegiance: China
- Branch/service: People's Liberation Army Navy
- Years of service: 1968−2011
- Rank: Vice-Admiral

Zhang Zhannan (Chinese: 张展南; born 1948) is a retired vice-admiral (zhong jiang) of the People's Liberation Army Navy (PLAN) of China. He served as Deputy Commander of the PLAN, Commander of the North Sea Fleet, and President of Dalian Naval Academy.

== Biography ==
Zhang Zhannan was born in 1948 in Huarong County, Hunan Province, and enlisted in the PLAN in 1968. He studied at Dalian Naval Academy, PLA Naval Command Academy, and PLA National Defence University.

Zhang served as chief of staff of the Zhoushan Naval Base from 1994 to 1996, and deputy commander from 1996 to 1997. He was appointed president of Dalian Naval Academy in October 1997, and attained the rank of rear admiral in July 1998.

Zhang became deputy chief of staff of the PLAN in July 2000. In June 2003, he was promoted to commander of the North Sea Fleet, and concurrently deputy commander of the Jinan Military Region. He was awarded the rank of vice-admiral a year later. In May 2006, he was appointed deputy commander of the PLAN. He retired from active service in July 2011.
