= Ding Yiping =

Chinese vice admiral

- 丁一平

Deputy Commander of the People's Liberation Army Navy
- In office August 2006 – July 2014
- Commander: Wu Shengli
- Succeeded by: Du Jingchen

Chief of Staff of the People's Liberation Army Navy
- In office December 2006 – December 2008
- Preceded by: Sun Jianguo
- Succeeded by: Su Shiliang

Commander of the North Sea Fleet
- In office December 2000 – June 2003
- Preceded by: Zhang Dingfa
- Succeeded by: Zhang Zhannan

Personal details
- Born: February 1951 (age 75) Xiangxiang, Hunan, China
- Party: Chinese Communist Party
- Education: PLA Naval Command Academy

Military service
- Allegiance: China
- Branch/service: People's Liberation Army Navy
- Years of service: 1968–2014
- Rank: Vice-Admiral

Ding Yiping (Chinese: 丁一平; born February 1951) is a retired vice-admiral (zhong jiang) of the People's Liberation Army Navy (PLAN) of China. He served as Deputy Commander and Chief of Staff of the PLAN, and Commander of the North Sea Fleet. He was groomed to be the candidate for PLAN Commander, but was demoted following the fatal submarine 361 accident in 2003.

== Early life and career ==
Ding Yiping was born in February 1951 in Xiangxiang, Hunan Province. He graduated from PLA Naval Command Academy. He is the son of Lieutenant General Ding Qiusheng (丁秋生), the founding political commissar of PLAN's North Sea Fleet, and therefore considered a "princeling".

Ding enlisted in the PLA Navy in March 1968, and joined the Chinese Communist Party in February 1970. He spent most of his career in the North Sea Fleet of the Jinan Military Region, successively serving on the naval ships Kunming, Chengdu, and Changsha. He became captain of Changsha in the late 1970s.

In the 1980s, he served as chief of staff of a PLAN minesweeper branch (1983), commander of a frigate branch (1984), deputy commander of a guard command (1987), commander of a destroyer detachment (1989), and chief of staff of a naval base (January 1993). He was appointed President of Guangzhou Naval Academy in July 1993, and promoted to the rank of rear admiral the same month.

== North Sea Fleet command and submarine accident ==
Ding was appointed chief of staff of the North Sea Fleet in January 1995 and deputy commander in December 1997. In December 2000, he was promoted to Commander of the North Sea Fleet and concurrently Deputy Commander of the Jinan Military Region. He was promoted to the rank of vice-admiral in July 2002. He was elected as an alternate of the 16th Central Committee of the Chinese Communist Party in 2002, and re-elected as an alternate of the 17th Central Committee in 2007.

Ding was groomed to be the candidate for Commander of the PLA Navy. He had comparable command experience as Admiral Wu Shengli but was six years younger, and became an alternate Central Committee member five years before Wu. However, Ding was penalized following a fatal accident with the Type 035 Ming-class submarine 361 on April 16, 2003. Its entire crew of 70 men perished, though the submarine was later salvaged. In the accident's aftermath, Ding was demoted by one grade to deputy chief of staff of the Navy, removing him from contention. Wu eventually became the PLAN commander.

== Later career and retirement ==
In August 2006, Ding was promoted to deputy commander of the PLA Navy. Between December 2006 and February 2009 he concurrently served as chief of staff of the PLAN. In July 2014, Ding retired from active military service after reaching the mandatory retirement age. He was replaced by Du Jingchen.

== Publications ==
Ding is one of the more prolific writers in the PLA Navy leadership. In 2000, he published the book World Naval History (世界海军史; Beijing: Haichao Press). He was deputy editor of the 2006 book The Science of Naval Training (Beijing: Academy of Military Science Press, 2006). He has also published a number of articles, including one on the importance of civil-military relations in the journal Culture in Barracks (2007).
