= Gu Wengen =

Chinese naval commander

- 顾文根
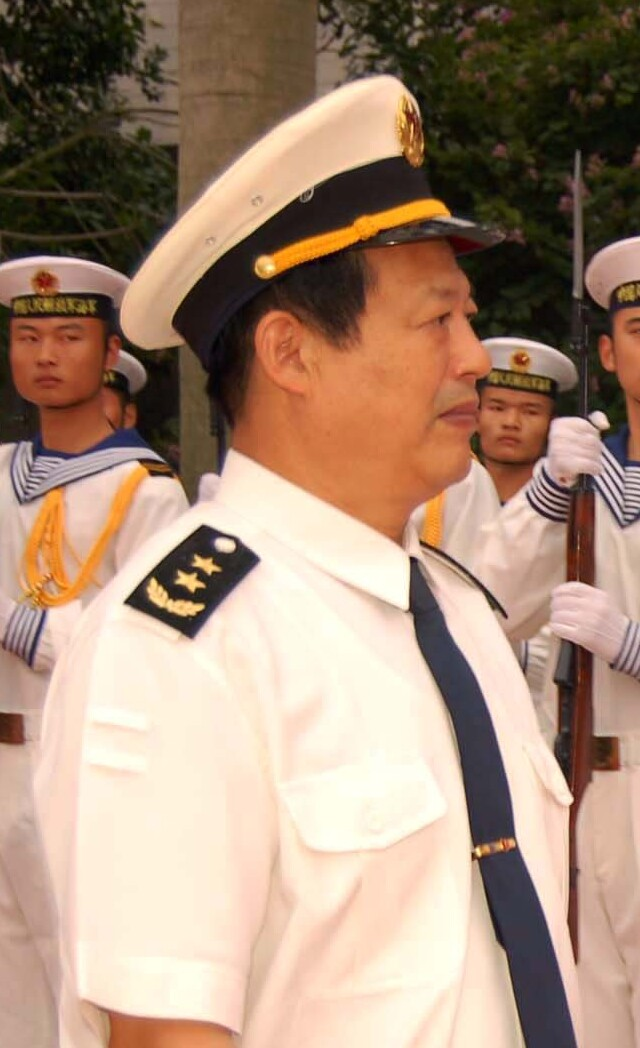
- Gu in 2006

Deputy Commander of the PLA Navy
- In office January 2008 – December 2009
- Commander: Wu Shengli
- Succeeded by: Xu Hongmeng

Commander of the South Sea Fleet
- In office July 2004 – January 2008
- Preceded by: Wu Shengli
- Succeeded by: Su Shiliang

Personal details
- Born: November 1946 (age 79) Nanhui, Shanghai, China
- Party: Chinese Communist Party

Military service
- Allegiance: China
- Branch/service: People's Liberation Army Navy
- Years of service: 1965−2009
- Rank: Vice-Admiral

Gu Wengen (Chinese: 顾文根; born November 1946) is a retired vice-admiral (zhong jiang) of the People's Liberation Army Navy (PLAN) of China. He served as Deputy Commander of the PLAN and Commander of the South Sea Fleet.

== Biography ==
Gu Wengen was born in November 1946 in Nanhui, Shanghai, and enlisted in the PLAN in 1965.

Gu spent most of his career in the PLAN's East Sea Fleet, rising to deputy chief of staff, and then deputy commander in 1996. He also attained the rank of rear admiral the same year. In July 2004, he was promoted to commander of the South Sea Fleet and concurrently deputy commander of the Guangzhou Military Region, succeeding Wu Shengli. He was promoted to vice-admiral in July 2005, and appointed deputy commander of the PLA Navy in January 2008.
