= Wu Shengli =

Chinese admiral

Admiral Wu Shengli
- 吴胜利
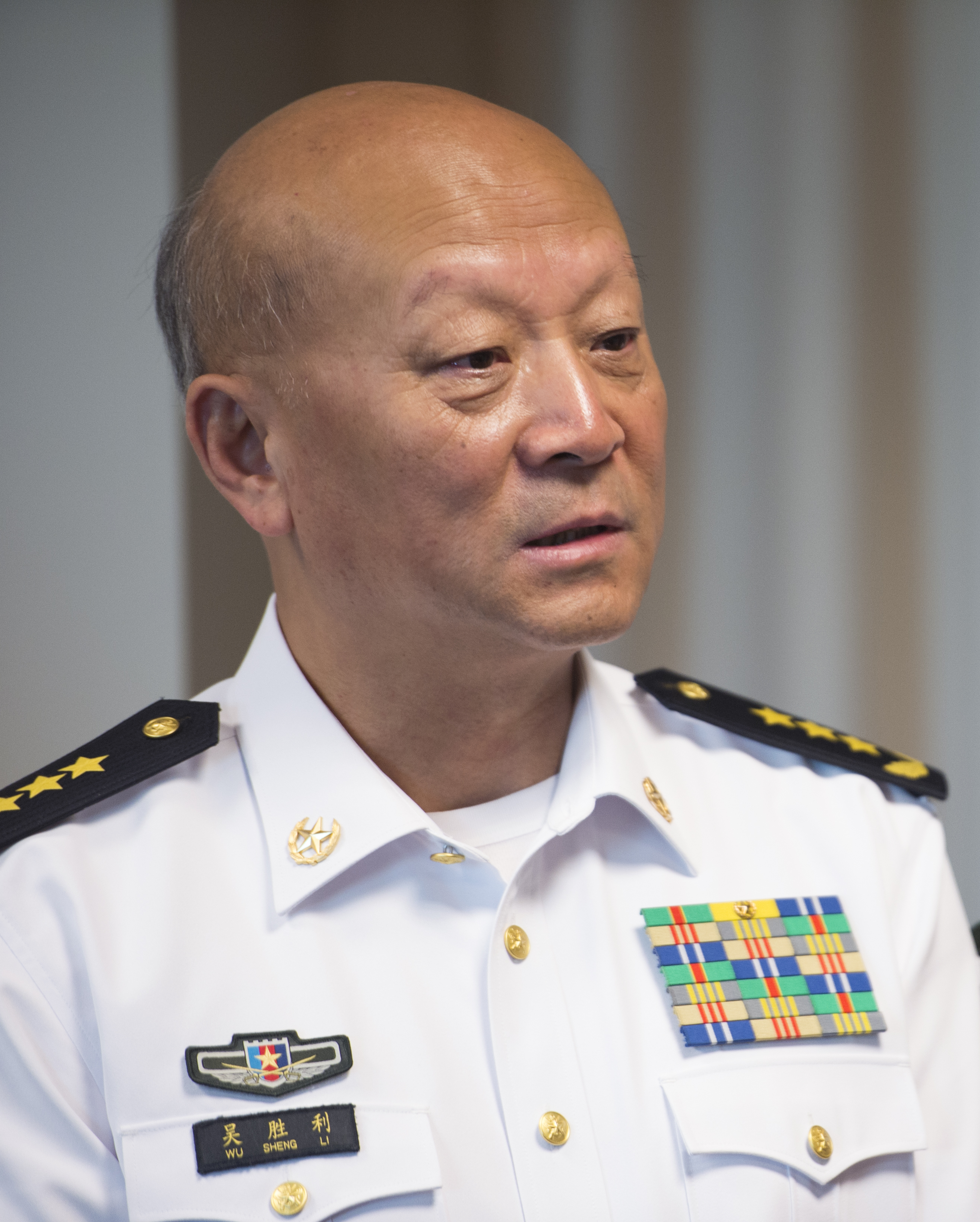
- Wu Shengli in 2009

7th Commander of the People's Liberation Army Navy
- In office August 2006 – January 2017
- Political Commissar: Liu Xiaojiang; Miao Hua
- Preceded by: Zhang Dingfa
- Succeeded by: Shen Jinlong

Commander of the South Sea Fleet
- In office January 2002 – July 2004
- Supreme Command: Jiang Zemin
- Preceded by: Wang Yongguo
- Succeeded by: Gu Wengen

President of Dalian Naval Academy
- In office 1994–1997
- Preceded by: Chen Qingji
- Succeeded by: Zhang Zhannan

Personal details
- Born: August 1945 (age 81) Wuqiao, Hebei, China
- Party: Chinese Communist Party
- Education: PLA Surveying and Mapping Academy; Dalian Naval Academy

Military service
- Allegiance: Chinese Communist Party
- Branch/service: People's Liberation Army Navy
- Years of service: 1964–2018
- Rank: Admiral

Chinese name
- Simplified Chinese: 吴胜利
- Traditional Chinese: 吳勝利
Transcriptions
Standard Mandarin
- Hanyu Pinyin: Wú Shènglì

Wu Shengli (Chinese: 吴胜利; born August 1945) is a retired Chinese admiral who served as commander of the People's Liberation Army Navy (PLAN) from 2006 to 2017. Prior to that, he served as PLA's deputy chief of staff, commander of the South Sea Fleet and commandant principal of Dalian Naval Academy.

Wu presided over the PLAN during a time of expanding Chinese maritime interests and increased regional tensions. The PLAN grew under his tenure from a coastal defense force to an emerging expeditionary force. His tenure was marked by a litany of achievements and historic firsts, including the PLAN's first deployment of a counter-piracy task force to the Gulf of Aden in 2008, the first evacuation of foreign nationals from a distant country during the 2011 Libyan Civil War, and the commissioning of China's first aircraft carrier Liaoning in 2012.

== Early life and education ==
Wu Shengli was born in Wuqiao, Hebei Province in August 1945. He is the son of Wu Xian (吴宪), who was a Red Army political commissar during the Second Sino-Japanese War and the Chinese Civil War. The elder Wu later held important political positions during the Mao years, including mayor of Hangzhou and vice governor of Zhejiang Province. Due to his parentage, Wu Shengli is considered a "princeling" in Chinese political parlance.

Wu enlisted in the PLA Navy in August 1964, and joined the Chinese Communist Party at the same time. He earned a degree in oceanography from the PLA Surveying and Mapping Academy in 1966, just before the Cultural Revolution swept China and largely shut down the country's higher education system. He did not attend naval officer training courses until 1972, when he began the captain's course at the Dalian Naval Academy.

== Early career ==
In the 1970s and 1980s, Wu gained experience as the captain of frigates and destroyers. From 1984 to 1992, he served as the deputy chief of staff of the Shanghai Naval Base, a major support base for the East Sea Fleet, strategically located at the mouth of the Yangtze and close to China's largest city. Jiang Zemin, future General Secretary of the Chinese Communist Party, was serving as Shanghai Party secretary during this time, leading some PLA-watchers to speculate that Wu may have cultivated ties with Jiang.

In 1992, Wu became chief of staff of the Fujian Support Base in the East Sea Fleet. In 1994, at age 49, he was appointed commandant of the Dalian Naval Academy, his alma mater and the PLA Navy's highest educational institution for surface vessel officers. He was also promoted to rear admiral. Wu rejoined the East Sea Fleet as a deputy commander in 1998.

In 2002, he was appointed commander of the South Sea Fleet. He was promoted to vice admiral a year later. In 2004, he moved to Beijing after being promoted to deputy chief of the PLA General Staff Department, a Grade 3 (military-region leader grade) position that made him the second-highest-ranking operational officer in the PLA Navy.

== Command of the PLA Navy ==
Wu Shengli was appointed commander of the PLA Navy in August 2006, when a terminal illness forced his predecessor, Admiral Zhang Dingfa, to step down. Zhang died in December 2006. Vice Admiral Ding Yiping, who was six years younger than Wu but became an alternate Central Committee of the Chinese Communist Party member five years earlier, had been groomed to be the candidate for Navy Commander. However, Ding was penalized following the Ming-class submarine 361 accident in April 2003, which killed its entire crew of 70 people. In the aftermath, Ding was demoted by one grade, removing him from contention. Wu was promoted to the rank of admiral in June 2007.

Wu presided over the PLA Navy during a time of expanding Chinese maritime interests, increasing regional tensions, and diversifying missions for the navy. The service has grown from a narrowly focused coastal defense force to an emerging expeditionary force. His tenure has been marked by a litany of achievements and historic firsts. These include the PLA Navy's first deployment of a counter-piracy task force to the Gulf of Aden in 2008, the successful preparation and execution of the 60th Anniversary Fleet Review in 2009, the first evacuation of foreign nationals from a distant country during the 2011 Libyan Civil War, and the commissioning of Liaoning, China's first aircraft carrier, in 2012.

== Central Military Commission and Central Committee ==
Wu became a member of the 17th Central Committee of the Chinese Communist Party in 2007 and of the Central Military Commission (CMC) in March 2008. In the run up to the 18th National Congress of the Chinese Communist Party in November 2012, some PLA-watchers expected that Wu would be named vice chairman of the CMC or defense minister. However, after the Party Congress, he remained PLA Navy commander. He was reelected a member of the 18th CCP Central Committee (2012–2017).
