= Zhang Zheng (admiral) =

People's Liberation Army Navy officer

- 张峥

Chief of Staff of the People's Liberation Army Navy
- Incumbent
- Assumed office December 2025
- Preceded by: Li Hanjun

Captain of the Liaoning Carrier
- In office September 2012 – May 2016
- Preceded by: Newly established
- Succeeded by: Liu Zhe

Commander of the Shandong Carrier Formation
- In office 2017–2021
- Preceded by: Newly established
- Succeeded by: Dai Mingmeng

Personal details
- Born: September 1969 (age 57) Changxing, Zhejiang, China
- Party: Chinese Communist Party
- Education: Shanghai Jiao Tong University Joint Services Command and Staff College

Military service
- Allegiance: People's Republic of China
- Branch/service: People's Liberation Army Navy
- Years of service: 1990-present
- Rank: Vice Admiral
- Unit: East Sea Fleet Chinese aircraft carrier Liaoning Unit 91181 Chinese aircraft carrier Shandong Unit 91910 Unit 91991

Zhang Zheng (Chinese: 张峥; born September 1969) is a People's Liberation Army Navy officer who served as captain of Chinese aircraft carrier Liaoning from September 2012 to May 2016. He currently serves as the Chief of Staff of the Navy.

Zhang is a member of the Chinese Communist Party.

== Biography ==
Zhang was born into a military family in Changxing County, Zhejiang, in September 1969. His father is a former naval officer in the East Sea Fleet. He attended the First High School of Dinghai. In 1986, he was accepted to Shanghai Jiao Tong University, majoring in automatic-control. After college, he was assigned to the Command of East Sea Fleet as an assistant engineer. In 1992, he entered Dalian Naval Academy, majoring in warship combat command, he earned a master's degree in 1995. After graduation, he worked in 91991 Army, and served various roles in there, including Staff officer, XO, and CO. He then studied at Joint Services Command and Staff College in the United Kingdom for two years. He returned to China in 2003 and was awarded the rank of commodore. In September 2012 he was appointed the Captain of Chinese aircraft carrier Liaoning, and held that position until May 2016, when he was promoted to Assistant Deputy Chief of Staff of the People's Liberation Army Navy (PLA Navy). In December 2025, he was promoted to Vice Admiral and Chief of Staff of the People's Liberation Army Navy. He is assumed to have acting as the Commander since the disappearance of his predeccessor Hu Zhongming.

Military offices
New title	Captain of Chinese aircraft carrier Liaoning; 2012–2016	Succeeded by Liu Zhe
