= Chief of Staff of the People's Liberation Army Navy =

#3 officer in the PLAN

- 中国人民解放军海军参谋长
- Naval Ensign of the People's Republic of China
- Incumbent; Zhang Zheng since December 2025
- Member of: Central Military Commission
- Reports to: The Chairman
- Seat: Beijing
- Nominator: The CMC Chairman
- Appointer: The CMC Chairman
- Formation: 1950
- First holder: Luo Shunchu

The Chief of Staff of the People's Liberation Army Navy (simplified Chinese: 中国人民解放军海军参谋长; traditional Chinese: 中國人民解放軍海軍參謀長; pinyin: Zhōngguó Rénmín Jiěfàngjūn Hǎijūn Cānmóuzhǎng) is the third highest-ranking officer in the People's Liberation Army Navy (PLAN). The Chief of Staff is the head of the Naval Forces Military Command authorities and responsible to assist the military officer in the navy command.

== List of chiefs of staff ==
No.	Portrait	Inspector of the Navy	Took office	Left office	Time in office	Alma mater	Ref.
1	Luo Shunchu [zh]罗舜初	Vice Admiral; Luo Shunchu 罗舜初 (1914–1981)	June 1950	March 1952	1 year, 9 months	PLA Nanjing Political College	.
2	Zhou Xihan周希汉	Vice Admiral; Zhou Xihan 周希汉 (1913–1988)	March 1952	March 1961	9 years	PLA National Defence University	.
3	Zhang Xuesi [zh]张学思	Rear Admiral; Zhang Xuesi 张学思 (1916–1970)	March 1961	May 1968	7 years, 2 months	Voroshilov Naval Academy	.
4	Ma Guansan马冠三	Rear Admiral; Ma Guansan 马冠三	February 1968	November 1968	9 months	.	.
5	Pan Yan (admiral) [zh]潘焱	Rear Admiral; Pan Yan (admiral) 潘焱 (1916–1999)	November 1968	August 1975	6 years, 9 months	Counter-Japanese Military and Political University	.
6	Yang Guoyu [zh]杨国宇	Rear Admiral; Yang Guoyu 杨国宇 (1914–2000)	August 1975	August 1982	7 years	PLA National Defence University	.
7	Ma Xinchun马辛春	Vice Admiral; Ma Xinchun 马辛春 (born 1925)	August 1982	July 1985	2 years, 11 months	Naval War College	.
8	An Liqun安立群	Rear Admiral; An Liqun 安立群	July 1985	September 1987	2 years, 2 months	Dalian Naval Academy	.
9	Zhang Xusan [zh]张序三	Vice Admiral; Zhang Xusan 张序三 (born 1929)	September 1987	April 1990	4 years, 9 months	PLA National Defence University	.
10	Zhao Guochen [zh]赵国臣	Vice Admiral; Zhao Guochen 赵国臣 (1935–1994)	June 1990	September 1994	4 years, 5 months	PLA Navy Command Academy	.
11	He Linzhong [zh]何林忠	Vice Admiral; He Linzhong 何林忠 (born 1937)	September 1994	November 1997	3 years, 2 months	PLA Navy Command Academy	.
12	Yao Xingyuan [zh]么兴远	Vice Admiral; Yao Xingyuan 么兴远 (born 1941)	November 1997	June 2000	2 years, 7 months	Naval War College	.
13	Wang Yucheng (admiral) [zh]王玉成	Vice Admiral; Wang Yucheng (admiral) 王玉成 (born 1941)	June 2000	January 2003	2 years, 7 months	.	.
14	Zhao Xingfa [zh]赵兴发	Vice Admiral; Zhao Xingfa 赵兴发 (born 1945)	January 2003	December 2004	1 year, 11 months	PLA National Defence University	.
15	Sun Jianguo孙建国	Vice Admiral; Sun Jianguo 孙建国 (born 1952)	December 2004	December 2006	2 years	Dalian Naval Academy	.
16	Ding Yiping丁一平	Vice Admiral; Ding Yiping 丁一平 (born 1951)	December 2006	December 2008	2 years	Central Party School of the Chinese Communist Party	.
17	Su Shiliang苏士亮	Vice Admiral; Su Shiliang 苏士亮 (born 1950)	December 2008	December 2010	2 years	.	.
18	Du Jingchen杜景臣	Vice Admiral; Du Jingchen 杜景臣 (born 1952)	December 2010	July 2014	3 years, 7 months	.	
19	Qiu Yanpeng邱延鹏	Vice Admiral; Qiu Yanpeng 邱延鹏 (born 1956)	July 2014	January 2018	3 years, 6 months	Dalian Naval Academy	
20	Zhang Wendan张文旦	Rear Admiral; Zhang Wendan 张文旦 (born 1958)	January 2018	December 2019	1 year, 11 months	.	
21	Li Yujie李玉杰	Vice Admiral; Li Yujie 李玉杰 (born 1962)	December 2019	December 2021	2 years	.	
22	Hu Zhongming胡中明	Vice Admiral; Hu Zhongming 胡中明 (born 1964)	December 2021	December 2023	2 years	.	
23	Li Hanjun李汉军	Vice Admiral; Li Hanjun 李汉军 (born 1965)	December 2023	June 2025	1 year, 6 months	.	
24	Zhang Zheng	Vice Admiral; Zhang Zheng (born 1969)	December 2025	Present	8 months	Joint Services Command and Staff College	
