= Fang Yonggang =

Fang Yonggang (April 1963 – March 25, 2008) was born in Jianping County, Chaoyang, Liaoning, China. He served as a professor at the Dalian Naval Academy of the People's Liberation Army Navy. In 2007, he was awarded the honorary title of "Model Instructor Loyal to the Party’s Innovative Theory" by the Central Military Commission of China.

== Biography ==
In 1985, Fang Yonggang graduated from Fudan University, majoring in history, and was assigned to serve as an instructor in the History of the Chinese Communist Party at the Dalian Naval Academy (then known as the PLA Navy Political College). He joined the Chinese Communist Party in 1992. In 1995, Fang expressed a desire to leave military service and transfer to a civilian post, but his request was denied by the academy’s leadership. In 1999, Fang Yonggang transferred to the Dalian Naval Academy along with the Navy Political College as part of an institutional merger. He later served as a professor and master's advisor in the Teaching and Research Office of Theories of Socialism with Chinese Characteristics within the Department of Political Science. In 2005, he received a doctoral degree in military science.

Since 1987, Fang Yonggang had been engaged in theoretical research. He closely followed the Chinese Communist Party’s latest theoretical developments, including Deng Xiaoping Theory, the Three Represents, and the Scientific Outlook on Development, and consistently produced research outcomes in response. In the summer of 2006, while contributing to the compilation of the textbook Special Topics in the Party’s Innovative Theories, Fang wrote:“The Scientific Outlook on Development represents a new level in the Party’s theoretical innovation.”

On November 8, 2006, Fang Yonggang was diagnosed with colorectal cancer and was admitted to the 中国人民解放军联勤保障部队第九六七医院 in Dalian for treatment. On January 24, 2007, Hu Jintao, then General Secretary of the Chinese Communist Party, read about Fang’s story in a neican (internal reference report) and issued a directive:“Every effort must be made to save Comrade Fang Yonggang’s life. His exemplary deeds should be carefully summarized and widely promoted.”Following Hu Jintao’s directive, senior officials including Li Changchun and Guo Boxiong also immediately expressed their support for Fang’s treatment and for publicizing his story. On February 1, the People’s Liberation Army Navy dispatched a special aircraft to transfer Fang to the 301 Hospital (PLA General Hospital) in Beijing for further treatment.

On February 20, 2007, Hu Jintao personally visited Fang Yonggang in the hospital and praised him for “achieving outstanding results in promoting the Party’s innovative theories.” He called on all Communist Party members and military personnel to learn from Comrade Fang Yonggang.In response, the Publicity Department of the Chinese Communist Party, the Ministry of Education (China), and the General Political Department of the People's Liberation Army jointly issued a notice in April 2007, launching a nationwide campaign titled “Learn from Comrade Fang Yonggang”, establishing him as a model for ideological and theoretical education.

On March 25, 2008, Fang Yonggang died at the 301 Hospitalat the age of 45.

== Honor ==
Model Instructor Loyal to the Party’s Innovative Theory, Central Military Commission Honor (June 2007)

第一届全国道德模范之全国敬业奉献模范（2007年9月）

Delegate to the 17th National Congress of the Chinese Communist Party (October 2007)

Touching China Annual Person of the Year Award by China Central Television (February 2008)
