= Li Yujie =

Li Yujie may refer to:

- Li Yujie (taekwondo) (born 2001), Chinese parataekwondo practitioner
- Li Yujie (admiral) (born 1962), vice admiral of the People's Liberation Army (PLA)
