= Zhang Lianzhong =

Chinese admiral

- 张连忠

4th Commander of the People's Liberation Army Navy
- In office January 1988 – November 1996
- Political Commissars: Li Yaowen, Wei Jinshan, Zhou Kunren
- Preceded by: Liu Huaqing
- Succeeded by: Shi Yunsheng

Personal details
- Born: 23 June 1931 (age 95) Jiaozhou, Shandong, China
- Party: Chinese Communist Party
- Education: PLAN Submarine Academy; PLA National Defence University

Military service
- Allegiance: China
- Branch/service: People's Liberation Army Navy
- Years of service: 1947–1996
- Rank: Admiral
- Battles/wars: Chinese Civil War

Zhang Lianzhong
- Traditional Chinese: 張連忠
- Simplified Chinese: 张连忠
Transcriptions
Standard Mandarin
- Hanyu Pinyin: Zhāng Liánzhōng
- Wade–Giles: Chang^{1} Lien^{2}-chung^{1}
- IPA: [ʈʂáŋ ljɛ̌n.ʈʂʊ́ŋ]

Zhang Lianzhong (Chinese: 张连忠; born 23 June 1931) is a retired submariner and admiral of the Chinese People's Liberation Army Navy (PLAN). An army veteran of the Chinese Civil War, he trained to become a submariner in the 1960s and commanded China's first submarine mission to sail past the first island chain into the Pacific Ocean in 1976. He served as commander of the Lüshun Naval Base from 1983 to 1985 and as commander of the PLA Navy from 1988 to 1996.

== Early life and army career ==
Zhang was born on 23 June 1931 in Xiaogao Village, Jiaozhou, Shandong, Republic of China. He enlisted in the People's Liberation Army in March 1947 and fought in major battles of the Chinese Civil War, including the Battle of Jiaodong, the Battle of Jinan, the Huaihai campaign, the Yangtze River Crossing Campaign, the Shanghai Campaign, and the Battle of Zhangzhou–Xiamen.

After the founding of the People's Republic of China in 1949, Zhang served in the 31st Group Army as a platoon and company commander. Following two years of study at the Advanced Infantry School from 1956 to 1958, he served as a battalion chief of staff in the Fuzhou Military Region.

== Career in the Navy ==
In August 1960, Zhang entered the PLA Navy Submarine Academy in Qingdao. Upon graduation in 1965, he served as a submarine captain and later commander of a submarine detachment. In 1976, China for the first time sent a submarine (No. 252) to sail past the first island chain into the Pacific Ocean, for a total journey of 3,300 nautical miles. Zhang served as the commander of the mission.

From 1979 to 1980, Zhang studied at the PLA Military Academy (now PLA National Defence University), and subsequently served as deputy chief of staff of the North Sea Fleet and commander of the Lüshun Naval Base. In September 1983, Zhang received North Korean President Kim Il Sung on the latter's visit of the Lüshun Base, who was accompanied by General Secretary Hu Yaobang.

=== Commander of the Navy ===
In early 1985, Zhang was promoted to deputy commander of the PLA Navy, in charge of logistics and equipment. He was elected an alternate member of the 13th Central Committee of the Chinese Communist Party in November 1987. Although the most junior among the navy's deputy commanders, Zhang was chosen by Deng Xiaoping and Liu Huaqing to succeed Liu as the 4th Commander of the PLA Navy in January 1988. He was the first commander of the navy to have served at sea, whereas his predecessors were all veteran revolutionaries of the Long March era. He attained the rank of vice admiral in September 1988 and admiral in May 1993. He was elected a full member of the 14th Central Committee of the Chinese Communist Party in 1992.

Zhang put a strong emphasis on maritime defence. In an interview in 1988, he said that "We will never forget that China was invaded several times by imperialist troops from the sea. The nation's suffering from lack of sea defence still remains fresh in our mind; and the history should not repeat itself." He served for more than eight years as the PLAN commander until November 1996, when he was succeeded by naval aviator Shi Yunsheng. According to James R. Lilley and David Shambaugh, Zhang was "respected" in the navy.
