= Qiu Yanpeng =

Vice-admiral of the People's Liberation Army Navy of China

- 邱延鹏
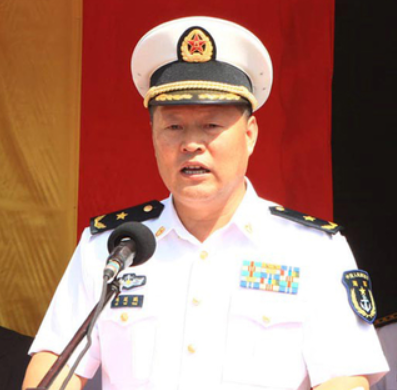

Chief of Staff of the People's Liberation Army Navy
- In office July 2014 – January 2018
- Commander: Wu Shengli
- Preceded by: Du Jingchen
- Succeeded by: Zhang Wendan

Commander of the North Sea Fleet
- In office December 2013 – July 2014
- Preceded by: Tian Zhong
- Succeeded by: Yuan Yubai

Personal details
- Born: 1956 (age 69–70) Wudi, Shandong, China
- Party: Chinese Communist Party
- Education: Dalian Naval Academy

Military service
- Allegiance: China
- Branch/service: People's Liberation Army Navy
- Years of service: ? − present
- Rank: Vice-Admiral

Qiu Yanpeng (Chinese: 邱延鹏; born 1956) is a vice-admiral (zhong jiang) of the People's Liberation Army Navy (PLAN) of China. He served as Chief of Staff of the PLA Navy from 2014 to 2018, and Commander of the North Sea Fleet from 2013 to 2014.

== Biography ==
Qiu Yanpeng was born in 1956 in Wudi County, Shandong Province. He graduated from Dalian Naval Academy.

Qiu was appointed deputy chief of staff of the East Sea Fleet in 2009, and attained the rank of rear admiral a year later. In December 2013, he succeeded Tian Zhong as commander of the North Sea Fleet as well as Deputy Commander of the Jinan Military Region. Less than a year later, Qiu was appointed Chief of Staff of the PLA Navy, succeeding Du Jingchen. Yuan Yubai replaced him as commander of the North Sea Fleet. In July 2015, Qiu was promoted to the rank of vice-admiral, together with Yuan Yubai.

Although Qiu began his career when the Chinese navy was still a small coastal force, he has accumulated extensive experience commanding blue-water operations and engaging with foreign militaries. In 2007, he commanded the Aman-07 naval exercise. It was the first time the Chinese navy joined an international naval exercise, and the first time for a Chinese officer to command foreign naval forces. In the same year, he also led a destroyer formation to Indonesia, on the Chinese navy's first visit to the country in more than a decade.

Qiu also led the PLAN's fourth Gulf of Aden anti-piracy task force in 2009 and 2010, sailing into the Persian Gulf for the first time in the history of the Chinese Navy. The ships paid a port visit to Abu Dhabi, and visited Manila, the Philippines on their way home. In 2011, Qiu commanded the Chinese Peace Ark hospital ship in the 105-day-long "Harmonious-Mission 2011". The ship sailed for more than 24,600 nautical miles, and provided medical care in several Caribbean countries including Cuba, Jamaica, Costa Rica, and Trinidad and Tobago.
