= Liu Huaqing =

Chinese admiral (1916–2011)

General Liu Huaqing
- 刘华清

Vice Chairman of the Central Military Commission
- In office State Commission: 28 March 1993 – 5 March 1998; Party Commission: November 1989 – 18 September 1997 Serving with Yang Shangkun, Zhang Zhen, Chi Haotian and Zhang Wannian
- Chairman: Jiang Zemin

Commander of the People's Liberation Army Navy
- In office August 1982 – January 1988
- Preceded by: Ye Fei
- Succeeded by: Zhang Lianzhong

Personal details
- Born: 1 October 1916 Huang'an County, Hubei, China
- Died: 14 January 2011 (aged 94) Beijing, China
- Party: Chinese Communist Party
- Children: Liu Zhuoming; Liu Chaoying
- Education: Kuznetsov Naval Academy

Military service
- Allegiance: People's Republic of China
- Branch/service: Chinese Workers' and Peasants' Red Army (Republic of China (1912–1949)) Eighth Route Army; People's Liberation Army Ground Force; People's Liberation Army Navy
- Years of service: 1930–1998
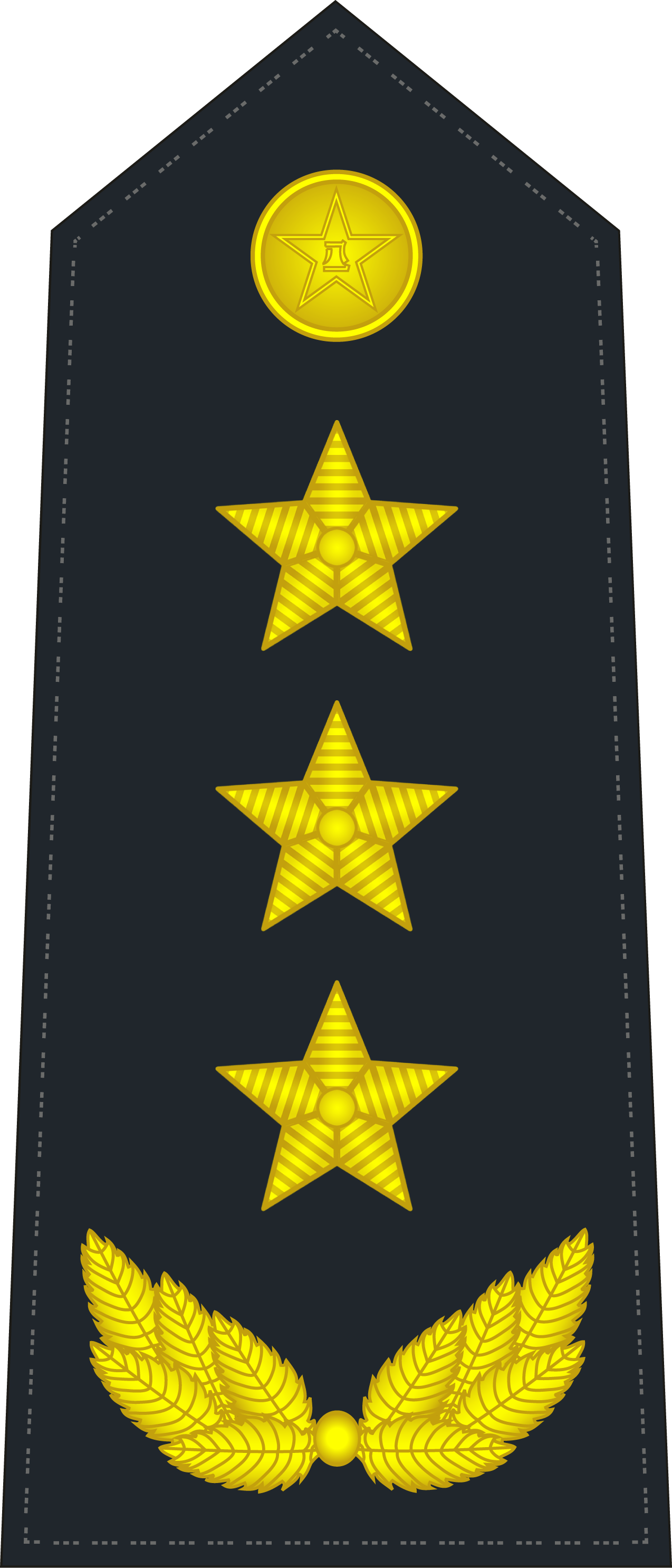
- Rank: Admiral General

- Awards: August 1 Medal (2nd Class) Order of Independence and Freedom (2nd Class) Order of Liberation (1st Class)

Chinese name
- Simplified Chinese: 刘华清
- Traditional Chinese: 劉華清
Transcriptions
Standard Mandarin
- Hanyu Pinyin: Liú Huáqīng

Liu Huaqing (Chinese: 刘华清; 1 October 1916 – 14 January 2011) was a Chinese revolutionary and an admiral of the People's Liberation Army Navy, who served as the third Commander-in-Chief of the Navy from 1982 through 1988. He is considered to have greatly contributed to the modernization of the Chinese Navy, and is hailed as the "father of the modern Chinese Navy" and "father of Chinese aircraft carriers".

== Biography ==
=== Early Revolutionary Period and Chinese Civil War ===
Liu joined the Communist Youth League of China in October 1929, before joining the Chinese Red Army in December 1930 and becoming an official member of the Chinese Communist Party in October 1935. He participated in the Long March as Head of the Organisation, Propaganda, Culture and Printing Section of the Political Department of the 25th Army during the period from 1934-1936.

During the Second Sino-Japanese War, Liu advanced through the ranks, culminating in becoming the Deputy Political Commissar of the Political Department of the Jili-Yu Military Region.

At the start of the Chinese Civil War's second phase after the defeat of Japan, Liu was the political commissar of the 6th Brigade, 2nd Division in the Jin-Hebei-Lu-Yu Military District. By 1949, he had become the political commissar of the 11th Army, 3rd Corps of the Second Field Army.

=== People's Republic of China ===
Following the victory over the Kuomintang, Liu was the deputy political commissar of the 10th Army, before being appointed as the vice-principal and deputy political commissar of the Dalian Naval Academy in 1952. In 1954, Liu was sent to the Voroshilov Naval Academy in the Soviet Union along with a group of senior cadres to study. Upon returning from the Soviet Union, Liu was awarded the rank of Admiral in 1955. In 1958, he was Deputy Commander and Chief of Staff of the Lushun Naval Base as well as being Deputy Commander of the North Sea Fleet, before being promoted to Commander of the Lushun Naval Base.

In 1965, Liu left the military to become the Vice Minister of the Sixth Ministry of Machine Building. In 1966, he was made Deputy Director of the Commission for Defence Technology.

During the Cultural Revolution, Liu's career was relatively unimpaired. He was transferred officially to the Navy in 1969 along with being appointed to the Naval Shipbuilding Industry Group as its director. In 1970, Liu was made Deputy Chief of Staff of the People's Liberation Army Navy (PLAN), and took up a high position in the Chinese Academy of Sciences in 1975.

Following the end of the Cultural Revolution and the beginning of the Reform and Opening Up period, Liu travelled to the United States to visit American aircraft carriers. He was then appointed Commander of the PLAN in 1982.

==== Leading the PLAN ====
Taking over the role of Navy Commander-in-Chief from his predecessor Ye Fei (who retired due to health problems in 1982), Liu had outlined a three-step process by which China would have a navy of global reach by the second half of the 21st century. In step one, from 2000 to 2010, China would develop a naval force that could operate up to the first island chain. In step two, from 2010 to 2020, China's navy would become a regional force capable of projecting force to the second island chain. In step three, to be achieved by 2040, China would possess a blue-water navy centered around aircraft carriers. He was a strong advocate of the Chinese aircraft carrier programme.

During that time, Liu was a member of the Central Military Commission (CMC), and was the top commander of the troops enforcing martial law to suppress the Tiananmen Square protests on 3–4 June 1989.

==== Central Military Commission and Retirement ====
In 1990, Liu became the Vice Chairman of the CMC.

In 1992, Liu became the 6th-ranked member of the Politburo Standing Committee, the Communist Party's top leadership body. He was the last active military member to sit on the Standing Committee, and since his departure from the Standing Committee in 1997, no other military leader has sat on the Committee. Liu officially retired from the military after stepping down as Vice Chairman of the CMC in March 1998.

Liu remained active through the mid-1990s and appeared in uniform at 2007 commemorations of the 80th anniversary of the founding of the People's Liberation Army in Beijing. He also appeared in Beijing during the 60th anniversary of the People's Republic of China on 1 October 2009.

Liu died on 14 January 2011 in Beijing. His son Liu Zhuoming is a vice admiral of the PLA Navy. His daughter Liu Chaoying, a former lieutenant colonel in the PLA, was a major figure in the 1996 United States campaign finance controversy.

Military offices
Preceded by Ye Fei	Commander of the People's Liberation Army Navy; 1982–1988	Succeeded by Zhang Lianzhong
Order of precedence
Preceded by Zhu Rongji (5th)	Politburo Standing Committee of the Chinese Communist Party (6th); 1992–1997	Succeeded by Hu Jintao (7th)
