= Wei Jinshan =

Chinese politician (1927–2023)

- 魏金山

Political Commissar of the People's Liberation Army Navy
- In office April 1990 – December 1993
- Commander: Zhang Lianzhong
- Preceded by: Li Yaowen
- Succeeded by: Zhou Kunren

Personal details
- Born: 5 April 1927 Penglai, Shandong, China
- Died: 8 December 2023 (aged 96) Nanjing, Jiangsu, China
- Party: Chinese Communist Party
- Awards: Order of Liberation; Order of the National Flag; Order of Friendship; Order of Independence; Medal of Honour

Military service
- Allegiance: People's Republic of China
- Branch/service: People's Liberation Army Ground Force; People's Liberation Army Navy
- Years of service: 1945–1993
- Rank: Vice Admiral
- Battles/wars: Second Sino-Japanese War; Chinese Civil War; Korean War

Wei Jinshan (Chinese: 魏金山; Wade–Giles: Wei^{4} Chin^{1}-shan^{1}; 5 April 1927 – 8 December 2023) was a Chinese Communist revolutionary and vice admiral of the Chinese People's Liberation Army Navy (PLAN). Starting in 1945, he served for decades in the army under General Xu Shiyou, and became a decorated veteran of the Second Sino-Japanese War, the Chinese Civil War, and the Korean War. He later transferred to the Navy and served as Political Commissar of the PLAN from 1990 to 1993. He was awarded the Medal of Honour by CCP general secretary Xi Jinping and the Order of the National Flag by North Korea.

== Republic of China ==
Wei Jinshan was born on 5 April 1927 in Wei Family Village (魏家村) in Penglai, Shandong, Republic of China. During the Second Sino-Japanese War, he attended secondary school in the Jiaodong Communist Base from 1943 to 1944. In February 1945, he enlisted in the Eighth Route Army and served under General Xu Shiyou, the commander of the Jiaodong Military Area.

After the Empire of Japan announced its surrender on 15 August 1945, the Communist forces in Shandong attacked Jimo, which was held by Japan and the puppet Wang Jingwei regime, to gain an advantage over the Kuomintang forces. Wei participated in the battle on 26 August, when the Communists took over the city after a three-hour battle and annihilated the 34th Brigade of the Wang Jingwei regime.

Soon after the Battle of Jimo, Wei was promoted to a company-level officer. Under the command of Xu Shiyou, he distinguished himself in major battles during the Chinese Civil War, including the Battle of Laiwu, the Menglianggu campaign, the Battle of Jinan, the Huaihai campaign, and the Yangtze River Crossing Campaign. At Menglianggu, the 9th Column Wei belonged to was a main attacking force. It subsequently became the main unit of the East China Field Army (later renamed the Third Field Army). By the end of the civil war in 1949, Wei had been promoted to Chief of Staff of the Combat Department of the 79th Division, under the 27th Army of the Third Field Army.

== People's Republic of China ==
A year after the founding of the People's Republic of China in 1949, Wei joined the People's Volunteer Army to fight in the Korean War in November 1950. He continued to serve in the 79th Division of the 27th Army, and participated in the Second Phase Offensive and the Fifth Phase Offensive.

After the Korean War, Wei served in the East China Military Region, which was reorganized into the Nanjing Military Region in 1955. Wei headed the training department of the Nanjing MR, before being appointed the secretary of Xu Shiyou, the commander of the military region. Having earned the trust of Xu, Wei was successively promoted to regiment commander, Political Commissar of the 179th Division, Political Commissar of the 60th Army, Political Commissar of the 12th Army (1978), Director of the Political Department of the Nanjing MR (1982), and Director of the Political Department of the PLA General Staff Department (1985).

=== PLA Navy ===
After decades of service in the army, Wei transferred to the PLA Navy in July 1985 to serve as the sole Deputy Political Commissar under Li Yaowen. He was awarded the rank of vice admiral in September 1988. In April 1990, he succeeded Li as Political Commissar of the Navy, serving alongside Commander Zhang Lianzhong. He retired in December 1993.

Wei became an alternate member of the 12th Central Committee of the Chinese Communist Party in 1982, and was elected a full member of the 13th and 14th Central Committees, serving from 1987 to 1997. He was also a delegate to the 5th National People's Congress.

== Death ==
Wei Jinshan died in Nanjing on 8 December 2023, at the age of 96.

== Honours ==
Wei was a recipient of the Order of Liberation (Third Class). For his service in the Korean War, he was awarded the Order of the National Flag (Third Class) by the North Korean government. Before his retirement, he was awarded the Order of Friendship (Second Class) by North Korea in October 1992. In July 1998, he was awarded the Order of Independence (独立功勋荣誉章) by the Central Military Commission.

In September 2015, the 70th anniversary of the surrender of Japan, CCP general secretary Xi Jinping awarded the Medal of Honour to 30 people who made major contributions to the victory over Japan. Wei was one of the recipients.
