= Zhang Wendan =

- 张文旦
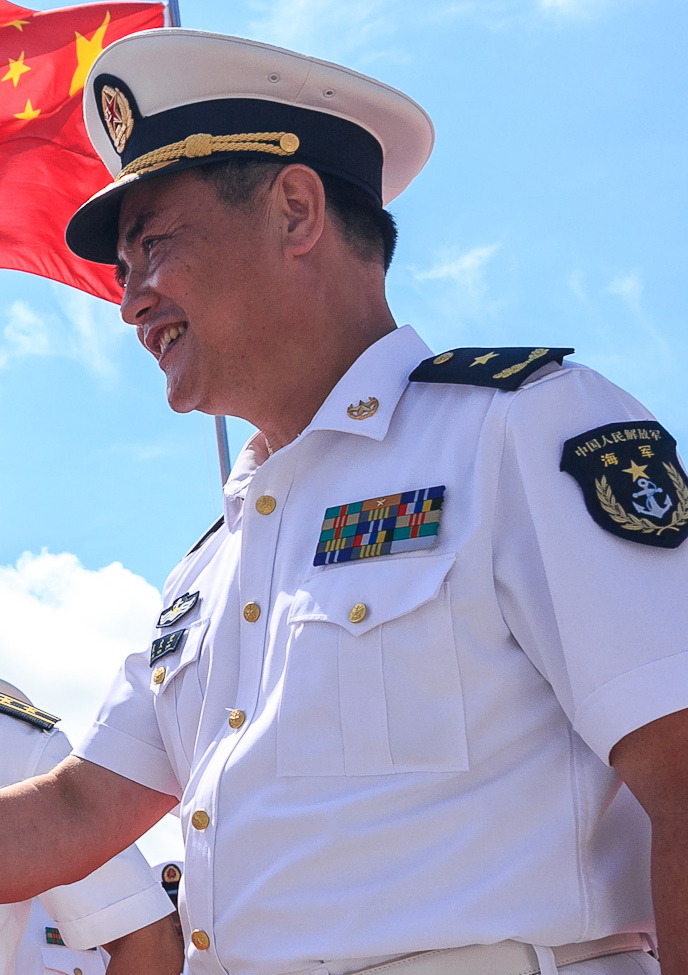
- Zhang Wendan in 2013

Chief of Staff of the People's Liberation Army Navy
- In office January 2018 – December 2019
- Commander: Shen Jinlong
- Preceded by: Qiu Yanpeng
- Succeeded by: Li Yujie

Commander of the North Sea Fleet
- In office January 2017 – January 2018
- Preceded by: Yuan Yubai
- Succeeded by: Li Yujie

Personal details
- Born: 1958 (age 67–68) Fuyang, Zhejiang, China
- Party: Chinese Communist Party

Military service
- Allegiance: China
- Branch/service: People's Liberation Army Navy
- Years of service: ? − 2019
- Rank: Vice Admiral

Zhang Wendan (Chinese: 张文旦; born 1958) is a retired vice admiral of the Chinese People's Liberation Army Navy. He served as Chief of Staff of the PLA Navy from January 2018 to December 2019, and previously served as Chief of Staff and Deputy Commander of the South Sea Fleet, Deputy Chief of Staff of the Southern Theater Command, and Commander of the North Sea Fleet (2017–2018). He commanded the PLA Navy's fifth Gulf of Aden anti-piracy task force in 2010.

== Biography ==
Zhang was born in 1958 in Fuyang, Zhejiang Province.

He spent most of his career in the South Sea Fleet (SSF), where he served as director of its ship training center, and commander of the 26th Speedboat Detachment. He rose to the position of deputy chief of staff of the SSF by 2010 and attained the rank of rear admiral the same year.

From 4 March until 12 September 2010, Zhang commanded the PLA Navy's fifth Gulf of Aden anti-piracy task force to the seas near pirate-infested Somalia. The flotilla, consisting of the missile destroyer Guangzhou, the missile frigate Chaohu, and the replenishment ship Weishanhu, sailed a record-breaking distance of 92,495 nautical miles over 192 days, and completed 41 missions escorting 588 Chinese and foreign ships. Before its return, the task force made official visits to Egypt, Italy, Greece, and Myanmar, and paid a port call in Singapore. The mission received substantial media coverage in China. During the mission Zhang Wendan paid a visit to a Japanese warship after Japanese naval captain Minami Takanobu boarded the Chinese ship earlier. The two sides exchanged information on pirate activity, a rare occasion of military cooperation between the two countries.

Zhang has enjoyed a rapid succession of promotions since March 2014, when he became chief of staff of the SSF. A year later he was appointed deputy commander of the SSF, and became deputy chief of staff of the Southern Theater Command by December 2016. Just a month later, he was transferred to the North Sea Fleet (NSF) to serve as its commander, succeeding Yuan Yubai, who had been promoted to commander of the Southern Theater Command. He served in the NSF for only a year, before being appointed Chief of Staff of the PLA Navy in January 2018, replacing vice-admiral Qiu Yanpeng. Zhang was promoted to the rank of vice-admiral in July 2018.
