= Tian Zhong =

Chinese Navy admiral

- 田中
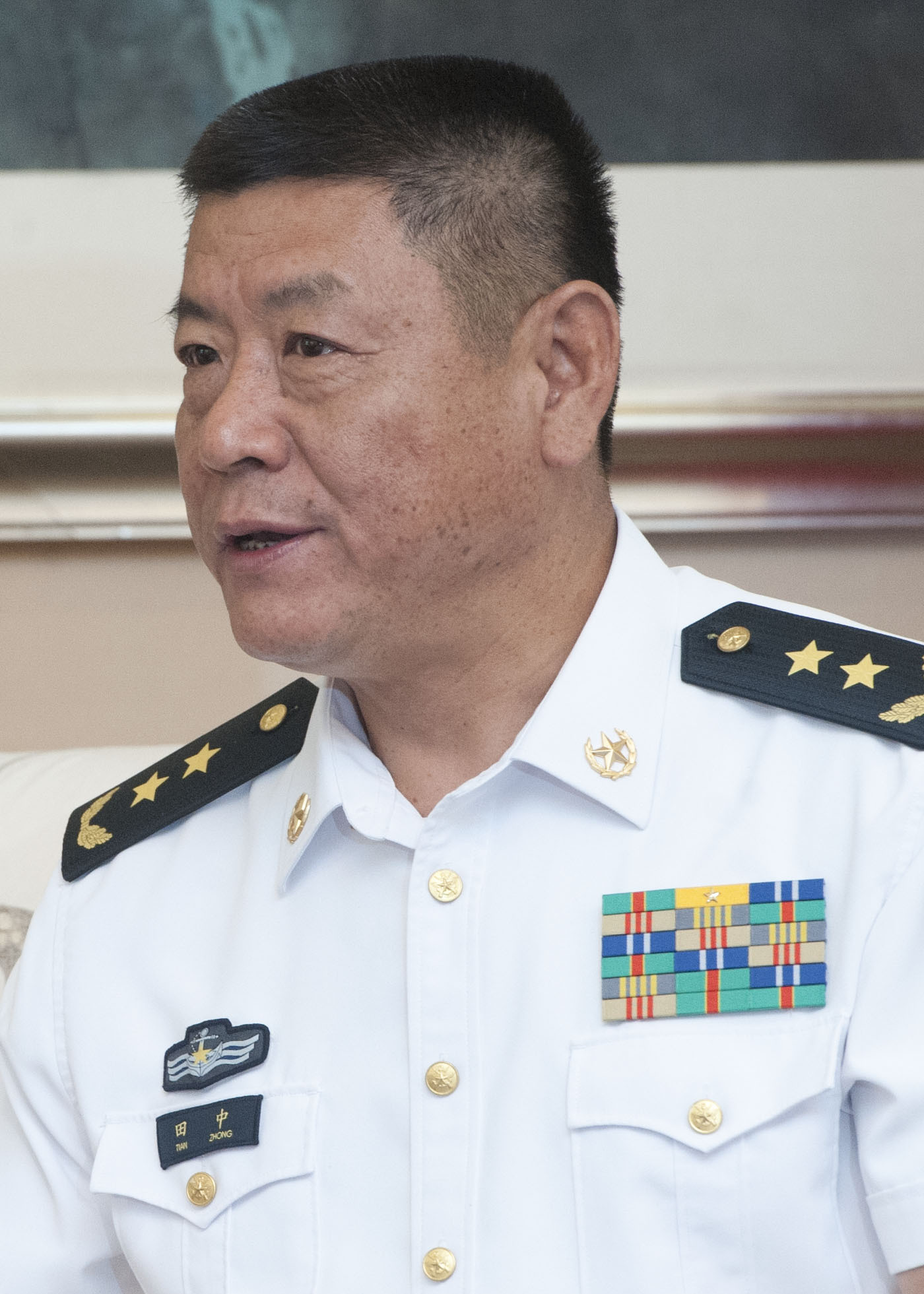
- Tian in 2012

Deputy Commander of the PLA Navy
- Incumbent
- Assumed office January 2014
- Commander: Wu Shengli

Commander of the North Sea Fleet
- In office January 2008 – December 2013
- Preceded by: Su Shiliang
- Succeeded by: Qiu Yanpeng

Personal details
- Born: 1956 (age 69–70) Huanghua, Hebei, China
- Party: Chinese Communist Party

Military service
- Allegiance: China
- Branch/service: People's Liberation Army Navy
- Years of service: 1974 − present
- Rank: Vice-Admiral

Tian Zhong (Chinese: 田中; born 1956) is a vice-admiral (zhong jiang) of the People's Liberation Army Navy (PLAN) of China. He has been deputy commander of the PLAN since 2014, and formerly served as commander of the North Sea Fleet.

== Early life ==
Tian Zhong was born in 1956 in Huanghua, Hebei Province.

== Career ==
Zhong joined the PLAN in 1974; he attained the rank of rear admiral in 2001 and vice-admiral in 2009.

From December 2007 to January 2014, Tian served as commander of the North Sea Fleet as well as deputy commander of the Jinan Military Region. He became deputy commander of the PLA Navy in January 2014, and Rear Admiral Qiu Yanpeng succeeded him as commander of the North Sea Fleet.

Tian Zhong was a member of the 18th Central Committee of the Chinese Communist Party.
