= List of ambassadors of China to the Central African Republic =

Coordinates: 4.381420°N 18.560526°E

Ambassador of China to the Central African Republic
- National emblem of China
- Inaugural holder: Chen Tse-kuei
- Formation: 1 August 1962; 64 years ago

The ambassador of China to the Central African Republic is the official representative of the People's Republic of China to the Central African Republic.

== List of representatives ==
Diplomatic agrément/Diplomatic accreditation	Ambassador	Chinese language zh:中国驻中非大使列表	Observations	List of premiers of China	List of heads of state of the Central African Republic	Term end
August 13, 1960			Independence from France:	Chen Cheng	David Dacko	
April 13, 1962			The governments in Taipei and Bangui established diplomatic relations.	Chen Cheng	David Dacko	
August 1, 1962	Chen Tse-kuei	陳澤溎	Representative: From December 1, 1965, to December 1, 1972, he was Chinese Ambassador to Madagascar.	Chen Cheng	David Dacko	November 1, 1964
April 29, 1964			The governments in Beijing and Bangui established diplomatic relations.	Zhou Enlai	David Dacko	January 1, 1966
January 14, 1965	Meng Ying	孟英	Meng Ying, and his wife arrived in Bangui on 31 December.: On January 14, 1965 he presented his credentials to David Dacko.; From April 1, 1964 to July 1, 1964, when Tanganyika and Zanzibar formed the United Republic of Tanzania he was ambassador in Zanzibar City; From August 1978 to July 1983 he was ambassador in Mongolia.	Zhou Enlai	David Dacko	January 1, 1966
May 1, 1968			The governments in Taipei and Bangui established diplomatic relations.	Yen Chia-kan	Jean-Bédel Bokassa	August 1, 1976
August 1, 1968	Hau Nai	许鼐	In septiembre de 1947 he was Cónsul en Phnom Penh (es:Anexo:Embajadores de China en Camboya).: On July 11, 1968, the Executive Yuan appointed Hsu Nao as ambassador to the Central African Republic	Yen Chia-kan	Jean-Bédel Bokassa	June 1, 1970
June 1, 1970	Leao Chung-chin	廖仲琴	Leao Tchong-kin	Yen Chia-kan	Jean-Bédel Bokassa	March 1, 1973
March 1, 1973	Kiding Wang	zh:王季征	(*March 26, 1914): From 1953 to 1957 he was es:Anexo:Embajadores de China en El Salvador.	Chiang Ching-kuo	Jean-Bédel Bokassa	August 1, 1974
August 1, 1976	Feng Yueh-tseng	zh:冯耀曾	Y. T. Feng (July 11, 1923, in Guangdong).: In 1966 he was ambassador in the Chad.; In 1973 he was director of the European Division of the Ministry of Foreign Affairs.; In 1975 he was appointed ambassador the Central African Republic.; In 1976 he was appointed director of the Department of African Affairs of the Ministry of Foreign Affairs.; In 1980 he was ambassador in Malawi.; He also served as director of the New York Office.; In 1992 he was retired.	Chiang Ching-kuo	Jean-Bédel Bokassa	August 1, 1976
August 20, 1976			The governments in Beijing and Bangui established diplomatic relations.	Hua Guofeng	Jean-Bédel Bokassa	July 1, 1991
November 19, 1976	Li Shi (PRC diplomat)	zh:李石 (外交官)	Central African Empire (Diplomatic relations reestablished 20 August 1976): Embassy, Bangui Ambassador Li Shih Nov 76 19 -Jul 78; Counselor Shen Shih-lien Jan 77 27 Mar 78 (Charge d'Affaires)	Hua Guofeng	Jean-Bédel Bokassa	January 1, 1982
November 1, 1982	Xu Jingwu	徐净武		Zhao Ziyang	André Kolingba	November 1, 1985
January 1, 1986	Zhou Xianjue	zh:周贤觉		Zhao Ziyang	André Kolingba	January 1, 1990
March 1, 1990	Zhao Huimin	zh:赵惠民		Li Peng	André Kolingba	July 1, 1991
July 1, 1991			The governments in Taipei and Bangui established diplomatic relations.	Hau Pei-tsun	André Kolingba	January 1, 1998
July 1, 1991	Huang Yun-cheh	黄允哲	Huang Yun- cheh: In 2002 he was ambassador in Senegal.	Hau Pei-tsun	André Kolingba	August 1, 1994
August 1, 1994	Liu Xiangpu	刘祥璞		Lien Chan	Ange-Félix Patassé	January 1, 1998
January 1, 1998			The governments in Beijing and Bangui established diplomatic relations.	Zhu Rongji	Ange-Félix Patassé	
April 1, 1998	Cui Yongqian	zh:崔永乾		Zhu Rongji	Ange-Félix Patassé	January 1, 2001
July 1, 2001	Wang Sifa	zh:王四法		Zhu Rongji	Ange-Félix Patassé	December 1, 2003
January 1, 2004	He Sijim	何泗记		Wen Jiabao	François Bozizé	August 1, 2007
August 1, 2007	Shi Hu (PRC diplomat)	石虎		Wen Jiabao	François Bozizé	March 1, 2011
April 1, 2011	Sun Haichao	孙海潮		Wen Jiabao	François Bozizé	December 1, 2014
December 1, 2014	Ma Fulin	马福林		Li Keqiang	Alexandre-Ferdinand Nguendet	March 11, 2023

== See also ==
- Central African Republic–China relations
