= Liu Zhuoming =

Chinese military personnel

- 刘卓明

Commandant of the PLA Naval Command Academy
- In office 2005–2010

Personal details
- Born: July 1954 (age 72) Dawu, Hubei, China
- Party: Chinese Communist Party
- Parent: Liu Huaqing (father)
- Relatives: Liu Chaoying (sister)
- Education: Changsha School of Engineering

Military service
- Allegiance: Chinese Communist Party
- Branch/service: People's Liberation Army Navy
- Years of service: ? − present
- Rank: Vice Admiral

Liu Zhuoming
- Simplified Chinese: 刘卓明
- Traditional Chinese: 劉卓明
Transcriptions
Standard Mandarin
- Hanyu Pinyin: Liú Zhuōmíng
- Wade–Giles: Liu Cho-ming

Liu Zhuoming (Chinese: 刘卓明; born July 1954) is a vice admiral (zhong jiang) of China's People's Liberation Army Navy (PLA Navy). He serves as Deputy Director of the PLA General Armament Department's Science and Technology Commission. He is the son of Admiral Liu Huaqing, former CMC vice-chairman and commander of the PLA Navy.

== Biography ==
Liu Zhuoming was born in Dawu County, Hubei Province in 1954. Liu Zhuoming received an undergraduate degree in computer engineering from the Changsha School of Engineering.

Liu was promoted to rear admiral in 2000. In 2001, he was appointed director of the Navy Equipment Proving Research Center (海军装备论证研究中心), the navy's main institution for developing and testing weapons, ships, and other technical systems. In 2003, this institution's name was changed to the Navy Equipment Research Institute (海军装备研究院).

From 2005 to 2010, Liu Zhuoming served as commandant of the PLA Naval Command Academy in Nanjing, Jiangsu Province. In February 2010, he served as general director of a joint exercise in applying information technology to command and control. In July 2010, Liu was promoted to deputy director of the Science and Technology Commission of the PLA General Armament Department. He is also a delegate to the 12th National People's Congress (2013–2018).

== Family ==
Liu Zhuoming is the son of Admiral Liu Huaqing, former vice-chairman of the Central Military Commission, commander of the PLA Navy, and an influential figure in PLA Navy history. His younger sister is Liu Chaoying. According to a leaked US diplomatic cable, an unnamed sister of Liu Zhuoming was a board member of Huawei and other Chinese military or quasi-military companies, and was involved in arms sales to foreign countries.
