= Liu Chaoying =

Chinese businesswoman

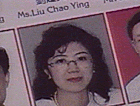
- Liu Chaoying
- Spouse: Pan Yue (politician) (divorced)
- Children: 1
- Father: Liu Huaqing
- Relatives: Liu Zhuoming (brother); Elizabeth Jelena Wang (daughter-in-law)

Liu Chaoying (劉超英), or Helen Liu, is a former executive at China Aerospace International Holdings which is the Hong Kong subsidiary of China's premier satellite developer, China Aerospace Science and Technology Corporation (中國航天科技集團公司). She is a Lt. Col. in the People's Liberation Army (PLA) of China. Liu played a major role in the 1996 United States campaign finance controversy.

== 1996 United States campaign finance controversy ==
According to The Washington Post, Johnny Chung met Liu in June 1996 through mutual business contacts in Hong Kong. Liu was looking for a foothold in Western markets. When she visited the U.S. in July 1996, Chung introduced her to Bill Clinton at a Los Angeles fund raiser. She and Chung also paid a call on the Securities and Exchange Commission in Washington, a meeting arranged by Massachusetts Senator John Kerry, another recipient of Chung's illegal contributions. On the agenda: the procedure for getting a foreign firm listed on American stock exchanges. On August 9, 1996, Liu and Chung formed Marswell Investment, a Los Angeles corporation that issued 50,000 shares of stock—30,000 for Liu, 20,000 for Chung. And within days, Liu wired $300,000 into Chung's account at a Hong Kong bank, a source familiar with the case told Time. Most of it was for their new business venture; some went to the D.N.C. Between 1994 and 1996, Chung donated $366,000 to the Democratic National Committee. Eventually, all of the money was returned. Chung told federal investigators that $35,000 of the money he donated came from China's military intelligence.

The relationship between Liu and Chung became increasingly apparent to officials within the intelligence community, and specifically with regards to U.S. National Security Council (NSC) aide Robert Suettinger, when Chung befriended former Lt. Col. Liu Chaoying during a Commerce Department trade mission to China.

Johnny Chung later testified under oath to the U.S. House Committee in May 1999 that he was introduced to Chinese general Ji Shengde, then head of China's military intelligence, by Liu Chaoying. Chung said that Ji told him: "We like your president very much. We would like to see him reelect [sic]. I will give you 300,000 U.S. dollars. You can give it to the president and the Democrat [sic] Party." Both Liu and the Chinese government denied the claims.

=== Other events ===
Ren Min Bao (人民報) reported that "Liu Chaoying, together with a business partner, were litigated by The Kwangtung Provincial Bank in January 2001, which filed civil proceedings in the Hong Kong High Court, alleging that Liu Chaoying and another unnamed businesswoman were the principals involved in a defaulted HK $10 million loan, as loan guarantor, and it ruled that the two are the responsible parties for the loan's repayment."

Sheri Yan and her husband Roger Uren, a former Office of National Assessments (ONA) official, were investigated by ASIO on suspicion of spying for China. Uren, former Assistant Secretary responsible for the Asia section of ONA, was found to have removed documents pertaining to Chinese intelligence operations in Australia, and kept them in his apartment. Yan was suspected of undertaking influence operations on behalf of the Chinese Communist Party, and introducing Colonel Liu Chaoying to Australian contacts.

== Personal life ==
Liu is the daughter of former PLA General Liu Huaqing, and her elder brother, Liu Zhuoming, is a vice admiral of China's People's Liberation Army Navy. She was formerly married to Pan Yue.
