= List of ambassadors of China to Tanzania =

Coordinates: 6.784051°S 39.286539°E

Chinese Ambassador to Tanzania
- Inaugural holder: He Ying
- Formation: 11 April 1962; 64 years ago

The Chinese ambassador to Tanzania is the official representative of the People's Republic of China to the United Republic of Tanzania.

== List of representatives ==
Diplomatic agrément/Diplomatic accreditation	Ambassador	Chinese language zh:中国驻坦桑尼亚大使列表	Observations	Premier of the People's Republic of China	List of heads of state of Tanzania	Term end
December 9, 1961			The governments in Beijing (People's Republic of China) and Dar es Salaam (Tanganyika) established diplomatic relations. In 1964, Tanganyika and Zanzibar formed the United Republic of Tanzania.	Zhou Enlai	Julius Nyerere	
April 11, 1962	He Ying (PRC diplomat)	zh:何英 (外交官)	(November 1914 - October 3, 1993): From September 1954 - August 1958 he was Chinese Ambassador to Mongolia.; From April 1963 - April 196 he was Chinese Ambassador to Uganda.; From April 11, 1962 to May 1969 he was Ambassador in Dar es Salaam.	Zhou Enlai	Julius Nyerere	May 1969
December 11, 1961			The governments in Beijing and Zanzibar City established diplomatic relations. In 1964, Tanganyika and Zanzibar formed the United Republic of Tanzania the embassy in Zanzibar City became a consulate.	Zhou Enlai	Abeid Karume	
April 7, 1964	Meng Ying	zh:孟英	From April 1, 1964 to July 1, 1964, when Tanganyika and Zanzibar formed the United Republic of Tanzania he was Ambassador in Zanzibar City.; (*native of Hebei): During the final stage of the revolutionary war Meng was political commissar of the Third Sub-District of the Shandong Military District.; In December 1950 he was counselor in Burma.; From January 1956 to January 1961 he was counselor in Ulaan Bator.; From March 1961 to 1963 he was deputy director of the West Asia and Africa Department.; In December 1962 he was Member of a delegation led by Huang Zhen to the United Arab Republic, Ghana, and Guinea.; From January 1965 to January 1966 he was the first Chinese Ambassador to the Central African Republic.; From August 1978 to July 1983 he was Chinese Ambassador to Mongolia and led the China-Mongolia Friendship Association.	Zhou Enlai	Abeid Karume	July 11, 1964
June 1969	Zhong Xidong	zh:仲曦东	From July 1961 to May 1969 he was Ambassador in Prague.	Zhou Enlai	Julius Nyerere	March 1972
April 1972	Li Yaowen	zh:李耀文	From April 1972 to January 1976 he was ambassador in Dar es Salaam.; From January 1973 to June 1974 he was accredited to Madagascar.; From October 1980 to April 1990 he was political commissar of the People's Liberation Army Navy .	Hua Guofeng	Julius Nyerere	January 1976
May 1976	Liu Chun	zh:刘春 (外交官)		Zhao Ziyang	Julius Nyerere	October 1979
February 1980	He Gongkai	zh:何功楷		Zhao Ziyang	Ali Hassan Mwinyi	April 1985
April 1985	Liu Qingyou	zh:刘庆有		Li Peng	Ali Hassan Mwinyi	January 1990
May 1990	Sun Guotong	zh:孙国桐		Li Peng	Ali Hassan Mwinyi	October 1993
January 1994	Xie Youkun	zh:谢佑昆		Li Peng	Benjamin William Mkapa	July 1997
September 1997	Zhang Hongxi	zh:张宏喜		Zhu Rongji	Benjamin William Mkapa	July 1999
September 1999	Wang Yongqiu	zh:王永秋		Zhu Rongji	Benjamin William Mkapa	March 2003
April 2002	Yu Qingtai	zh:于庆泰		Wen Jiabao	Jakaya Kikwete	August 2007
September 2007	Liu Xinsheng	zh:刘昕生		Wen Jiabao	Jakaya Kikwete	February 2012
February 1, 2012	Lu Youqing	吕友清		Wen Jiabao	Jakaya Kikwete	March 2013

== See also ==
- China–Tanzania relations
