= Yuan Yubai =

Chinese admiral

- 袁誉柏
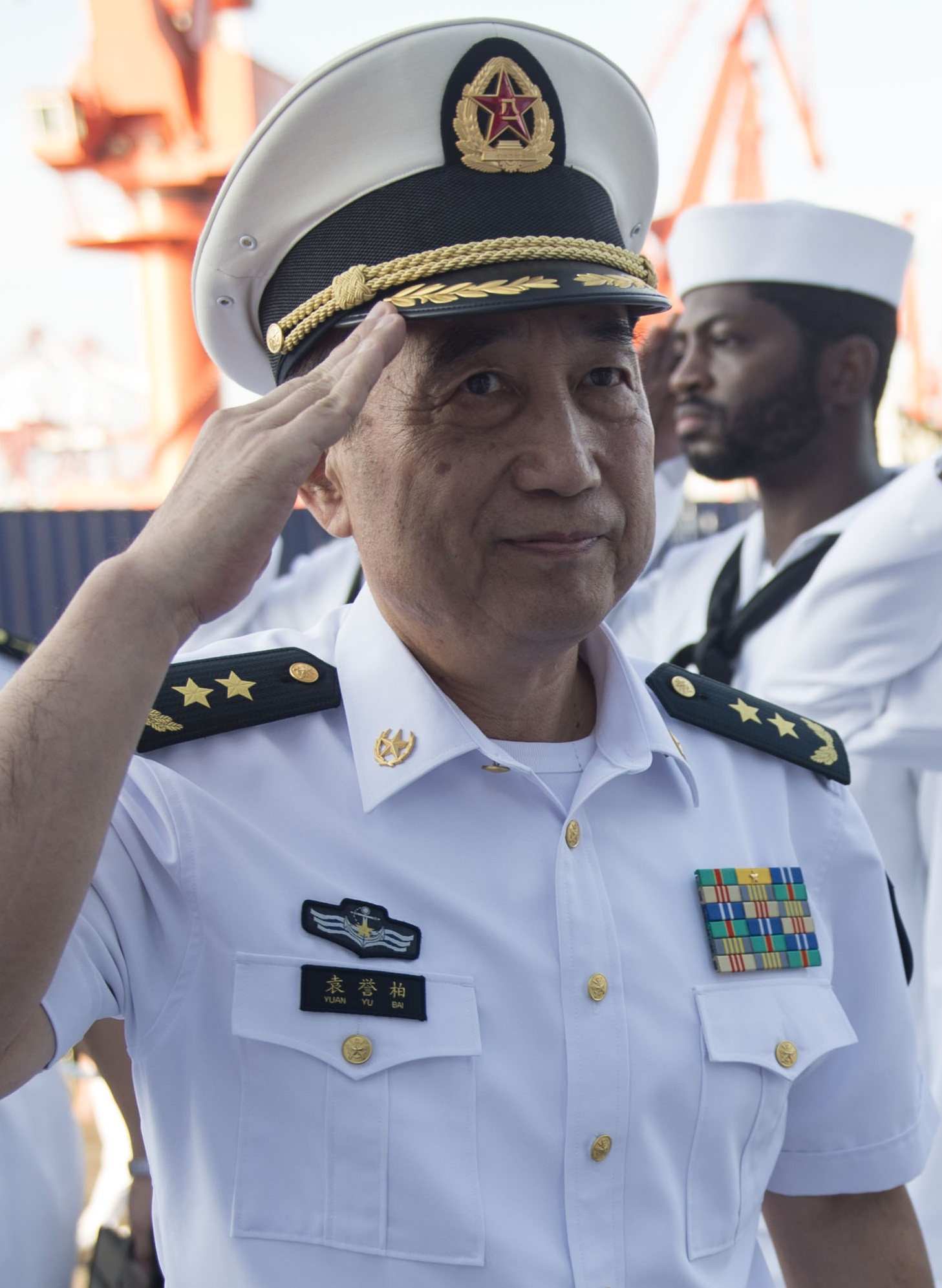

Commander of the Southern Theater Command
- In office January 2017 – June 2021
- Preceded by: Wang Jiaocheng
- Succeeded by: Wang Xiubin

Commander of the North Sea Fleet
- In office July 2014 – January 2017
- Preceded by: Qiu Yanpeng
- Succeeded by: Zhang Wendan

Personal details
- Born: May 1956 (age 70) Gong'an, Hubei
- Party: Chinese Communist Party
- Education: PLAN Submarine Academy

Military service
- Allegiance: China
- Branch/service: People's Liberation Army Navy
- Years of service: 1976 − present
- Rank: Admiral

Chinese name
- Simplified Chinese: 袁誉柏
- Traditional Chinese: 袁譽柏
Transcriptions
Standard Mandarin
- Hanyu Pinyin: Yuán Yùbǎi

Yuan Yubai (Chinese: 袁誉柏; born May 1956) is an admiral of the Chinese People's Liberation Army Navy (PLAN). He has been commander of the Southern Theater Command from January 2017 to June 2021 and formerly served as commander of the North Sea Fleet from 2014 to 2017.

== Biography ==
Yuan Yubai was born in 1956 in Gong'an County, Hubei Province. He graduated from Gong'an No. 2 High School in 1972 and PLAN Submarine Academy (Qingdao) in 1981.

Yuan has spent his entire military career up to 2017 in the North Sea Fleet. He served at the Qingdao Submarine Base after graduation from the submarine academy, rising to submarine captain by 1990. He was then promoted to chief of staff of the submarine base in 2004, and commander in 2007. He attained the rank of rear admiral in July 2008. He was appointed chief of staff of the North Sea Fleet in 2010, and deputy commander in 2013.

In July 2014, Yuan was promoted to commander of the North Sea Fleet, succeeding Qiu Yanpeng, who had been appointed chief of staff of the PLAN. In July 2015, Yuan and Qiu were both promoted to the rank of vice-admiral (zhong jiang).

In January 2017, Yuan was appointed commander of the Southern Theater Command, succeeding General Wang Jiaocheng. This was noted as a departure from the convention of having army officers serving as regional commanders. In July 2019, Yuan was promoted to the rank of admiral (shang jiang).

On 20 August 2021, he was appointed vice chairperson of the National People's Congress Social Development Affairs Committee.

Military offices
Preceded by Qiu Yanpeng	Commander of the North Sea Fleet; 2014–2017	Succeeded by Zhang Wendan
Preceded by Wang Jiaocheng	Commander of the Southern Theater Command; 2017–2021	Succeeded by Wang Xiubin
