= Wang Jiaocheng =

- 王教成

Commander of the Southern Theater Command
- In office February 2016 – January 2017
- Preceded by: New position
- Succeeded by: Yuan Yubai

Commander of the Shenyang Military Region
- In office October 2012 – January 2016
- Preceded by: Zhang Youxia
- Succeeded by: abolished

Personal details
- Born: 1952 (age 73–74) Hangzhou, Zhejiang, China
- Party: Chinese Communist Party
- Education: Zhejiang University High School

Military service
- Allegiance: People's Republic of China
- Branch/service: People's Liberation Army Ground Force
- Years of service: 1969–2017
- Rank: General
- Commands: Southern Theater Command; Shenyang Military Region

Chinese name
- Chinese: 王教成
Transcriptions
Standard Mandarin
- Hanyu Pinyin: Wáng Jiàochéng
Wu
- Wugniu: Wan^{2} Kau^{5}-dzen^{2}

Wang Jiaocheng (Chinese: 王教成; pinyin: Wáng Jiàochéng; born 1952) is a retired general of the Chinese People's Liberation Army Ground Force. He served as the inaugural Commander of the Southern Theater Command from 2016 to 2017. Prior to that he was the Commander of the Shenyang Military Region between 2012 and 2016, and Deputy Commander of the Nanjing Military Region from 2007 to 2012.

== Biography ==
Wang Jiaocheng was born in 1952 in Hangzhou, Zhejiang Province, of Lai'an, Anhui ancestry. He graduated from Zhejiang University High School, and joined the PLA in 1969. He served as Deputy Chief of Staff of the Nanjing Military Region from 2000 to 2005, Commander of the 12th Group Army from 2005 to 2007, and Deputy Commander of the Nanjing MR from 2007 to 2012. He became Commander of the Shenyang Military Region in 2012.

He attained the rank of major general in July 2000, lieutenant general (zhong jiang) in July 2009, and full general in July 2014.

On February 1, 2016, Wang was named commander of the re-organized Southern Theater Command.

Wang was a full member of the 18th Central Committee of the Chinese Communist Party.

Military offices
| Preceded by Qi Jianguo | Commander of the 12th Group Army; 2005–2007 | Succeeded by Han Weiguo |
| Preceded by Zhang Youxia | Commander of the Shenyang Military Region; 2012–2016 | Succeeded by Position revoked |
| New title | Commander of the Southern Theater Command; 2016–2017 | Succeeded by Yuan Yubai |
