= Jiang Guoping =

Chinese vice admiral

- 姜国平

Deputy Commander of the North Theater Command
- Incumbent
- Assumed office September 2019
- Preceded by: Wang Changjiang

President of Dalian Naval Academy
- In office 2011–2014
- Preceded by: Shen Jinlong
- Succeeded by: Li Yujie

Personal details
- Born: October 1962 (age 63–64) Rushan County, Shandong, China
- Party: Chinese Communist Party
- Education: Dalian Naval Academy

Military service
- Allegiance: People's Republic of China
- Branch/service: People's Liberation Army Navy
- Years of service: ?–present

Chinese name
- Simplified Chinese: 姜国平
- Traditional Chinese: 姜國平
Transcriptions
Standard Mandarin
- Hanyu Pinyin: Jiāng Guópíng

Jiang Guoping (Chinese: 姜国平; born October 1962) is a vice admiral (zhongjiang) of the People's Liberation Army (PLA) who has been deputy commander of the North Theater Command since September 2019. He served as a delegate to the 13th National People's Congress.

== Biography ==
Jiang was born into an official family in Rushan County, Shandong, in October 1962. He graduated from Dalian Naval Academy and served as its president from 2011 to 2014. In September 2014, he was commissioned as deputy chief of staff of the North Sea Fleet. In December, he became commander of the 19th Escort Formation of the People's Liberation Army Navy, responsible for the convoy of the Gulf of Aden. During his tenure, he was the commander of the Yemeni Overseas Chinese Evacuation Task Force. Within 12 days, he commanded the naval vessel to safely evacuate 897 Chinese and foreign citizens. In April 2015, he rose to become chief of staff of the North Sea Fleet. In January 2017, he was appointed assistant chief of staff of the Joint Staff Department of the Central Military Commission, serving in the post until September 2019, when he was given the position of deputy commander of the North Theater Command.

He was promoted to the rank of rear admiral (Shaojiang) in 2012 and vice admiral (zhongjiang) in December 2019.

Educational offices
Preceded by Shen Jinlong	President of Dalian Naval Academy; 2011–2014	Succeeded by Li Yujie
Military offices
Preceded by Wang Hai	Chief of Staff of the North Sea Fleet; 2015–2017	Succeeded by Wang Yongxiang (王永祥)
Preceded by Wang Changjiang	Deputy Commander of the North Theater Command; 2019–present	Incumbent
