= Shi Yunsheng =

Chinese retired naval aviator and admiral

- 石云生

5th Commander of the People's Liberation Army Navy
- In office November 1996 – June 2003
- Preceded by: Zhang Lianzhong
- Succeeded by: Zhang Dingfa

Personal details
- Born: 1940 (age 85–86) Fushun, Liaoning, China
- Party: Chinese Communist Party

Military service
- Allegiance: China
- Branch/service: People's Liberation Army Navy
- Years of service: 1962−2003
- Rank: Admiral

Shi Yunsheng (Chinese: 石云生; born 1940 in Fushun, Liaoning) is a retired naval aviator and admiral of the People's Liberation Army Navy (PLAN) of China. He was the fifth commander of the PLAN (1996–2003).

He was the commander of air force of South Sea Fleet, and was promoted to vice commander of air force of Navy in 1990. Two years later, he was promoted to vice commander of PLA Navy. In November 1996, he was appointed as commander in chief of the Navy. This was followed by a promotion to full admiral in 2000.

In June 2003, Shi was dismissed and forced into retirement after the fatal submarine 361 incident. He was replaced by Admiral Zhang Dingfa.

Shi was a member of the 15th and 16th Central Committees of the Chinese Communist Party.
