= Commander of the People's Liberation Army Navy =

Commanding officer of the People's Liberation Army Navy

- 中国人民解放军海军司令员
- Naval Ensign of the People's Republic of China

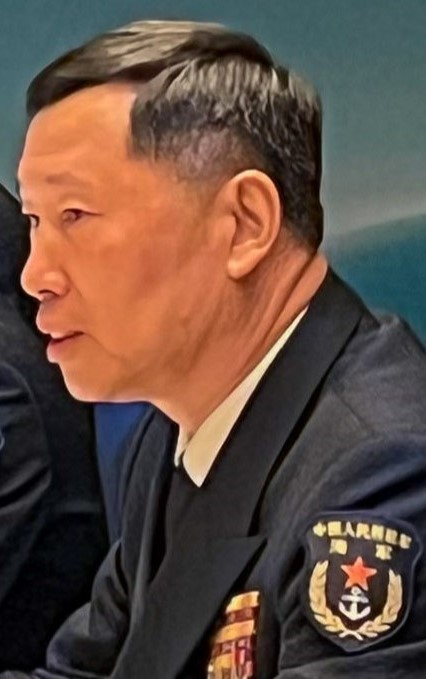
- Incumbent; Hu Zhongming since December 2023
- People's Liberation Army Navy
- Type: Commanding officer
- Reports to: Chief of the Joint Staff
- Appointer: Military Chairman
- Formation: 14 April 1950; 76 years ago
- First holder: Xiao Jinguang

The commander of the People's Liberation Army Navy (Chinese: 中国人民解放军海军司令员) is the commanding officer of the People's Liberation Army Navy (PLAN). The current commander is Admiral Hu Zhongming.

== History ==
The Navy of the People's Liberation Army Navy East China Military Area Command (华东军区海军) was originally established on April 23, 1949, in Baimamiao Township of Tai County, Jiangsu province, General Zhang Aiping was commissioned as commander and political commissar.

On April 14, 1950, the People's Liberation Army Navy Navy Command was established in Beijing, which is the China's highest naval organ. The Commander of the People's Liberation Army Navy Navy is nominated by the President for appointment from any eligible officers holding the rank of admiral or vice-admiral (shang jiang), and under the leadership of the Central Military Commission. Fleet Admiral Xiao Jinguang was the first commander of the People's Liberation Army Navy Navy.

== List of commanders ==
=== Commander of the People's Liberation Army Navy East China Military Area Command Navy ===
No.	Portrait	Commander	Took office	Left office	Time in office	Alma mater	Ref.
1	Zhang Aiping张爱萍	Zhang Aiping 张爱萍 (1910–2003)	23 April 1949	14 April 1950	356 days	Counter-Japanese Military and Political University	.

=== Commander of the People's Liberation Army Navy ===
No.	Portrait	Commander	Took office	Left office	Time in office	Alma mater	Ref.
1	Xiao Jinguang萧劲光	Fleet Admiral; Xiao Jinguang 萧劲光 (1903–1989)	14 April 1950	January 1980	29 years, 8 months	Moscow Sun Yat-sen University	.
2	Ye Fei叶飞	General; Ye Fei 叶飞 (1914–1999)	January 1980	August 1982	2 years, 7 months	Whampoa Military Academy	.
3	Liu Huaqing刘华清	Admiral; Liu Huaqing 刘华清 (1916–2011)	August 1982	January 1988	5 years, 5 months	N. G. Kuznetsov Naval Academy	.
4	Zhang Lianzhong张连忠	Admiral; Zhang Lianzhong 张连忠 (born 1931)	January 1988	November 1996	8 years, 10 months	Naval Submarine Institute	.
5	Shi Yunsheng石云生	Admiral; Shi Yunsheng 石云生 (born 1940)	November 1996	June 2003	6 years, 7 months	People's Liberation Army; National Defence University	.
6	Zhang Dingfa张定发	Admiral; Zhang Dingfa 张定发 (1943–2006)	June 2003	April 2006	2 years, 10 months	People's Liberation Army; National Defence University	
7	Wu Shengli吴胜利	Admiral; Wu Shengli 吴胜利 (born 1945)	April 2006	January 2017	10 years, 9 months	People's Liberation Army; Institute of Surveying and Mapping	
8	Shen Jinlong沈金龙	Admiral; Shen Jinlong 沈金龙 (born 1956)	January 2017	6 September 2021	4 years, 8 months	.	.
9	Dong Jun董军	Admiral; Dong Jun 董军 (born 1961)	6 September 2021	26 December 2023	2 years, 3 months	.	
10	Hu Zhongming胡中明	Admiral; Hu Zhongming 胡中明 (born 1964)	26 December 2023	Incumbent	2 years, 9 months	.	
