= Zhang Dingfa =

People's Liberation Army Navy admiral

- 张定发

6th Commander of the People's Liberation Army Navy
- In office June 2003 – August 2006
- Preceded by: Shi Yunsheng
- Succeeded by: Wu Shengli

President of the PLA Academy of Military Science
- In office November 2002 – June 2003
- Preceded by: Ge Zhenfeng
- Succeeded by: Zheng Shenxia

Commander of the North Sea Fleet
- In office November 1996 – December 2000
- Preceded by: Wang Jiying
- Succeeded by: Ding Yiping

Personal details
- Born: 8 December 1943 Pudong, Shanghai, China
- Died: 14 December 2006 (aged 63) Beijing, China
- Party: Chinese Communist Party
- Education: PLAN Submarine Academy

Military service
- Allegiance: China
- Branch/service: People's Liberation Army Navy
- Years of service: 1960–2006
- Rank: Admiral

Chinese name
- Traditional Chinese: 張定發
- Simplified Chinese: 张定发
Transcriptions
Standard Mandarin
- Hanyu Pinyin: Zhāng Dìngfā
Wu
- Wugniu: Tsan^{1} Din^{6}-faq^{7}

Zhang Dingfa (simplified Chinese: 张定发; traditional Chinese: 張定發; pinyin: Zhāng Dìngfā; 8 December 1943 – 14 December 2006) was a submariner and admiral of China's People's Liberation Army Navy (PLAN), who served as Commander of the PLAN from 2003 to 2006. Prior to that, he served as President of the PLA Academy of Military Science and Commander of the North Sea Fleet.

Zhang became the PLA Navy commander in the aftermath of the fatal submarine 361 accident in 2003. He initiated reforms to improve maintenance and training of the naval force, but stepped down three years later because of cancer, and died soon afterwards.

== Early life and career ==
Zhang Dingfa was born on 8 December 1943 to a workers' family in Pudong, Shanghai. After graduating from Yangsi High School, he was admitted to the PLAN Submarine Academy in 1960. He joined the Chinese Communist Party in March 1964.

After graduating from the Submarine Academy in July 1964, Zhang joined the PLAN's submarine force, and participated in the development of China's nuclear submarines. He became a deputy submarine commander in 1971, and commander in 1975.

In August 1985, Zhang became chief of staff of the Qingdao Naval Base of the PLAN's North Sea Fleet, and he attained the rank of rear admiral in June 1991. He was then promoted to chief of staff of the North Sea Fleet in 1993, deputy commander in 1995, and commander of the North Sea Fleet and concurrently deputy commander of the Jinan Military Region in 1996. He became a vice admiral in July 1998, and a deputy commander of the PLA Navy in December 2000.

In November 2002, Zhang was appointed president of the PLA Academy of Military Science, the first naval officer to hold the position.

== Command of the PLA Navy ==
Following a fatal accident with the Type 035 Ming-class submarine 361 in April 2003, Admiral Shi Yunsheng was removed from his position as Commander of the PLA Navy. Zhang Dingfa was chosen as his replacement partly because of his background as a career submariner, in an era when the PLA Navy was relying on its submarines in the event of a possible conflict with the United States over the Taiwan Strait issue. In September 2004, he was promoted to the rank of admiral, and became a member of the Central Military Commission (CMC). He was the first naval commander to become a CMC member.

As commander, Zhang initiated steps to reform the PLA Navy in the aftermath of the Ming 361 accident, including reorganizing the chain of command to improve accountability for maintenance and emphasizing training for more realistic scenarios. After serving for three years, however, Zhang was forced to step down in August 2006 because of terminal cancer. He was replaced by Admiral Wu Shengli, who continued his reforms.

== Death ==
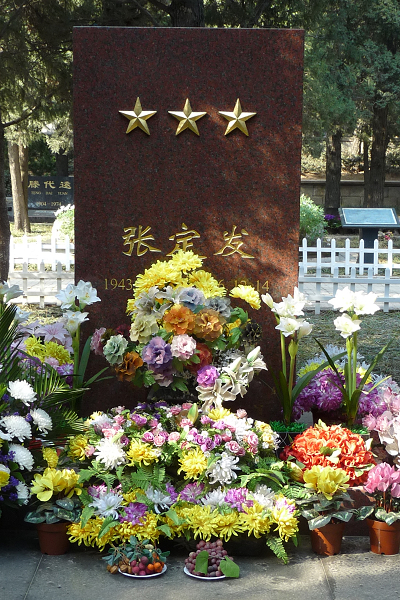
Zhang Dingfa's tomb in Babaoshan

On 14 December 2006, Zhang Dingfa died in Beijing. President Hu Jintao and Vice President Zeng Qinghong were among those who attended his funeral. He was cremated and buried at the Babaoshan Revolutionary Cemetery.

Military offices
Preceded by Wang Jiying	Commander of the North Sea Fleet; 1996–2000	Succeeded by Ding Yiping
Preceded by Ge Zhenfeng	President of the PLA Academy of Military Sciences; 2002–2003	Succeeded by Zheng Shenxia
Preceded by Shi Yunsheng	Commander of the People's Liberation Army Navy; 2003–2006	Succeeded by Wu Shengli
