= Liu Zhe =

- 刘喆

Captain of Chinese aircraft carrier Liaoning
- Incumbent
- Assumed office 2016
- Preceded by: Zhang Zheng

Personal details
- Born: China
- Party: Chinese Communist Party
- Education: Chinese People's Public Security University; PLA Academy of Military Science

Military service
- Allegiance: China
- Branch/service: People's Liberation Army Navy
- Rank: Rear Admiral

Liu Zhe (simplified Chinese: 刘喆; traditional Chinese: 劉喆; pinyin: Liú Zhé) is a People's Liberation Army Navy officer serving as the captain of the Chinese aircraft carrier Liaoning since May 2016.

== Biography ==
Liu was born into a military family. After graduating from Chinese People's Public Security University in 1993, he was recruited into military service. He completed his doctor's degree in science of strategy from People's Liberation Army Academy of Military Sciences. After graduation, he became an officer on the frigate Jiaxing (嘉兴号护卫舰), and four years later he was promoted to the rank of captain. In 2016, he was appointed captain of the Chinese aircraft carrier Liaoning replacing Zhang Zheng.

Military offices
Preceded by Zhang Zheng	Captain of Chinese aircraft carrier Liaoning; 2016–present	Incumbent
