= Chinese submarine 361 =

Submarine involved in fatal 2003 incident

History

China
- Name: No. 361

General characteristics
- Class & type: Type 035 submarine
- Displacement: 1,584 tonnes (1,559 long tons) surfaced; 2,113 tonnes (2,080 long tons) submerged
- Length: 76 m (249 ft 4 in)
- Beam: 7.6 m (24 ft 11 in)
- Draft: 5.1 m (16 ft 9 in)
- Propulsion: 2 × Shaanxi 6E 390 ZC1 diesels rated at 5,200 hp (3.82 MW); 2 × Xiangtan alternators; 2 shafts
- Speed: 15 knots (28 km/h; 17 mph) surfaced; 18 knots (33 km/h; 21 mph) submerged
- Complement: 55 (9 officers)
- Armament: 6 × bow torpedo tubes; 2 × stern torpedo tubes

The submarine hull No. 361 named Great Wall #61 was a Chinese People's Liberation Army Navy Type 035AIP (ES5E variant) (NATO reporting name Ming III) conventional diesel/electric submarine. In April 2003, during a military exercise in the Yellow Sea between North Korea and China's Shandong Province, the vessel suffered a mechanical failure that killed all 70 crew members on board. It was one of China's worst peacetime military disasters. The PLA Navy's Commander Shi Yunsheng and Political Commissar Yang Huaiqing were both dismissed as a result of the accident.

== Background ==
No. 361 was part of the 12th Submarine Brigade of the North Sea Fleet of the PLA Navy based at Lüshunkou in Liaoning Province. It was a Type 035G (Ming III-class) submarine. These were derivatives of Soviet Project 633 Romeo-class submarines, which themselves were derivatives of German World War II advanced Type XXI diesel/electric U-boats.

An ex-US Navy submarine captain told CNN that China was increasing training and exercises of its submarines in the east to carry out a policy of "sea denial" to counter the United States Pacific Fleet.

== Fatal incident ==
According to the official Chinese news agency Xinhua, all 70 crew members died when the submarine's diesel engine used up all available oxygen (because it had failed to shut down properly) while the boat was submerged on April 16, 2003. The submarine, which was commanded by Commodore Cheng Fuming (程福明), had been taking part in naval exercises east of Inner Changshan Islands in the Yellow Sea off the coast of Northeastern China. Along with its normal complement, the crew included 13 trainee cadets from the Chinese naval academy.

After the disaster, the crippled submarine drifted for ten days because it was on a silent, no-contact exercise. The boat was discovered by Chinese fishermen who noticed its periscope protruding above the surface on April 25, 2003. The crew were slumped over at their stations, seemingly having died before becoming aware of any issue.

At a press conference on May 8, 2003, Foreign Ministry spokesperson Zhang Qiyue stated that while on an exercise east of Changshan Islands, the No. 361 submarine was incapacitated by a mechanical problem and all 70 on board had perished. The submarine had been towed to a port as of the time of the press conference. The submarine was initially towed to Yulin Harbor near Sanya on Hainan Island before being taken back to the northeast seaport of Dalian in Liaoning province.

== Investigation ==
Hong Kong Wen Wei Po and U.S. The Boston Globe revealed the investigation established that No. 361 experienced a fatal accident on April 16, 2003 while returning to its base in Qingdao. As a diesel/electric submarine, No. 361 periodically needed to recharge its batteries. This recharging process involved starting the diesel generator, which requires an external air source due to the high oxygen consumption of diesel engines. Normally, this is achieved either by surfacing and opening the hatches or by ascending to snorkel depth and raising the air intake snorkel above the water surface.

The crew, following operational procedures, attempted to use the snorkel. However, a mechanical failure prevented the air induction valve from opening properly, leaving the snorkel effectively closed. Nevertheless, the crew started the diesel engine. Consequently, the diesel generator rapidly depleted the available oxygen within the submarine in less than two minutes, leading to the suffocation and loss of all personnel on board. Another consequence was the creation of negative pressure relative to the outside air, making it extremely difficult to open the outward-swinging hatch for escape, should anyone have remained conscious.

== Aftermath ==
On May 2, 2003, Central Military Commission (CMC) chairman Jiang Zemin said in a condolence message to the families of the dead that "the officers and sailors of 361 remembered their sacred duty entrusted to them by the Party and the people. They died on duty, sacrificed themselves for the country, and they are great losses to the People's Navy."

CMC Vice-chairman Guo Boxiong led an inquiry into the incident, which resulted in the dismissal or demotion of five senior PLA Navy officers in June 2003: Navy Commander Shi Yunsheng (replaced by Zhang Dingfa) and Political Commissar Yang Huaiqing; North Sea Fleet Commander Ding Yiping, Political Commissar Chen Xianfeng (陈先锋), and Chief of Staff Xiao Xinnian. Ding Yiping had been groomed to be the candidate for Navy Commander, but was removed from contention after the accident. Admiral Wu Shengli eventually succeeded Zhang Dingfa as Commander.
