= Dong Jun =

Chinese admiral

Admiral Dong Jun
- 董军
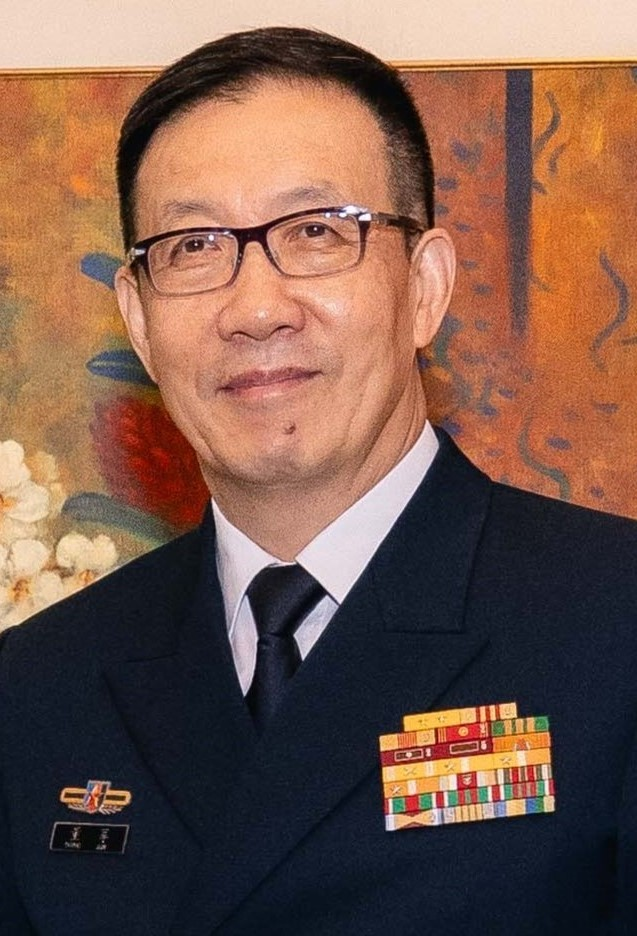
- Dong in 2024

14th Minister of National Defense
- Incumbent
- Assumed office 29 December 2023
- Premier: Li Qiang
- CMC Chairman: Xi Jinping
- Preceded by: Li Shangfu

9th Commander of the People's Liberation Army Navy
- In office September 2021 – December 2023
- Preceded by: Shen Jinlong
- Succeeded by: Hu Zhongming

Personal details
- Born: October 1961 (age 65) Yantai, Shandong, China
- Party: Chinese Communist Party
- Education: Dalian Naval Academy

Military service
- Allegiance: People's Republic of China
- Branch: People's Liberation Army Navy
- Service years: 1979–present
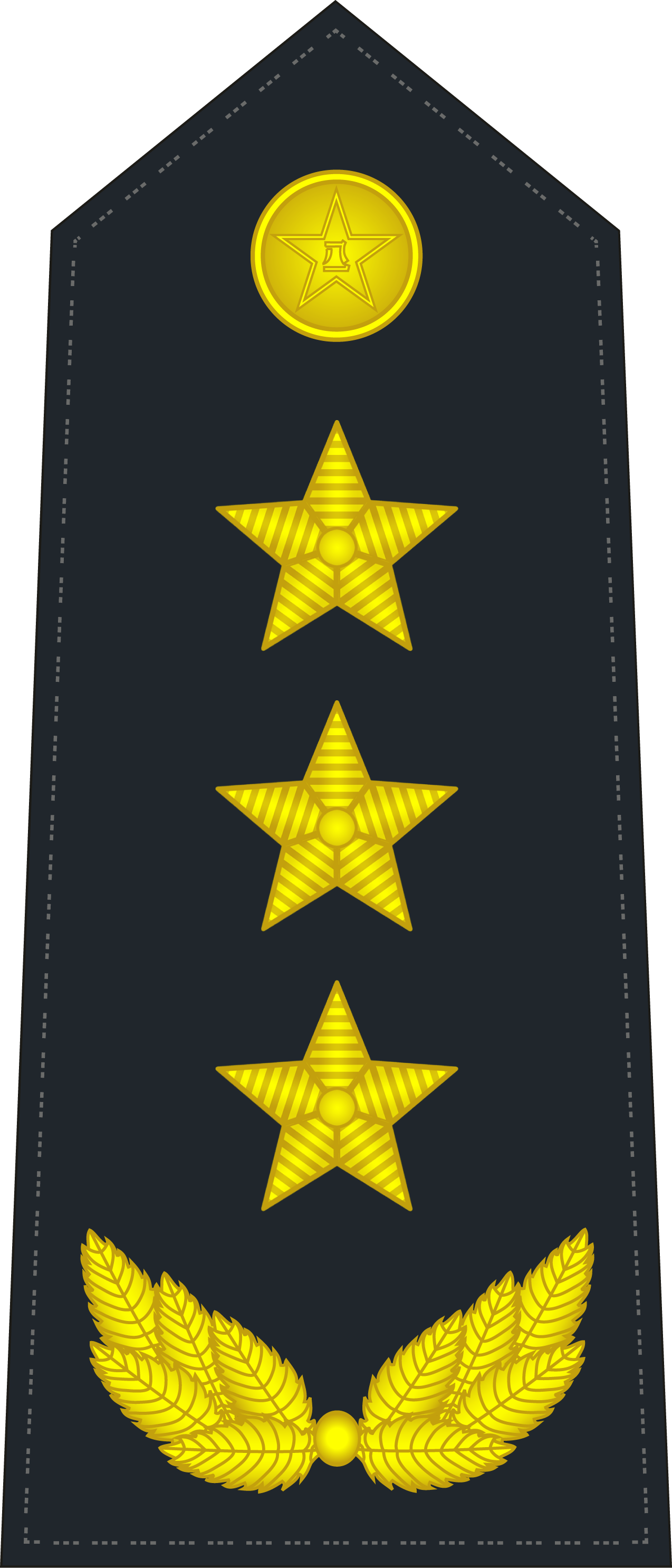
- Rank: Admiral

Chinese name
- Simplified Chinese: 董军
- Traditional Chinese: 董軍
Transcriptions
Standard Mandarin
- Hanyu Pinyin: Dǒng Jūn

Dong Jun (Chinese: 董军; pinyin: Dǒng Jūn; born in October 1961) is a Chinese admiral of the People's Liberation Army Navy (PLAN). He has been serving as the 14th Minister of National Defense of China since December 2023. He is China's first defense minister from the Navy.

Dong entered the Dalian Naval Academy for undergraduate studies in 1978 and joined the People's Liberation Army Navy service right after graduation. He served as the deputy commander of PLA Southern Theater Command from January 2017 to March 2021, as the deputy commander of the PLA Navy from March to August 2021, and as the 9th commander of the PLA Navy from September 2021 to December 2023.

== Biography ==
In 1978, Dong was admitted to the Dalian Naval Academy for undergraduate studies, and entered PLA Navy service after graduation. He has been director of the PLA Navy Command Military Training Department, the deputy chief of staff of the North Sea Fleet, and commander of the 92269 unit.

Dong became deputy commander of the East Sea Fleet in 2013, the PLA Navy deputy chief of staff in December 2014, and then deputy commander of Southern Theater Command in January 2017. In March 2021, he became deputy commander of the PLA Navy, and then its commander in August 2021. He was named as the commander of the PLA Navy in September 2021.

He was promoted to the rank of rear admiral (shaojiang) in July 2012, vice admiral (zhongjiang) in July 2018, and admiral (shangjiang) in September 2021. He has been associated with National University of Defense Technology as an adjunct professor since 2013.

=== Minister of National Defense ===
On 29 December 2023, the Standing Committee of the National People's Congress appointed Dong as the Minister of National Defense. He was the first defense minister with a naval background; one observer called it the "biggest surprise of 2023" for the PLA. According to political scientist Wen-Ti Sung, the selection of Dong as the defense minister was possibly a sign of ongoing purges within the PLA Rocket Force and the Central Military Commission (CMC)'s Equipment Development Department. Some articles wrote that since, unlike his predecessors, Dong was not a member of the CMC, he might not have the full decision-making authority but execution authority instead within the PLA.

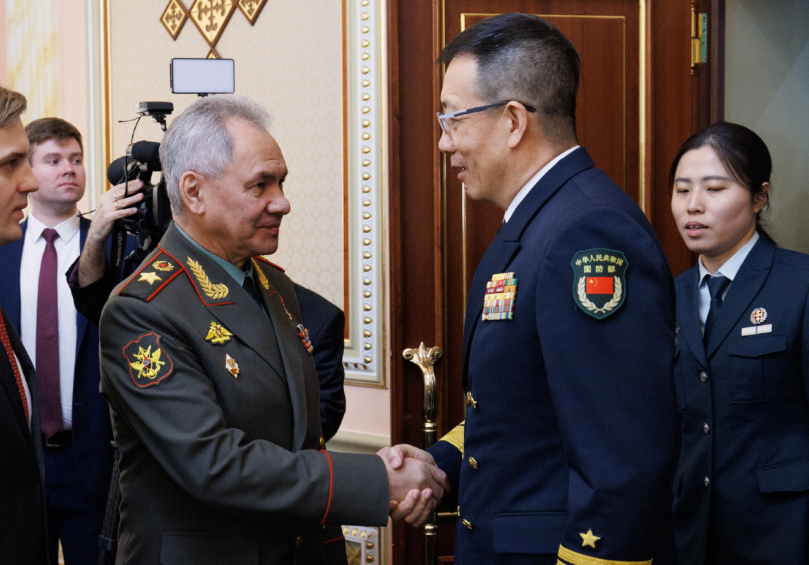
Dong meeting Russian Defense Minister Sergei Shoigu in Almaty, Kazakhstan (2024)

On 31 January 2024, Dong met with Russian Defense Minister Sergei Shoigu via teleconference, his first international engagement. During the meeting, Dong stated the militaries of Russia and China should be bolstering mutual trust and expanding cooperation to "elevate the relations between the two militaries to a higher level." According to the transcript of the meeting released by the Russian Defense Ministry, Dong stated that China would continue to support Russia on the 'Ukraine issue', and despite pressure from the United States and the European Union, "China will not abandon its established policies and the outside world will not interfere with normal cooperation between China and Russia." When asked about Dong's statements at a press briefing, Foreign Ministry of China spokesperson Wang Wenbin stated that China's position remains unchanged and does not provide military aid to either side of the conflict. On 11 April, he met with his Vietnamese counterpart Phan Văn Giang at Lào Cai province near the China-Vietnam border and the two ministers signed a memorandum of understanding to establish an emergency hotline between the Chinese and Vietnamese militaries. On 27 April, he took part in the Shanghai Cooperation Organisation defense ministers' meeting in Almaty, Kazakhstan where he met with defense ministers of Pakistan, Iran, Russia, Kyrgyzstan and Belarus, and held separate talks with defense ministers of Uzbekistan and Tajikistan. Prior to the defense ministers meeting, on April 26, he met with high-ranking Kazakhstani politicians including President of Kazakhstan Kassym-Jomart Tokayev.

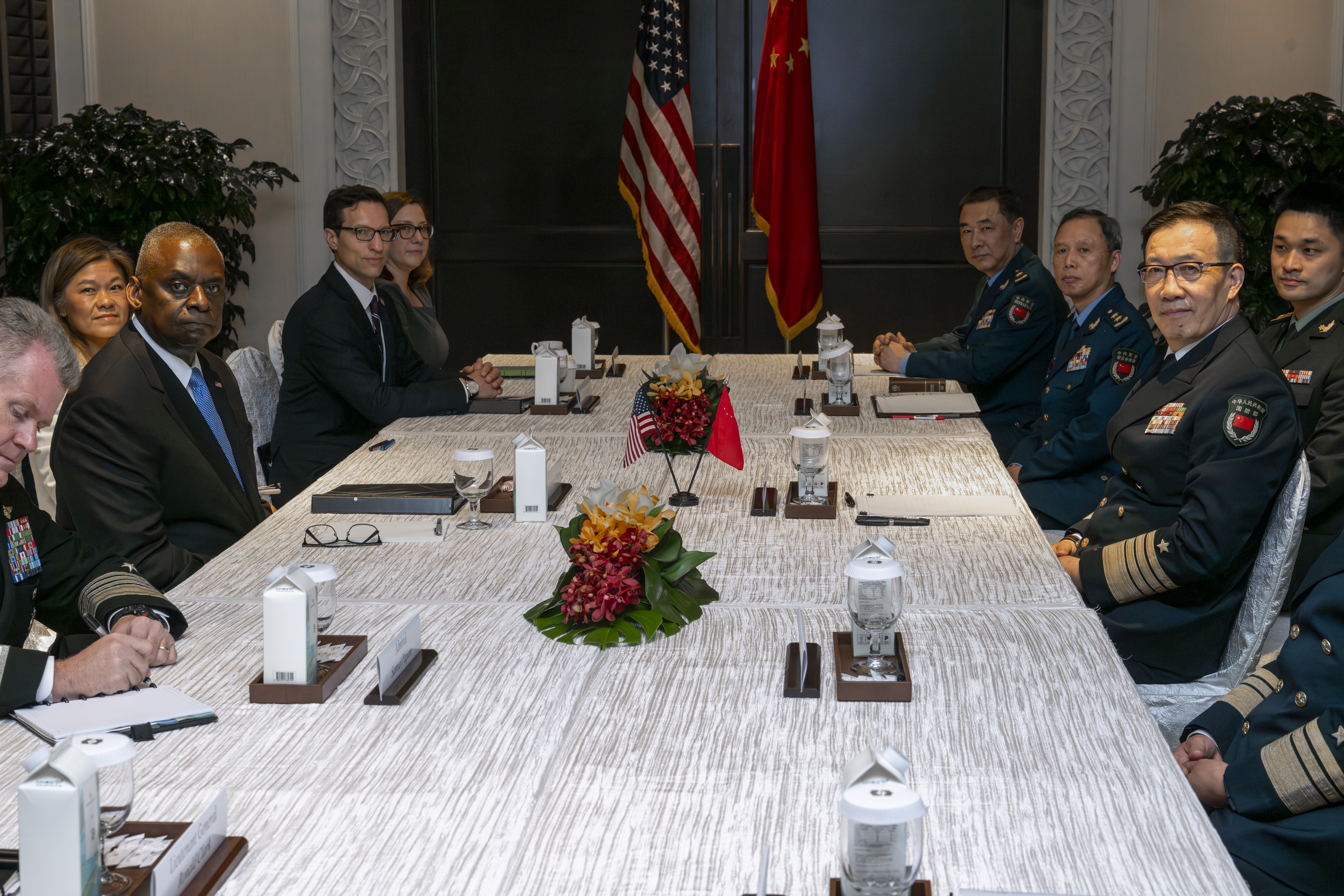
United States Secretary of Defense Lloyd Austin meeting with Dong at the 2024 Shangri-La Dialogue in Singapore (2024)

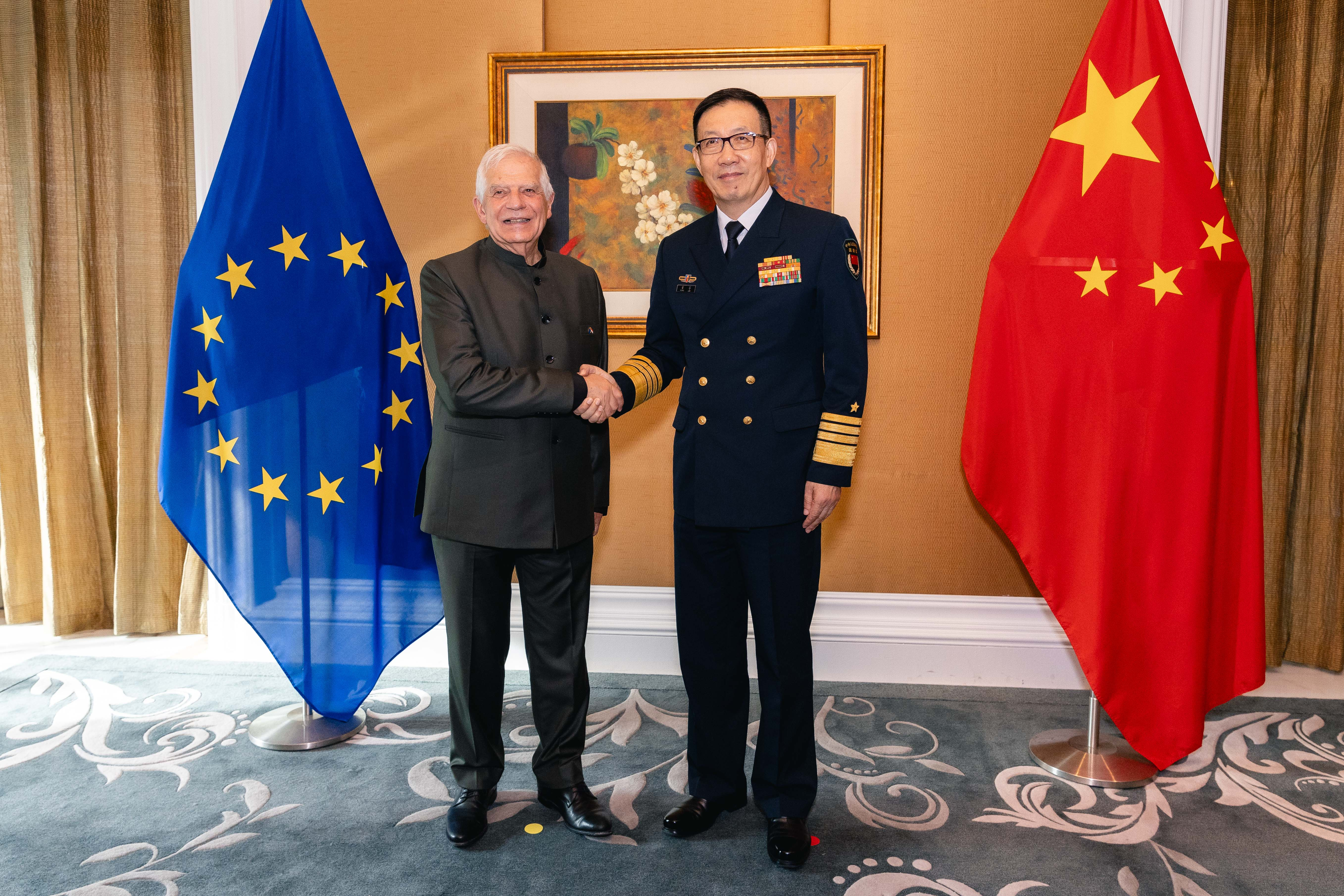
Dong with EU foreign policy chief Josep Borrell, 31 May 2024

On 31 May 2024, Dong attended the 2024 Shangri-La Dialogue in Singapore where he met with United States Secretary of Defense Lloyd Austin. During the meeting, which was Austin's first with a Chinese counterpart, the two agreed to resume military-to-military communication between the two countries while also at the same time, Austin raised the issues of Chinese military exercises near Taiwan and China's support for Russia's military industry during the Russian invasion of Ukraine. On 2 June, at a speech at the forum, Dong stated that China stays committed to "peaceful reunification" with Taiwan but "this prospect is increasingly being eroded by separatists for Taiwan independence and foreign forces." He also stated that China "will take resolute actions to curb Taiwan independence and make sure such a plot never succeeds." He also warned against U.S. arms sale to Taiwan stating that "this kind of behavior sends very wrong signals to the Taiwan independence forces and makes them become very aggressive." Regarding the ongoing confrontations between Chinese Coast Guard and Philippine fishing boats near the disputed reefs in the South China Sea, Dong stated "China has maintained sufficient restraint in the face of rights infringements and provocation" but warned that there are "limits to this."

On 14 October 2024, Dong met with Russian Defense Minister Andrey Belousov in Beijing. They called on both sides to "deepen strategic collaboration" and "continuously advance military relations." On 20 November 2024, Dong held high-level talks with his Indian counterpart Rajnath Singh on the sidelines of 11th ASEAN Defence Ministers' Meeting-Plus at Vientiane, Laos. The meeting between the two defence ministers came after the Indian and Chinese militaries completed disengagement of troops at friction points at the Line of Actual Control between the two countries. During the meeting, Singh called for reflecting on the "lessons learnt from the 2020 border clashes, take measures to prevent recurrence of such events and safeguard peace and tranquillity along the India-China border." In May 2025, Dong visited France, where he met with French Minister of the Armed Forces Sébastien Lecornu on 13 May. This was followed by a visit to Germany, where he spoke at the sixth UN Peacekeeping Ministerial on 14 May and he met with defense minister Boris Pistorius on 15 May. On 16 September 2026, Dong attended the Beijing Xiangshan Forum, where he said the world was at a "fragile moment", and called for a fresher and more equal approach to resolving world tensions. He also said "We must bear in mind the lessons of history and remain highly vigilant against all latent manifestations of hegemony, militarism and historical revisionism". In November 2026, Dong visited Italy, marking the first visit by a Chinese defense minister to the country since 2008. He met with Italian defense minister Guido Crosetto in Rome, and visited Brindisi, where he held talks aboard naval supply vessel Atlante with senior Italian naval officials. This was followed by a visit to the United Kingdom, marking the first visit by a Chinese defense minister to the UK in 26 years, where he met with British Defense Secretary Wes Streeting.

==== Corruption allegation ====
In late November 2024, former and current U.S. officials who spoke to the Financial Times stated that Dong was under investigation due to suspicion of corruption. In an enquiry about Dong at the Ministry of Foreign Affairs of China press conference on 27 November, Foreign Ministry spokesperson Mao Ning called the reports regarding investigation on Dong as "groundless" and "shadow chasing", while spokesperson of the Ministry of National Defence Wu Qian called the reports as "pure fabrications" at a press briefing and further stated that "the rumour-mongers are ill-intentioned" and "China expresses its strong dissatisfaction with such slanderous behaviour." In April 2025, the Financial Times reported that Dong had undergone an initial investigation but appeared to have his case be cleared.

Military offices
Preceded by Shen Jinlong	Commander of the People's Liberation Army Navy; 2021–2023	Succeeded by Hu Zhongming
Government offices
Preceded by General Li Shangfu	Minister of National Defense; 2023–present	Incumbent
