= Li Yaowen =

Chinese admiral

- 李耀文
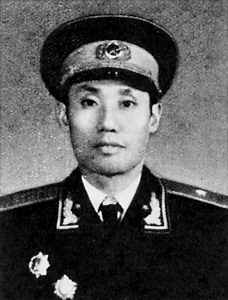
- In 1955

Political Commissar of the People's Liberation Army Navy
- In office October 1980 – April 1990
- Preceded by: Ye Fei
- Succeeded by: Wei Jinshan

Political Commissar of the Commission for Science, Technology and Industry for National Defense
- In office April 1977 – January 1980
- Succeeded by: Chen Jide (zh:陈继德)

Chinese Ambassador to Madagascar
- In office 1975–1976
- Preceded by: New position
- Succeeded by: Tian Zhidong (田志东)

Chinese Ambassador to Tanzania
- In office 1972–1975
- Preceded by: Zhong Xidong (仲曦东)
- Succeeded by: Liu Chun (刘春)

Vice-Minister of Foreign Affairs
- In office July 1970 – April 1972

Deputy Political Commissar of Jinan Military Region
- In office October 1965 – April 1970

Director of the Political Department of Jinan Military Region
- In office May 1955 – January 1968
- Preceded by: New position

Personal details
- Born: Zhang Xishen (张锡绅); 1 May 1918 Chengshan, Rongcheng, Shandong, China
- Died: 10 April 2018 (aged 99) Beijing, China
- Party: Chinese Communist Party
- Education: PLA Military Academy
- Occupation: Military officer, diplomat
- Awards: Red Star Medal; Order of Independence and Freedom; Order of Liberation

Military service
- Allegiance: People's Republic of China
- Branch/service: People's Liberation Army Ground Force; People's Liberation Army Navy
- Years of service: 1937–1997
- Rank: Admiral
- Commands: Jinan Military Region
- Battles/wars: Second Sino-Japanese War; Chinese Civil War; Korean War; Chinese Vietnamese Sea Battle

Li Yaowen (Chinese: 李耀文; pinyin: Lǐ Yàowén; 1 May 1918 – 10 April 2018), born Zhang Xishen (张锡绅), was an admiral in the Chinese People's Liberation Army.

Born in Rongcheng, Shandong, Li participated in the revolution at the age of 16 and joined the Chinese Communist Party at the age of 19, and fought many battles as a senior military officer of the People's Liberation Army in the Chinese Civil War, Korean War and the Chinese Vietnamese Sea Battle. He was promoted to the rank of major general (shaojiang) by age 37 and general (jiang) in September 1988. He served as political commissar of the People's Liberation Army Navy (PLA Navy) between 1980 and 1990, deputy political commissar of Jinan Military Region from 1965 to 1970, and director of the Political Department of Jinan Military Region from 1955 to 1968, when he was succeeded by Chen Jide. During the Cultural Revolution he entered diplomatic service and assumed various posts in the Ministry of Foreign Affair including vice-minister (1970–72), the Chinese Embassy to Tanzania (1972–75) and Chinese Embassy to Madagascar (1975–76).

He was an alternate member of the 11th CCP Central Committee, a member of the 12th CCP Central Committee, and a member of the Central Advisory Commission.

== Biography ==
=== Early life and education ===
Li was born Zhang Xishen in Chengshan Town of Rongcheng County, Shandong, on May 1, 1918. He attended the No. 1 School of Rongcheng County.

=== Agrarian Revolution ===
After school, he entered the workforce. He successively worked in the county's Education Bureau, Library and Education Museum.

After the September 18th incident, he came under the influence of the Communist Cao Manzhi (曹漫之), and began to read Marxist books.

In 1933, Li was transferred to the Education Museum as an administrator, at the same time, he worked as a member of the underground Party and gathered top secret information for the CCP Jiaodong County Committee.

In 1934, Li Yaowen and Cao Manzhi used the Education Museum as a base for they propagating patriotism and communism.

=== Second Sino-Japanese War ===
In 1937, Li joined the Chinese Communist Party under the recommendation of Cao Manzhi. On July 7, the Marco Polo Bridge Incident broke out, Li served as the commissary in charge of publicity in the newly established CCP Rongcheng County Committee, and Cao Manzhi served as its secretary. At the end of 1937, Li Yaowen, Cao Manzhi and Lin Hujia launched armed insurrection and the troops joined the 3rd Army of the Counter-Japanese and National Salvation Army of the Shandong People (山东人民抗日救国军第三军).

From January 1938 to August 1945, he organized the struggle against Japan in many areas of Shandong. After the surrender of Japan in December 1945, he was political commissar of the 9th Division of the Central Shandong Military District.

=== Chinese Civil War ===
In January 1947, he led his troops joined the Battle of South Shandong, and then participated in the Battle of Laiwu and the Battle of Menglianggu.

In January 1948, he became the deputy director of the 8th Column of the East China Field Army, rising to director in May. In June, his troops joined the Battle of Kaifeng and the Battle of East Henan. In November, he participated in the Huaihai Campaign led by Liu Bocheng, Su Yu, Chen Yi and Deng Xiaoping in north China.

In April 1949, he joined the Crossing River Campaign and then seized the city of Shanghai.

=== People's Republic of China ===
When the Korean War broke out, Li Yaowen received the order of the Central Military Commission and participated in the Korean War campaign led by Peng Dehuai.

In July 1954, Li was appointed director of the Political Department of Shandong Military District, which was reorganized as Jinan Military Region, one of the thirteen military regions in China. In September, Li attained the rank of major general (shaojiang) and was decorated the Order of Independence and Freedom, 2nd Class and the Order of Liberation, 1st Class. He served as Jinan Military Region director until 1968, when he was succeeded by Chen Jide (zh:陈继德).

In October 1965, Li was promoted to deputy political commissar of Jinan Military Region.

In April 1970, Premier Zhou Enlai appointed Li as vice-minister of Foreign Affairs.

On September 13, 1971, Lin Biao tried to flee the Soviet Union but he suffered an air crash and died in Ondorhaan, Mongolia. After receiving the valuable information provided by the Chinese Embassy in Mongolia, Li proved Lin's death.

In April 1972, Mao Zedong appointed him to become the Chinese Ambassador to Tanzania.

In 1975, he was appointed as the Chinese Ambassador to Madagascar, and held that office until February 1976.

In 1976, Hua Guofeng and Ye Jianying overthrew the Gang of Four. In April 1977, he served as political commissar of the Commission for Science, Technology and Industry for National Defense, serving as an assistant of General Zhang Aiping. In August, he was elected an alternate member of the 11th CCP Central Committee.

In October 1980, he was promoted to become political commissar of the People's Liberation Army Navy (PLA Navy).

In September 1982, he was elected a member of the 12th CCP Central Committee.

In October 1987, he became a member of the Central Advisory Commission.

On March 14, 1988, the Vietnam People's Navy invaded the Johnson South Reef, and killed some Chinese soldiers. In reprisal, Li commanded the army to fight back and won the war. In September, Li was awarded the military rank of Admiral (shangjiang).

Li retired in July 1998, and that same year, the Chinese government bestowed its Red Star medal, 1st Class upon him.

=== Death ===
On April 10, 2018, Li died in Beijing, three weeks shy of becoming a centenarian.

Military offices
| Preceded by New position | Director of the Political Department of Jinan Military Region; 1955–1968 | Succeeded by Chen Jide |
| Preceded by Ye Fei | Political Commissar of the People's Liberation Army Navy; 1980–1990 | Succeeded by Wei Jinshan |
Diplomatic posts
| Preceded by Zhong Xidong | Chinese Ambassador to Tanzania; 1972–1975 | Succeeded by Liu Chun |
| Preceded by New position | Chinese Ambassador to Madagascar; 1975–1976 | Succeeded by Tian Zhidong |
