= Hu Zhongming =

Chinese military officer

- 胡中明
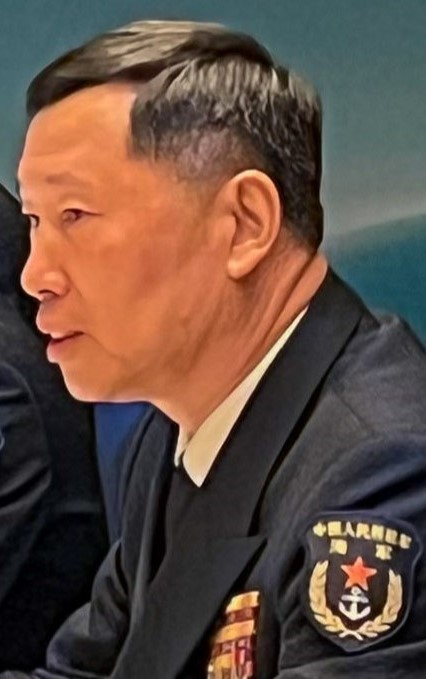
- Hu in 2024

10th Commander of the People's Liberation Army Navy
- Incumbent
- Assumed office 26 December 2023
- Preceded by: Dong Jun

Chief of Staff of the People's Liberation Army Navy
- In office December 2021 – December 2023
- Preceded by: Li Yujie
- Succeeded by: Li Hanjun

Commander of Northern Theater Command Navy
- In office December 2019 – December 2021
- Preceded by: Li Yujie
- Succeeded by: Wang Dazong

Personal details
- Born: January 1964 (age 62) Qingdao, Shandong, China
- Party: Chinese Communist Party

Military service
- Allegiance: People's Republic of China
- Branch/service: People's Liberation Army Navy
- Years of service: 1979–present
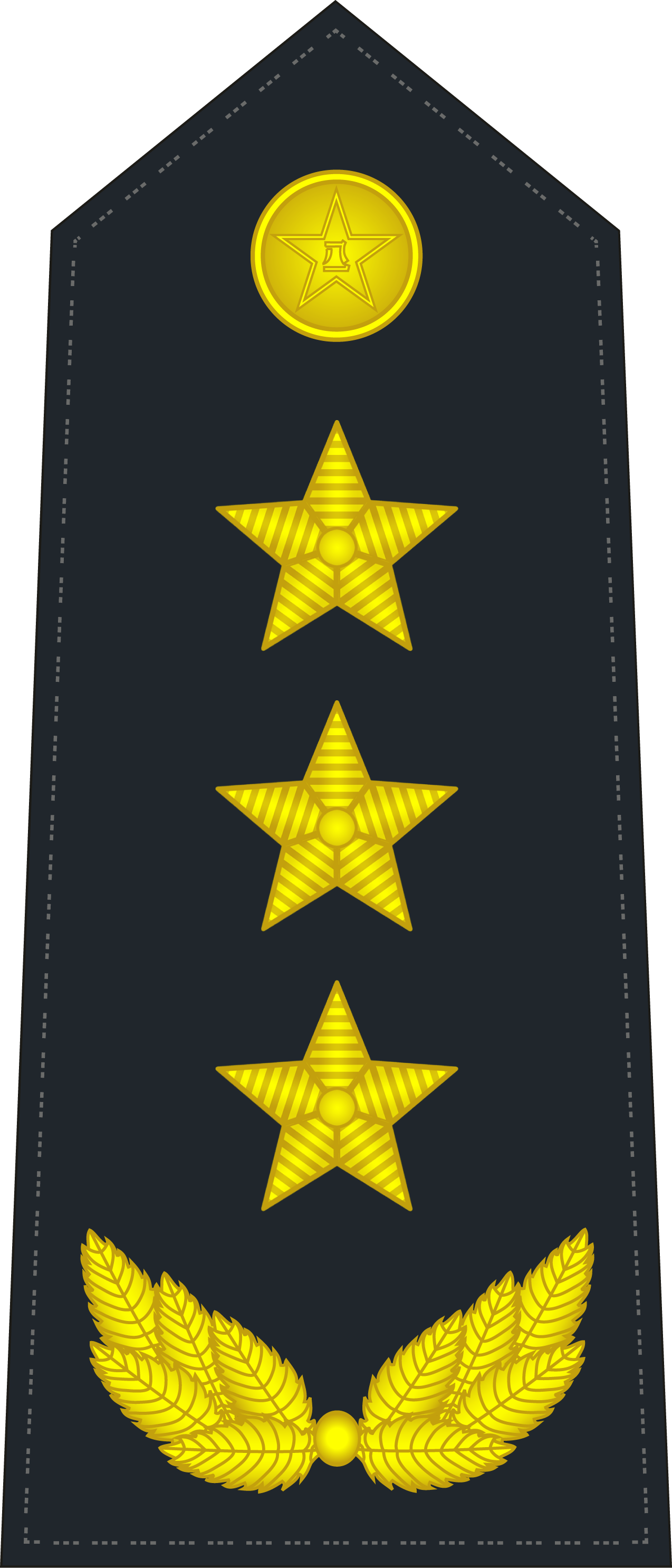
- Rank: Admiral

Hu Zhongming (Chinese: 胡中明; pinyin: Hú Zhōngmíng; born January 1964) is an admiral (shangjiang) of the People's Liberation Army (PLA) who has been the commander of the People's Liberation Army Navy since December 2023. He previously served as commander of the North Sea Fleet and deputy commander of the Northern Theater Command from December 2019 to December 2021 and the Chief of Staff of the PLA Navy from December 2021 to December 2023.

== Biography ==
Hu enlisted in the People's Liberation Army in 1979. He was an assistant chief of staff of the PLA Navy in March 2015 and then deputy chief of staff in May 2016. In December 2019, he was promoted to commander of the North Sea Fleet and deputy commander of the Northern Theater Command, succeeding Li Yujie. In December 2023, he was announced to be the commander of the PLA Navy, succeeding Dong Jun.

He was promoted to the rank of rear admiral (Shaojiang) in July 2014, vice admiral (zhongjiang) in December 2019, and admiral (shangjiang) in December 2023.

Military offices
| Preceded by Li Yujie | Commander of Northern Theater Command Navy; 2019–2021 | Succeeded by Wang Dazhong (military officer) |
| Preceded by Li Yujie | Chief of Staff of the People's Liberation Army Navy; 2021–2023 | Succeeded by Li Hanjun |
| Preceded by Dong Jun | Commander of the People's Liberation Army Navy; 2023–present | Incumbent |
