= Ma Xinchun =

Chinese naval officer (1925–2024)

- 马辛春
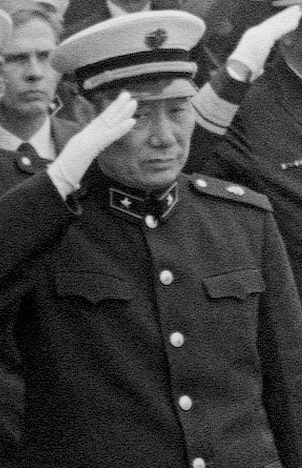
- Xinchun in 1986

Commander of the North Sea Fleet
- In office July 1985 – June 1990
- Preceded by: Su Jun
- Succeeded by: Qu Zhenmou

Personal details
- Born: March 1925 Julu County, Zhili Province, China
- Died: 22 October 2024 (aged 99) Beijing, China
- Party: Chinese Communist Party
- Education: PLA Naval Academy

Military service
- Allegiance: People's Republic of China
- Branch/service: People's Liberation Army Navy
- Years of service: 1940–1990
- Rank: Vice admiral
- Battles/wars: Chinese Civil War
- Awards: Order of Independence and Freedom 3rd Class (1955); Order of Liberation 3rd Class (1955)

Chinese name
- Simplified Chinese: 马辛春
- Traditional Chinese: 馬辛春
Transcriptions
Standard Mandarin
- Hanyu Pinyin: Mǎ Xīnchūn

Birth name
- Simplified Chinese: 马子元
- Traditional Chinese: 馬子元
Transcriptions
Standard Mandarin
- Hanyu Pinyin: Mǎ Zǐyuán

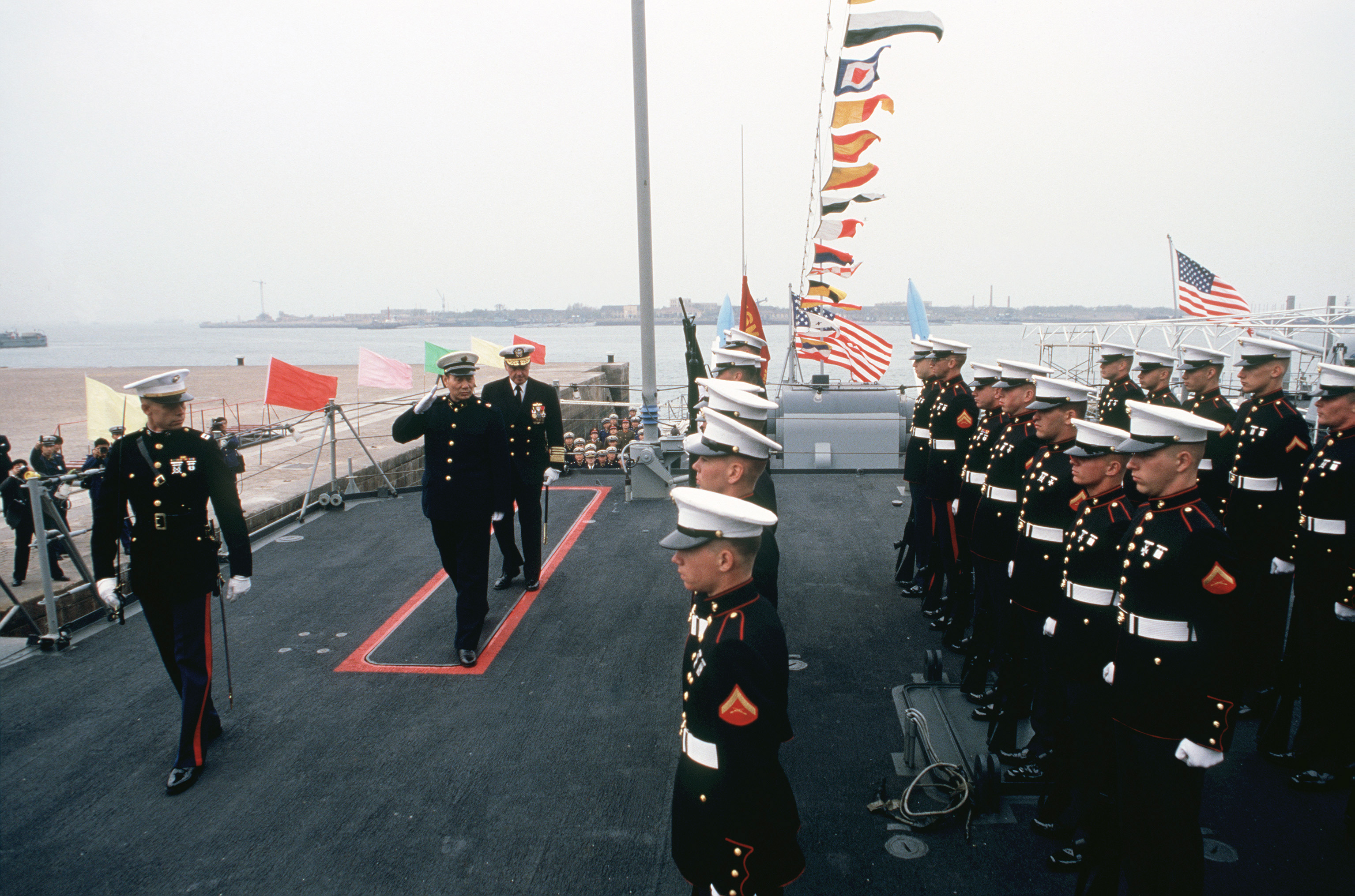
Ma Xinchun reviews an U.S. Marine Corps honor guard aboard an U.S. Navy ship.

Ma Xinchun (Chinese: 马辛春; March 1925 – 22 October 2024) was a vice admiral (zhongjiang) in the People's Liberation Army Navy of China who served as commander of the North Sea Fleet (now Northern Theater Command Navy) from 1985 to 1990.

Ma was a delegate to the 7th National People's Congress.

== Biography ==
Ma was born in Julu County, Zhili Province (now Hebei), in March 1925.

Ma joined the Chinese Communist Party (CCP) in September 1938, and enlisted in the Eighth Route Army in February 1940.

During the Chinese Civil War, Ma engaged in the Battle of northern Henan, Battle of Dabie Mountains, Yangtze River Crossing campaign, and Battle of southwestern China.

In 1952, Ma was transferred to the People's Liberation Army Navy (PLA Navy) and served as a chief of the Operations Department of the PLA Navy Command.

In August 1960, Ma enrolled at the PLA Naval Academy, where he graduated in August 1961.

In December 1970, Ma was appointed vice president of the 1st PLA Naval Academy.

In December 1977, Ma became deputy commander of the Yantai Naval Base, rising to commander in June 1981.

In August 1982, Ma was commissioned as chief of staff of the PLA Navy.

Ma was commander of the North Sea Fleet (now Northern Theater Command Navy) in July 1985, in addition to serving as deputy commander of the Jinan Military Region since September 1987. He attained the rank of vice admiral (zhongjiang) in 1988.

=== Personal life and death ===
Ma married Yang Shuhuan (杨曙环), the couple had a son and a daughter.

On 22 October 2024, Ma died in Beijing at the age of 99.

== Autobiography ==
- 人生航迹 [Life Trajectory] (in Chinese). Beijing: Huaxia Publishing House. 2013.

Military offices
Preceded by Su Jun	Commander of the North Sea Fleet; 1985–1990	Succeeded by Qu Zhenmou
