= Li Yujie (admiral) =

Chinese military officer

- 李玉杰

Deputy Commander of the People's Liberation Army Navy
- Incumbent
- Assumed office December 2021

Chief of Staff of the People's Liberation Army Navy
- In office December 2019 – December 2021
- Preceded by: Zhang Wendan
- Succeeded by: Hu Zhongming

Commander of the Northern Theater Command Navy
- In office December 2017 – December 2019
- Preceded by: Zhang Wendan
- Succeeded by: Hu Zhongming

Personal details
- Born: December 1962 (age 63) Laizhou County, Shandong, China
- Party: Chinese Communist Party
- Education: Dalian Naval Academy; PLA Naval Land Warfare Academy

Military service
- Allegiance: People's Republic of China
- Branch/service: People's Liberation Army Navy
- Years of service: 1981–present
- Rank: Vice admiral

Chinese name
- Simplified Chinese: 李玉杰
- Traditional Chinese: 李玉傑
Transcriptions
Standard Mandarin
- Hanyu Pinyin: Lǐ Yùjié

Li Yujie (Chinese: 李玉杰; born December 1962) is a vice admiral (zhongjiang) of the People's Liberation Army (PLA) who has been deputy commander of the People's Liberation Army Navy since December 2021. He served as a delegate to the 19th National Congress of the Chinese Communist Party.

== Biography ==
Li was born in Laizhou County (now Laizhou), Shandong, in December 1962. He enlisted in the People's Liberation Army Navy in September 1981. He graduated from Dalian Naval Academy and PLA Naval Land Warfare Academy. He once served as captain of the Chinese destroyer Qingdao (113). He was deputy chief of staff of the North Sea Fleet in April 2012 and commander of Shanghai Marine Police District of the PLA Navy five months later. In October 2014, he was made president of Dalian Naval Academy, nd held that office until September 2015, when he was soon commissioned as chief of staff of the South Sea Fleet. In May 2016, he was assigned to command the PLA Navy Logistics Department, a position he held until December 2017, while was reassigned to the North Sea Fleet as commander. In December 2019, he was given the position of Chief of staff of the People's Liberation Army Navy, succeeding Zhang Wendan. In December 2021, Hu Zhongming was appointed to replace him as Chief of staff of the PLA Navy.

He was promoted to the rank of rear admiral (Shaojiang) in 2012 and vice admiral (zhongjiang) in June 2019.

Educational offices
Preceded by Jiang Guoping	President of Dalian Naval Academy; 2014–2015	Succeeded by Yan Zhengming (严正明)
Military offices
Preceded by Guo Yujun	Chief of Staff of the South Sea Fleet; 2015–2016	Succeeded by Wang Houbin
Preceded by Wei Gang (PLA Navy)	Head of the PLA Navy Logistics Department; 2016–2018	Succeeded by Liu Zizhu (刘子柱)
Preceded by Zhang Wendan	Commander of the Northern Theater Command Navy; 2017–2019	Succeeded by Hu Zhongming
Preceded by Zhang Wendan	Chief of Staff of the People's Liberation Army Navy; 2019–2021	Succeeded by Hu Zhongming
