= Dalian Naval Academy =

Military academy in Dalian, China

- 中国人民解放军海军大连舰艇学院
- Logo of the Dalian Naval Academy
- Motto: 献身 严格 图强 求实
- Motto in English: Dedication, Strictness, Strength, Realism
- Type: Military academy
- Established: November 22, 1949; 76 years ago
- Location: 667 Jiefang Road, Zhongshan District, Dalian, Liaoning, China; 38.874132°N 121.660483°E
- Location in Liaoning

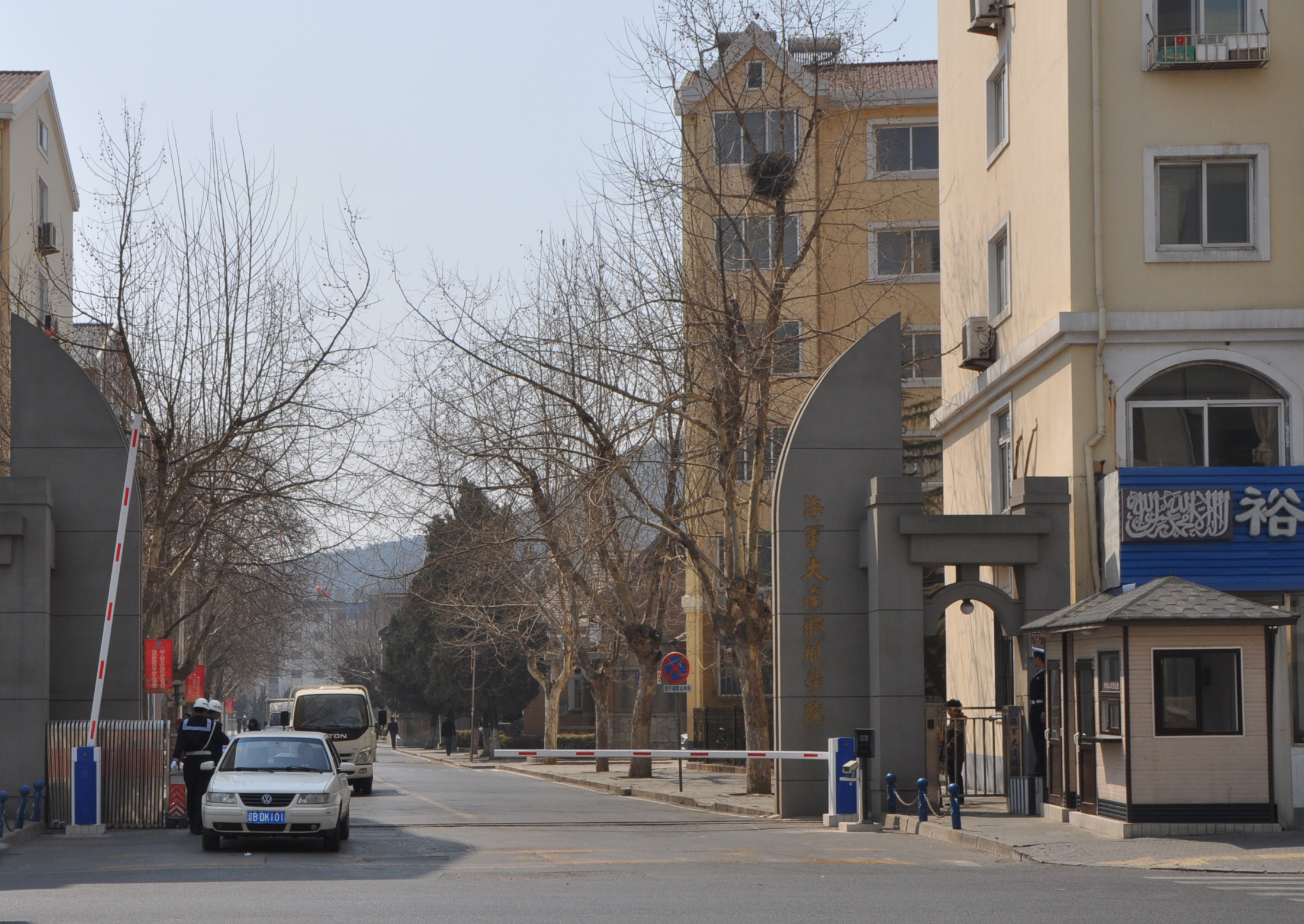
Dalian Naval Academy

Dalian Naval Academy (海军大连舰艇学院) is one of the higher education institutes of the Chinese People's Liberation Army Navy and is located in Dalian, Liaoning.

It was established in 1949 as the first naval academy of the Chinese People's Liberation Army and was changed to the current name in 1986.

Its address is 667, Jiefang Road, Zhongshan District, Dalian, and is just north of Laohutan (老虎滩), a popular resort place that houses the Dalian Laohutan Ocean Park.

Zhang Zhannan, Wu Shengli, Dong Jun, Shen Jinlong, Jiang Guoping and Li Yujie are some prominent names of the PLA navy who had served as the former head of the academy.

== See also ==
- Academic institutions of the armed forces of China
- Chinese People's Liberation Army Navy
