= Balme (surname) =

Balme is a surname. Notable people with the surname include:

- Augustin de La Balme (1733–1780), French cavalry officer
- David Mowbray Balme (1912–1989), British-born educator in Ghana
- Eugène Balme (1874–1914), French participant in 1910 and 1914 Summer Olympics (shooter)
- Gerry Balme (1885–c. 1960), Australian football player, WWI medal recipient
- Harold Balme (1878–1953), British medical missionary to China
- Henry Balme (1367–1439), Geneva-born Franciscan theologian
- John Balme (b. 1946), American musician and opera manager
- Neil Balme (b. 1952), Australian football player
- Tim Balme (b. 1967), New Zealand actor and screenwriter

== See also ==
- Balme (disambiguation)
