= Qilu Hospital =

Qilu Hospital 齐鲁医院

Geography
- Location: No. 107, Wenhua West Road, Lixia District, Jinan City, Shandong Province, People's Republic of China

Organisation
- Affiliated university: Qilu Medical College, Shandong University

Services
- Standards: Grade A tertiary hospital

History
- Founded: 1890; 136 years ago

Links
- Website: www.qiluhospital.cn/en/

Qilu Hospital, or Cheeloo Hospital, is a comprehensive Grade A tertiary hospital in Jinan City, Shandong Province, China. It is affiliated to Shandong University and directly managed by the National Health Commission. Founded in 1890, Qilu Hospital was one of the four major Christian Church-affiliated hospitals in China, and now a large hospital with 4,360 beds.

== History ==
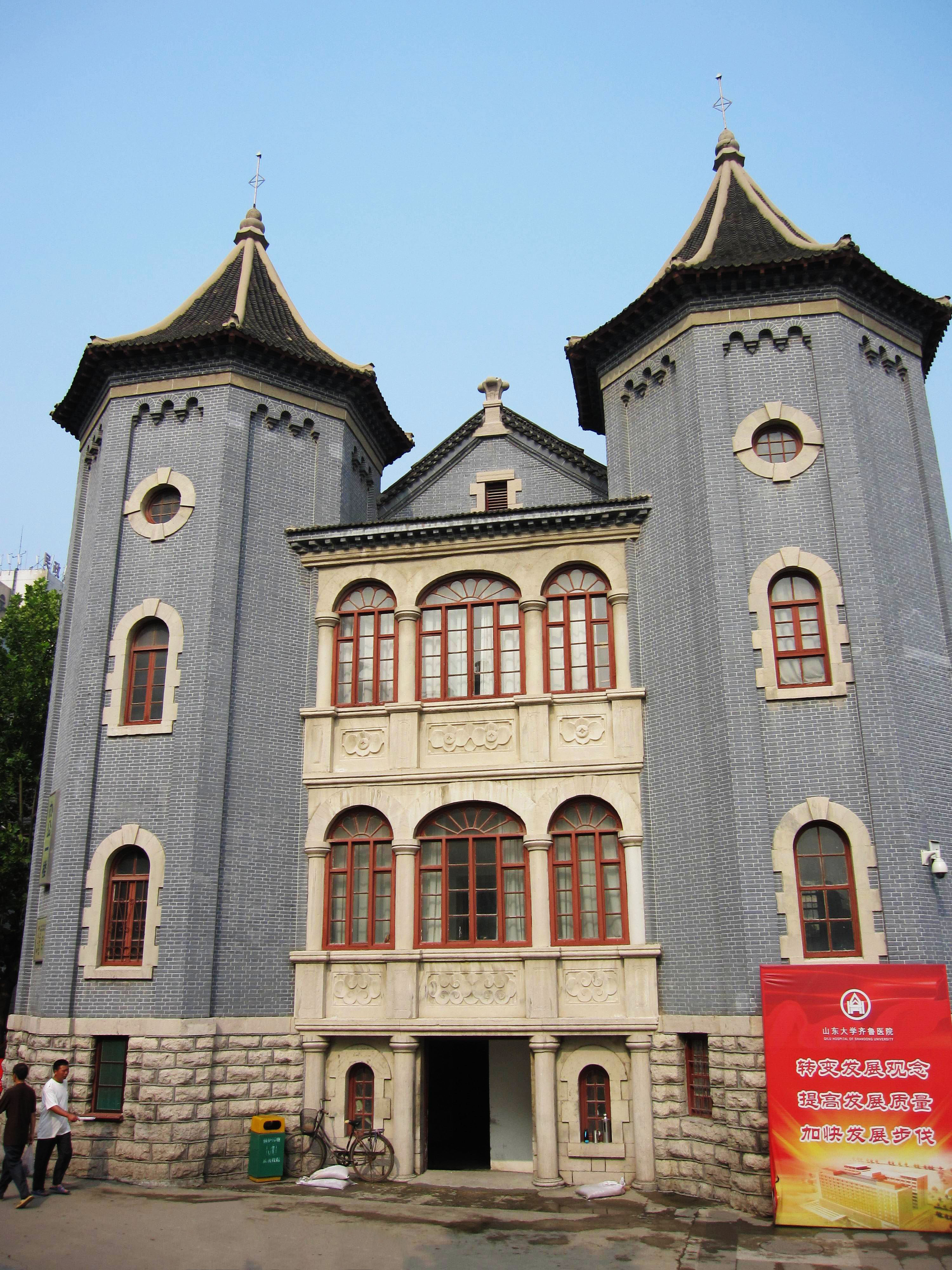
The "Republican Building" of Qilu Hospital was built in 1914 and inaugurated by military governor Jin Yunpeng.

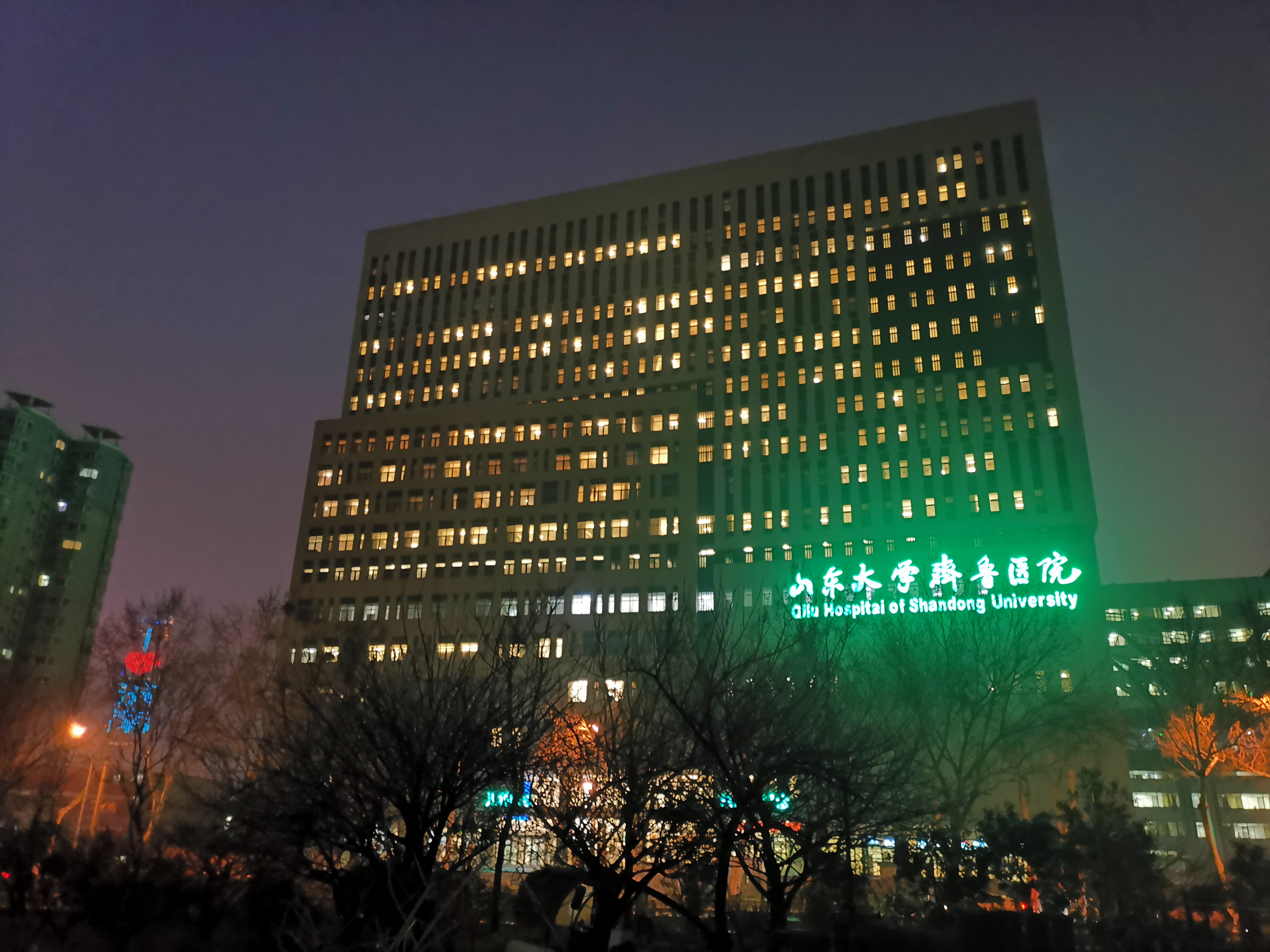
Present day Qilu Hospital inside the Baotuquan Campus

In 1890, the "Sino-US Hospital" was founded by expansion of the Dongguan Mission Clinic in Jinan. It was funded by Chinese donations and built by Americans.

In 1908, the Sino-US Hospital was renamed "Jinan Union Hospital".

In 1917, based on the Jinan Union Hospital, the "Qilu Hospital" of Cheeloo University was established.

In the 1930s, Qilu Hospital was one of the four major Christian Church-affiliated hospitals in China, according to the saying of " Peking Union Hospital [is the top] in the North [China], Xiangya Hospital in the South, Qilu Hospital in the East, and West China Hospital in the West".

In 1957, Qilu Hospital was renamed the "Affiliated Hospital of Shandong Medical College".

In May 1985, it was renamed the "Affiliated Hospital of Shandong Medical University".

In October 2000, the hospital was renamed "Qilu Hospital" of Shandong University.

In 2024, Qilu Hospital became one of the 17 Chinese public hospitals with annual revenue exceeding ten billion yuan.

== Current status ==
Today, the Shandong University Qilu Hospital a large hospital 0f 4,360 beds, and treats more than 3 million outpatient treatments per year. It has 61 departments including cardiology, internal medicine, hematology, gynecology and obstetrics, otolaryngology, general surgery, neurosurgery, and pediatrics. The hospital is located at 107 Wenhua West Road in Jinan.

In the year from 1 December 2024 to 30 November 2025, Cheeloo Hospital altogether published 139 research papers on Nature Index.

Qilu Hospital has three campuses in the two cities of Jinan and Qingdao with a total of 5,000 beds and nearly 10,000 employees. In addition, there is another branch hospital in Dezhou City.

Qilu Hospital is also a leader in organ transplantation in China.

== Honors ==
Qilu Hospital has won numerous national-level honors, including the Second Prize of the State Natural Science Award , the Ho Leung Ho Lee Foundation 2020 Science and Technology Innovation Award, the First Prize of the Chinese Medical Association Medical Science and Technology Award, and the 17th China Youth Science and Technology Award. And there are a larger number of first prizes at the provincial/ministerial level.

Qilu Hospital was once known for its treatment of acute paraquat poisoning. It used immunosuppressants such as cyclophosphamide to inhibit the immune system to prevent pulmonary fibrosis. Combined with glucocorticoids and hemodialysis to promote the excretion of toxins, it could improve the cure rate of different degrees of poisoning.

== Controversial Events ==
On May 4, 2025, a paper entitled “Clinical Application Effect of Targeted Nursing Intervention on Emotion and Quality of Life in the Perioperative Period of Uterine Fibroids” circulated online. The author was Huo Wenjing from the Department of Gynecology of Qilu Hospital of Shandong University. The paper was published in 2017. The article begins by stating that "uterine fibroids are one of the most common benign tumors in women," but then adds that "80 patients with uterine fibroids who underwent surgical treatment at our hospital from April 2015 to April 2016 were selected. In the control group, there were 27 males and 13 females, while in the observation group, there were 28 males and 12 females, aged 24-55 years."

The following day, Qilu Hospital of Shandong University launched an investigation into the matter and decided to give Huo Wenjing, a nurse at the hospital, a demerit and demotion, and to disqualify her from all promotions and advancements for five years.

On May 6, the editorial office of the China Medical Guide magazine issued an apology statement, stating that the editor involved had been dismissed and rectification measures had been formulated.

== See also ==
- Cheeloo College of Medicine
- Shandong University
