= Shandong First Medical University =

Medical school in Jinan, Shandong, China

- 山東第一醫科大學
- Type: Public
- Established: 1915; 111 years ago
- President: Lu Lin
- Location: Jinan, China
- Campus: Urban
- Affiliations: Shandong Provincial People's Government
- Website: english.sdfmu.edu.cn/index.htm

Chinese name
- Simplified Chinese: 山东第一医科大学
- Traditional Chinese: 山東第一醫科大學
Transcriptions
Standard Mandarin
- Hanyu Pinyin: Shāndōng Dìyī Yīkē Dàxué

The Shandong First Medical University (Shandong Academy of Medical Sciences) is a key university under the Shandong Provincial Government, with campuses in Jinan and Tai'an. Officially established on the basis of Taishan Medical College and Shandong Academy of Medical Sciences in 2019, the university is now a large education institution of 15,000 faculty members and has been selected as a "University Aiming to Join the Double First-Class Initiative" in Shandong Province's high-level university construction project.

== History ==
In 1915, the Shandong Provincial Medical Training Institute was established.

In 1932, the medical institute was developed into "Shandong Medical College".

In 1952, the medical college and the medical school of Cheeloo University (or Qilu University) were merged to form the new Shandong Medical College.

In 1970, Shandong Medical College moved from Jinan to Loude Town, Tai'an City.

In 1974, part of the college moved back to Jinan, while the other part became the Loude Branch of Shandong Medical College.

In 1979, the Loude Branch moved to Tai'an City and was renamed the "Tai'an Branch of Shandong Medical College".

In 1981, the school was renamed "Taishan Medical College".

In May 2017, the Shandong Provincial People's Government proposed to integrate Taishan Medical College, Shandong Academy of Medical Sciences, and Shandong Provincial Hospital into "Qilu Medical University" (Preparatory). However, this name was opposed by alumni of Qilu University, who argued that the "Qilu Medicine" brand belonged to Shandong University.

On February 28, 2019, Shandong First Medical University (Shandong Academy of Medical Sciences) was officially established on the basis of Taishan Medical College, Shandong Academy of Medical Sciences, Shandong Provincial Hospital and other resources, retaining the name of "Shandong Academy of Medical Sciences".

In 2020, Shandong First Medical University was listede among the "Striving for First-Class" universities by the Shandong Provinc.

In 2025, the First Clinical College of Shandong First Medical University was established.

== Schools and departments ==
The university has the following schools and departments:

- School of Ophthalmology
- School of Preventive Medicine Sciences & Institute of Radiation Medicine
- School of Pharmaceutical Sciences & Institute of Materia Medica
- School of Biomedical Sciences & Shandong Medicinal and Biotechnology Center
- School of Laboratory Animal & Shandong Laboratory Animal Center
- School of Health Care Security & Shandong Institute of Healthcare Security
- School of Clinical and Basic medicine & Institute of Basic Medicine
- School of Radiology
- School of Nursing
- School of Stomatology
- School of Sports Medicine and Rehabilitation
- School of Public Health
- School of Life Sciences
- School of Medical Information and Artificial Intelligence
- School of Chemistry and Pharmaceutical Engineering
- School of Marxism
- School of Medical Management
- School of Foreign Languages
- School of Continuing Education
- School of International Education
- Department of General Education

== Affiliated hospitals ==
The university has 12 directly affiliated hospitals, including:

- Shandong Academy of Occupational Health and Occupational Medicine
- Shandong Institute of Parasitic Diseases
- Shandong Provincial Hospital Affiliated to Shandong First Medical University (Shandong Provincial Hospital)
- The First Affiliated Hospital of Shandong First Medical University (Shandong Provincial Qianfoshan Hospital)
- The Second Affiliated Hospital of Shandong First Medical University
- The Third Affiliated Hospital of Shandong First Medical University (Affiliated Hospital of Shandong Academy of Medical Sciences)
- Cancer Hospital of Shandong First Medical University (Shandong Cancer Institute, Shandong Cancer Hospital)
- Qingdao Eye Hospital of Shandong First Medical University
- Dermatology Hospital of Shandong First Medical University
- Endocrine and Metabolic Diseases Hospital of Shandong First Medical University
- Neck-Shoulder and Lumbocrural Pain Hospital of Shandong Academy of Medical Sciences

In addition to the above-mentioned directly affiliated hospitals, there are several non-directly affiliated hospitals, including the Affiliated Central Hospital of Shandong First Medical University (Jinan Central Hospital).

More than 40 million outpatients are served annually by the affililiated hospitals of the university.

== Other ==
The university has more than 21,000 employees (including those of the affiliated hospitals). There are over 27,000 full-time students from home and abroad.

In research, the three disciplines of Clinical medicine, pharmacology and toxicology, and biology and biochemistry have entered the top 1% ESI (Essential Science Indicators). The hospital published 234 papers listed in Nature Index for the Time frame of 1 January 2025 - 31 December 2025, ranking 465th globally and 150th in China.

The Shandong First Medical University has been making steady progress on the Shanghai Ranking. It ranks 17 among the medical schools nation wide in 2026.

The main campus in Jinan covers a land area of 2,054 mu, with a total building area of 876,000 square meters.

== See also ==
- List of medical schools in China
- Cheeloo College of Medicine
- Shandong Second Medical University
