= Zhigang =

Zhigang may refer to:

== People ==
=== First name ===
- Zhigang He, Chinese-American neuroscientist
- Zhigang Suo (born 1963), Chinese professor

=== Middle name ===
- Frank Zhigang Wang, Chinese computer scientist

=== Surname ===
- Feng Zhigang (1969-2011), Chinese footballer
- Hu Zhigang (born 1944), Chinese football coach
- Jiang Zhigang (born 1960), Chinese politician
- Lin Zhigang (born 1970), Chinese former international table tennis player
- Sun Zhigang (born 1954), former Chinese politician
- Tian Zhigang (born 1956), Chinese immunologist
- Wang Zhigang (born 1957), Chinese politician
- Zhai Zhigang (born 1966), Chinese major general
- Zhang Zhigang (born 1964), Chinese engineer

== Others ==
- Sun Zhigang incident, death of a migrant worker in Guangzhou, Guangdong, China
- Yu Zhigang (disambiguation)
