= Bolme =

Bolme is a surname. Notable people with the surname include:

- Joanna Bolme (born 1968), American multi-instrumentalist and recording engineer
- Tomas Bolme (born 1945), Swedish actor

== See also ==
- Balme (surname), another surname
- Kurşunluk
