= Balme (disambiguation) =

Balme is a comune in the Province of Turin in the Italian region Piedmont.

Balme may also refer to:

- Balme (surname), a surname

== Places ==
- Cheignieu-la-Balme, commune in the Ain department in the French region Rhône-Alpes
- Col de Balme, a high mountain pass of the Alps on the border between Switzerland and France
- Couches de Balme, a geologic formation in France
- La Balme, commune in the Savoie department in the French region Rhône-Alpes
- La Balme-d'Épy, commune in the Jura department in the French region Franche-Comté
- La Balme-de-Sillingy, commune in the Haute-Savoie department in the French region Rhône-Alpes
- La Balme-de-Thuy, commune in the Haute-Savoie department in the French region Rhône-Alpes
- La Balme-les-Grottes, commune in the Isère department in the French region Rhône-Alpes
- Saint-Salvy-de-la-Balme, commune in the Tarn department in the French region Midi-Pyrénées
- Tête de Balme, mountain in the Mont Blanc Massif

== Other ==
- The Balme Library, the main library on the main campus of the University of Ghana
