= Feng Danyu =

Chinese general

- 冯丹宇

Deputy Commander of the People's Liberation Army Navy
- Incumbent
- Assumed office August 2017
- Commander: Shen Jinlong

Deputy Head of the Department of Equipment Development of the Central Military Commission
- In office July 2016 – August 2017

Director of Co-ordination and Planning Branch of the PLA General Equipment Department
- In office December 2014 – July 2017
- Preceded by: Wang Li (military officer)
- Succeeded by: Position abolished

Director of Military and Arms Equipment Branch of the PLA General Equipment Department
- In office December 2010 – December 2014
- Preceded by: Chen Zaifang
- Succeeded by: Wang Qingzong

Personal details
- Born: 1962 (age 63–64) Cao County, Anhui, China
- Party: Chinese Communist Party
- Relations: Feng Yuxiang (grandfather)
- Parent(s): Feng Hongda; Yu Huaxin
- Education: Dalian Naval Academy

Military service
- Allegiance: China
- Branch/service: People's Liberation Army Navy
- Rank: Vice Admiral

Feng Danyu (simplified Chinese: 冯丹宇; traditional Chinese: 馮丹宇; pinyin: Féng Dānyǔ; born 1962) is a vice admiral (zhongjiang) in the People's Liberation Army Navy (PLAN) of China. He has been deputy commander of the People's Liberation Army Navy since August 2017, and formerly served as deputy head of the Department of Equipment Development of the Central Military Commission.

== Family ==
Feng's family was from Cao County (now Chaohu), Anhui, in 1962, to Feng Hongda (1930–1993), a rear admiral (shaojiang) in the People's Liberation Army Navy (PLAN) and deputy commander of the North Sea Fleet, and Yu Huaxin (余华心; 余華心), a writer and daughter of politician Yu Xinqing. His grandfather, Feng Yuxiang (1882–1948), was a warlord who led the Guominjun faction during the Republican era. He has a sister, Feng Danlong (冯丹龙; 馮丹龍), director of China Affairs Department of Pfizer. He attained the rank of rear admiral (shaojiang) in July 2005, and was promoted to the rank of vice admiral (zhongjiang) in June 2019.

== Career ==
After graduating from Dalian Naval Academy, he was assigned to the North Sea Fleet, he worked there until 1990, while he was transferred to the National Defence Scientific Industry Council in Beijing. Beginning in 2003, he served in several posts in the PLA General Equipment Department, including chief, deputy director, and director. Feng attained the rank of rear admiral (shaojiang) in July 2005. In December 2014 he was appointed director of the Co-ordination and Planning Branch of the PLA General Equipment Department, he remained in that position until July 2016, when he was promoted to deputy head of the Department of Equipment Development of the Central Military Commission. In August 2017 he was appointed deputy commander of the People's Liberation Army Navy.

Military offices
Preceded by Chen Zaifang	Director of Military and Arms Equipment Branch of the PLA General Equipment Department; 2010-2014	Succeeded by Wang Qingzong (王庆宗)
Preceded by Wang Li (military officer)	Director of Co-ordination and Planning Branch of the PLA General Equipment Department; 2014-2017	Succeeded by Position abolished
