= Feng Hongda =

- 冯洪达

President of Dalian Naval Academy
- In office August 1985 – January 1990
- Succeeded by: Jiang Kexu

Personal details
- Born: 19 October 1930 Tianjin County, Hebei, China
- Died: 19 July 1993 (aged 62) Dalian, Liaoning, China
- Party: Chinese Communist Party
- Spouse: Yu Huaxin
- Children: 2, including Feng Danyu
- Parent(s): Feng Yuxiang; Li Dequan
- Education: Saint Petersburg State University

Military service
- Allegiance: People's Republic of China
- Branch/service: People's Liberation Army Navy
- Years of service: 1953–1993
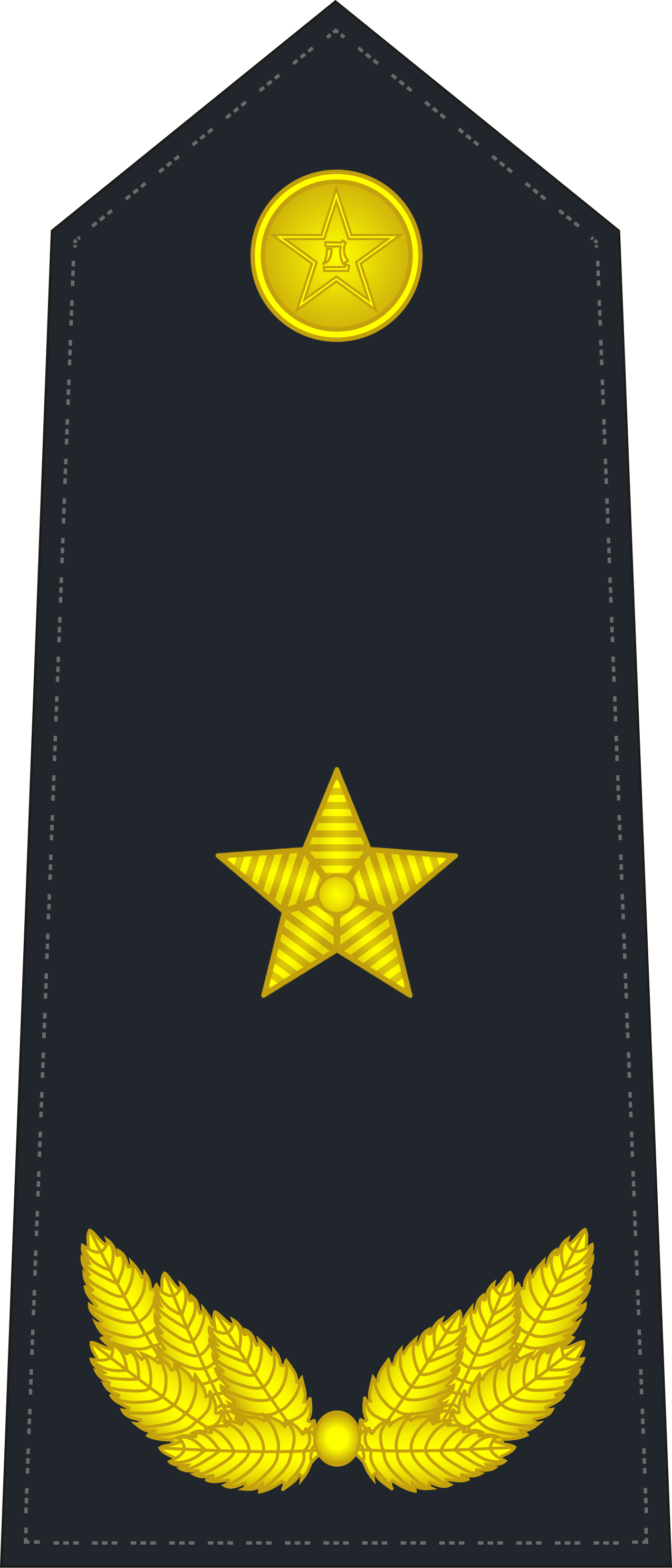
- Rank: Rear admiral

Chinese name
- Simplified Chinese: 冯洪达
- Traditional Chinese: 馮洪達
Transcriptions
Standard Mandarin
- Hanyu Pinyin: Féng Hóngdá

Feng Hongda (Chinese: 冯洪达; 19 October 1930 – 19 July 1993) was a rear admiral in the People's Liberation Army Navy of China who served as president of Dalian Naval Academy between 1985 and 1990. He was a member of the 8th National Committee of the Chinese People's Political Consultative Conference.

== Biography ==
Feng was born in Tianjin County (now Tianjin), Hebei, on 19 October 1930, while his ancestral home in Chao County, Anhui. His father Feng Yuxiang (1882–1948) was a warlord who led the Guominjun faction during the Republican era. His mother Li Dequan (1896–1972) was the first Minister of Health of China. He had three younger sisters.

In September 1948, Feng was sent to study at Leningrad State University (now Saint Petersburg State University) on government scholarships. Feng returned to China in 1953 and served in the East Sea Fleet (now Eastern Theater Command Navy). He was transferred to the North Sea Fleet (now Northern Theater Command Navy) in 1956.

In 1966, the Cultural Revolution broke out, Feng was removed from office and effectively sidelined, and was sent to a military farm in Lianyungang to raise ducks. He was reinstated as director of the Aviation Protection

Department at Yantai Naval Base in 1969. In 1982, he successively served as deputy director and director of the Navigation Assurance Department of the Command of the People's Liberation Army Navy. In 1983, he became vice president of Dalian Naval Academy, rising to president in August 1985. He attained the rank of rear admiral (shaojiang) in 1988. In January 1990, he was commissioned as deputy commander of the North Sea Fleet, and served until July 1993.

On 19 July 1993, Feng died of an illness in Dalian, Liaoning, at the age of 62.

== Family ==
Feng married Yu Huaxin, daughter of Yu Xinqing. Their son Feng Danyu (born 1962) is the current deputy commander of the People's Liberation Army Navy. Their daughter Feng Danlong (born 1959) is the current director of China Affairs Department of Pfizer.

Educational offices
Preceded by ?	President of Dalian Naval Academy; 1985–1990	Succeeded by Jiang Kexu
