= David Mowbray Balme =

British academic

Principal of the University College of the Gold Coast
- In office 1948 – June 1957
- Preceded by: First Principal
- Succeeded by: Raymond Henry Stoughton

Professor and Chairman of Classics
- In office 1965–?

Personal details
- Born: 8 September 1912 Carlisle
- Died: 23 February 1989 (aged 76)
- Spouse: Margaret
- Children: 5
- Parent: Harold Balme
- Education: University of Cambridge
- Alma mater: Clare College, Cambridge
- Profession: Academic
- Known for: First and only Principal of the University College of the Gold Coast

Military service
- Allegiance: United Kingdom
- Branch/service: Royal Air Force
- Years of service: 1940–1945
- Rank: Wing commander
- Awards: Distinguished Flying Cross; Distinguished Service Order

David Mowbray Balme (8 September 1912 – 23 February 1989) was a British expatriate professor and scholar who became the first principal of the University College of the Gold Coast which is now University of Ghana. The Balme Library was named after him.

A banquet was held in his honour at the Commonwealth Hall of the university on the eve of his departure from Ghana. He was presented with an emblem of the university, a crowing cock carved in ivory, by the University Council. He left Ghana the next day to take up his new position as Reader in classics at Queen Mary's College, University of London.

His father was Harold Balme, who was a British medical missionary to China, and served as president of Cheeloo University (Chinese: 齐鲁大学) from 1921 to 1927.

== Publication ==
- Aristotle; Gotthelf, Alan; Balme, David M. (Translator) (1 January 1991). Balme, David M. (ed.). Aristotle History of Animals : Books VII-X (Loeb Classical Library, No. 439). Harvard University Press. ISBN 9780674994836.
- Aristotle; Balme, D. M. (Translator); Gotthelf, Alan (Contributor) (24 December 1992). Aristotle's De partibus animalium I and, De generatione animalium I : (with passages from II. 1-3) (2nd ed.). New York: Clarendon Press. ISBN 978-0198751281.
- Aristotle (18 November 2002). Balme, David M.; Gettholf, Alan (prepared for publication) (eds.). Aristotle: 'Historia Animalium': Volume 1, Books I-X: Text (Cambridge Classical Texts and Commentaries, Series Number 38) (First ed.). Cambridge: Cambridge University Press. ISBN 978-0521480024.

== External source ==
- 207 SQUADRON ROYAL AIR FORCE HISTORY - DAVID MOWBRAY BALME By Allan Gotthelf
