= Eliza Ellen Leonard =

American medical missionary

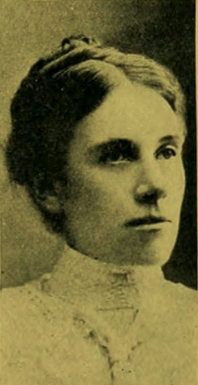
- Born: November 16, 1866; Kossuth County, Iowa, US
- Died: October 17, 1924 (aged 57); Beijing, China
- Occupations: Physician, medical missionary, medical school dean

Eliza Ellen Leonard (November 16, 1866 – October 17, 1924) was an American physician, Presbyterian medical missionary, and college dean. Based in Peking, she was Dean of the North China Union Medical College for Women from 1915 until just before her death in 1924.

== Early life ==
Eliza Ellen Leonard was born in Kossuth County, Iowa, and raised in Fairfield, Iowa, the daughter of William Patterson Leonard and Catherine Ashton Barr Leonard. She graduated from Parsons College in 1888, and earned a medical degree at the University of Michigan in 1895.

== Career ==
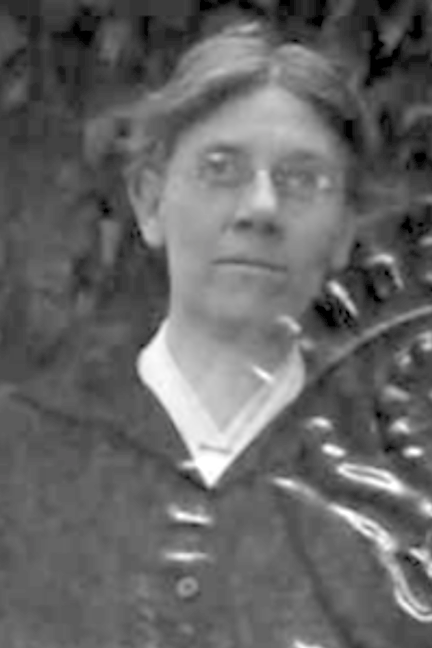
Eliza Ellen Leonard, from her 1918 U.S. passport application

Leonard taught school for a few years between college and medical school. In 1895, Leonard was commissioned as a medical missionary, and sent to the North China Mission, under the care of the Presbyterian Church in the U. S. A. Board of Foreign Missions. She was sponsored by the Women's Synodical Mission Society in Seattle. She survived the Boxer Rebellion violence in the city in 1900, though she was reported killed or "probably slain" in some American newspapers.

Leonard helped build and lead the Douw Hospital for Women, and the Union Training School for Nurses. "Nurses' work used to be looked upon as menial service by educated young women," she wrote in 1912, "but that day is fast going by." She became dean of the North China Union Medical College for Women when it was founded, and moved with the school to Jinan. She was vice-president of the Peking Missionary Association in 1922.

Leonard took furloughs home to the United States in 1902, 1912 and in 1918, and lectured on her work to women's groups and church groups. Sometimes she wore "a full Manchu dress" with headdress and shoes, when addressing American audiences. In 1919, she attended the annual meeting of the American Medical Association in Atlantic City, New Jersey.

Leonard resigned as the first Dean of Women in 1924 due to illness. She was the first Dean of what became Cheeloo University.

== Personal life ==
Leonard died in Peking in 1924, aged 57 years, after several years with cancer.
