= Republican Building (Jinan) =

Historic building in Jinan, Shandong Province, China

Coordinates: 36°39′24.05″N 117°0′40.85″E

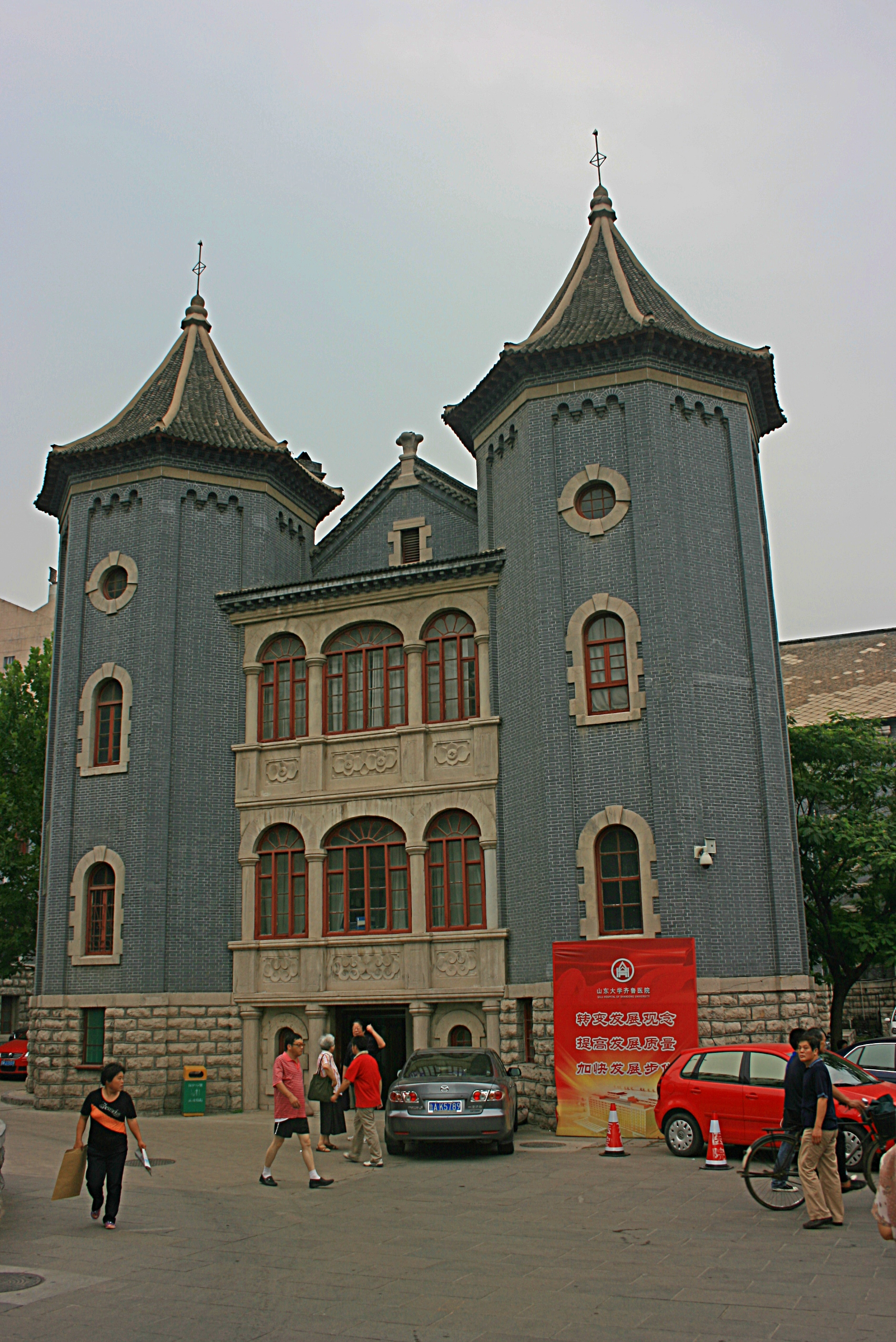
Republican Building in July 2009

The Republican Building (Chinese: 共和楼; pinyin: Gònghé Lóu) is a historical landmark building and a hospital from the early 20th century located at the Shandong University campus, in the city of Jinan, Shandong Province, China. The building was originally part of the hospital of Cheeloo University. Construction of the building was sponsored by the British Baptist Church. Work began in 1914 and was completed the following year. The building was officially inaugurated on September 27, 1915, by the military governor of Shandong, Jin Yunpeng (simplified Chinese: 靳云鹏; traditional Chinese: 靳雲鵬; pinyin: Jìn Yúnpéng).

== See also ==
- List of sites in Jinan
