= Paul D. Bergen =

American Presbyterian missionary to China

Paul David Bergen
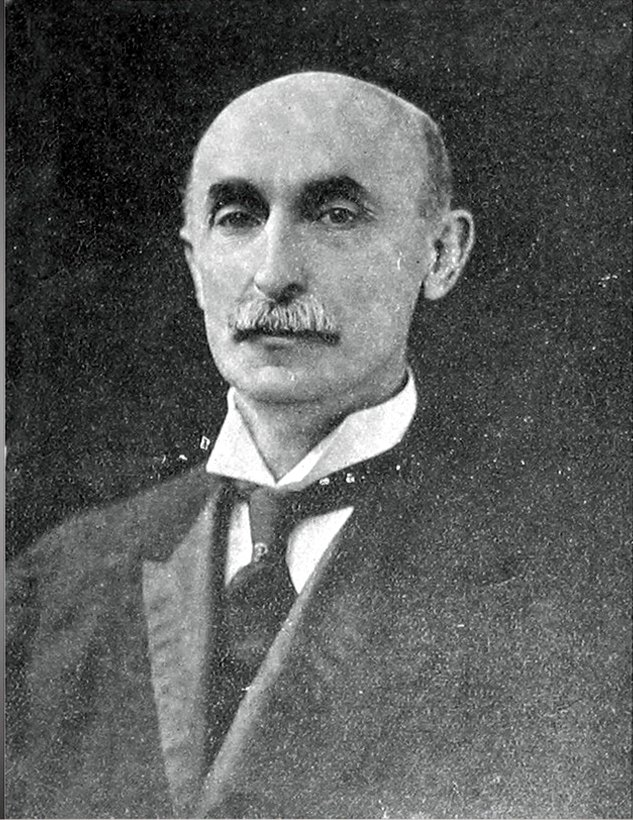
- Born: July 19, 1860; Bellefontaine, Ohio, USA
- Died: August 8, 1915 (aged 55); Unionville, Connecticut, USA
- Occupation: Missionary
- Years active: 1883 - 1913
- Known for: Missionary work in China
- Spouse: Mary Isabella McKinney

Paul David Bergen (Chinese: 柏尔根; pinyin: Bǎi Ěrgēn, July 19, 1860, Bellefontaine, Ohio, USA - August 8, 1915 Unionville, Connecticut, USA) was an American Presbyterian missionary to China in the late 19th and early 20th century.

Paul D. Bergen was the son of Rev. George Providence and Mary (Bentley) Bergen. He studied in Birmingham, Park College (Missouri), Parsons College (Iowa, 1876–79), Lake Forest College (Illinois, graduated 1880), Princeton Theological Seminary (New Jersey, 1880–1882), and McCormick Theological Seminary (Illinois, graduated 1883). He was licensed and ordained as an evangelist by the Presbytery of Iowa in the spring of 1882 and on August 18, 1883, respectively. From 1883 until 1891, he was stationed as a missionary in Jinan, Shandong, China. He returned to the US for the period from 1891 to 1894, first to Chicago (1891-1892) and then at Johns Hopkins University as a student (1893). In 1883 and 1884, he supplied the church at South Waukegan, Illinois. He returned to Shandong in 1894, staying in Chefoo (Yantai) from 1894 to 1898, in Qingdao from 1898 to 1901, and in Tengchow (Dengzhou, part of Penglai) from 1901 to 1902. From 1904 until 1913, he was president of the forerunners of Cheeloo University. After this, he returned to the USA where he lived on a farm near Unionville, Connecticut. He died of pernicious anemia in 1915 and was buried in the Greenwood Cemetery near Unionville.
