= Chen Qingji =

Chinese military officer

- 陈庆季

President of Dalian Naval Academy
- In office December 1992 – December 1994
- Preceded by: Jiang Kexu
- Succeeded by: Wu Shengli

Personal details
- Born: 6 December 1937 Jiangyin County, Jiangsu, China
- Died: 30 November 2023 (aged 85) Shanghai, China
- Party: Chinese Communist Party
- Education: PLA National Defence University

Military service
- Allegiance: People's Republic of China
- Branch/service: People's Liberation Army Navy
- Years of service: 1953–1998
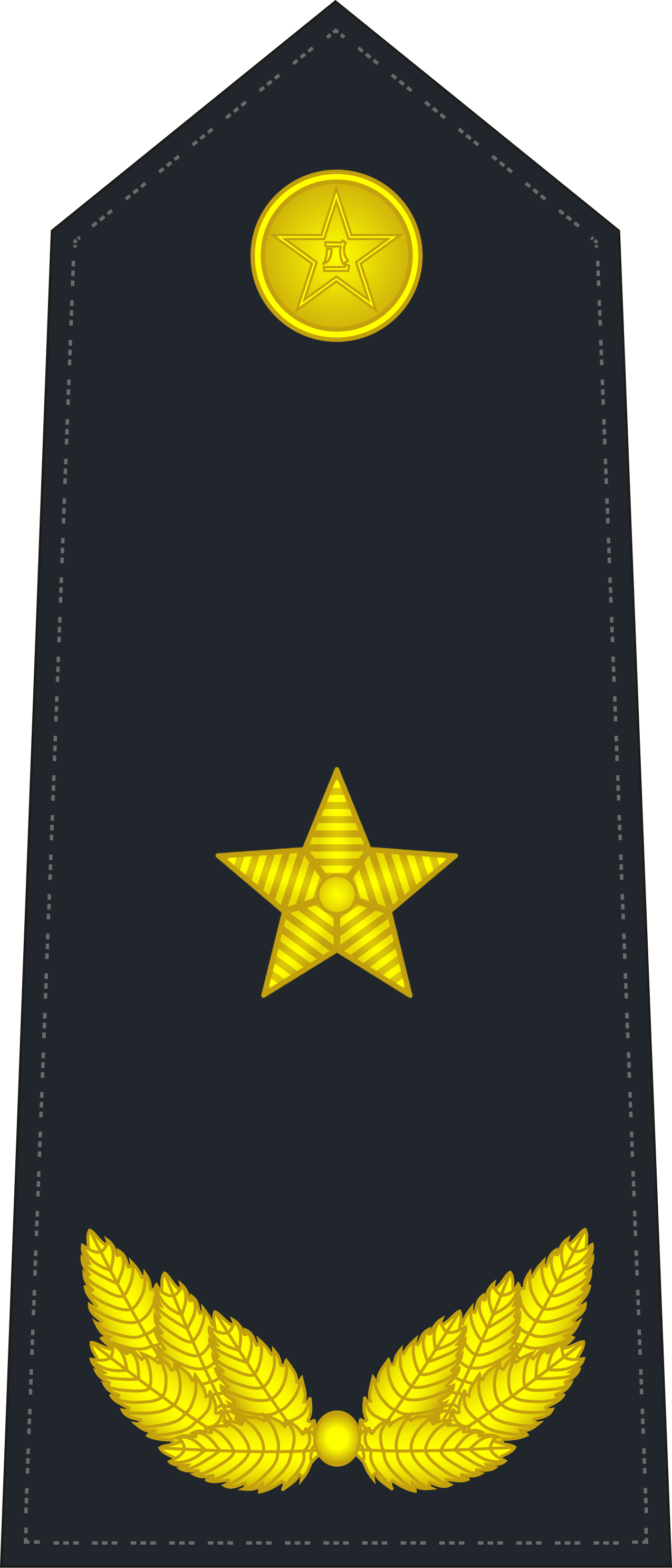
- Rank: Rear admiral

Chinese name
- Simplified Chinese: 陈庆季
- Traditional Chinese: 陳慶季
Transcriptions
Standard Mandarin
- Hanyu Pinyin: Chén Qìngjì

Chen Qingji (Chinese: 陈庆季; 6 December 1937 – 30 November 2023) was a rear admiral in the People's Liberation Army Navy of China who served as president of Dalian Naval Academy between 1992 and 1994.

== Biography ==
Chen was born in Jiangyin County (now Jiangyin), Jiangsu, on 6 December 1937. He attended Jiangyin Chenghan Primary School (江阴澄翰小学; now Chengjiang Central Primary School 澄江中心小学) and Jiangyin Nanjing Middle School (江阴南菁中学初中部学).

Chen enlisted in the People's Liberation Army Navy (PLAN) in 1953, and joined the Chinese Communist Party (CCP) in 1956. In 1958, he took command of a torpedo boat and took part in the naval engagement along the coast during the bombardment of Kinmen. In August 1985, he was appointed as chief of staff of the East Sea Fleet (now Eastern Theater Command Navy). In 1986, he enrolled in the first phase of the Department of National Defense Studies at the PLA National Defence University. He attained the rank of rear admiral (shaojiang) in 1988. In June 1990, he was given the position of commander of the Guangzhou Naval Base. In December 1992, he was named president of Dalian Naval Academy, succeeding Jiang Kexu. In December 1994, he was commissioned as deputy commander of the East Sea Fleet, serving in the post until his retirement in January 1998.

On 30 November 2023, Chen died in Shanghai, at the age of 84.

Educational offices
| Preceded by Jiang Kexu | President of Dalian Naval Academy; 1992–1994 | Succeeded by Wu Shengli |
