= Samuel Cochran =

American medical missionary

Samuel Cochran M.D.
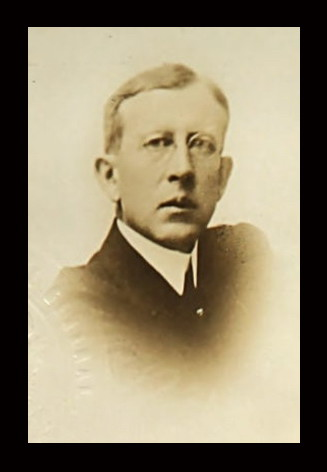
- Born: May 9, 1971; Mendham Township, New Jersey
- Died: December 26, 1952
- Citizenship: United States
- Education: Princeton University (BA) College of Physicians and Surgeons (MD)
- Occupations: Physician, missionary
- Board member of: Medical Association of China
- Spouse(s): Margaret Watts, (married 1899)

Samuel Cochran (May 9, 1871 – December 26, 1952) was an American medical missionary and philanthropist who worked for over twenty years in Eastern China. One of the "first half-dozen physicians in China," Cochran was the Station Chairman for the Huaiyuan Mission ("Hwai-Yuen" was the romanization of Huaiyuan in use at the time). Under his leadership, two hospitals were erected in Huaiyuan, with one specifically dedicated to local women. Cochran served as president of the Medical Association of China for two terms. Later, Cochran transitioned to academia, working for Cheeloo University (now part of Shandong University). and inspiring the merger between the university's medical program with Peking Women's Medical School to develop a teaching hospital. Cochran's long-term research, started at the mission and continued at the university, focused on treating visceral leishmaniasis, a parasitic disease endemic to China. Cochran would retire to the United States, continuing medical and academic work there until 1951.

== Early life and education ==
Cochran was born in Mendham Township, New Jersey to Israel Williams Cochran, a Presbyterian minister, and Annie Carter Cochran. Cochran's maternal grandfather was Robert Carter, a famous book publisher in New York and one of the founders and charter members of the Presbyterian Board of Foreign Missions. This is the organization through which Cochran would eventually become a medical missionary. Cochran's brother and fellow missionary, James Cochran would be born on December 27, 1874.

Cochran attended Princeton University, a member of "probably the largest Princeton family on record" as of 1926. While an undergraduate at Princeton, he would become the first ever president of the university's Cap and Gown Club and also served as the president of Murray Hall, Princeton's YMCA. Cochran would graduate fourth in the class of 1893, before attending and graduating third in his class from the College of Physicians and Surgeons, New York (now the Columbia University Vagelos College of Physicians and Surgeons).

Cochran later pursued an education in bacteriology and serology in 1914 at the Post Graduate Hospital (now New York University Grossman School of Medicine).

In May 1899, Cochran would marry Margaret Watts - just three months before leaving for China. Margaret Cochran would not only join her husband on the missionary trip to China, but she later proved to be popular lecturing about their missionary work.

== Missionary work ==
After he graduated from medical school in 1896, Cochran worked in the Sloane Maternity and NewYork-Presbyterian hospitals until 1899. Both of these hospitals were affiliated with the College of Physicians and Surgeons.

=== Journey ===
In August 1899, Cochran and his brother, James, would set sail for Nanjing with their wives. While they intended to spend time in Nanjing to learn the Chinese language and prepare for medical work, the Cochrans were uprooted by the Boxer Rebellion, which targeted foreigners. The Cochrans fled to Kobe, Japan, where 150 other missionaries took refuge. As the Boxer Rebellion diminished, the Cochrans would soon return to Nanjing, where they finished preparing for their own mission station located at Huaiyuan.

=== Huaiyuan ===
Despite leaving in October 1902, Cochran wouldn't arrive in Huaiyuan until two months later. A jam of boats along the Grand Canal and a contaminated water supply led to Cochran's nephew developing dysentery and dying. Receiving aid from the Presbyterian Church South mission, the Cochrans spent 24 days receiving medical attention, delaying their journey. Nonetheless, Cochran was one of the 8 missionaries present as the mission opened. Cochran was named the Station Chairman for Huaiyuan and was preemptively named the Superintendent of Hope Hospital.

Cochran's brother, James, was named the Boys' Boarding School Principal. The boarding school would house eighty students which targeted the "most influential families of the city," but loan libraries and reading rooms purportedly attracted many.

Cochran's first hospital, Hope Hospital, would not be completed until December 1909. Due to this lack of a central hospital, most missionaries between 1902 and 1909 were forced to rent houses from locals to live out of. One of these local houses was turned into the dispensary and operating room until the hospital was complete. The Huaiyuan mission station also provided numerous other out-stations across the region. An account of Cochran's situation stated that "he had a fine collections of instruments and he has had many major operations, but he needs rooms for consulting patients, and performing operations and a ward for his patients." Due to lack of resources, Cochran was forced to use fractional sterilization with steam, before Hope Hospital provided him with greater sterilization capabilities. Common conditions in the pre-hospital era were vesical calculus, entropion (which Cochran widely treated with a simple plastic operation), and opium poisoning (which was treated with a respiration set). Early successful cases resuscitating a patient with opium poisoning greatly increased the missionaries' reputation among the locals.

Excluding two year-long trips to the United States, where the Cochrans promoted missionary work, Cochran was stationed in Huaiyuan continuously. Huaiyuan's mission unveiled the Ming Kang Hospital for Women in 1919, the same year the Cochrans would leave Huaiyuan.

==== Hope Hospital ====
Hope Hospital opened in December 1909 as a gift from Mr. W. C. Lobenstine of New York. Once Hope Hospital opened, it was estimated to treat 6,000 patients each year. Of their patients, a large portion of the traumatic cases resulted from the nearby railway and engineer work. Medical workers at Hope Hospital were often tasked with treating cataracts and typhus fever. Other common conditions generally came from poor living conditions, such as malaria and abscesses. Finally, Cochran treated many cases of visceral leishmaniasis (also known as kala-azar), determining a way to increase the success rate of incredibly dangerous splenectomies. Cochran also determined a new way to diagnose visceral leishmaniasis by excising an inguinal lymph node.

The new hospital provided Cochran with the opportunity to conduct research, allowing him to engage in medical conferences throughout China. Most notably, Cochran presented a paper on eye diseases to the Peking Medical Conference in 1913. Additionally, Cochran made headlines in 1915 for his debate on anesthetics with J. L. Maxwell. Cochran's advocacy for the use of ether, despite the greater difficulty it posed for the doctor, asserted the importance of patient safety in doctor considerations.

Hope Hospital also functioned as a form of proselytization in the local communities. When patients are not being seen by Cochran. "his brother holds a religious service." Cochran acknowledged the power to convert, recounting an interaction he had with one local who was prejudiced against Christianity. Instead, Cochran said "that's all over now for his stay in the hospital has shown him some things about Christianity that might have taken him long time to learn in any other way."

==== Plague and famine work ====
In 1911, numerous provinces in Eastern China were inundated with the overflowing of nearby rivers, primarily the Yangtze and the Huai (which Huaiyuan is located near). The floods most severely affected the Anhui province where Huaiyuan is, with as many as 100,000 people having drowned. Due to the inundation of crops, many were forced into poverty as the food supply also decreased. In Anhui, as much as 70% of the rice crop was destroyed.

The Presbyterian Board of Foreign Missions estimated that 2,500,000 people were affected by the famine and that Huaiyuan sat as the pivot of this famine district. Cochran was directly responsible for 7,000 square miles of this, where two-thirds of all individuals were reported to have abandoned their homes in search of food. This resulted in more than thousands of homeless and hungry, resorting to eating things such as grass, straw, and tree bark. As such, much of famine relief was delegated to the Huaiyuan station. Cochran and other missionaries would distribute grains from railway terminals for three months, while over 1,000,000 people in Eastern China were enrolled to receive aid from missionaries. Even still, these grains were only expected to support 43,000 people for 20 days at a time. Cochran's hospital work would decrease as he routinely took multiple-day rides throughout Anhui province to monitor the grain distribution.

===== Plague response (1911–1912) =====
Compounding the flooding and famine striking Eastern China, Northeast China saw an outbreak of the plague in 1911. In Vladivostok, Russia, a fight between Russian soldiers and Chinese locals forced many Chinese to leave the famine-infected district of Northeast China and Russia, bringing themselves south towards Anhui. While the plague would never reach Huaiyuan, Cochran went to assist with medical efforts to treat the infected. However, interacting with infected individuals resulted in Cochran contracting typhus (a disease different from the plague), leaving him bedridden and seriously ill. Cochran would recover by the end of 1911.

In the Spring of 1912, "famine fever" (two separate diseases - typhus and relapsing fever) was still prevalent. As a result, Cochran set up and operated a special fever ward in buildings adjacent to Hope Hospital. They would treat 120 cases: 90 cases of relapsing fever and 30 of typhus.

===== Revolution of 1911 =====
At the end of 1911, China underwent another revolution. Many locals had become agitated by the lack of government support for the floods, famine, and plague. However, unlike the Boxer Rebellion, this revolution was not targeted at foreigners and missionaries - many of whom supported the poor in China during the famine and plague. Regardless, many women and children from the mission station were sent to Shanghai for fear that the railroad would be attacked, removing their mobility. Cochran stayed at the hospital to continue providing service at the hospital clinic, where he performed several operations daily.

Despite the missionary's confidence in their safety, several thousand people had converged on Huaiyuan, where "an attack, with inevitable looting and massacre, was imminent," according to Cochran. In reality, the attack was minimal as the locals had beaten off the attackers based on the strong reputation of the mission and hospital.

===== Plague response (1917–1918) =====
In 1917, the pneumonic plague still persisted in Northern China and Cochran was put in charge of organizing plague work in the region. Under his authority, an isolation hospital was established, and the Tientsin-Pukow Railway had passenger traffic suspended. For his work, Cochran would receive the Order of the Kia Ho from Hsu Shih-chang, President of China. Cochran would also receive a letter of recognition from the US Secretary of State.

==== Promoting missionaries in the US ====
In October 1907, Cochran left Huaiyuan for the first time, heading to the United States. The Cochrans would spend 1908 in New Jersey, giving addresses on their missionary work in China. Mrs. Cochran was responsible for speaking to the Women's Foreign Missionary Society chapters at various local Presbyterian Churches. Cochran also gave his own lectures to nearby Presbyterian Churches on Huaiyuan. The Cochrans would depart the US on New Year's Eve 1908, not returning to the US until 1914.

In March 1914, the Cochrans would return to New Jersey once again. As in 1908, both Cochran and Mrs. Cochran gave lectures on their missionary work at Missionary Society meetings of local churches. Additionally, Mrs. Cochran gave an address at the Young Women's Conference on China. The Cochrans's missionary organization, the Presbyterian Board of Foreign Missions, was heavily represented. Robert E. Speer, secretary of the organization, was also giving a speech. The Cochrans would return to Huaiyuan in December 1914.

=== Cheeloo University ===
==== Visceral leishmaniasis ====
Cochran began working for Cheeloo University on a short-time basis in 1918. While the rest of his family remained in Huaiyuan to continue their missionary work, Cochran spent his time in Jinan conducting research on visceral leishmaniasis, as well as teaching a laboratory diagnosis and bacteriology course. In 1921, Cochran would return in an official capacity, working as a clinical pathologist and continuing his research. Cochran saw success improving the effectiveness of antimony (a treatment for visceral leishmaniasis) available on the market from his lab in Jinan.

==== Cheeloo Medical School ====
Within his first year at Cheeloo Medical School, Cochran successfully proposed a partnership with Peking Women's Medical School (also known as the North China Union Medical College for Women) to form a coeducational teaching hospital. The merger was approved by the Burton Educational Commission in 1921. By 1923, Cheeloo University had built a dormitory for female students, and two classes of the Peking and Cheeloo Medical colleges were merged in 1924.

In 1922, Cochran would be named as the dean of Cheeloo University's Cheeloo Medical School. Additionally, Cochran acted as president of Cheeloo University for a year. Up until his departure, Cochran still engaged in missionary work despite his academic commitments. Cochran would be forced to leave Cheeloo University and return to the United States in 1926 due to poor health.

== Life after missionary work ==
=== Continued academic medicine career ===
Following his missionary work, Cochran transitioned to medical work and teaching in the United States. Even before joining Cheeloo University, Cochran took a short hiatus from China. Between 1919 and 1921, Cochran spent time teaching with Professor Hans Zinsser at the College of Physicians and Surgeons. Cochran was also charged with supervising an immunology lab at the college.

Following his resignation from Cheeloo University due to poor health, Cochran worked as a liaison officer for the New York Medical Center until 1949. From 1927 to 1932, Cochran would work as the medical director for the Lawrenceville School. Cochran returned to Columbia-Presbyterian Medical Center, working there from 1932 to 1947 as the director of medical information.

=== Personal life ===
Outside of hospitals, Cochran worked for the United Board for Christian Colleges in China. Through his position, Cochran was able to find hospital posts for many Chinese physicians and nurses coming to the US. He would retire from active work in 1951.

Cochran additionally joined multiple charitable organizations. He was a member of the St. Andrew's Society of New York, the oldest charitable institution in the state of New York. He also served as an elder of the Central Presbyterian Church in New York City. Cochran received an honorary degree from Princeton in 1927 - a doctorate of philanthropy.

== Legacy ==
Between the two hospitals at Huaiyuan and his role with the United Board for Christian Colleges in China, Cochran has touched the lives of many. In his book, Cochran notes that he would commonly receive letters from past patients who he helped.

Additionally, Cochran was actually at the forefront of implementing teaching hospitals and nursing schools. The early development of the practice of nursing in China came from missionary medicine and private foundations predominantly. Moreover, Peking Union Medical College, one of the medical departments combined to form Cheeloo University School of Medicine while Cochran was there, was one of the best nursing schools in China at the time.
