= Jiang Kexu =

- 姜可续

President of Dalian Naval Academy
- In office 1990–1992
- Preceded by: Feng Hongda
- Succeeded by: Chen Qingji

Personal details
- Born: 1934 (age 91–92) Qingdao, Shandong, China
- Party: Chinese Communist Party

Military service
- Allegiance: People's Republic of China
- Branch/service: People's Liberation Army Navy
- Years of service: ?–1993
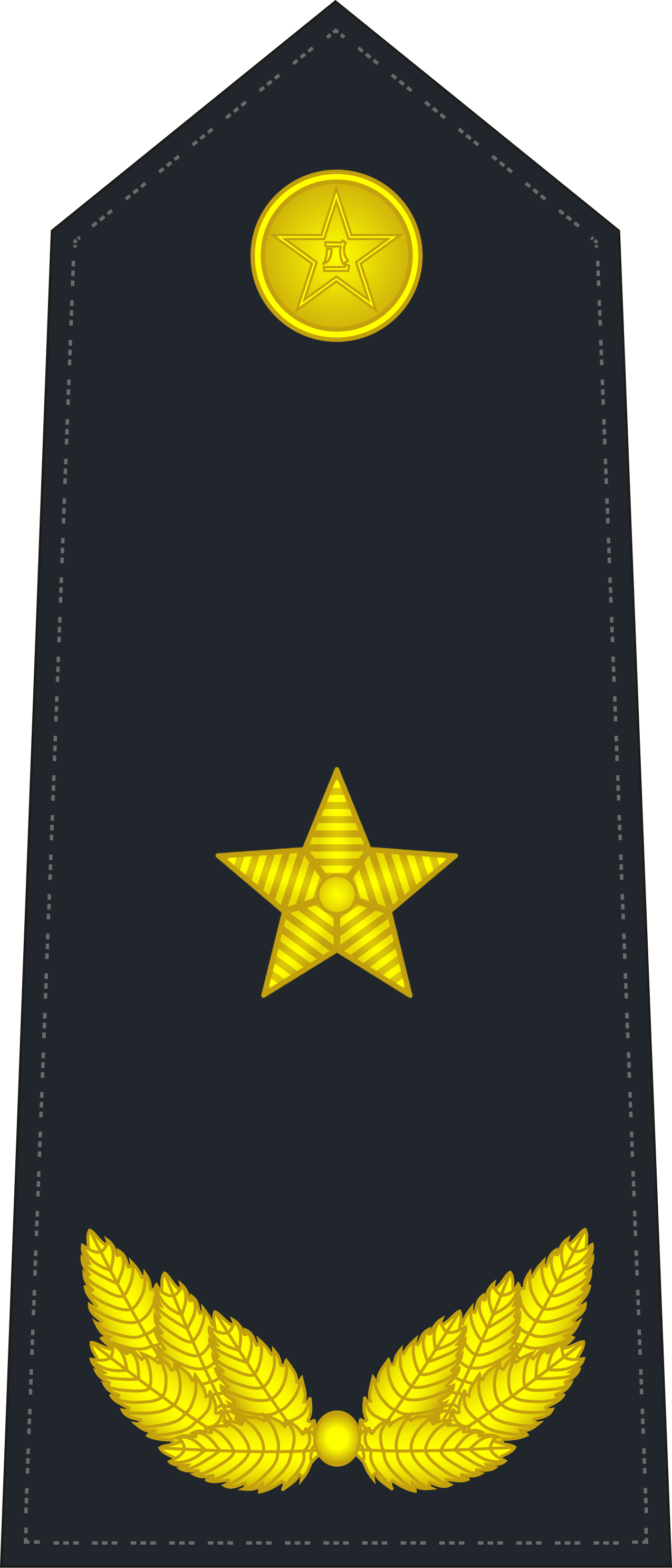
- Rank: Rear admiral

Chinese name
- Simplified Chinese: 姜可续
- Traditional Chinese: 姜可續
Transcriptions
Standard Mandarin
- Hanyu Pinyin: Jiāng Kěxù

Jiang Kexu (Chinese: 姜可续; born 1934) was a rear admiral in the People's Liberation Army Navy of China who served as president of Dalian Naval Academy between 1990 and 1992.

== Biography ==
Jiang was born in Qingdao, Shandong, in 1934.

On 25 October 1954, the North Sea Fleet's destroyer division, the first generation of the People's Liberation Army Navy's destroyer fleet, was established. He served on board the Anshan destroyer, and was promoted to commander in the 1970s. He attained the rank of rear admiral (shaojiang) in September 1988. In August 1985, he was commissioned as chief of staff of the North Sea Fleet (now Northern Theater Command Navy), and served until June 1990, when he was appointed president of Dalian Naval Academy. He retired in July 1993.

Military offices
Preceded by Yang Guodong	Commander of the Anshan destroyer 1970s–1970s	Succeeded by Wu Zhongkang
Educational offices
Preceded by Feng Hongda	President of Dalian Naval Academy; 1990–1992	Succeeded by Chen Qingji
