= Lan-Hua Liu =

Chinese educator

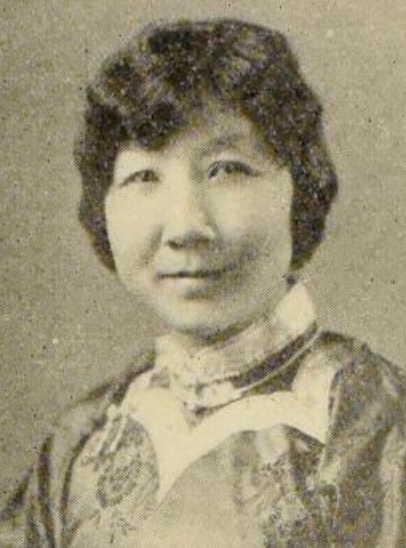
- Lan-Hua Liu, from a 1925 publication
- Born: May 30, 1894; Taigu, Shanxi Province, China
- Died: after 1947
- Other names: Lan Hua Liu Yui, Mrs. L. H. L. Yü, Lan Hwa Liu, Lew Lan Hua
- Occupations: Educator, college administrator
- Spouse: Yu Xinqing

Lan-Hua Liu (May 30, 1894 – after 1947) was a Chinese educator and college administrator. She was dean of women at Cheeloo University.

== Early life and education ==
Liu was born in Che Wang, Taigu, Shanxi Province. Her grandfather was Liu Fengzhi, a Christian convert and community leader. Her grandfather and mother were killed in the Boxer Rebellion, when Liu was a little girl. She attended Christian missionary schools in Shanxi and Peking (Beijing), and graduated from Yenching College in 1917. She graduated from Oberlin College in 1925. She earned a master's degree at Teachers College, Columbia University in 1926. In 1936 she took a summer course at Cornell University.

== Career ==
Liu was a girls' school principal in Shanxi, before and after her time at Oberlin. She spoke about her school's work at a missionary meeting in Ohio in 1922. She was responsible for handling the school's merger with a boys' school to create a co-educational school. In a 1929 letter, Luella Miner refers to Liu as "one of my college daughters", while they were working together in Shanxi. In 1936 and 1937, she toured in the United States and Canada, lecturing and raising funds for her work. She visited her friend Janette O. Ferris while in the United States.

In the 1930s Liu was dean of women at Cheeloo University, leading the school's women during significant wartime upheaval, when much of the school fled Tsinan (Jinan) for Chengtu (Chengdu). "We still retain our identity and our ideals, and are seeking to cultivate here a group who will be ready at the first opportunity to return to our real home and build up again the work which has been so sadly interrupted," she wrote in a March 1939 letter to American supporters. In the 1930s and 1940s, she was a treasurer and member of the National Committee of the YWCA of China.

Liu was in California in the mid-1940s, recovering her health, living at the Ming Quong Home in Los Gatos, and again giving lectures about her work.

== Publications ==
- "I Kao Shang Ti: The Story of a Girl, a Will and a Way" (after 1929, pamphlet)

== Personal life ==
Liu married military chaplain and educator Sing Ching Yui (Yu Xinqing) in 1928. They had a daughter, Hwa Hsin (Yu Huaxin). There is a collection of her correspondence in the Oberlin Shansi Memorial Association Records at Oberlin College.
