= Tian Zhigang =

Chinese immunologist

- 田志刚
- Born: 11 October 1956 (age 69); Ye County, Shandong, China
- Education: Shanxi Medical University; Shandong First Medical University; Norman Bethune Health Science Center of Jilin University
- Scientific career
- Fields: Immunology
- Workplaces: School of Life Sciences, University of Science and Technology of China

Chinese name
- Simplified Chinese: 田志刚
- Traditional Chinese: 田志剛
Transcriptions
Standard Mandarin
- Hanyu Pinyin: Tián Zhìgāng

Tian Zhigang (born 11 October 1956) is a Chinese immunologist who is a professor and doctoral supervisor at the School of Life Sciences, University of Science and Technology of China, chairman of Chinese Society for Immunology, and an academician of the Chinese Academy of Engineering.

== Biography ==
Tian was born in Ye County (now Laizhou), Shandong, on 11 October 1956. He received his Bachelor of Medicine degree from Shanxi Medical University in 1982, Master of Immunology from Shandong Academy of Medical Sciences (now Shandong First Medical University) in 1985, and Doctor of Immunology from Norman Bethune Health Science Center of Jilin University in 1989. In 1993, he became a researcher at the Institute of Cancer Research, National Institutes of Health.

He is now a professor and doctoral supervisor at the School of Life Sciences, University of Science and Technology of China, concurrently serving as chairman of Chinese Society for Immunology.

== Honours and awards ==
- 2008 State Natural Science Award (Second Class)
- 2012 State Science and Technology Progress Award (Second Class)
- 2015 Science and Technology Progress Award of the Ho Leung Ho Lee Foundation
- 27 November 2017 Member of the Chinese Academy of Engineering (CAE)
- 2020 State Natural Science Award (Second Class)
