= Yu Xinqing =

Chinese politician

- 余心清
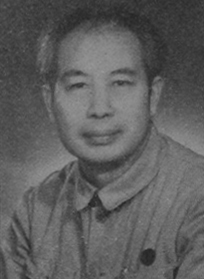

Member of the 3rd and 4th Standing Committee of the Revolutionary Committee of the Chinese Kuomintang
- In office 1956–1966

Member of the 1st, 2nd and 3rd National People's Congress
- In office 1954–1966
- Chairman: Li Jishen

Member of the 1st, 2nd, 3rd and 4th National Committee of the Chinese People's Political Consultative Conference
- In office 1949–1965

Vice-Chairman of the 1st, 2nd, 3rd and 4th Beijing Municipal Committee of the Chinese People's Political Consultative Conference
- In office 1949–1966
- Chairman: Liu Ren

Member of the 1st and 2rd Central Committee of the Revolutionary Committee of the Chinese Kuomintang
- In office 1948–1956
- Chairman: Li Jishen

Personal details
- Born: 1898 Hefei, Anhui, Qing Empire
- Died: 1966 (aged 67–68) Beijing, China
- Party: China Democratic League; Revolutionary Committee of the Chinese Kuomintang
- Spouse: Liu Lanhua
- Relations: Yu Wenrui; Yu Enhui; Yu Enci
- Children: Yu Huaxin
- Education: Nanking Theological Seminary; Columbia University
- Occupation: Clergy, politician

Yu Xinqing (Chinese: 余心清; pinyin: Yú Xīnqīng; 1898-4 September 1966) was a Chinese pastor and politician.

Born into a family of local government officials in Hefei, Anhui, Yu graduated from Nanking Theological Seminary as well as Columbia University. In his early years, he was a chaplain in the "Christian General" Feng Yuxiang's army. He was hailed as the "Red Priest" (红色牧师). Yu began his revolutionary career since 1933, he was once in exile in Japan, and he was once arrested and jailed. After the Chinese Communist Revolution, he served in various posts in government. In 1966, during the Cultural Revolution, Yu committed suicide during a series of humiliations.

== Biography ==
=== Early life and education ===
Yu was born in Hefei, Anhui, in 1898, to a powerful family. His grandfather was a general in the Huai Army. He had twelve siblings. Because of war and poverty, only he and three other siblings survived. In the autumn of 1915, Yu was accepted to the newly created Nanking Theological Seminary (金陵神学院) and graduated in 1919.

=== Pastor career ===
After graduation, he became a minister and pastor a church in Jiangxi. In the summer of 1922, the Henan YMCA (河南基督教青年会) hosted a summer camp in the capital city Kaifeng, they invited celebrities to give lectures. Yu made a stirring speech that attracted the Christian General Feng Yuxiang's attention. He was hired as Feng's chaplain. In the autumn of 1924, he pursued advanced studies at Columbia University in the United States.

=== Revolutionary career ===
When he returned to China he became president of Xunzheng College (训政学院) in Kaifeng, Henan and then president of Mingyi Meddle School (铭义中学) in Linfen, Shanxi, and later became director of the general affairs department of the Counter-Japanese Allies (抗日同盟军), serving as secretary-general of the warlord Feng Yuxiang.

In 1933, he took part in the Fujian Incident (福建事变), served as acting president of the Economic Committee of the People's Revolutionary Government (中华共和国人民政府). Chiang Kai-shek, the Generalissimo of the Republic of China, personally led his troops to crush the rebellion. The People's Revolutionary Government was routed and Yu went into exile in Japan.

In the summer of 1935, he returned to China and worked in the United Front of the Chinese Communist Party under the leadership of Zhou Enlai. After the fall of Shandong province, Yu served as a member of the Standing Committee of the Disaster Relief Committee of the Executive Yuan in Chongqing. He joined the China Democratic League in 1944. On September 26, 1947, he was arrested by the Nationalist government for participating the anti-government protesters in Beijing. Yu's wife, Liu Lanhua, an alumna of Yenching University, asked the former president John Leighton Stuart for help. Stuart said to Chiang Kai-shek, "This man must not be killed, he isn't a member of the Communist Party, killing him will cause discontent in many people." (这个人杀不得，他又不是共产党，你杀了他会引起许多人的不满) He was released in 1949. He had a brief stay in Hong Kong and then head for Beijing. In the same year, he attended the first plenary session of the Chinese People's Political Consultative Conference (CPPCC).

=== PRC era ===
After the establishment of the People's Republic of China, he served as deputy director of the Office of the Central People's Government, deputy secretary-general of the National People's Congress, deputy director of the State Ethnic Affairs Commission, member of the Standing Committee of the China Democratic League, and vice-chairman of the Beijing Municipal Committee of the Chinese People's Political Consultative Conference. During his time as director of Dianli Bureau (典礼局), he was responsible for the founding ceremony (开国典礼) of the etiquette arrangements.

==== Cultural Revolution ====
In 1966, Mao Zedong launched the Cultural Revolution, Yu wrote a letter to Prime Minister Zhou Enlai, he expressed doubts about the socialist mass movement. But soon Yu was denounced as a "monsters and freaks" (Chinese: 牛鬼蛇神; literally: evil people) by the Communist government. Like thousands of other intellectuals in China, he experienced mistreatment and suffered political persecution. The Red Guards paraded him through the streets and beat him in public. On 4 September 1966, Yu hanged himself because of unbearable psychological pressures. "Mr. Yu is a senior intellectual who follows our Party, he is uprightness and tenacity as well as honest and upright, 'a scholar prefers death to humiliation', how could he have had that kind of insult? If I was in Beijing, I will enlighten him, perhaps he will not go that way." (余老是一位跟着党走的高级知识分子，刚直不阿，为人正派。‘士可杀不可辱’，他哪能受得了那种侮辱呢？我那时要是在北京，开导开导他，他兴许就不会走这条路了。) said Xi Zhongxun, who had worked closely with him for years.

== Personal life ==
Yu married Liu Lanhua (刘兰华; 劉蘭華) in 1927, after they met in Columbia University. The couple had a daughter, Yu Huaxin (余华心; 余華心), who was married to Feng Hongda, son of Feng Yuxiang and a rear admiral (shaojiang) in the People's Liberation Army Navy (PLAN) and deputy commander of the North Sea Fleet.

== Work ==
- 在蒋牢中 [In Jiang's Prison] (in Chinese). Beijing: Historical Data Publishing House. 1981.
