= Cheeloo College of Medicine =

Medical school in Jinan, Shandong, China

- 齐鲁医学院
- Type: Public
- Established: 1903; 123 years ago
- Affiliations: Shandong University
- President: Yi Fang
- Location: Jinan, China
- Campus: Urban
- Website: www.qlyxb.sdu.edu.cn

Chinese name
- Simplified Chinese: 齐鲁医学院
- Traditional Chinese: 齊魯醫學院
Transcriptions
Standard Mandarin
- Hanyu Pinyin: Qílǔ Yīxuéyuàn

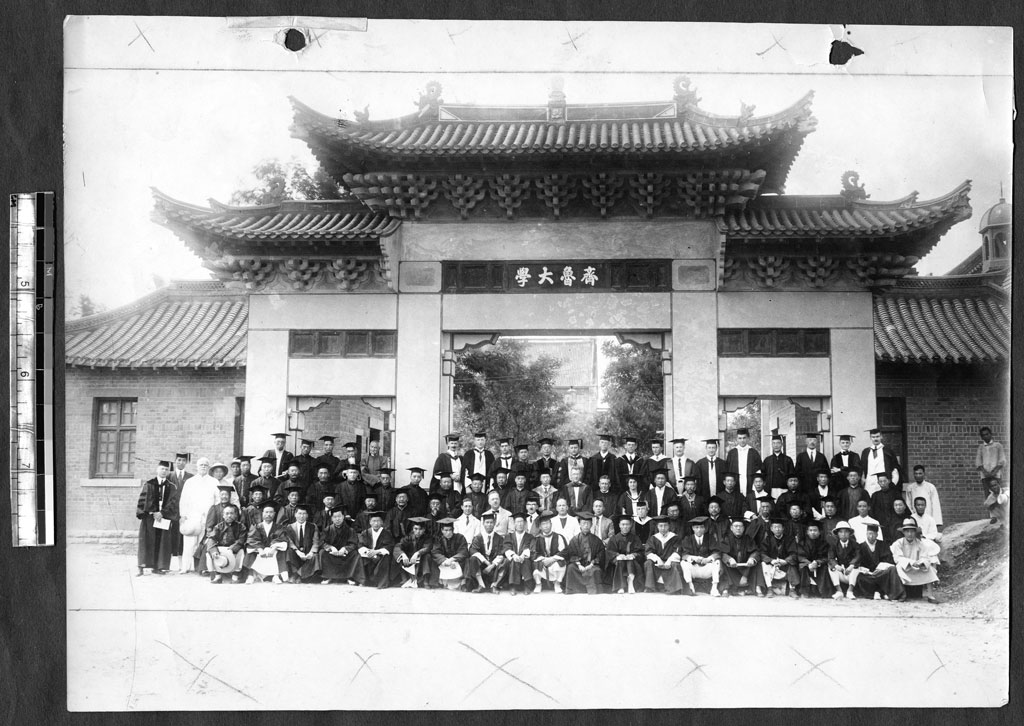
Cheeloo University in year 1924

Cheeloo College of Medicine, or Qilu Medical College, is the medical school of Shandong University in Jinan, China. Founded in 1903 with a history tracible to 1864, it was one of the earliest Western-style medical schools in China. Cheeloo College of Medicine is now a major medical institution in the country, having produced a total number of 45,000 medical professionals.

== History ==
In 1903, the Shantung Union Medical College was founded by the American and British churches (Its history can be traced back to the Wenhui Hall founded in Dengzhou, Shandong in 1864). It was the earliest Western-style medical college in Shandong Province, and one of the four major medical schools run by the Christian Church in China at that time.

On April 17, 1911, the medical college officially settled in Jinan, becoming the Medical School of Shantung Christian University with a grand celebration. This day was later designated as the founding anniversary of the Cheeloo University Medical College.

In 1917, Shantung Christian University was renamed Cheeloo University. And the medical school was renamed Cheeloo University Medical School, with a seven-year program.

In 1924, Cheeloo University graduates received diplomas and degrees recognized by the Canadian government. In the same year, a school Gate was erected, which can still be found at the campus of the present day Cheeloo College.

In the 1930s, the medical school was the strongest in the university, earning the reputation of "Peking Union Medical College Hospital [is the top] in the North [China], Xiangya Hospital in the South, Cheeloo Hospital in the East, and West China Hospital in the West".

In 1952, Cheeloo University Medical College merged into Shandong Medical College.

In 1985, Shandong Medical College was renamed Shandong Medical University. In 1997, it became jointly administered by the Ministry of Health and the Shandong Provincial Government.

In 2000, Shandong University, Shandong Medical University, and Shandong University of Technology merged to form the new Shandong University. Shandong Medical University was then split into five independent medical schools: the School of Medicine, the School of Public Health, the School of Stomatology, the School of Pharmacy, and the School of Nursing. The original site of Shandong Medical University (No. 44, Wenhua West Road, Jinan) was renamed the "West Campus of Shandong University".

In May 2012, Shandong University integrated the five schools (School of Medicine, School of Public Health, School of Stomatology, School of Pharmacy, and School of Nursing) and four affiliated hospitals (Qilu Hospital of Shandong University, Second Hospital of Shandong University, Stomatological Hospital of Shandong University, and Affiliated Reproductive Hospital of Shandong University) to establish the "Cheeloo Medical Center".

On September 18, 2017, the Medical Center was officially renamed "Cheeloo College of Medicine, Shandong University". In December, nearly 1000 students, teachers, government officials, alumni and representatives from other colleges and universities celebrated the 100th anniversary of Cheeloo Medical College.

== Affiliated Schools ==
The Cheeloo College of Medicine comprises nine schools:

- the School of Basic Medical Sciences,
- the School of Public Health,
- the School of Stomatology,
- the School of Nursing and Rehabilitation,
- the School of Pharmacy,
- the First Clinical School,
- the Second Clinical School,
- the School of Biomedical Engineering, and
- the School (or "Institute") of Psychiatry and Mental Health.

In addition, Cheeloo College of Medicine has internship cooperation with world top medical institutions including the Karolinska Institutet.

== Affiliated Hospitals ==
- Cheeloo Hospital of Shandong University
- Cheeloo Second Hospital of Shandong University,
- Cheeloo Third Hospital of Shandong University,
- Stomatological Hospital of Shandong University,
- Reproductive Hospital of Shandong University,

as well as several non-directly affiliated hospitals, undertaking the functions of teaching, scientific research and serving the community.

== Research achievements ==
In the year from 1 December 2024 to 30 November 2025, Cheeloo Medical College all together published 206 research papers on Nature Index. In addition, they also won numerous awards, including

- the [year] 2018 Second Prize of the National Natural Science Award.
- the 2009 Second Prize of the National Science and Technology Progress Award.
- the 2005 Second Prize of the National Science and Technology Progress Award.

== See also ==
- List of medical schools in China
- Cheeloo University
- Shandong University
