= Gerry Balme =

Australian rules footballer

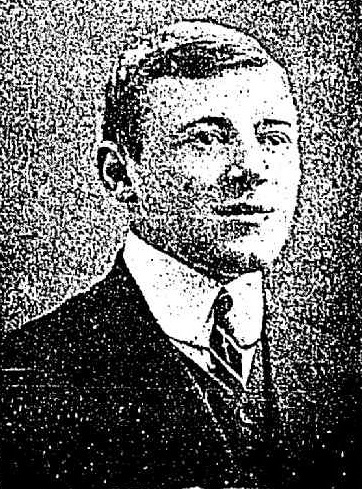
- Balme in 1905

Personal information
- Full name: Gerald Archibald Balme
- Born: 27 April 1885; St. Kilda, Victoria, Australia
- Died: 17 October 1955 (aged 70); Hillbrow, Johannesburg, South Africa
- Original team: Brighton Grammar School
- Position: Defence

Playing career^{1}
Years	Club	Games (Goals)
1902–06, 1915	St Kilda	91 (2)
- ^{1} Playing statistics correct to the end of 1915.

Gerald Archibald Balme (27 April 1885 – 17 October 1955) was an Australian rules footballer who played with St Kilda in the Victorian Football League (VFL).

== Biography ==
Gerald Archibald Balme was born on 27 April 1885 in St Kilda, Victoria. He attended Brighton Grammar School. He was recruited to join the St Kilda Football Club, playing from 1902 to 1906. He moved to Perth, Western Australia in 1906, where he served as captain of the West Perth Football Club (1907, 1910, 1911 and 1912). In 1915 he returned to Victoria, where he joined St Kilda for one season.

== Military service in World War I ==
Balme received schooling as an accountant. He married Ivy Matilda Howard. They were living in East Melbourne and he was working as an insurance inspector when he answered the call to enlist in the Australian Army (21 June 1916). He trained at Geelong with No.2 Battery, before being placed as sergeant with the 10/29th Battalion. He embarked for the front onboard HMAT Port Melbourne A16 on 21 October 1916, stopping at Devonport, before proceeding to England. By April 1917, he was in training as an acting sergeant and a Qualified Expert in bomb throwing at the S.C. Bombing School at Lyndhurst. He was transferred to the 70th Battalion from the 29th, initially as a staff sergeant, but on his own request, reverting to private. He remained in the 70th Battalion from 31 July to 1 August 1917, when he was transferred to the 69th Battalion. His battalion was dispatched to France in October and they fought in France and Belgium.

On 18 March 1918, Balme was wounded in action and was admitted to hospital with gas poisoning. He was sent to England on the Pieter de Cornich on 26 March and was transferred to the County of Middlesex Hospital, Napsbury. On 5 April he was transferred to the Australian Auxiliary Hospital at Deptford.

After release from hospital, Balme was attached to the 48th Army Course at the Senior Officers School in Aldershot. He remained there until returned to Australia on the Port Melbourne, embarking on 5 July 1919. They arrived at Melbourne on 20 August 1919, after which he resumed his residence in East Melbourne and his occupation as Insurance Inspector. His rank at the time of discharge was Staff Sergeant.

By 1924 he and Ivy had moved to Carramer Avenue in Camberwell, Victoria, and he had advanced to Insurance Manager. In the 1930s they moved to Johannesburg, South Africa and Gerry Balme died there in October 1955.

He is a great-uncle of Neil Balme.

== Military honors ==
Balme received the British War Medal and the Victory Medal with the 1914-15 Star attached.
