= The Balme Library =

Main library in the University of Ghana

Coordinates: 5°39′07.1″N 0°11′13.3″W

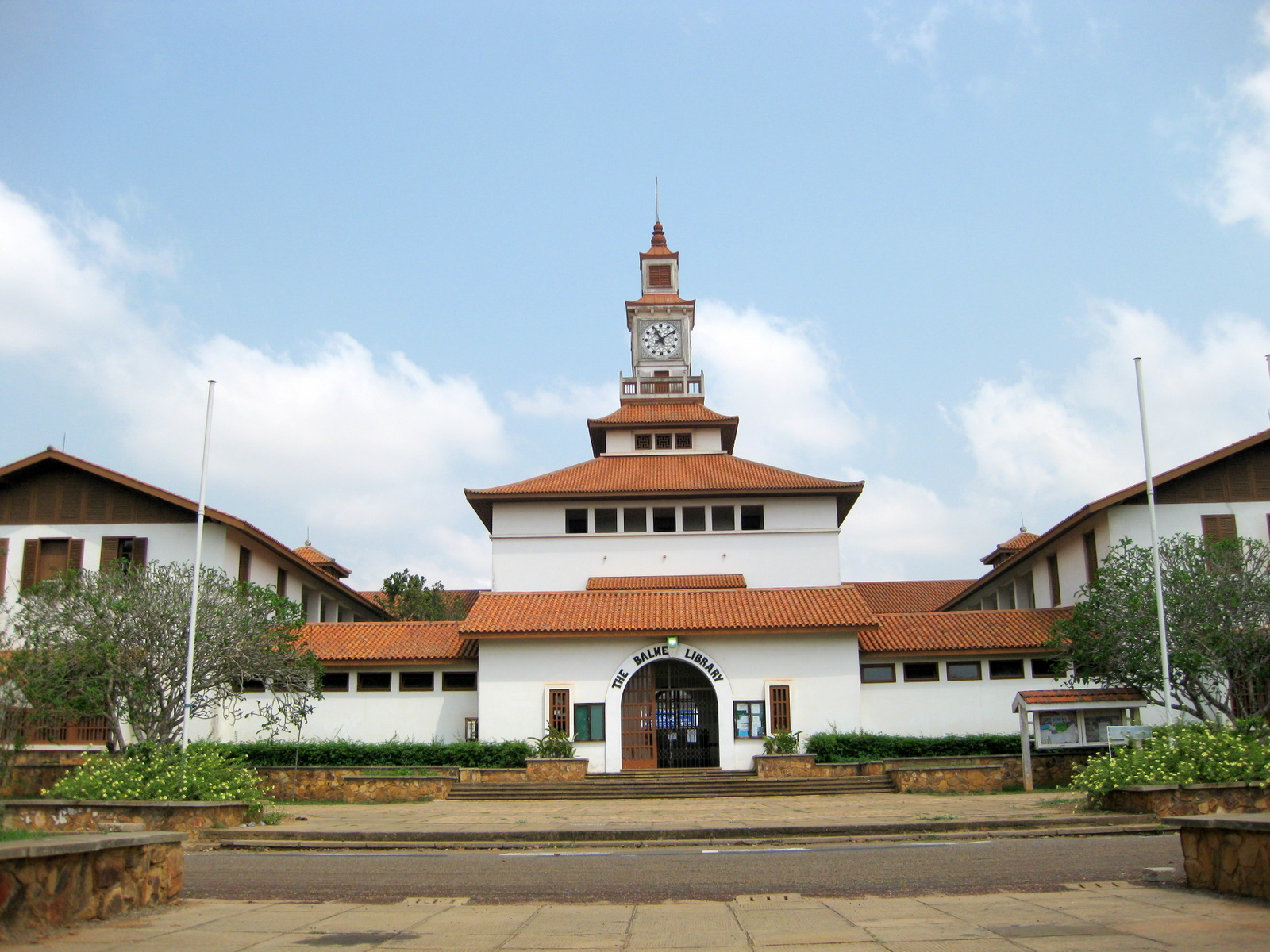
- Location: Ghana
- Established: 1948

Other information
- Website: balme.ug.edu.gh

The Balme Library, established in 1948 is located on the main campus of the University of Ghana. The Balme Library was named after David Mowbray Balme, the first Principal of the University of Ghana. The Balme Library is the main library of the University of Ghana and is also the largest within the University of Ghana Library System (UGLS). It is endowed with information resources, IT infrastructure and expert staff. Since its establishment in 1948, the library has gone through successive growth with its printed book collection totaling over 400,000 volumes. The library subscribes to an increasing number of online databases including electronic journals (e-journals) and electronic books (e-books).

The Balme Library together with the various satellite libraries in schools, institutes, faculties, departments and halls of residence of the university, form the University of Ghana Library System (UGLS).

== Membership ==
The primary clientele of the Balme Library includes the following:

- Faculty of the University of Ghana
- Students of the University of Ghana
- Researchers of the University of Ghana
- Administrators of the University of Ghana

The clientele may be grouped into two main categories:

1. Those who have the right to borrow from the collection. This category includes
  1. Senior members
  2. Graduate students and teaching assistants
  3. Undergraduate students and non-degree students
2. Those who can use the library for reference only:
  1. University workers (who have been recommended by their heads of departments to use the library)
  2. Alumni of the university
  3. National Service personnel
  4. Others, including students form other universities

== Main sections of the library ==
=== Ground floor ===
Library users/visitors are required to deposit their bags, coats, umbrellas, etc. in the lockers provided at the main entrance. The library is not responsible for the security of the contents of such items deposited in the lockers.

==== Reference Hall ====
The library's enquiry desk is located here with library staff, who will answer all your questions about the library and its resources. Books to be borrowed or returned are also done in the Reference Hall. There are also PCs exclusively for searching for books in the UGCat (the library's online catalogue). Reference books including Encyclopaedias, Dictionaries, and Almanacs are also kept in this area.

==== East Stack ====
Arts and Social Science books, (Call Nos. A-L), are kept in this area

==== West Stack ====
This area has study carrels and is mainly for reading

==== United Nations Depository Library (UNDL) ====
The Balme Library is a depository for most United Nations publications, including that of its specialized agencies. Publications deposited in the library are mainly for reference purposes.

==== Arabic Library ====
Arabic books are kept in the Arabic Library to satisfy the information needs of students offering Arabic from the Department of Modern Languages.

==== Mezzanine Floor ====
===== East Mezzanine (above East Stack) =====
Houses the Arts and Sciences collection. These cover Call Nos. M – V.

===== West Mezzanine (above West Stack) =====
Bound volumes of Arts and Social Science periodicals with Call Nos. A-P are located in this section.

=== First Floor ===
==== Periodicals Hall ====
Current periodicals are displayed in the Periodicals Hall. Previous issues are bound and kept in the West Mezzanine.

==== The Students' Reference Library (SRL) ====
The SRL is a collection of selected and current textbooks of all the subjects taught in the University of Ghana. As much as possible, multiple copies of such textbooks are housed in this library. These are for REFERENCE ONLY.

==== Africana Library ====
This is also for reference only. It specializes in books and periodicals on Africa. It also has its own reserve collection of books and other library materials. Books on Africa may be duplicated in the main stacks, and these may be borrowed.

==== Reserved Collections ====
The library has two reserved collections, SRL and Africana. The collections consist of books and photocopies of journal articles, which have been recommended by lecturers. Such materials are reserved on request because they are basic texts for the various courses. Materials in the Reserved Collection may be used only within the library. Readers need to consult the staff in the enclosures at the entrance of both the SRL and Africana to access materials in these collections.

== Departments in the Balme Library ==
There are five departments and one special library for students with special needs in the Balme Library.

These departments include:

- Acquisitions
- Cataloging
- Periodicals
- Reference
- Technical Services
- Braille Library

== Services, Resources & Facilities ==
=== Services ===
==== Binding of Books ====
The Technical Service Unit of the Balme Library (located on the Ground floor, West Wing Extension) provides bindery service to the university community and the general public. Students may send their long essays, project works, worn-out books, etc. to the bindery to be bound for a fee.

==== Photocopying ====
The library provides photocopying service that enables users to copy pages of library materials and personal documents. Charges are fairly cheap and neat work is always assured. Locate the unit in the Reference Hall.

==== Consultation of Thesis and Past Examination Questions ====
Masters and Doctoral theses as well as past university examination questions may be consulted online on the library's website (http://balme.ug.edu.gh/) or upon request for hard copies at the Reference Desk. An Identity card and, in some cases, introductory letters would be required before consultation of these documents.

==== User Education ====
User education in the library takes the form of the annual orientation programme organized for freshers at the start of the academic year. Subject librarians also organize periodic user education for their constituents.

==== Library Instruction ====
The library organizes workshops on the UGCat, electronic databases, reference management software and other resources. Such workshops will be advertised to allow those interested to register for them. In addition, training on any specific resource may be requested by contacting your Subject Librarian.

==== Off-Campus Access to Databases ====
Databases may be accessed off-campus by students after registering at http://ezproxy.ug.edu.gh/. Staff of the university are to use their staff email and password to access the service.

==== Online Chat ====
You may have a chat with a librarian online by accessing the "click to chat" on the library website.

==== Article Request ====
Access the article request service by clicking on "article request"

=== RESOURCES ===
==== Online Databases ====
The library provides access to electronic articles and books. Links to these databases are available at http://balme.ug.edu.gh/index.php/research-tools/databases-quick-a-z and on Subject Guides created by subject librarians.

==== Ebooks ====
In addition to books, the library also provides access to e-books in a variety of subject areas. Available at http://balme.ug.edu.gh/ are Myilibrary eBooks and Elsevier E-books.

==== Reference Management Software ====
Reference management software makes it easier for you to cite and reference materials that you use for your assignments, essays, project work, dissertation and thesis. The library provides access to both Mendeley and Endnote Reference Management Software. Kindly consult your Subject librarian for more information.

==== Theses collection ====
A copy of each thesis accepted by this university is kept in the Balme Library. All theses are catalogued and records of all UG theses may be searched from the UGCat (http://library.ug.edu.gh/ ) or full text accessed in UGSpace (http://ugspace. ug.edu.gh/ ). Hard copies of these can be consulted in the Theses Room.

==== UGSpace ====
UGSpace is UG's Institutional Repository where you can find in digitised form, some theses, links to peer reviewed articles written by members of the UG community, inaugural lectures etc. Access this resource at http://ugspace.ug.edu.gh/.

=== Facilities ===
==== Braille Library ====
The Soroptimists International Club of Accra donated the Braille Library to the university in 1989. It serves the visually handicapped students. Materials available include books in Braille and other equipment used by the students to facilitate their academic work. It is located on the West Wing Extension Ground Floor.

- Research Commons (RC). The Research Commons (RC) is a technology-equipped research environment, intended for exclusive use by faculty, graduate students and researchers. Locate the RC on the second floor, East Wing Extension in the Balme Library. Biometric registration is required before use of the facility is allowed.
- Knowledge Commons (KC). This is a Computer Laboratory for undergraduate students located at the East Wing of the Ground Floor. Computers and other facilities have been provided here to assist students in their studies.
- Digitization & IR Unit. The Digitization and IR unit is responsible for the preservation of library materials through digitization and electronic archiving. The Unit scans books, newspapers and other print materials of the Balme Library and publishes academic thesis and faculty publications on it UGspace website for free access and use.
- Faculty Research Commons (FRC). The Andrew Carnegie Faculty Research Commons is a reserved area for Faculty only. The FRC is equipped with computers and internet connectivity, scanner and printers for faculty research needs.
- Information Access Center (IAC). The lAC is on the second floor, West Wing Extension of the Balme Library. It consists of a training Lab, a computer lab and seminar rooms. The facilities are for the use of the university community, other educational institutions and the general public. A valid ID card is required to use the computer lab.
- 24-Hour Reading Room. The 24-Hour reading area is a dedicated space for University of Ghana students. The facility is equipped with wireless internet connectivity, tables and chairs ideal for reading and research. Users are allowed to bring their personal laptops for studies.
- West Stack Study Area. This study area replaces the section that used to house science bound journals. It is located on the West Ground Floor, adjacent to the Z room. It consists of reading carrels that promote individual study.

== Collections in the Balme Library ==
The Balme Library has special collection libraries namely;

=== United Nations Depository Library ===
- The United Nations depository library collects UN documents and publications through a special arrangement with the Dag Hammarskjöld Library. Since 1946, the Dag Hammarskjöld Library of the United Nations Secretariat in New York has arranged for the distribution of United Nations documents and publications to users around the world through its depository library system. The Balme Library is a depository for most United Nations publications, including that of its specialized agencies. Publications deposited in the library are mainly for reference purposes.

=== Arabic Library ===
- Arabic books are kept in the Arabic Library to meet the information needs of students reading Arabic languages, Modern Languages and Religious Studies.

=== Students' Reference Library ===
- The SRL is a collection of selected and current textbooks of all the subjects taught in the University of Ghana. As much as possible, multiple copies of such textbooks are housed in this library. These are for REFERENCE ONLY.

=== Africana Library ===
- The Africana Collection consists of materials from countries on the African continent. Some are in the native languages of these countries. In addition, there are original primary source materials, such as diaries, correspondence, official documents and field notes among others. The collection also includes books, pamphlets, maps and microforms. The subject scope includes art, economics, politics, culture, history, literature, music, religion, communications, management, cooking, among others. This library is for reference only. It specializes in books and periodicals on Africa. It also has its own reserve collection of books and other library materials. Books on Africa may be duplicated in the main stacks, and these may be borrowed.

== The University of Ghana Library System (UGLS) ==
The University of Ghana Library System comprises the main library (the Balme Library), satellite libraries, libraries in the Halls of Residence, libraries within Colleges, Schools, Institutes, Centres and Departments. The satellite and other libraries can be found on or off campus and are equally endowed with resources, facilities, and services. Specific libraries can be accessed online through the links on the Balme library home page.

== Satellite Libraries in the UGLS ==
=== The Accra City Campus (ACC) Library ===
The Accra City Campus Library was established in or around 1963 to serve the students of the then Accra Workers' College. The library evolved through the "External Degree Centre" period in the year 2000. The collection has increased from 5,000 to 20,000 volumes. The library is part of the University of Ghana Library System (UGLS), which is made up of the Balme Library, libraries in the various colleges, schools, institutes, departments and halls.

The library is in the Library Complex Building opposite the entrance to the car packing space for lecturers. The complex is shared with other departments and units like the Clinic, Security and lecture hall on the ground floor. The first floor is dedicated to ICT, the second floor is the Library Quite Reading Area on the left wing and Collaborative Area on the right wing and the third floor is the lecture hall. The Office of the Librarian and other library offices are located on the ground floor.

The library has facilities in-house and online which are very important and vital part for academic work on campus. The collection which consists of both electronic (www.balme.ug.edu.gh) and print resources provides essential background reading for the courses taught.

The library provides excellent facilities and products such as reference materials, textbooks, journal databases, Ghanaian Newspaper Index, study carrels, library instruction etc. Facilities include a quite reading area, collaborative area for group discussion, private photocopy services and an Internet wifi networked environment.

The library will be expanded with new services points such as Electronic Resource unit for staff and students on the ground floor, the extension of the quite reading area/zone to replace the collaborative area/zone and establishing the collaborative area on the third floor when the lecture hall block at the back of the library is completed. Library Management and Staff are committed to serving the ACC community.

The immediate past head of the library was Mr. Joseph Antah (2006-2016) and the current Head of Library is Mr. Samuel Bentil Aggrey (2016-).

==== Units within the Accra City Campus Library ====
The library has following units under it:

- Head of Library (Administration)
- Technical Unit (Catalogue, Processing, Procurement, Binding, ICT)
- Indexing Unit
- Reading Unit
- Students Reference Unit.

==== Policies ====
The library has library rules. Other policies are under review.

==== Collection ====
The collection of the library covers most of the courses on campus. The Library of Congress Classification Scheme is in use to classify and process books in the library. Currently the total volume of books stands at about 20,000.

=== School of Law Library ===
The University of Ghana School of Law (UGSOL) Library is the largest and most resourced law library in Ghana. We are key players in the delivery of legal education at the UGSOL. The study of Law is essentially a Library-based subject and students spend a great deal of time in the Law Library.

Key objectives:

- Identify the best legal research methodologies and sources that will help resolve legal issues or problems being researched into.
- Effectively deploy and use multiple research tools and techniques in a variety of formats for our patrons.
- Evaluate sources for their reliability, currency, precedential value, accuracy, cost and applicability to the issues being researched.

The University of Ghana School of Law (UGSOL) library has seen significant changes over the years both in terms of infrastructure and service delivery. In the last quarter of 2011, UGSOL moved to its new and current location. The new Law building is a state of the art facility which houses a modern library. The new library is open, serene and has more sitting capacity. The library with assistance from the United States Mission through its Democracy and Human Rights Fund has developed an Online Public Access Catalogue. In 2004, through a Carnegie Corporation grant to the University of Ghana for expanding ICT and supporting automation, the library re-catalogued and integrated its collection into the Balme Library database. The library's collection currently comprises over 34,000 volumes of book stock, including current, rare and heritage materials on Ghanaian law, a growing collection of Ghana government publications, law reports, textbooks and important legal journals. The Law library also provides access to electronic information resources on a range of law-related materials and subjects.

==== Core Collection ====
Statutes:

In building the collection of the Library, cognizance is taken of Article 11 of the Constitution, 1992 which states the Sources of Law and the hierarchy of norms such as the Constitution, Acts of Parliament, Orders, Rules, Rules and Regulations, the Existing Law (Acts, Decrees, Laws or Statutory Instruments existing before the 1992 Constitution), the Common Law, the Ghana Common Law, Doctrines of Equity, rules of customary law... etc. Additionally, the library regularly updates its stock of government publications including Acts, L.I.s, E.I.s, C.I.s, S.I.s, Gazettes, Regulatory Notices... etc.

Case Law:

This comprises Ghana Law Reports(1959-), Supreme Court of Ghana Law Reports (1996 -), English Reports (1220-1865), The Modern Law Reports (1865-AC, KB, QB, Ch, Fam, Ch, Ch.D, Ex.D., Fam. etc.); All E.R. (1936-to date, ) All E.R. Rep. (1558-1935); the WLR, the LTR and so many others covering over 25 different types of law reports. There are also Parliamentary Debates (Hansard) from 1966.

Other materials:

Monographs (textbooks), newspapers, law reviews, journals, reports, policy documents, law journals, law reviews and many others.

=== College Of Health Sciences Library ===
The College of Health Sciences library is part of the University of Ghana Library System (UGLS). It is located on the Korle bu campus, on the first floor of the Charles Easmon building. It caters for all the students and faculty of the College of Health Sciences. The library seats one hundred and twenty-eight (128) persons in the main reading area. There is a graduate commons that has a seating capacity of twenty-three (23).

==== Collection ====
The library consists of both print and online resources. It has a total collection of eleven thousand eight hundred and seventy-five (11, 875) volumes of print books. These books cut across all the health disciplines offered by the schools in the college. The print collection is made up of textbooks, some WHO publications, books on reserve and a reference collection made up of medical dictionaries, anatomy atlases and medical illustrations. In addition to the print books, the library benefits from online resources of both book and journal databases that the University of Ghana subscribes to. An alphabetical list of these resources can be found at http://balme.ug.edu.gh/index.php/researchtools/databases-quick-a-z and include health & biomedical databases.

=== University of Ghana Business School (UGBS) Library ===
The University of Ghana Business School (UGBS) Library is part of the University of Ghana Library System. The library operates from two locations. The K.E. Adjei Library which caters for the undergraduate students and is located on the main campus within the UGBS building. THE UGBS Tullow Ghana Library is the graduate library and is located in the Graduate Building of the school, off campus on the UPSA Road. The library seats 360 but has the capacity to increase seating. The library provides for relaxed seating area called the CAL Bank corner at the undergraduate library and the Tullow Corner at the graduate library. There are also 2 designated areas in the undergraduate library for use as discussion or seminar rooms for faculty and staff. The library units include the administration, acquisitions, cataloguing, circulation and reference.

==== Collection ====
The library's collection reflects the courses and programmes in the school to include accounting, finance, health services administration, human resource management, operations and management information systems, marketing and entrepreneurship and public administration. These resources can be found in print and online.

=== Institute of African Studies (IAS) Library ===
The IAS library serves fellows (faculty and researchers) and students of the institute. As part of the University of Ghana Library Systems (UGLS), the activity of the IAS

library is a reflection of what is done at the main library (Balme library) and so there is a lot of liaison activities between the centre and the IAS library to ensure that fellows

are students are aware of all the resources made available through the main library. The operations of the IAS library are governed by the UGLS policy with some local

disparities. The library has access and subscription to print resources and online/electronic resources which is accessible through (www.balme.ug.edu.gh).

The collections of the IAS library are basically special collections on Africa, its people and societies. These collections cuts across countries but more emphasis and efforts

are made to collect any material about and on Ghana. We have the newspaper project which constitute the indexing of newspapers from 2015 to present using

subjects and keywords as the search tern. The newspapers include Graphic, Times, Spectator, Chronicle and Mirror.

The collections are developed by acquiring relevant materials and textbooks based on recommendations by fellows. Again, fellows also contribute to the collection

by purchasing relevant materials from conferences and also giving copies of their book publications to enhance teaching, learning and research. The library has the

main reading room with a seating capacity of 72 and the graduate wing (for fellows, researchers and postgraduate students) with a seating capacity of 20.

The library has eight staff who are in charge of the daily operations of the library. The IAS library provides a siren environment for learning and research with Wi-Fi

network. The team members at the library are always ready and available to assist users within the opening days of the library.

=== Population and Social Sciences (PSS) Library ===
The PSSL is a reference library for the Institute of Statistical Social and Economic Research (ISSER) and Regional Institute for Population Studies (RIPS). The library was established in the beginning of the 1973/74 academic year, when ISSER and the Population Dynamics Programme (PDP) both of the University of Ghana, Legon, joined resources. Regional Institute for Population Studies (an institute jointly sponsored by United Nations and the Government), later merged its library stocks with that of the PSSL in 1975.

==== Sitting Capacity ====
The library has a sitting capacity of 80

==== The Collection ====
This is made up of the following:

1. Books

2. Bound Newspapers

3. United Nations Documents

4. Government Documents

5. Theses

6. Reprint Collection

»» Technical report

»» Ghana imprint

»» Individual African Country files arranged alphabetically, (Algeria-Zaire)

»» General file (countries outside Africa)

==== School of Public Health (SPH) Library ====
Even though the establishment of the School of Public Health (SPH) dates back to 1994, it took almost 15 years to properly set up the School of Public Health library and gradually raise it to its present status. It started with a small collection in 1994 and steadily grew into a full-fledged school library in the year 2010, after merging the previous library collections with those at the then Malaria Centre which is now the current location of the School of Public Health. The SPH-Library is a branch of the University of Ghana Library System (UGLS). As such, this library also benefits from the use of e-resources acquired by the Balme Library through the interconnectivity of the University of Ghana library system.

Although a small library, the SPH-Library is well-equipped to serve its numerous clienteles. For example, there is a Wi-Fi-facility in the library for easy connectivity to the internet by users. Additionally, the collection is current because efforts are made by the management of the Public Health School to ensure that the collection is up to date. Since most students of the school are health practitioners, some of whom are resident outside the Greater-Accra region, provision has been made for them to use the off-campus access for the use of the library resources anywhere outside campus at their own convenience.

Apart from students and faculty of SPH, the library is patronised by regular users from other departments on UG campus. The SPH-Library also provides services to students and faculty from other Universities and Public Health Institutions, members of Ghana College of Physicians and Surgeons, private medical practitioners and researchers who visit the library to use print books as well as e-resources. All these other categories of users are being attracted to the SPH-Library not only because the SPH at UG is the pioneer public health school to be established in Ghana but also due to the uniqueness of the library's collection. Some of the titles available in stock can be located under the following broad subject areas:

Encyclopaedias and dictionaries in public health, public health policy; culture, health and illness; public health monitoring & evaluation; health communication; modern nutrition in health; understanding environmental health; epidemiology; principles and practices of infectious diseases; adolescent health problems; waste treatment and disposal and public health research methods among others.

==== Collection ====
Print materials

»» Reference materials

»» Books

»» Journals

»» Theses

»» Periodicals (Pamphlets, Magazines, Health Reports, etc.)

»» Logbooks

»» EnLink collection on nutrition

»» Newspapers

Non-Print

»» OPAC (UGcat)

»» E-Resources (Online Databases, e-Books & e-Journals)

»» UGspace
