= Harold Balme =

British missionary

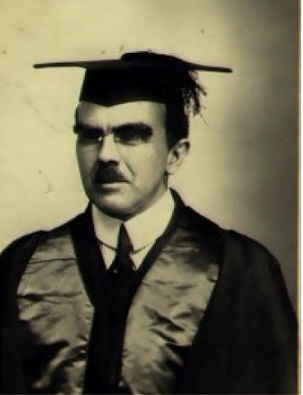
- Harold Balme in 1922
- Born: 28 May 1878; Hackney, Middlesex, England
- Died: 13 February 1953 (aged 74); London
- Occupation: medical missionary
- Spouse: Hilda E. Carr
- Children: David Mowbray Balme

Harold Balme OBE FRCS (Chinese: 巴慕德; pinyin: Bā Mùdé, 28 May 1878 in Hackney, Middlesex, England - 13 February 1953 in London) was a British medical missionary to China. He served as president of Cheeloo University from 1921 to 1927.

== Biography ==
Balme studied medicine at King's College Hospital and St Bartholomew's Hospital He went to Taiyuan in Shanxi as a medical missionary in 1906, staying in China for over 20 years. In 1913, he took a position as professor of surgery at Cheeloo University and superintendent of the University's hospital. Later, he was appointed dean of the university's medical school and president of the University in 1921. He was chair of the China Council of Medical Education.

After his return to the UK he was the medical officer-in-charge of rehabilitation at the Ministry of Health from 1943 to 1949 overseeing the hospitals at Bishop’s Stortford and Pinderfields Hospital. He was appointed Consultant Adviser on Rehabilitation.

Balme was an advocate for the development of the nursing profession. For many years he worked closely with the Royal College of Nursing (RCN) including as a Council Member from 1940 to 1946. Balme was consulted as part of Lord Horder's 1942 Nursing Reconstruction Committee Report for the RCN, specifically on basic training of nurses. He regularly wrote articles for the Nursing Times.

Post war he was Director of Welfare Services to the British Red Cross Society in 1945; a Consultant Adviser on Rehabilitation to the International Refugee Organization 1948; and he was an adviser on the rehabilitation of' physically handicapped persons to the United Nations, World Health Organisation and UNICEF in 1950. He was also Chair of the Technical Working Party on Rehabilitation set up by the United Nations and Specialized Agencies. In all these roles he was an advocate for those with a disability and those in need of rehabilitation.

A Fellow of the Royal College of Physicians (FRCP) he was also a Fellow of the Royal Society of Medicine. He was appointed to the Order of the British Empire (OBE) in the 1942 Birthday Honours.

His son was David Balme, a British philosopher specializing in Ancient Greek philosophy and science, and known for his studies in Aristotle's biology.

== Works ==
- Harold Balme, "Medical Missions in China", The Lancet, Vol. 198 No. 5119 pp 784–786, 1921
- Harold Balme, "China and Modern Medicine: A Study in Medical Missionary Development", London: United Council for Missionary Education, 1921.
- Harold Balme, "The trend of medical mission policy in China, International Review of Mission", Volume 13, Issue 2, pages 247-257, April 1924.
- Harold Balme, "A criticism of nursing education, with suggestions for constructive reform" 1937 (Oxford University Press)
- Harold Balme, "The Relief of Pain. A handbook of modern analgesia, etc" 1936 (J. & A. Churchill)
