= Cheeloo University =

Chinese university

Coordinates: 36°39′11″N 117°0′43″E

- Traditional Chinese: 齊魯大學
- Simplified Chinese: 齐鲁大学
Transcriptions
Standard Mandarin
- Hanyu Pinyin: Qílǔ Dàxué
- Wade–Giles: Ch'i2-lu3 Ta4-hsüeh2

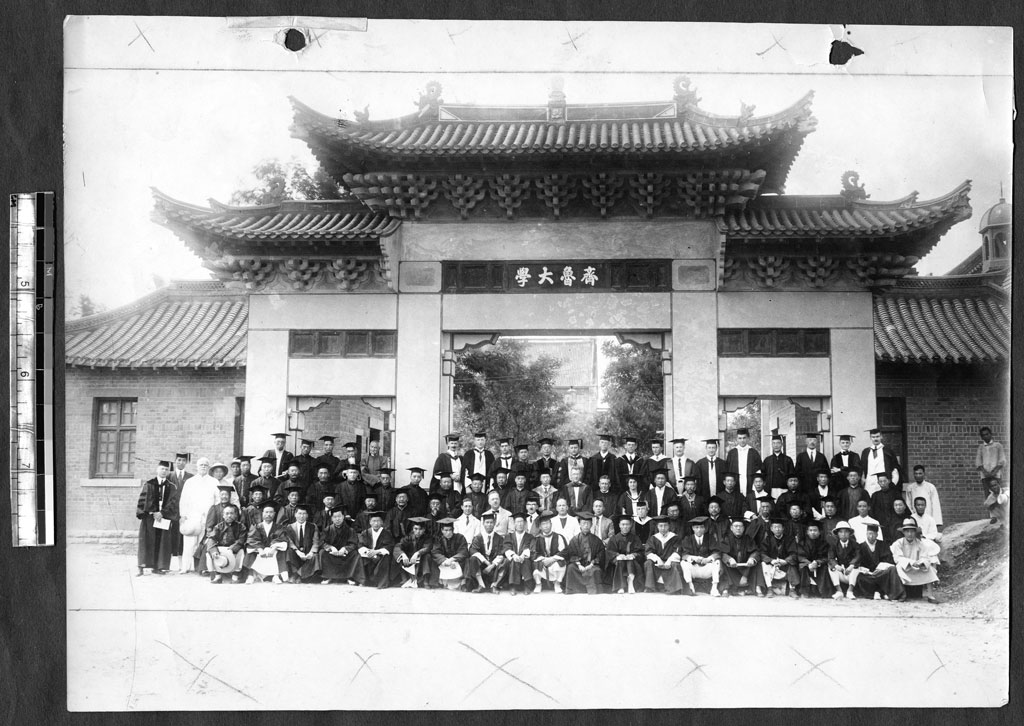
The newly-completed Alumni Gate in 1924 with graduates from Cheeloo University

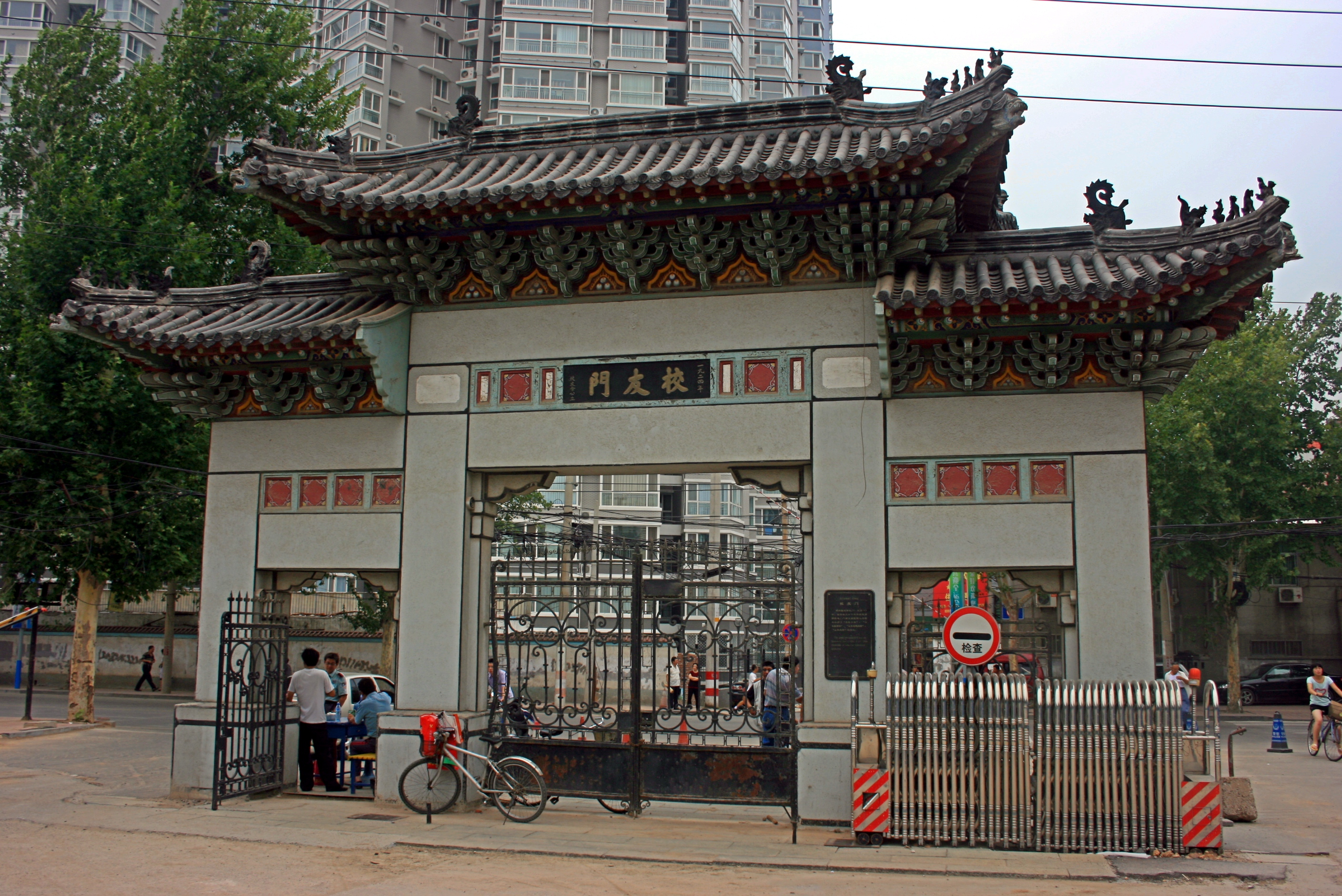
The Alumni Gate, which is now in Baotuquan Campus, in 2005

Cheeloo University (Chinese: 齊魯大學, alternatively known as "Shantung Christian College") was a university in China, established by Hunter Corbett American Presbyterian, and other English Baptist, Anglican, and Canadian Presbyterian mission agencies in early 1900 in China.

== History ==
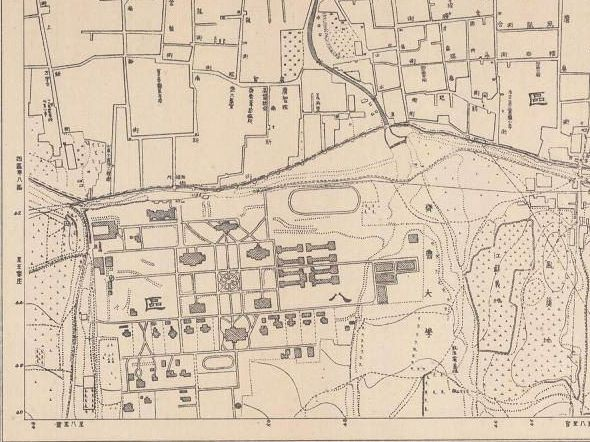
Campus map of Cheeloo University (1933)

In 1864, the Yi Wen School Boys' School at Tengchow was established by Hunter Corbett, Presbyterian missionary to Yantai, Shandong, China.

In 1882, Calvin Wilson Mateer, an American Presbyterian, converted the Tengchow Boys' School into Tengchow College in Dengzhou (part of Penglai), Shandong, China. In 1884, British Baptists established Tsingchow Boys' Boarding School, a theological college, in Qingzhou, Shandong, China.

By 1902, the American Presbyterians and English Baptists agreed to combine their schools in Shandong, forming an arts college in Wei County (Weixian, now part of Weifang), a theological college at Qingzhoufu (part of Zibo), and a medical college, in Jinan. The campus in Wei County was known as the "Courtyard of the Happy Way" (Chinese: 樂道院; pinyin: Lè dào yuàn) and was later used by the Japanese military as an internment camp for civilians during the Second World War.

In 1909, the colleges were consolidated as Shantung Protestant University (later changed to Shantung Christian University) in Jinan. The campus was designed by the Chicago architectural firm of Perkins, Fellows and Hamilton. The main buildings were Bergen Science Hall for Chemistry and Biology; Mateer Science Hall for Physics and Physiology, McCormick Hall for administration, and the Kumler Memorial Chapel in the center.

Construction began on Cheeloo Hospital of Shantung Christian University in 1914. It was completed in 1936.

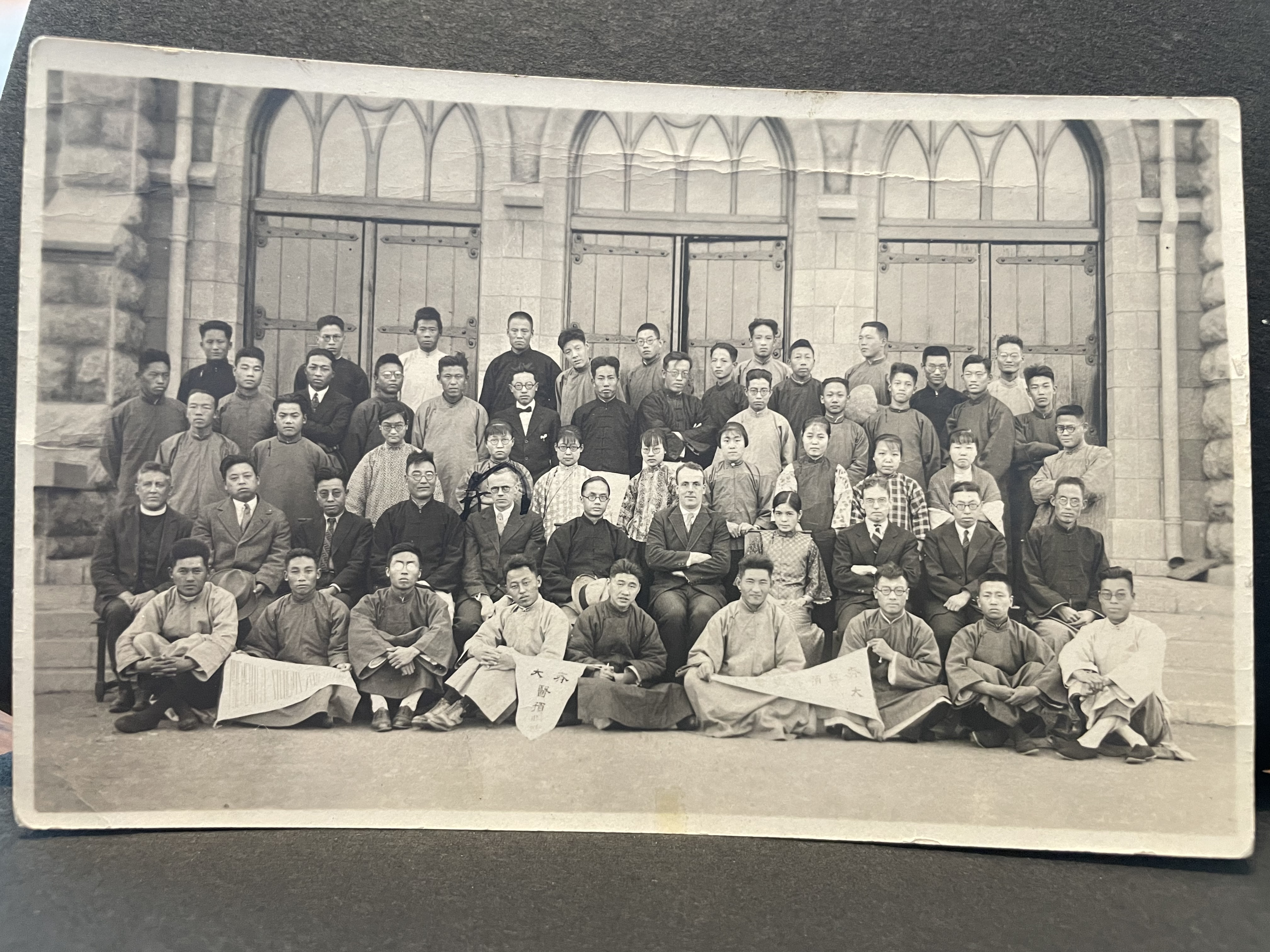
Shantung Christian College, Premedical Class of 1927.

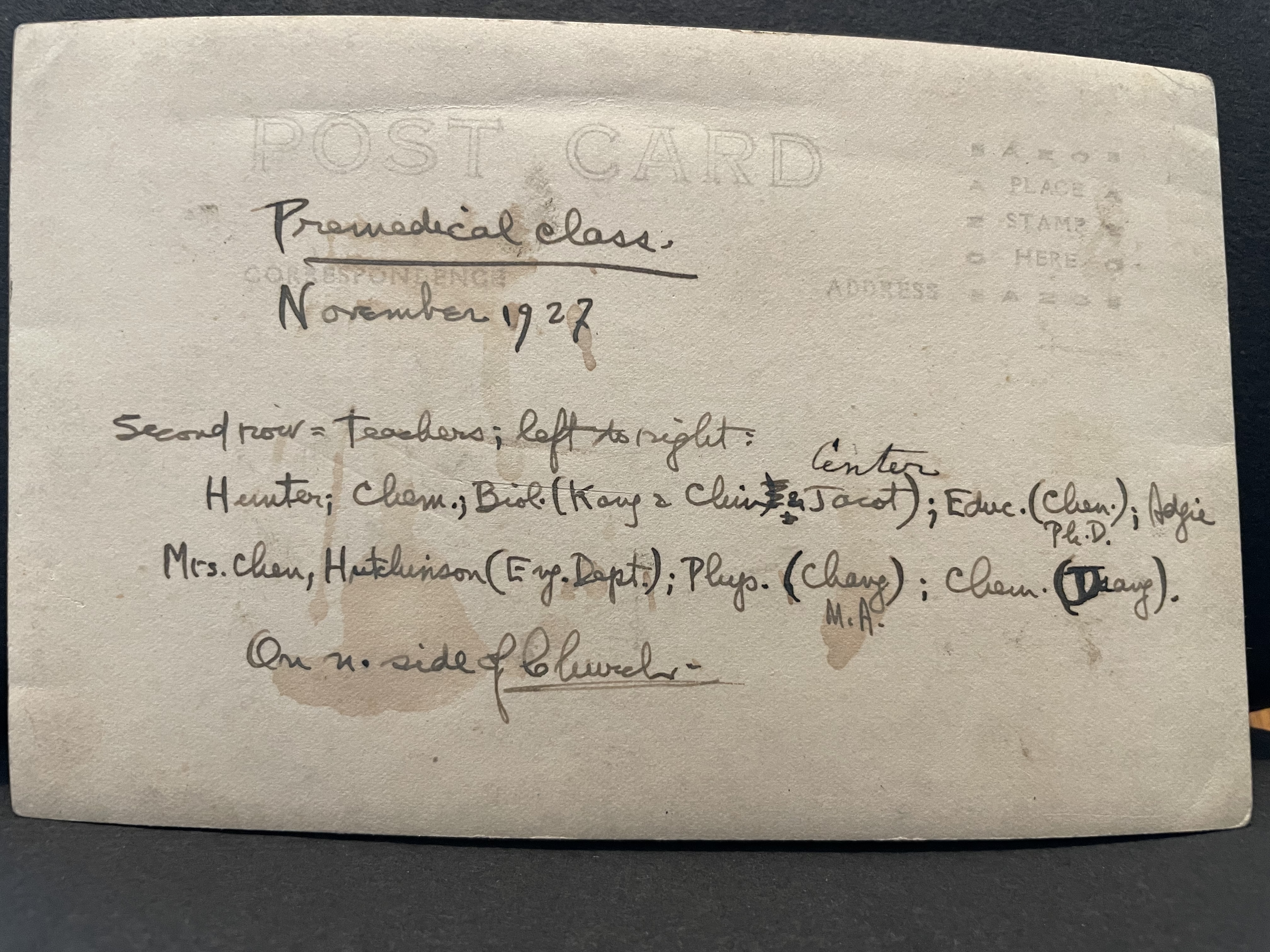
Premedical class and select names.

From 1916 to 1923, the former Peking Union Medical College, the Medical Department of Nanking University, the Hankow Medical College, and the North China Union Medical College for Women were all moved to Jinan. These departments were combined to form the co-educational Cheeloo University School of Medicine following the suggestion of the Dean of the Medical School at the time, Samuel Cochran. Dormitories and classes would first be opened to women in 1923. Eliza Ellen Leonard resigned as the first Dean of women in 1924 due to illness and died in the same year.

During the Second Sino-Japanese War from 1938 to 1945, the university joined five other universities to form West China Union University.

The university was dissolved in 1952 with the establishment of Communist rule. The College of Medicine was merged with the Shantung Provincial Medical College and the resulting Shandong Medical College occupied the entire campus. The College of Science was merged with the new National University in Nanjing while the College of Theology joined Nanking Theological Seminary. The College of Humanities was merged with Shandong University.

== Support ==
During its existence, Cheeloo University received support from various sponsoring and cooperating organizations:

Sponsoring organizations:

- American Presbyterian Missions, North (美北長老會)
- English Baptist Missionary Society (英國浸禮會)
- Church Missionary Society, England (英國聖公會)
- Canadian Presbyterian Mission (加拿大長老會), later merged into United Church of Canada (加拿大聯合教會)
- Woman's Foreign Missionary Society of the United Church of Canada (加拿大聯合教會女佈道會)
- Woman's Foreign Missionary Society of the Methodist Episcopal Church (美以美會女佈道會)
- American Board of Commissioners for Foreign Missions (公理會)
- Society for the Propagation of the Gospel in Foreign Parts (中華聖公會)

Cooperating organizations:

- English Presbyterian Mission (英國長老會)
- Harvard-Yenching Institute (哈佛燕京學社)
- Rockefeller Foundation (洛克菲勒基金會)
- Salt Merchants of Jinan (濟南鹽商會)

== Presidents ==
- Paul D. Bergen (Chinese: 柏尔根; pinyin: Bǎi Ěrgēn, 1904–1915)
- J. Percy Bruce (Chinese: 卜道成; pinyin: Bo Dàochéng, 1916–1920)
- Harold Balme (Chinese: 巴慕德; pinyin: Ba Mùdé, 1921–1927)
- Li Tianlu (李天祿, 1927–1929)
- Zhū Jīngnóng (朱經農, 1931–1933)
- Liú Shūmíng (刘書銘, 1935–1943)
- Edgar Chi-ho Tang (湯吉禾, 1943–1945)
- Wú Kèmíng (吴克銘, 1945–1949)
- David Yang (楊德齋, 1949–1952)

== Notable alumni and faculty ==
- Edgar Tang, university president
- B.A. Garside, professor of education
- Lao She (Chinese: 老舍; pinyin: Lǎo Shě),
- Harold Balme Dean of the medical school in the 1920s
- Lan-Hua Liu, dean of women in 1930s
- Henry Winters Luce, father of Henry R. Luce
- Helena Rosa Wright, pioneer in birth control and family planning
- Ernest Black Struthers, Professor and Dean of the Faculty of Medicine

== See also ==
- Shandong University
