= People's Liberation Army Navy Surface Force =

Surface warfare branch of the People's Liberation Army Navy

Flag of the People's Liberation Army Navy (PLAN)

The People's Liberation Army Navy Surface Force is the surface warfare branch of China's People's Liberation Army Navy (PLAN), consisting of all surface vessels in operational service with the PLAN. The PLAN Surface Force operates 661 ships organized into three fleets: the North Sea Fleet, the East Sea Fleet and the South Sea Fleet.

Since the late 20th century, the People's Liberation Army Navy has been turning away from its traditional focus on coastal and littoral warfare and instead prioritizing the development of blue water capabilities. This led to a significant reduction in overall fleet numbers as the PLAN has replaced a larger number of smaller ships with a smaller number of larger, and more capable and versatile ships, including destroyers, frigates, corvettes, amphibious warfare ships and large auxiliary ships. However the growing number of "blue water" capable warships has risen, and fleet numbers are projected to reach more than 500 units by the close of the 2020s. Meanwhile, according to the China Military Power Report published by the Pentagon, as of October 2023, China has the numerically largest navy in the world with an overall battle force of approximately 370 surface ships and submarines, including over 140 major surface combatants — in comparison, according to the U.S. Naval Vessel Register, the United States Navy's battle force is approximately 292 ships and submarines.

== Aircraft carriers ==
The PLAN Surface Force currently operates three aircraft carriers, with one more in development:

- Type 004 aircraft carrier - Under development.
- Type 003 aircraft carrier Fujian - In active service.
- Type 002 aircraft carrier Shandong - In active service.
- Type 001 aircraft carrier Liaoning - In active service.

=== Development ===
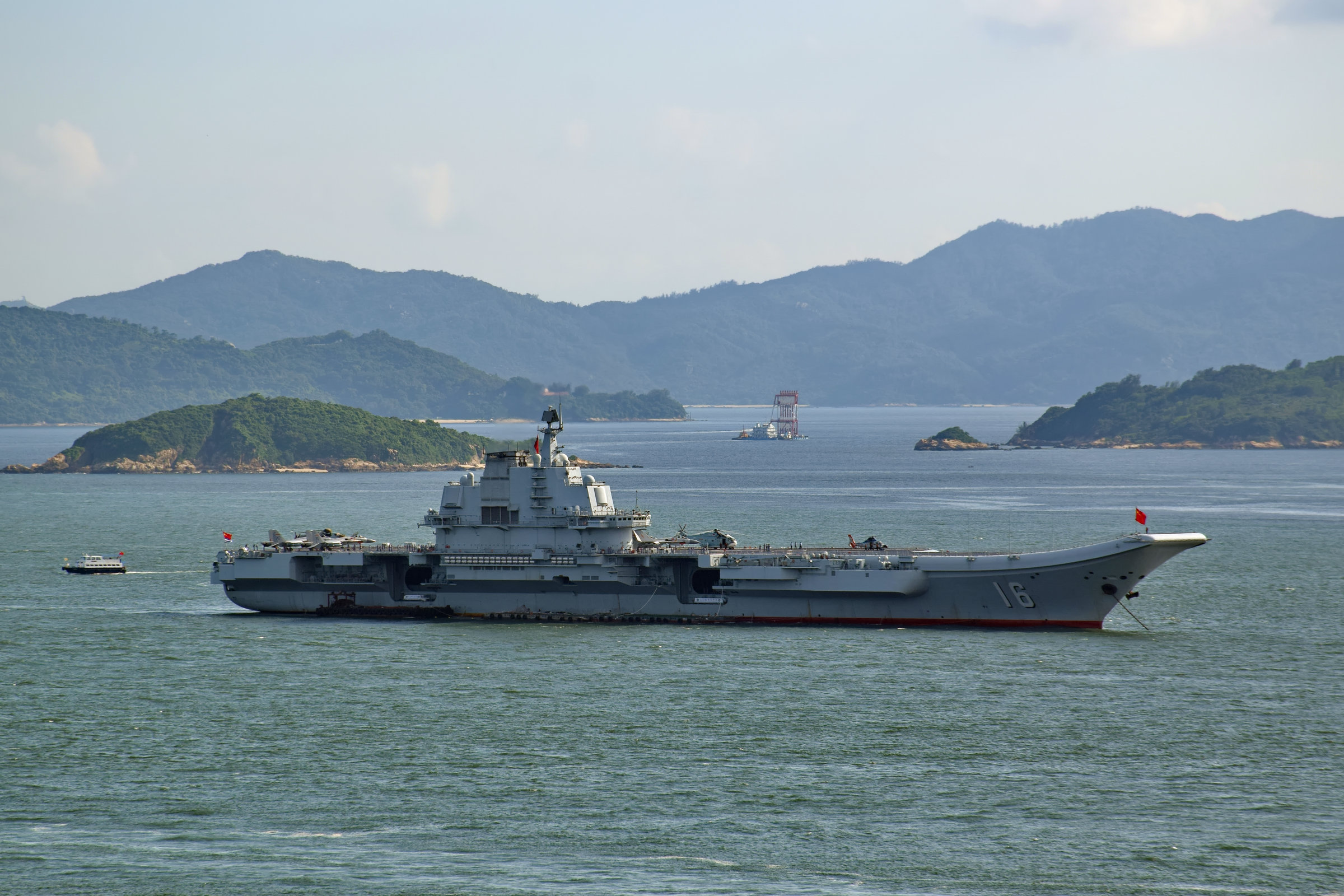
Aircraft Carrier Liaoning (16) at Hong Kong Waters

The 60,900 tonne Liaoning is the first operational aircraft carrier in service with the PLAN. Liaoning, previously known as Varyag, is a Kuznetsov-class aircraft carrier which the Chinese purchased from Ukraine in 1998 through a private tourist venture in Macau. At the time, Varyag was only 68% completed and stripped of all military equipment as well as her propulsion. After the purchase, Varyag was towed to Dalian, where she underwent extensive refurbishment, coordinated by the Dalian Shipbuilding Industry Company. On 10 August 2011, it was announced that the refurbishment of the new Liaoning was complete, and that the ship was undergoing sea trials. Liaoning was finally commissioned on 25 September 2012.

In July 2011, a senior researcher of the Academy of Military Sciences said China needed at least three aircraft carriers for its fleet. During the same month, another Chinese official announced that two aircraft carriers were being built at the Jiangnan Shipyard in Shanghai; the aircraft carriers were reportedly based on a similar design to Liaoning, suggesting a displacement of approximately 65,000 tonnes. A new Chinese variant of the Sukhoi Su-33 fighter aircraft, known as the Shenyang J-15 (or Flying Shark) was expected to fly from the new aircraft carriers.

In 2013, Chinese media reported that the PLAN is designing and planning to build a 110,000 tonne 'super aircraft carrier'. Media reports also stated that the current aircraft carriers under construction were based on Liaoning, but would be larger and would displace around 80,000 tonnes. The PLA Navy planned to establish three aircraft carrier battle groups by 2020. Liaoning and China's first domestically built carrier were to be part of the battle groups. One of the battle groups was to be deployed in the East China Sea, while the other two were to be deployed to the South China Sea.

On 31 December 2015, it was announced that China was building a second carrier in STOBAR configuration, displacing around 50,000 tonnes, with a length of 300m and an estimated capacity of 50 aircraft. The hull was launched on 26 April 2017 and was estimated to be operational by 2020. This carrier—PLAN's second aircraft carrier, Shandong—was put in commission on 17 December 2019, prior the estimated year of operational status.

China's third aircraft carrier, the Fujian, was begun in March 2015 and was launched on 17 June 2022. She is in service as of 5 November 2025. A second ship to this design may be under construction.

China's first nuclear-powered aircraft carrier is under development and is projected to be of about 110,000 tons, which would make her the world's largest-ever warship.

== Amphibious warfare ships ==
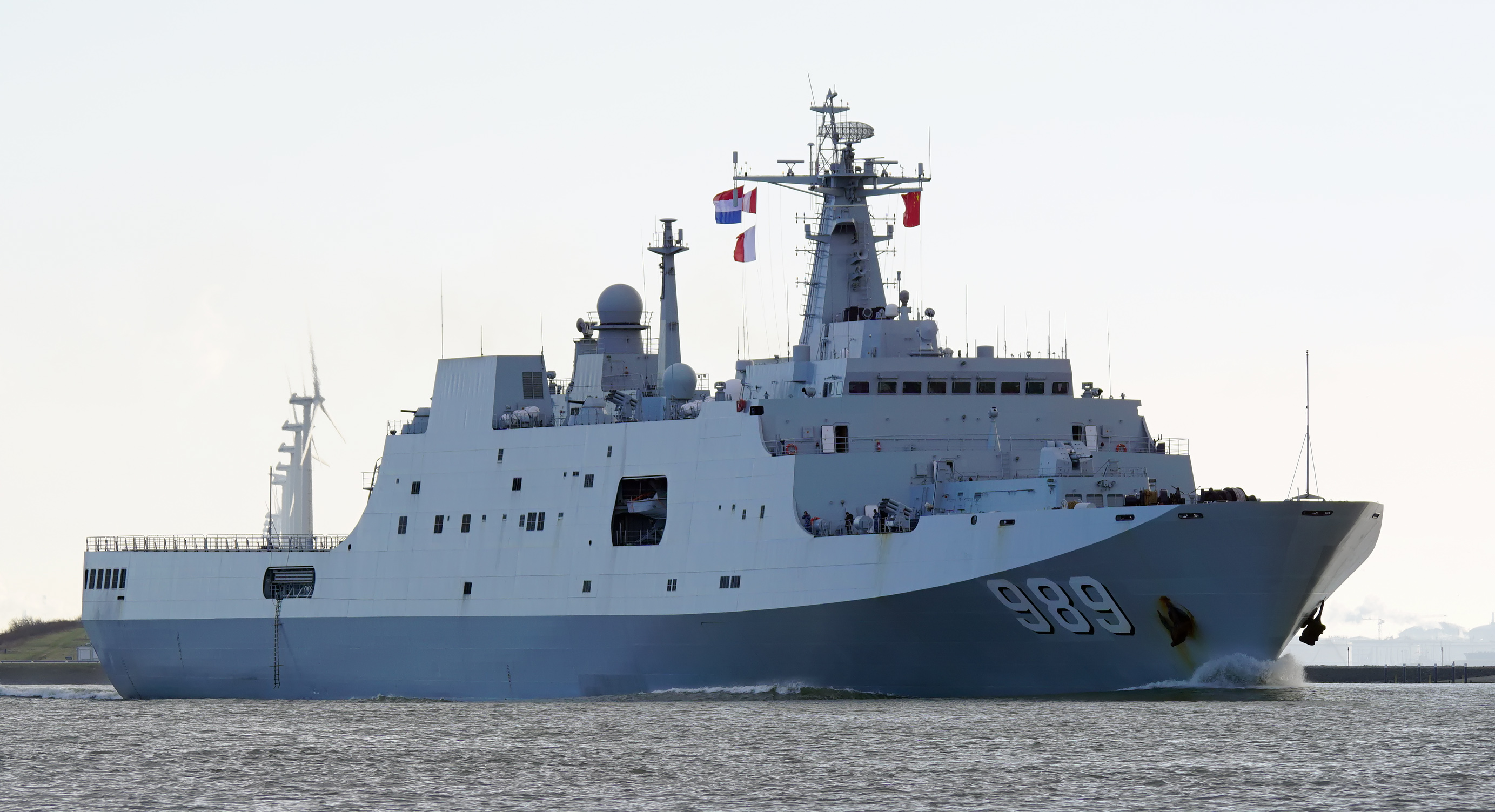
Type 071 amphibious transport dock (Yuzhao-class)

Landing Helicopter Docks (LHDs)

- Type 076 (NATO designation Yulan-class) — 1 in sea trials.
- Type 075 (NATO designation Yushen-class) — 4 in active service, 4 more projected.

Amphibious Transport Docks (LPDs)

- Type 071 (NATO designation Yuzhao-class) — 8 in active service with the PLAN, plus one vessel also supplied to Thailand.

Landing Ship, Tank (LSTs)

- Type 072A (NATO designation Yuting II-class) — 15 in active service.
- Type 072III (NATO designation Yuting-I-class) — 11 in active service.

Landing Ship, Medium (LSMs)

- Type 073 (NATO designation Yudao, Yudeng and Yunshu-class) — 11 in active service (10 Type 073A, 1 Type 073III).

Landing Craft

- Type 074A (NATO designation Yubei-class) — 6 in active service.
- Type 074 (NATO designation Yuhai-class) — 12 in active service.

=== Development ===
The construction of the large Yuzhao-class amphibious transport docks (LPDs) (pictured) indicated an important shift toward blue water capabilities for the PLAN. However, the Landing Ship, Tanks (LSTs) of the 072 series still constitute the core of PLAN amphibious capabilities. With approximately 26 confirmed in service, the PLAN possesses the capabilities to conduct amphibious operations in the littoral waters of the South East Asian region, as well as a limited capability in outer sea landings. Most vessels are only capable of transporting troops while some are capable of transporting limited numbers of armored vehicles.

In late 2012, it was reported that China may be developing a class of 40,000 to 48,000 tonne landing helicopter docks (LHDs). They came to be known as the Type 075 class. Three vessels of this class are in active service, with a fourth having been launched in December 2023. A total of eight are planned, although later units may be of the improved Type 076.

For a list of smaller landing craft of the PLAN, see: List of active People's Liberation Army Navy landing craft

== Destroyers ==
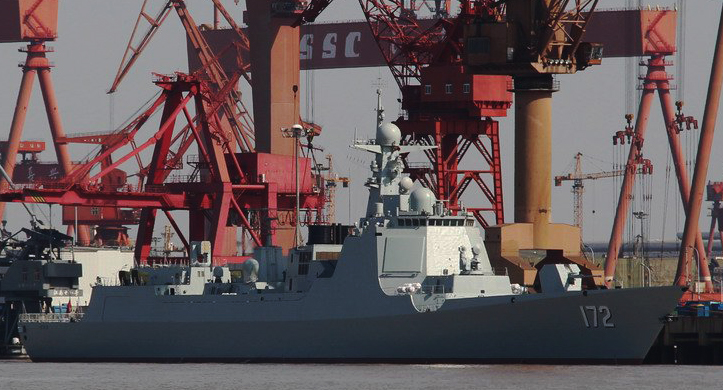
Type 052D destroyer (Luyang III-class)

Destroyers are the largest principal surface combatants in the People's Liberation Army Navy.

- Type 055 destroyer (NATO designation Renhai-class) — 10 in active service, including the first two of a second batch of eight under development under the 14th Five-Year Plan (2021-2025).
- Type 052D destroyer (NATO designation Luyang III-class) — 25 in active service, 3 launched, 6 under construction
- Type 051C destroyer (NATO designation Luzhou-class) — 2 in active service.
- Type 052C destroyer (NATO designation Luyang II-class) — 6 in active service.
- Type 052B destroyer (NATO designation Luyang I-class) — 2 in active service.
- Project 956E/956EM destroyer (NATO designation Sovremenny-class) — 4 in active service.
- Type 051B destroyer (NATO designation Luhai-class) — 1 in active service.
- Type 052 destroyer (NATO designation Luhu-class) — 2 in active service.

=== Development ===
The People's Liberation Army Navy had traditionally focused on the principles of coastal defense. With this came a series of warship designs based on the Soviet Navy's destroyers and frigates. The first PLAN destroyers were the Anshan class, directly purchased from the Soviet Union. These were armed with torpedoes and various surface- and air-warfare guns. The Anshan's effectiveness in naval warfare was significantly enhanced with the torpedo tubes being replaced by anti-ship missile launchers. Although retired from the active service, the Anshan class destroyers remain on PLAN's list and act as training ships and perform public relations duties.

==== Type 051 ====
The Type 051 Luda class followed from the 1970s onwards, with many similarities to the Soviet Kotlin class. The Ludas were armed with six anti-ship missiles and various guns and ASW weapons. Both the Luda and Anshan were key vessels to PLAN's coastal defense doctrines, as small coastal defense destroyers. These ships were all armed with mostly manually operated air defense artillery with no surface-to-air missiles and no ASW torpedoes. One Luda class ship, Guangzhou (160), was lost in an accident. By the mid-1990s, all Anshan class destroyers were retired.

Since the late 1980s, the older 051 Luda went through various upgrade and refit programmes. One vessel was refitted with a double hangar and helicopter deck. At least four others were upgraded with HQ-7 short range SAM, new automatic air defense artillery (as opposed to the old manual mounts), torpedoes and sixteen YJ83 anti-ship missiles. Though the other remaining ships continue to retain original weaponry, they had all undergone major refits to extend their surface lives, including satellite communications and navigation systems to allow them to operate beyond coastal waters.

As of 2021, all Ludas have been retired.

==== Type 052 ====
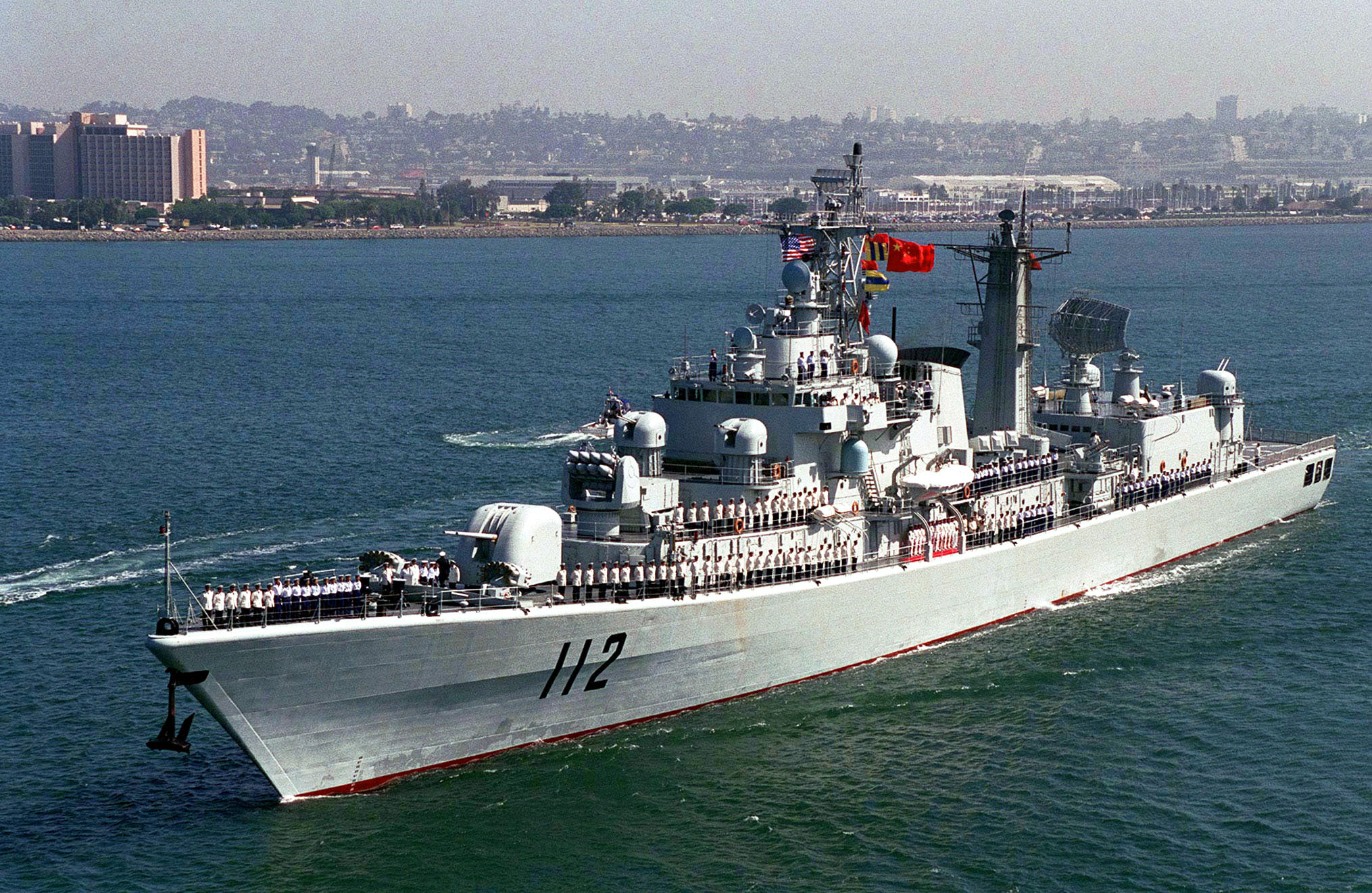
Type 052 destroyer Harbin (112) pre-refit

In the 1980s, the PLAN focus shifted toward blue-water multi-role operations, alongside the import of Western systems such as the General Electric LM2500 gas turbines, resulting in the Type 052 Luhu class. The first vessel, Harbin (112) (seen and commissioned by the early 1990s), was a significant shift from traditional Chinese warship design. These were the first Chinese attempt at truly modern combat vessels and there was much more focus on air defense and ASW warfare, including the installation of an 8-celled Crotale launcher, a short range missile system later indigenously produced as HQ-7. A second vessel, the Qingdao (113) was launched later in the mid-1990s.

Since the 2000s, the 052 Luhu class has been through various upgrade and refit programmes. Both Harbin (112) and Qingdao (113) have undergone major refits and both now carry sixteen YJ83 Anti-ship missiles and remain in service.

As a result, two subclasses of destroyers were formed in the PLAN, namely the 051 series and 052 series. There are certain design differences between the two subclasses, such as the 051 series ships using mature indigenous steam turbine engines, compared to marine gas turbines on the 052 series, which were at the time less mature and had to be imported.

==== Type 051B ====
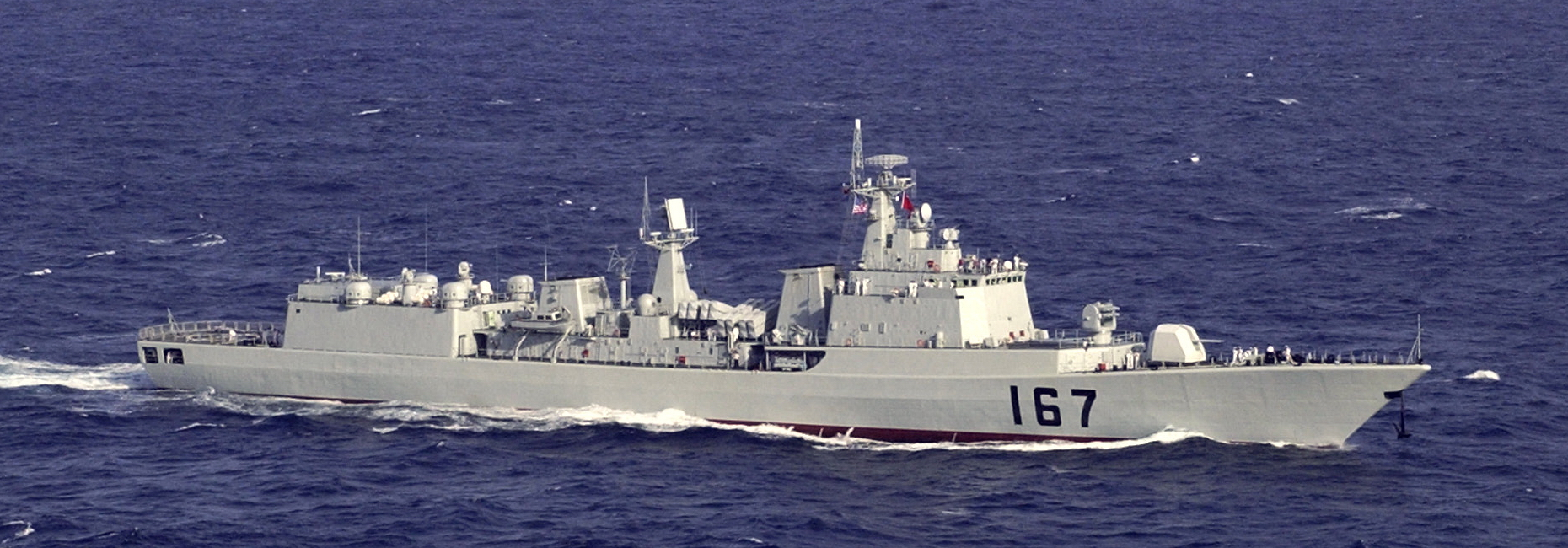
Type 051B destroyer Shenzhen (167) before refit

Near the end of the 1990s, the Type 051B Luhai class was introduced as a new design (not based on the Type 051) utilising domestic steam turbines due to Western embargo on the LM2500 gas turbines. The class was an attempt at modernising naval construction, utilising more modularity and stealth, as well as refining knowledge accumulated from the earlier Type 052 such as integrating foreign subsystems more effectively. The 051B was still obsolete by Western standards, equipped with only short-range anti air capability and just one ship was built - the Shenzhen 167 (originally 115), built by Dalian in 1996-99; it has since undergone major refits. Similar to the 052 Luhu class, it carried sixteen YJ83 anti-ship missiles, improved HQ-7 short-range SAM (Based on the Crotale), and had enhanced electronic, sensor and weaponry capabilities. A major refit in 2015 upgraded it with medium-range anti-air capabilities via vertical-launch HQ-16 (32 missiles, 40 km range), sixteen supersonic YJ-12 anti-ship missiles and two Type 1130 CIWS.

==== Type 956E / 956EM (Sovremmeny) ====
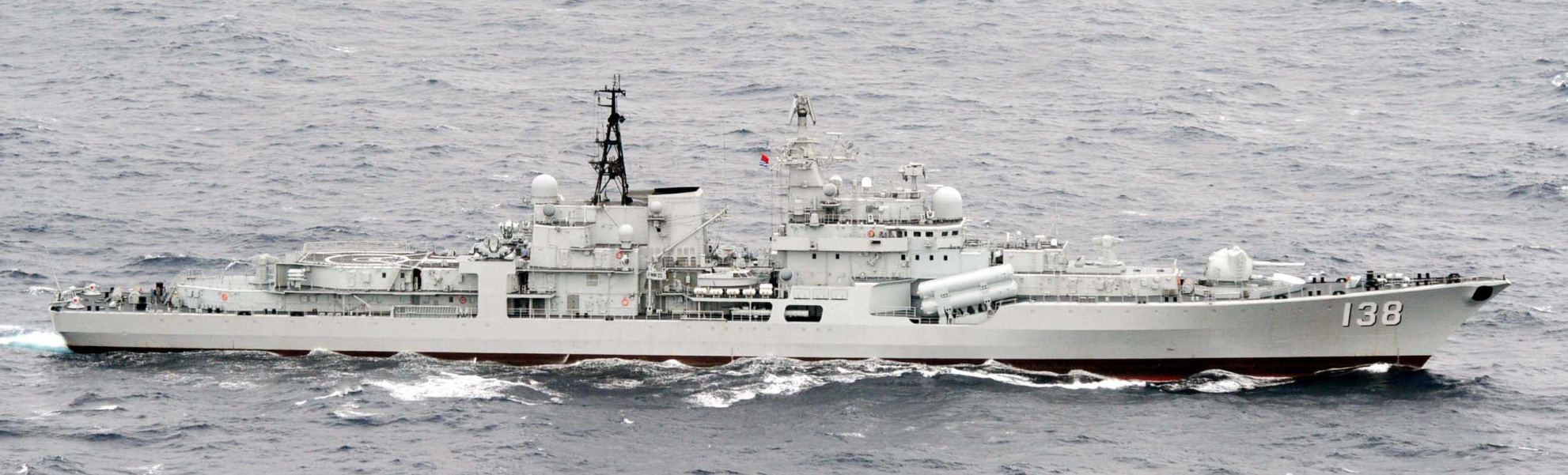
Type 956EM destroyer Taizhou (138) pre-refit

In 1996, China signed a deal with Russia for the purchase of two Type 956E Sovremenny class destroyers. The first ship (renamed Hangzhou) arrived in January 2000 and the second (renamed Fuzhou) in January 2001. These ships significantly improved the PLAN's fighting capabilities. Each ship displaces 7,940 tons full loaded. Weaponry included ASW torpedoes and mortar launchers, AK-630 automatic CIWS cannons, two twin mountings of 130 mm rapid fire cannons, the short/medium-ranged SA-N-7 SAM (48 missiles, 25 km range) and the SS-N-22 Sunburn supersonic sea-skimming anti-ship missile. Two improved Type 956EM vessels (renamed as Taizhou and Ningbo) were acquired in 2002, and include a longer range SS-N-22 missile, improved air defense, and the Kashtan CIWS. Although the software was upgraded to accommodate the improved SA-N-12, it is unclear if it entered service.

The class is undergoing refit. Hangzhou (136) has had its SA-N-7 SAM replaced with vertical-launch HQ-16 (32 missiles, 40 km range), SS-N-22 anti-ship missiles replaced by eight YJ-12 anti-ship missiles and fitted with HQ-10 CIWS.

==== Type 052B ====
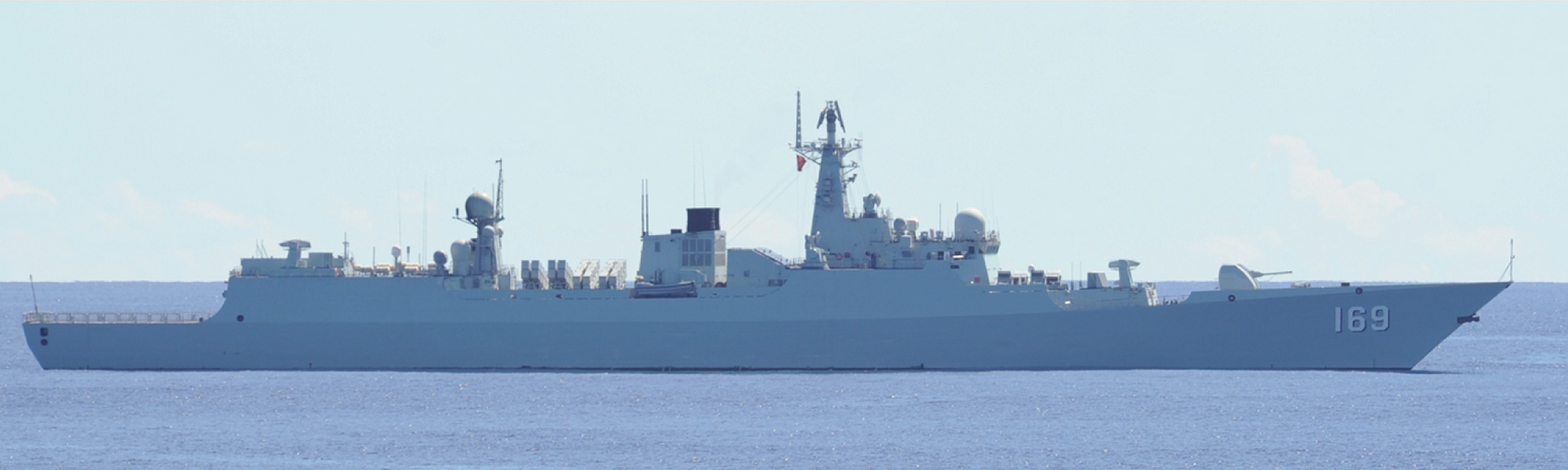
Type 052B destroyer Wuhan (169)

In 2001, production of the 052 line was restarted as the Type 052B after a replacement of the LM2500 gas turbines was found, in the form of the Ukrainian GT25000/DA80. It was initially planned to be the PLA's first modern long range anti-air destroyer featuring a new stealthy design, the domestic Type 346 flat-panelled AESA radar and HQ-9 missiles but development of the missile was not ready in time. Hence, it instead adopted many Russian and indigenous weapons and sensors. Just two units were produced.

Its armament included two indigenous Type 730 CIWS (first of its kind in China), sixteen YJ83 anti-ship missiles, two Russian SA-N-12 Grizzly medium-range SAM (48 missiles, 32 km range), torpedoes, anti-submarine rockets, a 100 mm artillery mount, and a hangar to hold one Kamov KA-28 ASW helicopter.

==== Type 052C ====
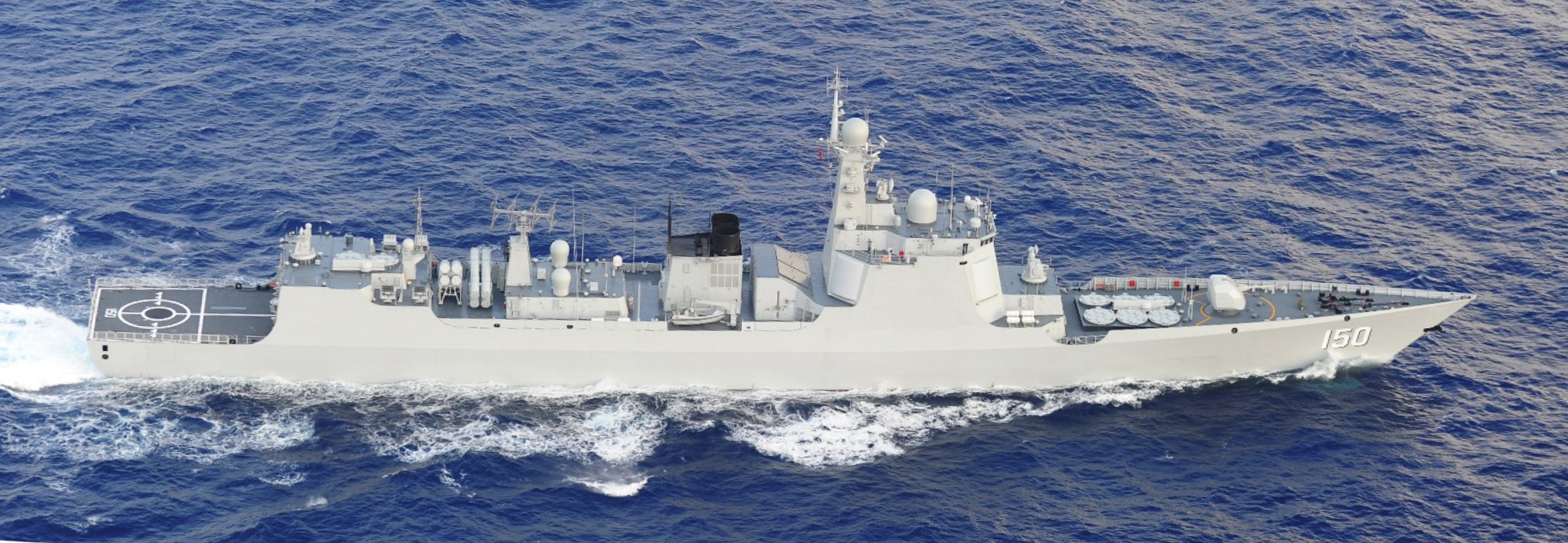
Type 052C destroyer Changchun (150) in 2018

In 2002, the Type 052C followed, using the same Ukrainian GT25000/DA80 gas turbines. The 052C became the first PLA warship with true long range anti-air capability. It included, for the first time, the domestic Type 346 flat-panelled AESA radar and indigenous HQ-9 long-range SAM (48 missiles, 200 km range) launched via concentric VLS, a new anti-ship cruise missile known as the YJ-62 and two Type 730 CIWS.

Production was stalled after just 2 ships due to initial failures in localising the Ukrainian GT25000/DA80 gas turbines. Production was restarted in the 2010s after success in localising the gas turbines, and in the end a total of 6 were produced.

==== Type 051C ====
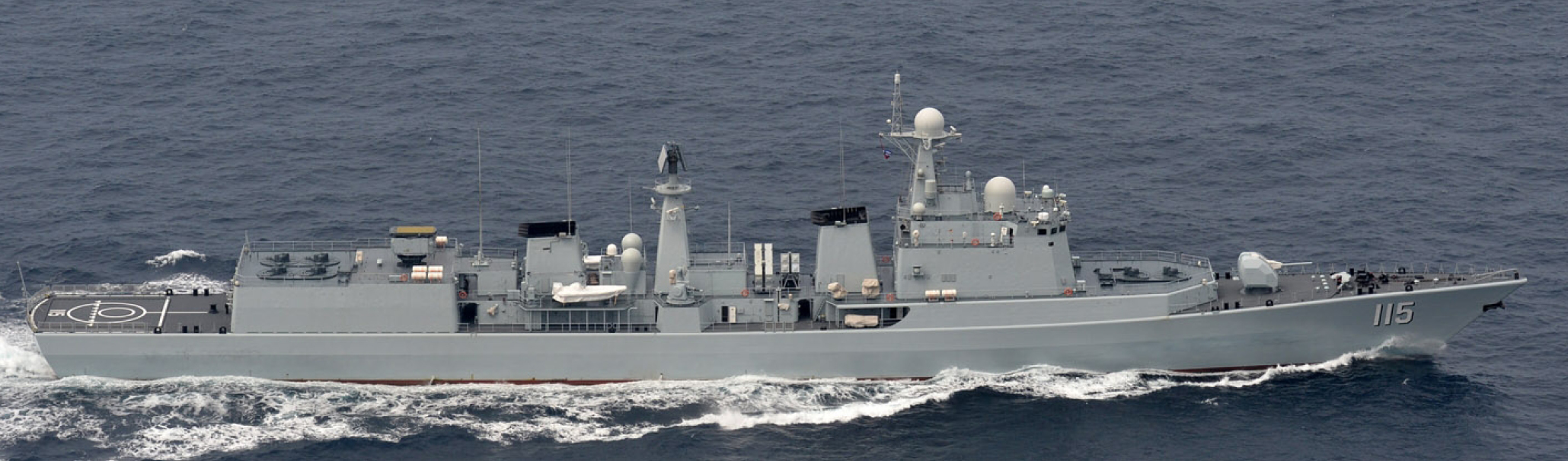
Type 051C destroyer Shenyang (115) in 2015

Due to the stall in 052C production, the 051 series was restarted in 2003 as the Type 051C, using the same hull and layout as the 051B Luhai class and domestic steam turbines. Initial construction was delayed by the slow acquisition of the Russian S-300FM long range SAM.

It was intended to be a stop gap measure to provide long range area air defense to the fleet by mating the mature hull design with proven foreign SAM system that was more capable than that of the Type 052B destroyer. The ship uses concentric VLS launchers with the Russian S-300FM air defense missile (48 missiles, 150 km range). Compromises had to be made, such as forgoing a helicopter hangar to fit the S-300FM systems, forgoing the flat panelled AESA radar for a more conventional Top Plate radar and forgoing any CIWS. It also reverted to the older YJ83 anti-ship missiles.

Construction of the 051C was stopped after just 2 ships as the 052C development was finalised in 2008 and continued production.

==== Type 052D ====
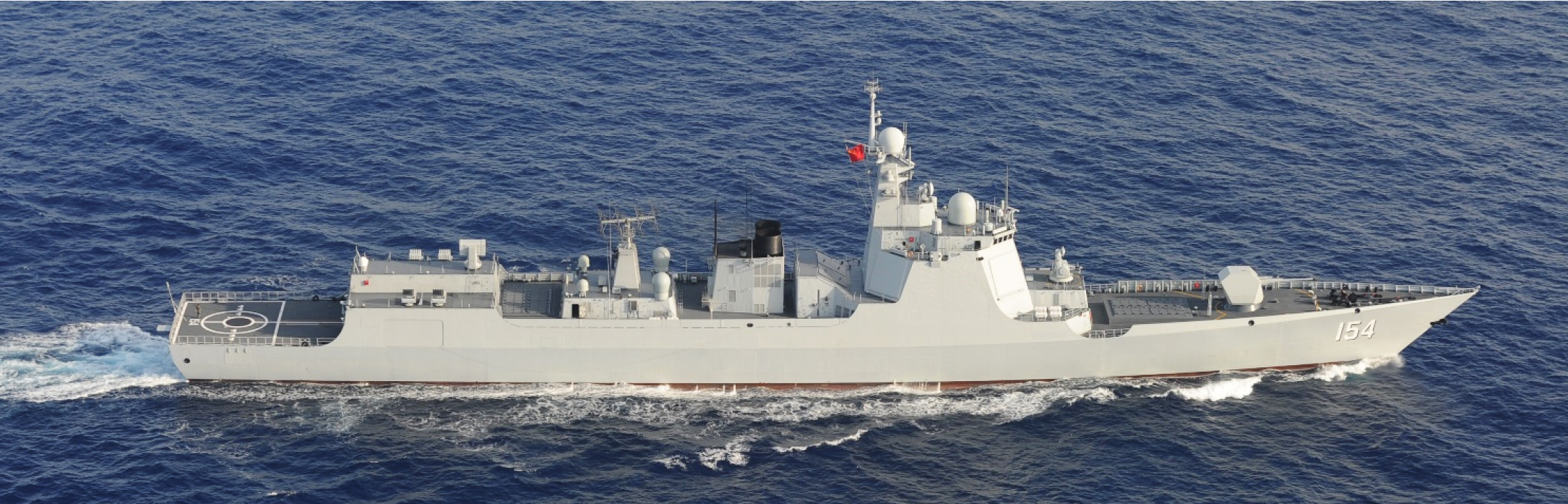
Type 052D destroyer Xiamen (154) in 2018

In 2012, the Type 052D destroyer started construction, with a design largely based on the 052C, but equipped with a universal VLS system that can fire 64 missiles of different variety, an updated Type 346A flat-panelled AESA radar and a new missile-based HQ-10 CIWS.

The 052D represents the ultimate culmination of the 051 and 052 series of destroyers, with all key systems such as gas turbines, flat-panelled AESA radars and HQ-9 long range air defence missiles fully localised, as well as a new YJ-18 long range supersonic anti-ship missile.

It has since been mass-produced, with 25 units produced as of 2022, 4 under construction and 8 more planned for a total of 37, more than all previous classes combined.

==== Type 055 ====
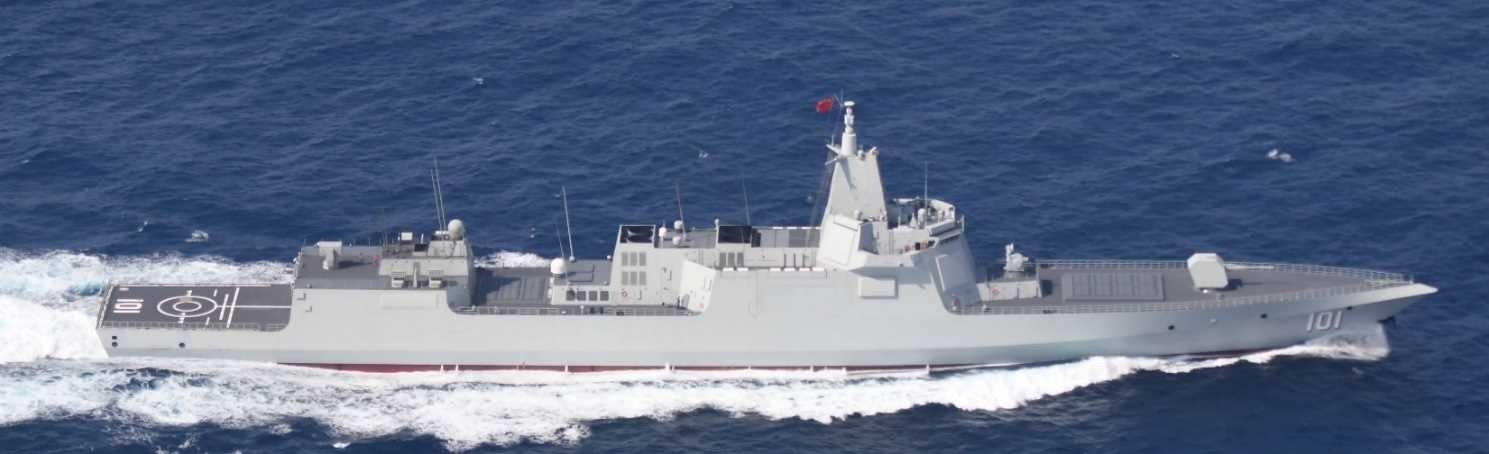
Type 055 destroyer Nanchang (101) in 2021

Currently the first eight Type 055 destroyers - the Nanchang, the Lhasa, the Dalian, the Yan'an, the Anshan, the Zunyi, the Wuxi and the Xianyang - which are Asia's biggest surface combatant warships (aircraft carriers and amphibious assault ships not included) since the Second World War, were in active service by the end of 2022, four with the North Sea Fleet and four with the South Sea Fleet. A second (improved) batch of eight are under construction under the 14th Five-Year Plan (2021-2025) of which the first two - the Dongguan and Anqing - entered service in 2025; some of these may be to an improved Type 055A Class.

The Type 055 destroyer is China's biggest surface combatant until now. It was designed to be a modern, multi-purpose warship, with four enormous Type 346B AESA radars and an integrated mast containing intelligence equipment, electronic countermeasures, and fire control radars. Armament includes 112-cell modular VLS able to operate with a variety of missiles, including land-attack cruise missiles, and a new 130 mm naval gun. Its displacement in excess of 12,000 tons and upgraded VLS capacity has led to the United States classifying it as a guided missile cruiser rather than a destroyer and as a result, analysts have compared it to both the U.S. Navy's Ticonderoga class cruiser and the Zumwalt class destroyer.

== Frigates ==
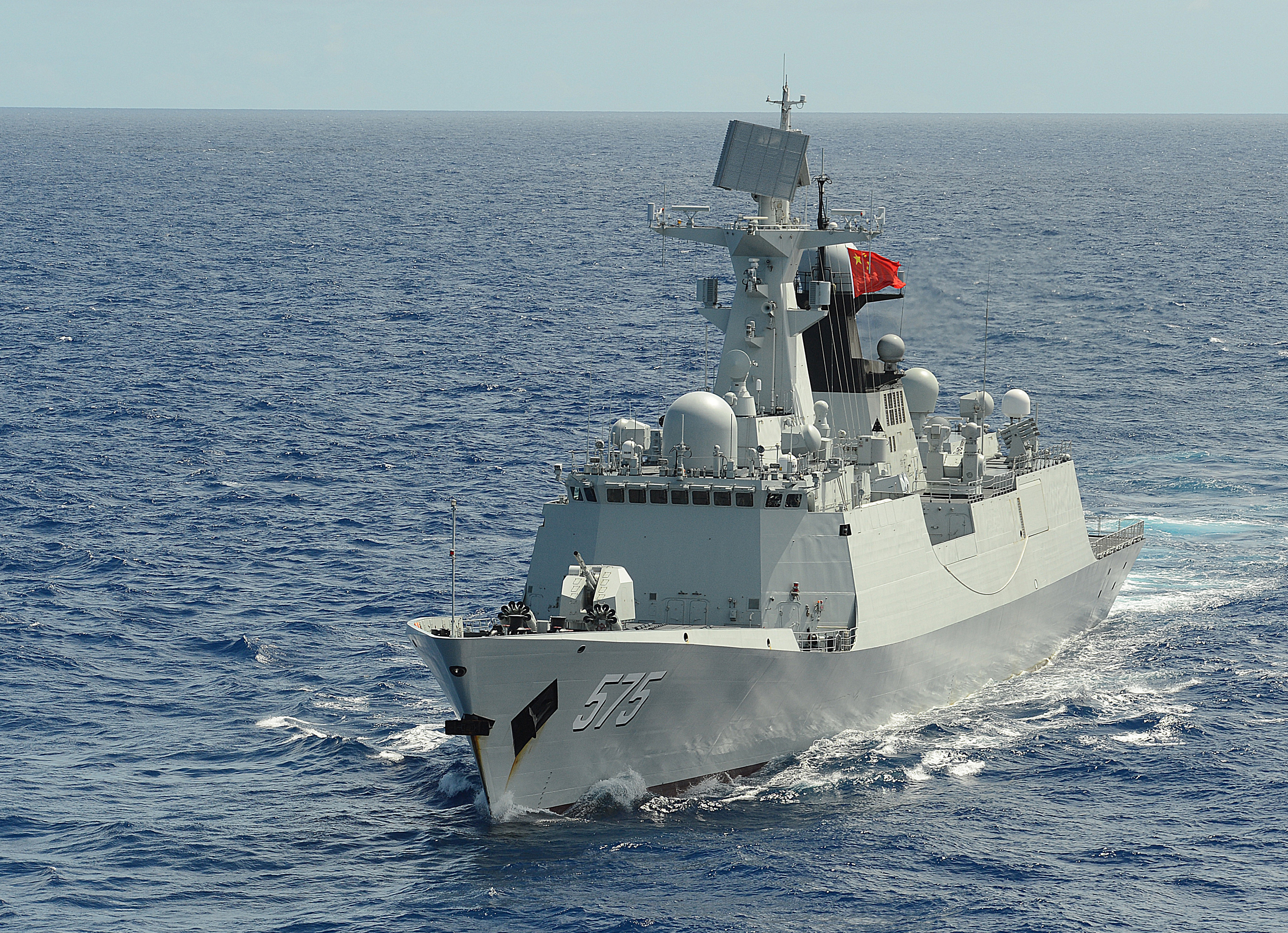
Type 054A frigate (Jiangkai II-class)

Frigates are the most numerous principal surface combatants in the People's Liberation Army Navy. In spite of the more recent trend to construction of larger warships, like destroyers, this status is unlikely to change in the near future:

- Type 054B frigate (NATO designation Jiangkai III-class) - 2 in active service.
- Type 054A frigate (NATO designation Jiangkai II-class) - 40 in active service.
- Type 054 frigate (NATO designation Jiangkai I-class) - 2 in active service.
- Type 053H3 frigate (NATO designation Jiangwei II-class) - 8 in active service.
- Type 053 frigate (NATO designation Jianghu-class) - 3 in active service (1 Type 053H1, 2 Type 053H1G).

=== Development ===
Frigates were the first large surface combatants made available to the PLAN. The Soviet Union sold several frigates to the PLAN in the 1950s, including kits for four Riga-class frigates. These four ships were assembled in China in 1955-58 as the Type 6601 frigate (NATO designation Chengdu Class), and comprised the Chengdu 507 and Guiyang 505 (both built by Hudong, Shanghai), and the Hengyang 508 and Kunming 506 (both built by the Huangpu Shipyard in Guangzhou). They were followed in 1963-69 by five frigates to a domestic design developed from the Riga class; these ships constituted the Type 65 class (NATO designation Jiangnan Class) and comprised the prototype Haikou 529 built at the Jiangnan Shipyard in Shanghai, and four further ships all built at the Huangpu Shipyard in Guangzhou - the Xiaguan 501, Nanchong 502, Kaiyuan 503 and Dongchuan 504. These frigates became the foundation of Chinese built designs, such as the Type 053 frigates. These ships were mostly armed with naval guns, though later designs managed to replace torpedo tubes with a twin launcher for SS-N-2 Styx anti-ship missiles.

Initial attempts to fit anti-aircraft missiles to frigates resulted in a fresh design known as the Jiangdong Class (Type 053K). The first ship - the Yingtan 531 - was commissioned in 1975 carrying two twin launchers for the HQ-61B short ranged SAM, this vessel served as the sole PLAN SAM capable frigate until the 1990s. A second ship of this class - the Zhongdong 532 - was launched in 1975 but was never completed, and scrapped after 1986. Both ships were built by Hudong, Shanghai. Their effectiveness in engaging missiles and aircraft was thought to be limited. The same hull was later used for the Jianghu class (Type 053H) class. During the 1970s the PLAN introduced the Jianghu class. Essentially, a scaled down version of the Luda class of destroyers, this large class of missile frigates would have many follow-on variants. The first hull, 515 Xiamen was completed in 1975, and mass production followed until 1996. All Jianghu class ships are armed with four SY-2 anti-ship missiles (indigenous and improved versions of initial Soviet SS-N-2 Styx). Gun armaments vary across the class, including a single 100 mm mount or a more modern Type 79 100 mm twin mounts. The latest eight hulls (built during the early 1990s) feature automatic twin 37 mm Type 76A AA guns. One Jianghu, hull 516, was refitted recently to carry a battery of 122 mm rockets, fixed on stabilized launchers. A total of 27 Jianghu Is were built, and they remain in use today with various upgrades and refits to extend their service life. The vessels are deficient in modern anti-aircraft, anti-ship and anti-submarine fighting capabilities.

The first Chinese frigate to carry a helicopter was a modified Jianghu II, the Siping 544, dubbed as the Jianghu IV class. Only one ship was modified, despite great optimism that most of the class would follow suit. The Siping is believed to perform more as a test ship, with a single helicopter hangar and a new single 100 mm gun mount similar to the French Creusot-Loire rapid fire main gun. Its fighting capabilities have been retained with twin SY-2 missiles and AA guns. The fitting of the helicopter hangar meant the sacrifice of the aft SY-2 missile launchers. A further step for the Jianghu class was made by the appearance of the Jianghu III/V class, first commissioned in 1986. These ships are the first to have air conditioning onboard Chinese warships. They feature heavy Western influence, and instead of using the SY-2 missiles, they are armed with the YJ8 series. The Jianghu V class carries the YJ82 with extended range. There are three ships in the Jianghu III class and six ships in Jianghu V class.

The Jiangwei I class was launched in 1991 and represented a shift away from the old Jianghu concept. Major features included a sextuple HQ-61B SAM launcher, modernized electronics and radar, six YJ8 missiles, automatic Type 76F anti-aircraft guns and a hangar and helicopter deck for one French AS 565 or Z-9C helicopter. Four of the Jiangwei I were built between 1990 and 1994. Though a great versatile design, it suffered the same weaknesses in air defense, as its SAM had to be manually reloaded as well as unsatisfactory performance. The four ships have been refitted since for life extension, and continue to serve the PLAN. The HQ-61 SAM system was later replaced by HQ-7 SAM systems during refits. The first Jiangwei II was launched in 1997. This has a similar design layout to the Jiangwei I but has incorporated major improvements. These included eight (not six) YJ82/3 missiles, octuple HQ-7 SAM (replacing the HQ-61B), improved fully automated main gun, and a redesigned aft structure. Ten Jiangwei IIs were built, the last ship commissioned in 2005. All Jiangweis have since been refitted with a stealthier gun casing for their 100 mm main guns.

In 2005, the Type 054 frigate (in NATO parlance the Jiangkai I class) entered PLAN service (with hulls 525 and 526). The Type 054 is considerably stealthier than all previous PLAN frigate designs. These two ships (the Ma'anshan and Wenzhou) are each armed with an HQ-7 octuple launcher, eight YJ83 anti-ship missiles, a 100 mm main gun, four AK630 CIWS turrets, ASW torpedoes and rocket launchers, carries one Ka-28 Helix or Z-9C, and displaces 3,400 tons. This represents a new generation of frigate design in the PLAN, and a shifting focus on larger multi-role platforms. The air defense missile armament is no better than the Jiangwei II class although this may be upgraded later. The original Type 054 has now been superseded by the Type 054A frigate (Jiangkai II), which continues in series production (up to 40 units are completed and active, while another 10 are under construction or planned). The 054A features a number of important improvements over the original 054. The main air defense armament has been upgraded to a 32-cell VLS HQ-16 medium-range SAM system, giving area air-defence capability for the first time to PLAN frigates. In addition, the four AK630 CIWS have been replaced by two autonomous Type 730 CIWS. The Type 054A is altogether a well balanced and stealthy frigate design, with considerable firepower and multi-role versatility. The first two units of a fresh development (the Type 054B frigate) - the Luohe and Qinzhou - entered service in 2025.

== Corvettes ==
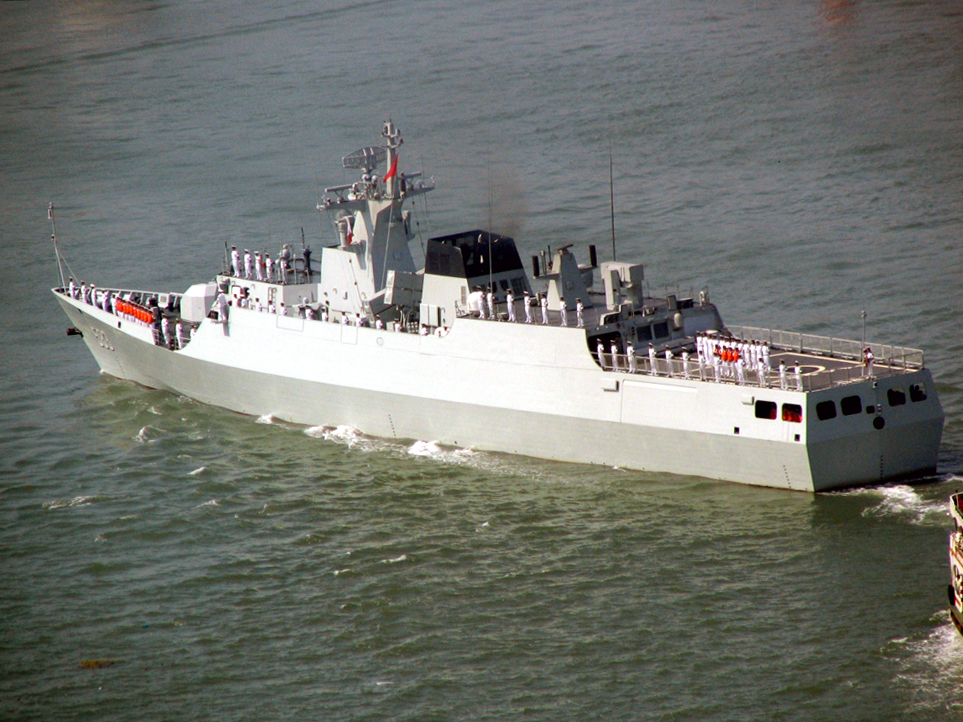
Type 056 corvette (Jiangdao-class)

Corvettes are the smallest principal surface combatants in the People's Liberation Army Navy. Traditionally the PLAN operated extensive fleets of missile and gun boats for defence of its littoral waters. However, as the PLAN moved towards developing blue water capabilities, there is a growing need to replace a larger number of smaller vessels with a smaller number of larger and much more capable vessels:

- Type 056 corvette (NATO designation Jiangdao-class) - 50 in active service (50 Type 056A). Note: 22 Type 056 retired and transferred to CCG.

=== Development ===
Following the designing and building of the Pattani class corvette for the Royal Thai Navy in the mid-2000s, speculation of a domestic variant of the design was rife. The speculations were confirmed in November 2010 during a visit by Maj. Gen. Wang Junli, Deputy commander of the Hong Kong Garrison and the Hong Kong University's Vice-Chancellor Tsui Lap-chee when a model of the Type 056 was presented. The first ship was launched in May 2012.

Though the Type 056 appears in the 21st century, the design concept can be referred to as early as the 1980s, when the PLAN were considering developing a larger patrol ship to replace the Type 037 corvette to improve the living conditions on the ship, which was firstly called by Type 038. However, this concept was not realized until the appearance of Type 056 in 2012 due to the shortage of funds.

The Type 056 has a stealthy hull design with sloped surface and a reduced superstructure clutter. There is a helipad at the stern for a light helicopter but has no organic helicopter support facilities. The main anti-ship armament consists of YJ-83 sea-skimming anti-ship cruise missiles in two twin-cell launchers. The primary anti-aircraft armament is one FL-3000N short range missile system with 8 rounds. A 76 mm main gun based on a Russian AK-176 is mounted forward. 2 triple torpedo tubes are mounted for ASW operations. Type 056 is the first Chinese warship with modular design, which makes it cover the roles from OPV to multi-role frigate. The PLAN used versions may include patrol type, ASW type, ASuW type, AAW type and commander type; while the export versions can be quite differently fitted according to consumer's requirement. For the moment, at least 3 variants of Type 056 for export exist with the same design of hull but varying bridge designs and armament layouts. A total of 20 corvettes were initially planned, but it was expected that anywhere up to 60 corvettes could be eventually brought into active service with the PLAN.

Originally, there were 2 variants of the Jiangdao-class in PLAN service - Type 056 and Type 056A. The main difference between the 2 variants is the addition of towed passive sonar line array and towed active variable depth sonar on Type 056A, giving this variant a significant ASW capability. The breakdown of numbers of the 2 variants is 22 Type 056 and 50 Type 056A, totaling 72 vessels across the 2 variants. All 22 of the original Type 056 have been retired from the PLAN and have been transferred to the Chinese Coast Guard (CCG). This move is expected to significantly boost Chinese Coast Guard capabilities. All 50 of the Type 056A have been commissioned and remain active in PLAN service.

== Missile boats, submarine chasers and gunboats ==
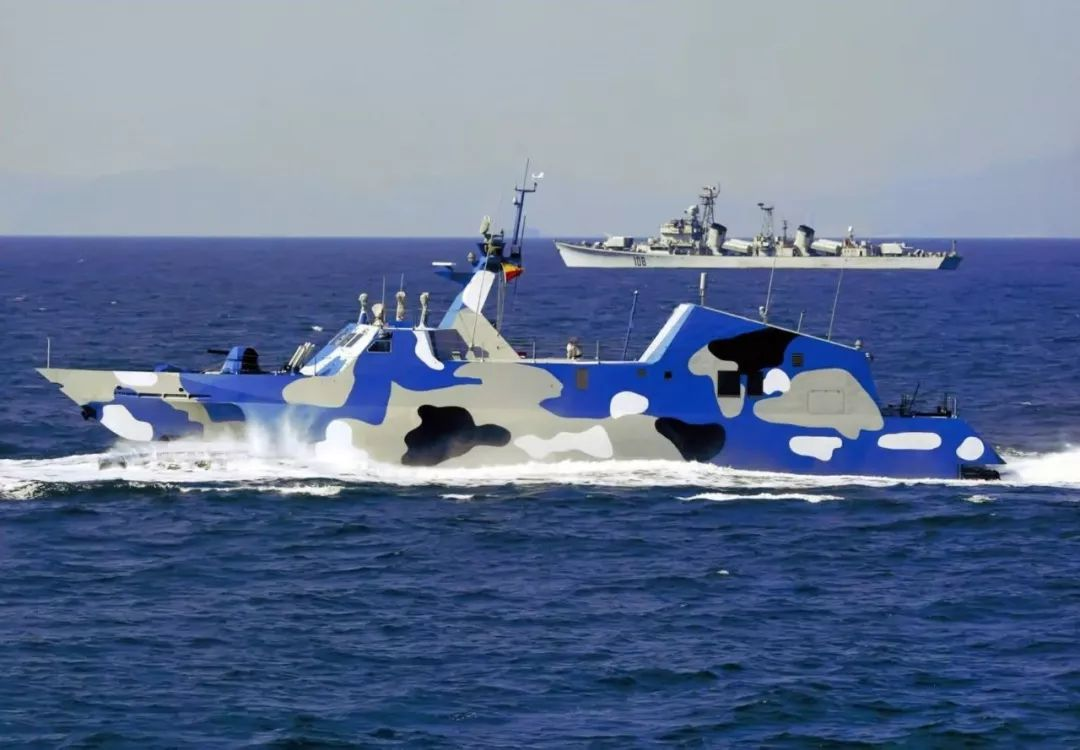
Type 22 missile boat

With increasing acquisition of destroyers, submarines, frigates and auxiliary support assets, missile and gun boats mostly disappeared from the PLAN fleet, with numbers reduced dramatically. However new classes of missile attack boats continue to be built to replace older types:

- Type 22 missile boat (NATO designation Houbei-class) - 60 in active service
- Type 037II missile boat (NATO designation Houjian-class) - 5 in active service
- Type 037IG missile boat (NATO designation Houxin-class) - 8 in active service
- Type 037I submarine chaser (NATO designation Haiqing-class) - 6 in active service (Type 037IS variant)
- Type 062I gunboat (NATO designation Shanghai III-class)

=== Development ===
The PLAN's main focus until the 1980s was a sharp emphasis on coastal defense and littoral warfare. This was influenced from early engagements where the Communist forces found the value of small maneuverable craft against larger, better armed but slower Nationalist ships. Early littoral craft in the PLAN's inventory included riverine craft and gun boats converted from various ships. This was later added to in the 1950s by Soviet-designed gun and torpedo attack craft. Such gun craft included the Kronstadt class heavily armed gun boats which served the PLAN until the 1980s. Soviet missile attack craft were later added to the fleet, including the Komar and Osa type fast attack missile craft. Although most littoral designs bore Soviet influence, there were quite a few indigenous designs or copies of Soviet-type craft. Hundreds of vessels were deployed by the fleet, serving as the backbone of the PLAN until a higher emphasis was placed upon bluewater naval operations. Despite availability of frigates and destroyers, the brunt of PLAN involvement in small-scale conflicts have been borne by the littoral forces. For instance, the various naval engagements between Chinese and Vietnamese naval forces were carried out by PLAN littoral craft.

Today missile boats compose of the Houjian, Houxin and Houbei classes. The 478-ton Houxin design is based on the Hainan-class hull, but with a redesigned superstructure, new systems, two automatic twin-37 mm guns and four YJ8 series anti-ship missiles. Around 28 are in service, built since the 1990s. A much more sophisticated and stealthy design is the 520-ton Houjian class. Main armament of the Houjian design is the twin 37 mm mount, two 30 mm twin turrets, and six YJ8 series anti-ship missiles.

The latest generation missile attack craft is the 220X (Houbei) design. Seen since 2005, its most distinctive feature is its trimaran hull that can achieve maximum wave piercing performance at high speeds. The stealthy design has two missile-houses, that can possibly be fitted with various ordnance. Eight missiles of the YJ83 anti-ship missiles are believed to be carried, as well as a single AK630 CIWS for self-defense. Four hulls emerged by 2005, with another eight to twelve others being constructed as of 2006.

Submarine chasers are plentiful in the PLAN and serve to screen China's territorial waters against submarine incursions. The Hainan class has proven itself to be a reliable design in many roles. Its main armament is two twin 57 mm guns, and two 25 mm AAA. The Hainan is also armed with anti-submarine multi-barrelled rockets and depth charges. There is provision for the fitment of four YJ8 series anti-ship missiles as well. The Haiqing class is a second generation improvement over the Hainan, with redesigned superstructure, automatic 37 mm AA guns and newer generation sonars and ASW equipment.

== Mine countermeasures ==
The People's Liberation Army Navy operates three mine countermeasure classes and a single mine layer class:

- Type 081 mine countermeasure vessel (NATO designation Wochi-class) - 10 in active service.
- Type 082II mine countermeasure vessel (NATO designation Wozang-class) - 2 in active service.
- Type 082 mine countermeasure vessel (NATO designation Wosao-class) - 17 in active service.

=== Development ===
Despite the extensive use of mines as a strategically important defensive and offensive weapon, the PLAN operates only a small number of mine warfare ships. These boats comprised mine-laying and mine-sweeping types. The PLAN operates a single Wolei class mine-layer. This ship was commissioned in 1988 and displaces 2,300 tons full load. It can carry and lay up to 300 mines. There is little need of a dedicated mine-laying type however, as most PLA surface and submarine combatants can lay minefields.

Minesweepers have served the PLAN since its founding. Currently two new classes of minesweeper have emerged since the late 1980s (Type 082 and Type 082II) and a single class since the 2000s (Type 081). Coastal minesweeping is primarily conducted by the Type 082 class. Blue-water minesweeping is fulfilled by the Type 082II and Type 081 classes.

== Fleet replenishment ==
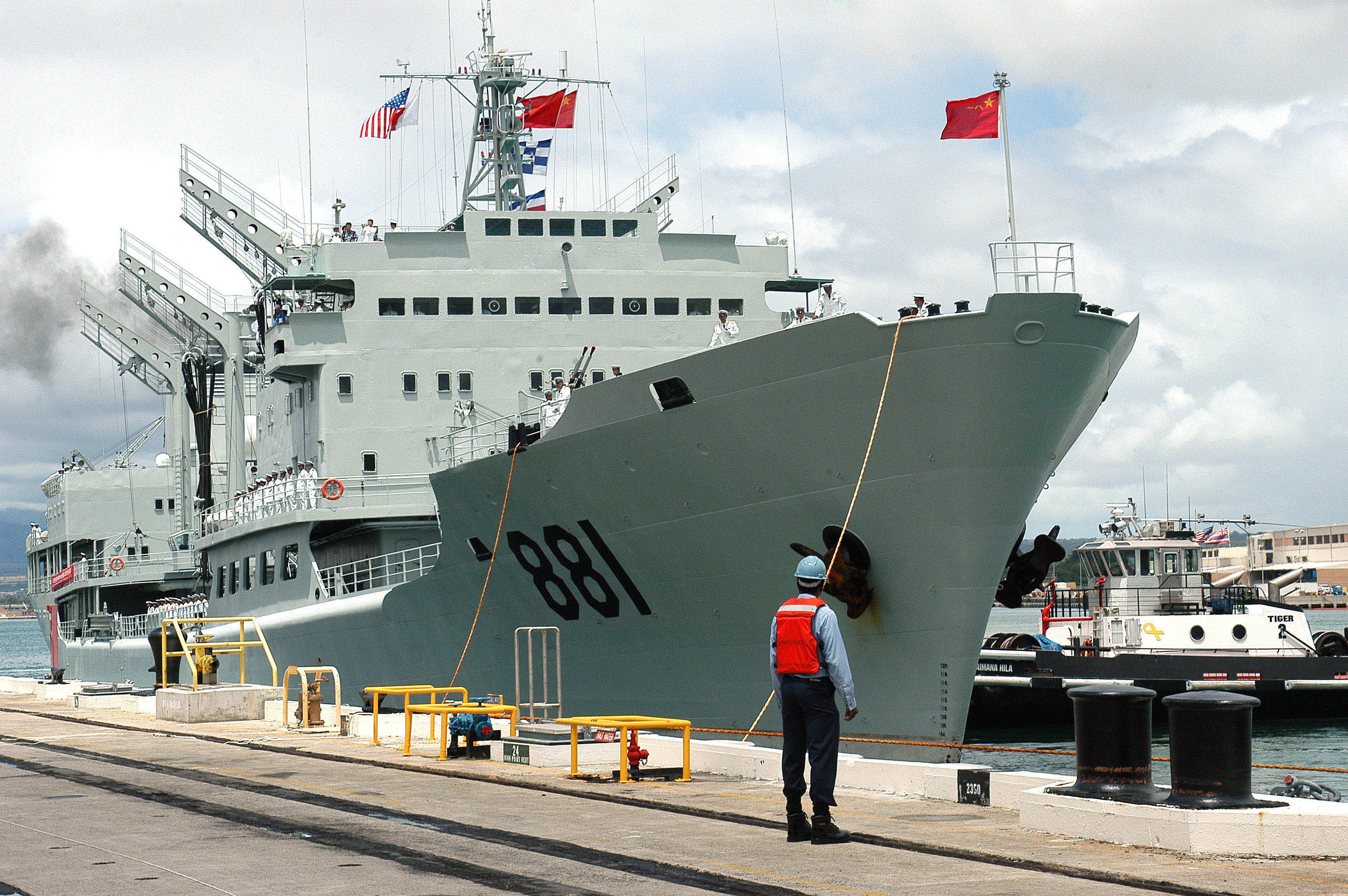
Type 905 replenishment ship (Fuqing-class)

Fleet replenishment has been an expanding element in PLAN auxiliaries. The PLAN view the need of replenishment ships as vital for blue water fleet operations:

- Type 901 fast combat support ship (NATO designation Fuyu-class) - 2 in active service, 1 under construction.
- Type 903 replenishment ship (NATO designation Fuchi-class) - 9 in active service (2 Type 903, 7 Type 903A).
- Type 904 general stores issue ship (NATO designation Dayun-class) - 4 in active service (1 Type 904, 1 Type 904A, 2 Type 904B).
- Type 908 replenishment ship (NATO designation Fusu-class) - 1 in active service.

=== Development ===
Since the 1970s, underway replenishment has been widely practiced by destroyer and frigate combatants. In many overseas visits, a tanker has traditionally accompanied the visiting ship. The first replenishment ships built for the dedicated task of fleet refueling were the Fuqing-class replenishment ship, of which two remain in service. The next fleet replenishment vessel was purchased from Russia in the 1990s, being the single Nancang (Fusu-class). This ship is significantly superior to the Fuqing-class in terms of refueling systems and the storage capacity. Two new hulls of the indigenous Fuchi-class were commissioned into service by 2005. With five ships (and possibly a sixth vessel), the PLAN's ability to operate further away from home has been significantly enhanced. The demands of modern-day warfare has meant that logistic support ships in the navy are becoming vital.

== Auxiliaries ==
The PLAN operates a very large number and variety of auxiliary vessels that are capable of supporting fleet and military operations both in a coastal and ocean theatres of war. PLAN auxiliary vessels are present in all three fleets, stationed in many naval bases and have increasingly exercised frequently alongside combatants. PLAN auxiliaries include tugboats, freighters, submarine tenders, research, survey ships, missile and satellite monitoring platforms, ice breakers, repair and communications, electronic warfare and monitoring, transport and training ships. Unlike warships of PLAN that are named per Naval Vessels Naming Regulation which many PLAN auxiliaries do not follow, but instead, they are designated by a combination of two Chinese characters followed by a two or three-digit number. The first Chinese character denotes which Chinese fleet the ship is service with, with East (Dong, 东) for East Sea Fleet, North (Bei, 北) for North Sea Fleet, and South (Nan, 南) for South Sea Fleet. The second Chinese character is for hull classification, such as Barge (Bo, 驳) for barge, Survey (Ce, 测) for survey vessel, Oil (You, 油) for oil tanker, Repair (Xiu, 修) for repair ship, Rescue (Jiu, 救) for rescue ship, Transport (Yun, 运) for transport & cargo ship, Tuo (tug, 拖) for tugboat, Water (Shui, 水) for water tanker, etc. When auxiliaries are reassigned to a different fleet, their pennant number would change accordingly. Some PLAN naval auxiliaries perform multiple functions and thus are referenced multiple times differently under various hull classifications. Furthermore, when PLAN auxiliaries are tasked to perform certain civilian missions such as in support of civilian research or construction projects, they are sometimes temporarily assigned different pennant numbers for the duration of those missions, thus making the accurate assessment of PLAN auxiliary fleet rather difficult.

In addition, some PLAN auxiliaries especially research vessels are jointly funded by other civilian agencies of Chinese government, and frequently conduct missions for these civilian agencies/departments, just like the way Protezione Civile funded Italian San Giorgio-class amphibious transport dock (LPD) of the Italian navy, and thus also performs disaster relief missions in addition to military operations. When these jointly owned and/or funded PLAN naval auxiliaries are subject to civilian agencies/departments & perform missions for them, they are often assigned a different pennant number & name, just as in some cases of PLAN naval auxiliaries are sometimes assigned different pennant numbers when performing certain civilian missions, thus making the accurate count of the PLAN auxiliary fleet even more complicated and difficult. Therefore, list provided here is seldom up-to-date. The following is a list of auxiliaries thought to be in service with the PLAN as of 2014–2015, but please note that it is a work in progress and often may not yet be complete and up to date.

Hospital ships

- 1 Type 920 hospital ship (NATO designation Anwei-class)
- 1 Chinese medical evacuation ship Zhuanghe (NATO designation unknown)
- 1 Qiongsha-class ambulance transport (NATO designation Qiongsha-class)

Icebreakers

- 2 Type 272 icebreaker (NATO designation Yanrao-class)

Barracks ship

- 1 Chinese barracks ship Xu Xiake (NATO designation Daguan-class)

Troop transport/ferry & cargo

- 5 Qiongsha-class cargo ship (NATO designation Qiongsha-class)
- 1 Beidiao 990

Training ships

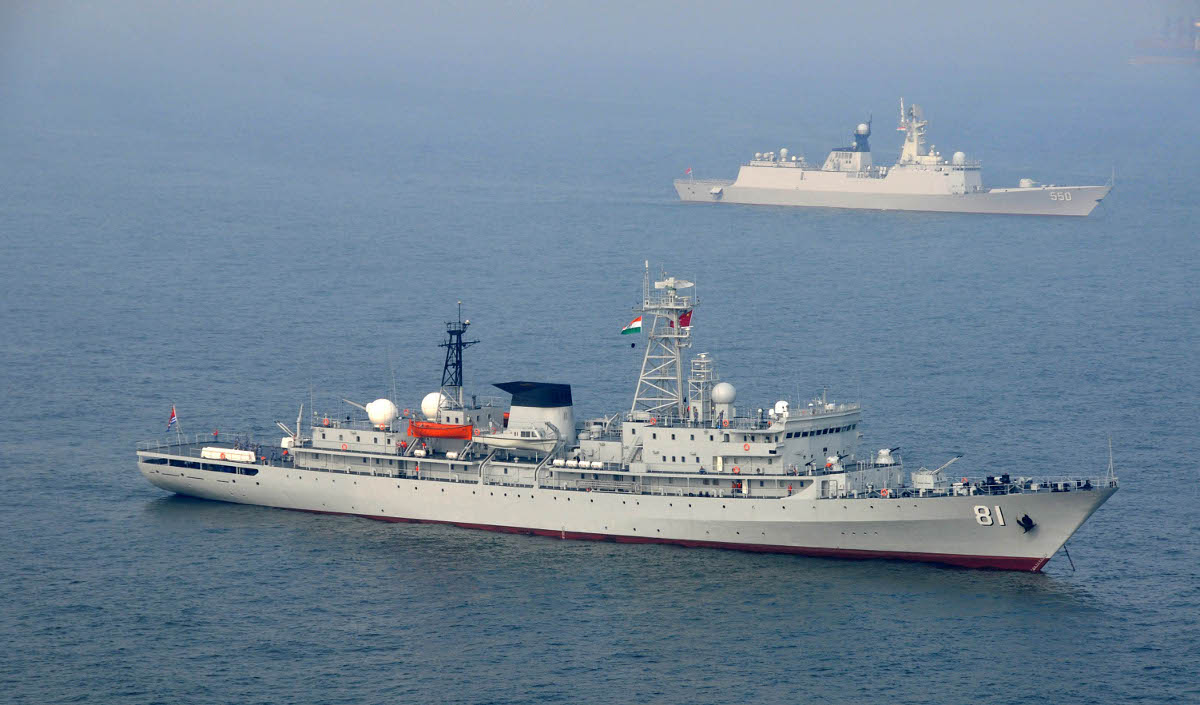
Type 679 training ship (Daxing-class)

- 1 Type 680 training ship (NATO designation Dadu-class)
- 1 Type 679 training ship (NATO designation Daxin-class)
- 1 Type 0891A training ship (NATO designation Dashi-class)
- 2 Type 053 frigate (NATO designation Jianghu-class) - (2 Type 053H1G)

Cargo transport

- 3 Yantai-class (NATO designation Yantai-class)
- 5 Type 081 cargo ship (NATO designation Hongqi-class)
- 13 Danlin-class cargo ship (NATO designation Danlin-class)
- 4 Dandao-class (NATO designation Dandao-class)
- 2 Galați-class cargo ship (NATO designation Galați-class)

Coastal oil tankers

- 9 Leizhou-class tanker (NATO designation Leizhou-class)
- 8 Fulin-class oil tanker (NATO designation Fulin-class)
- 2 Shengli-class oil tanker (NATO designation Shengli-class)
- 7 Fuzhou-class tanker (NATO designation Fuzhou-class)
- 3 Jinyou-class oil tanker (NATO designation Jinyou-class)

Ballistic missile tracking

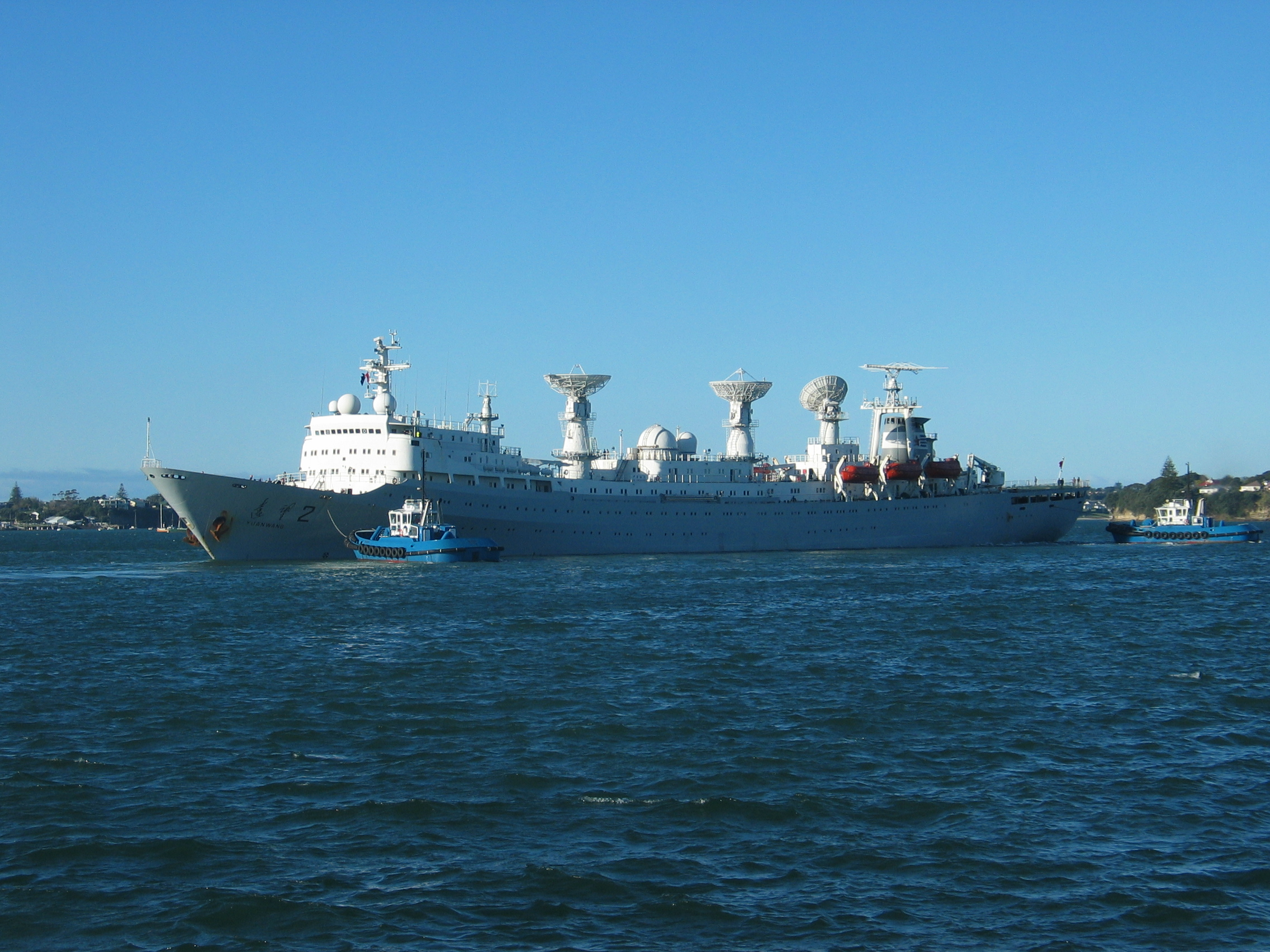
Yuan Wang-class ballistic missile tracking ship

- 6 Yuan Wang-class tracking ship (NATO designation Yuanwang-class)

Intelligence gathering

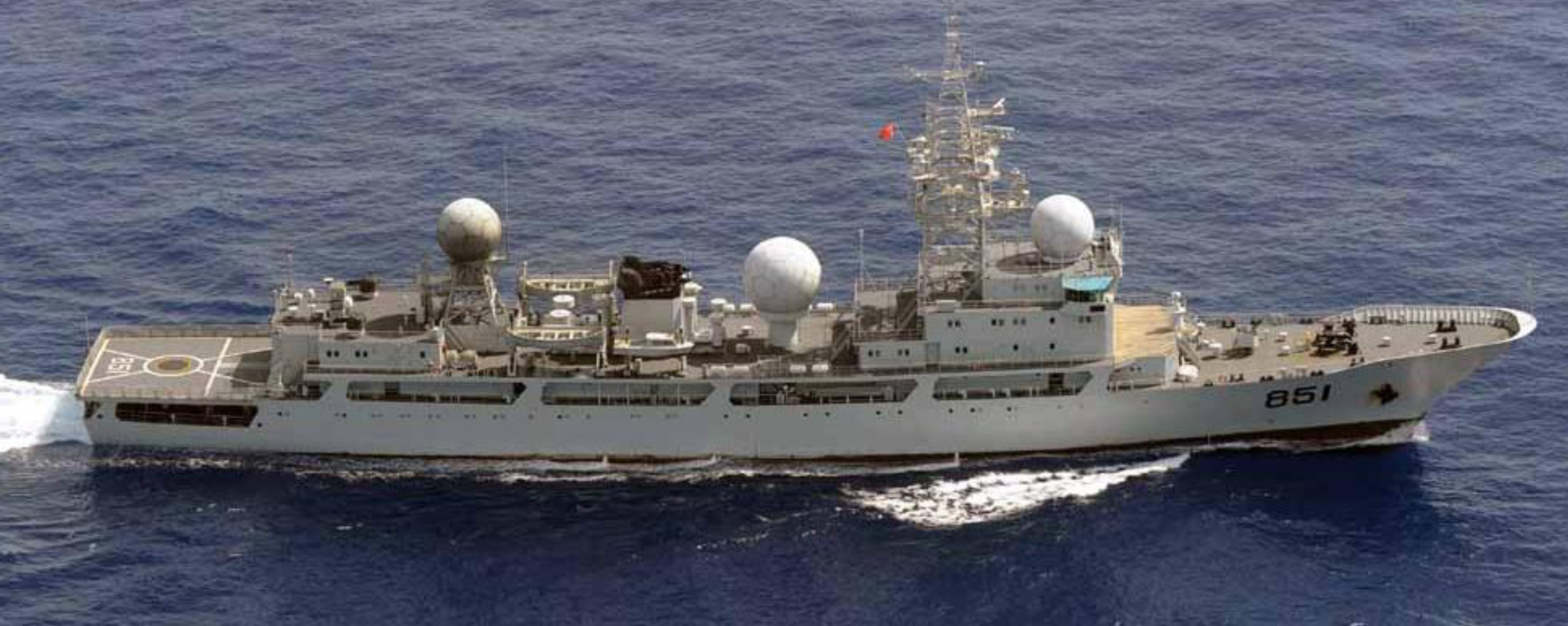
Type 815 spy ship (Dondiao-class)

- 1 Type 813 spy ship (NATO designation unknown)
- 1 Type 814A spy ship (NATO designation Dadie-class)
- 6 Type 815 spy ship (NATO designation Dondiao-class)

Oceanographic surveillance ships

- 2 Type 595 ocean surveillance ship (NATO designation unknown)
- 1 Type 639 oceanographic surveillance ship (NATO designation unknown)
- 3 Type 927 acoustic surveillance ships

Oceanographic research, meteorological and hydrographic survey ships

- 1 Chinese oceanographic research ship Xiangyanghong 5 (NATO designation unknown)
- 1 Type 645 oceanographic research ship (NATO designation unknown)
- 8 Type 625 research vessel (NATO designation unknown)
- 5 Type 614 research vessel (NATO designation unknown)
- 5 Type 635 hydrographic survey ship (NATO designation Yanlai-class)
- 6 Type 636 hydrographic survey ship (NATO designation unknown)
- 1 Type 988 hydrographic survey ship (NATO designation unknown)

Submarine support

- 1 Type 930 submarine rescue ship (NATO designation Hudong-class)
- 3 Type 946 submarine rescue ship (NATO designation Dazhou, Dadong-class)
- 3 Type 925 submarine support ship (NATO designation Dajiang-class)
- 3 Type 926 submarine support ship (NATO designation Dalao-class)
- 1 Type 648 repair ship (NATO designation unknown)

Torpedo trials/retriever

- 1 Type 906 torpedo trials craft (NATO designation unknown)
- 1 Type 907A torpedo trials craft (NATO designation unknown)
- 7 Type 917 torpedo retriever (NATO designation unknown)

Weapons trials

- 3 Type 909 weapon trials ship (NATO designation Wuhu-B-class)

Sonar trials

- 1 Chinese sonar trials ship Beidiao 993 (NATO designation Beidiao-class)

Experimental ships

- Chinese target ship Experiment 216 (NATO designation unknown)

Rescue and salvage

- 6 Type 922 rescue and salvage ship (NATO designation Dalang-class)
- 2 Type 917 rescue and salvage ship (NATO designation unknown)

Dive tender

- 2 Type 904 dive tender (NATO designation unknown)

Tug boats

- 4 Tuozhong-class (NATO designation Tuozhong-class)
- 1 Daozha-class (NATO designation Tuozhong-class)
- 15 Type 802 tug (NATO designation Gromovoy-class)
- 3 Type 830 tug (NATO designation unknown)
- 18 Type 837 tug (NATO designation Hujiu-class)
- 19 Type 852 tug (NATO designation Roslavl-class)

Degaussing & deperming

- 2 Type 911 degaussing/deperming ship (NATO designation unknown)
- 8 Type 912 degaussing/deperming ship (NATO designation unknown)

Cable laying

- 1 Type 890 cable layer (NATO designation Youzheng-class)
- 7 Type 991 cablelayer (NATO designation Youdian-class)

Buoy tenders

- 6 Type 744 buoy tender (NATO designation Yannan-class)
- 1 Type 999 buoy tender (NATO designation unknown)

== Nomenclature ==
Ships of PLAN are named per Naval Vessels Naming Regulation (中国海军舰艇命名条例) that was first issued by the Central Military Commission (CMC) on 3 November 1978, and subsequently revised 7 July 1986.

== See also ==
- People's Liberation Army Navy Submarine Force
- List of active People's Liberation Army Navy ships
