= Beidiao 991 =

Ship

History

PRC
- Name: Beidiao 991
- Namesake: North Investigation 991
- Builder: CSIC
- Commissioned: April 2008
- In service: 2008
- Homeport: Dalian

General characteristics
- Type: Multipurpose research ship (AGE)
- Displacement: 1,441 long tons (1,464 t)
- Length: 64 m (210 ft 0 in)
- Beam: 23 m (75 ft 6 in)
- Installed power: 2800 kW
- Propulsion: Marine Diesel
- Speed: 11 kt
- Range: 1500 nm
- Endurance: 7 days
- Complement: 32
- Electronic warfare & decoys: None

Chinese Research Ship Beidiao 991 is a research ship that has served both in civilian use and in the People's Liberation Army Navy (PLAN). It was built in the People’s Republic of China (PRC). This ship has the NATO reporting name Kandao (Chinese: 勘岛), meaning Surveying Island.

== Design ==
The steel-hulled Beidiao 991 adopts a Small-waterplane-area twin hull design, with a 2800 kW Integrated electric propulsion (IEP). It is the first ship with a displacement greater than one thousand tons to adopt an IEP in China. Research activities are conducted on the 120 square meter afterdeck and the five onboard labs (two on port, two on starboard, and one at the stern). The ship is equipped with a galley, conference room, command center, and various equipment for different scientific research missions, such as hydrographic, oceanographic, geologic and acoustic surveys.

Initial service proved unsatisfactory: when operating in high seas. The ship suffered from excessive vibration that generated enough noise to prevent onboard scientific research equipment from working properly. Fuel and fresh water reserves were inadequate, causing a need for frequent replenishment.

The ship went through a major upgrade to resolve these issues, which resulted in a Type 639 oceanographic surveillance ship that is forty percent larger with displacement reaching fifteen hundred tons.

Type	NATO designation	Pennant No.	Name (English)	Name (Chinese)	Commissioned	Displacement	Fleet	Status
Beidiao 991 multipurpose experimental ship (AGE)	Kandao class	Bei-Diao 991	North Investigation 991	北调 991	April 2008	1441 t	North Sea Fleets	Active
