= Naval Vessels Naming Regulation =

Chinese naming regulations for navy vessels

The Naval Vessels Naming Regulation (Chinese: 海军舰艇命名条例; pinyin: Hǎijūn Jiàntǐng Mìngmíng Tíaolì) is the Chinese People's Liberation Army Navy's regulation for naming its vessels. The regulation was published on 18 November 1978, and updated on 10 July 1986 and in 2022.

== Naming Convention ==
=== Surface Combatants ===
Type	Namesakes	Examples
Aircraft carriers and amphibious assault ships	Province-level administrative divisions	Liaoning, Sichuan
Destroyers	Provincial capitals, sub-provincial cities, large cities, and prefecture-level divisions associated with the party and military	Nanchang, Lhasa, Xiamen
Frigates	Other prefecture-level divisions and county-level divisions associated with the party and military	Zhoushan, Xianning
Submarine chasers, missile boats, mine warfare vessels	County-level divisions	Qufu, Liuyang
Amphibious warfare ships	Mountains	Kunlun Shan, Taihang Shan

=== Submarines ===
Type	Namesakes	Examples
Nuclear submarines	Changzheng (Chinese: 长征; pinyin: Chángzhēng; lit. 'Long March') followed by a serial number	Long March 21
Conventional submarines	Changcheng (Chinese: 长城; pinyin: Chángchéng; lit. 'Great Wall') followed by a serial number	Great Wall 346

=== Auxiliaries ===
Type	Namesakes	Examples
Reconnaissance ships	Celestial objects	Uranus
Underwater acoustic monitoring ships	Rivers	N/A
Rescue boats, repair ships, semi-submersibles and replenishment ships	Lakes	Weishanhu, Yinmahu
Oceanographic survey ships, research ships	Historical Chinese scientists	Zhu Kezhen
Training ships	Historical Chinese navigators, national heroes, or nouns and phrases with [maritime] symbolism	Zheng He, Qi Jiguang
Hospital ships	Symbolic nouns and phrases	Peace Ark
Other auxiliaries	The name of the operating area and function followed by a serial number	Nan-Yun 832, Dong-Bo 24

== See also ==
- List of ships of the People's Liberation Army Navy
