= 081 =

081 may refer to:

== Telephony ==
- 081, the telephone dialing code for the City of Naples and surroundings in Italy
- 081, a former dialling code for London, UK (1990–1995)
- 081, a telephone area code for mobile operators in Lebanon
- 081, a mobile phone prefix code in Thailand

== Other uses ==
- "081" (song), a 2025 single by Geolier
- 081, a character in Darling in the Franxx anime series
- Type 081 mine countermeasure vessel, a Chinese minesweeper/mine hunter
- Type 081 transport ship, a Chinese auxiliary ship
- Uncial 081, designation for Codex Tischendorfianus II, a 6th-century New Testament manuscript
