= Yanding-class transport =

First transport ships built by China

Class overview
- Builders: Wuchang Shipyard
- Operators: People's Liberation Army Navy
- Preceded by: None
- Succeeded by: Danlin-class cargo ship
- Built: 1954 - 1956
- In commission: 1957
- Planned: 4
- Building: 4
- Completed: 4
- Active: 0
- Retired: 4
- Scrapped: 4

General characteristics
- Class & type: Yanding class
- Type: Transport (AP)
- Displacement: 275 long tons (279 t)
- Length: 31.5 m (103 ft)
- Beam: 7 m (23 ft)
- Draught: 2.5 m (8.2 ft)
- Propulsion: 300 hp (220 kW)
- Speed: 10 knots (12 mph; 19 km/h)
- Range: 3800 nm
- Complement: 18
- Armament: Two 14.5 mm machine guns (I x 2)

Yanding-class transport (AP) is the first transport built in the People’s Republic of China (PRC) for the People's Liberation Army Navy (PLAN). A total of 4 ships were completed by Wuchang Shipyard, and all of them were based on fishing trawlers. Powered by a 3D12 diesel engine, all 4 ships served in the East Sea Fleet, and although its successor Danlin-class cargo ship has entered service in the early 1960s, Yanding class ships remained in service until they were finally retired by 1989.

Name (English)	Name (Han 中文)	Displacement (t)	Commissioned	Status
Dong-Yun 456	东运 456	275	1957	Retired
Dong-Yun 520	东运 520	275	1957	Retired
Dong-Yun 523	东运 523	275	1957	Retired
Dong-Yun 666	东运 666	275	1957	Retired
