= Type 944 buoy tender =

Type of ship

History

PRC
- Ordered: 2010s
- Awarded: 2010s
- Completed: 2017 onward
- Commissioned: 2017 onward
- Status: Active

Class overview
- Operators: People's Liberation Army Navy
- Preceded by: Type 744 buoy tender
- Built: 2010s
- In service: 2017 onward
- In commission: 2017 onward
- Completed: 5
- Active: 5

General characteristics
- Class & type: Yanni-class
- Type: Buoy tender
- Displacement: 2,300 long tons (2,300 t)
- Length: 73.3 m (240 ft 6 in)
- Beam: 14 m (45 ft 11 in)
- Draft: 4 m (13 ft 1 in)
- Depth: 6.2 m (20 ft 4 in)
- Propulsion: Marine Diesel
- Electronic warfare & decoys: None
- Armour: None
- Aircraft carried: None
- Aviation facilities: None

Type 944A is a type of very little known buoy tender built in the People’s Republic of China (PRC) for the People's Liberation Army Navy (PLAN), and it received the NATO reporting name as Yanni class. There are two versions of Type 944 buoy tender: civilian version Type 944 and the military version Type 944A for the Chinese navy, and the two differ in the different types of cranes installed in the bow, and some of the portholes on the superstructure, as well as the different shapes of bulwark at the stern. Specification:

- Length (m): 73.3
- Beam (m): 14
- Depth (m): 6.2
- Draft (m): 4
- Displacement (t): 2300
- Speed (kt): 15

== Ships ==
Type	NATO designation	Pennant No.	Name (English)	Name (Han 中文)	Commissioned	Displacement	Fleet	Status
Type 944	Yanni-class	Hai-Xun 160	Sea Patrol 160	海巡 160	Jun 29, 2019	2,300 t	China Maritime Safety Administration	Active
Type 944	Yanni-class	Hai-Xun 173	Sea Patrol 173	海巡 173	July 22, 2020	2,300 t	China Maritime Safety Administration	Active
Type 944A	Yanni-class	Bei-Biao 989	North Buoy 989	北标 989	September 4, 2018	2,300 t	North Sea Fleet	Active
Type 944A	Yanni-class	Dong-Biao 265	North Buoy 265	东标 265	January 24, 2017	2,300 t	East Sea Fleet	Active
Type 944A	Yanni-class	Nan-Biao 467	South Buoy 467	南标 467	June 2017	2,300 t	South Sea Fleet	Active
