= Darong-class transport =

Chinese naval auxiliary ship class

History

PRC
- Status: Active

Class overview
- Operators: People's Liberation Army Navy
- Preceded by: Qiongsha-class cargo ship
- Built: After 2000
- In service: After 2000
- In commission: After 2000
- Planned: 2+
- Completed: 2
- Active: 2

General characteristics
- Class & type: Darong
- Type: transport (AP) / troopship (APT)
- Displacement: 5,000 long tons (5,100 t)
- Length: 68 m (223 ft 1 in)
- Propulsion: Marine Diesel
- Sensors & processing systems: Navigation radar
- Electronic warfare & decoys: None
- Armament: Unarmed
- Armour: None
- Aircraft carried: None
- Aviation facilities: Helipad

Darong class transport (AP)/troopship (APT) is a class of auxiliary ship built in the People’s Republic of China (PRC) for the People's Liberation Army Navy (PLAN). Intended as a successor of Qiongsha-class cargo ship, the exact domestic Chinese type designation remains unknown, so this class is identified by its NATO reporting name Darong class. Specification:

Darong class in PLAN service is designated by a combination of two Chinese characters followed by a three-digit number. The second Chinese character is Yun (运), meaning transport in Chinese. The first Chinese character denotes which fleet the ship is service with, with East (Dong, 东) for East Sea Fleet, North (Bei, 北) for North Sea Fleet, and South (Nan, 南) for South Sea Fleet. However, the pennant numbers are subject to change due to the change of Chinese naval ships naming convention, or when units are transferred to different fleets. As of 2022, a total of two ships have been identified:

Type	NATO designation	Pennant No.	Name (English)	Name (Han 中文)	Commissioned	Displacement	Fleet	Status
Darong class transport (AP) / troopship (APT)	Darong class	Nan-Yun 830	South Transport 830	南运 830	?	5,000 t	South Sea Fleet	Active
Darong class transport (AP) / troopship (APT)	Darong class	Nan-Yun 831	South Transport 831	南运 831	?	5,000 t	South Sea Fleet	Active
