= Type 988 oceanographic surveillance ship =

Type of Chinese survey vessel

Type 988 oceanographic surveillance ship is a type of Chinese survey vessel that is in service with both the People's Liberation Army Navy (PLAN) and Chinese civilian establishments.

Type 988 oceanographic surveillance ship is designed by the 1st Directorate of the 708th Institute of China State Shipbuilding Corporation (CSSC), which is more commonly known as China Shipbuilding and Oceanic Engineering Design Academy. From December 1965 through November 1975, a total of four ships were completed by Wuchang Shipyard, and all of them went into civilian service. The last ship built by Guangzhou Shipyard International in 1972 went into service with PLAN and had name Hai-Sheng (海声, meaning Oceanic Acoustic) 582. Type 988 is often deployed in conjunction with Type 595 ocean surveillance ship. Specifications:

- Length (m): 54
- Beam (m): 8.5
- Depth (m): 3.7
- Draft (m): 2.25
- Displacement (t): 590
- Speed (kt): 15
- Propulsion: two 301Z-301Y diesel engines @ 809 kW (1100 hp) each

Type	Pennant #	Builder	Commissioned	Status
988	Hai-Sheng 582	Guangzhou Shipyard International	1972	Active
