= Danlin-class cargo ship =

Chinese cargo ship

Class overview
- Operators: People's Liberation Army Navy
- Preceded by: Yanding-class transport / cargo ship
- Succeeded by: Dandao-class cargo ship

General characteristics
- Class & type: Danlin class
- Type: Transport (AP) / cargo ship (AK)
- Displacement: 1,290 long tons (1,310 t)
- Length: 60 m (200 ft)
- Beam: 9 m (30 ft)
- Draft: 4 m (13 ft)
- Propulsion: 750 hp (560 kW)
- Speed: 14 knots (26 km/h; 16 mph)
- Complement: 35
- Sensors & processing systems: Navigation radar
- Armament: twin 37 mm gun x 1, twin 14.5 mm machine gun x 2
- Armour: None

The Danlin-class cargo ship is a class of Chinese cargo ship that is in service with People's Liberation Army Navy (PLAN). Danlin-class cargo ships are the armed version of its unarmed sister ship in civilian service, and both entered service between 1960 – 1962. Specifications:

- Displacement (t): 1290
- Length (m): 60
- Beam (m): 9
- Draft (m): 4
- Speed (kt): 14 kt
- Propulsion: 750 hp Type 6DRN 30/50 diesel x 1
- Armament: twin 37 mm gun x 1, twin 14.5 mm machine gun x 2
- Radar: 1 former-USSR Fine Curve or Chinese Type 756 navigational radar
- Crew: 35

== Dandao class ==
Class overview
- Operators: People's Liberation Army Navy
- Preceded by: Danlin-class cargo ship
- Succeeded by: Galati-class cargo ship

General characteristics
- Class & type: Dandao class
- Type: Transport (AP) / cargo ship (AK)
- Displacement: 1,600 long tons (1,600 t)
- Length: 65.7 m (216 ft)
- Beam: 12.5 m (41 ft)
- Draft: 4 m (13 ft)
- Propulsion: Marine diesel
- Speed: 12 knots (22 km/h; 14 mph)
- Complement: 40
- Sensors & processing systems: Navigation radar
- Electronic warfare & decoys: None
- Armament: twin 37 mm gun x 2, twin 14.5 mm machine gun x 2
- Armour: None

The Dandao class is the successor of earlier Danlin class, and it is an enlarged version of Danlin class. A total of seven ships were completed and entered service with PLAN in the late 1970s, three of which were built as coastal tanker versions. Although intended to be succeeded by Galați-class cargo ship, Dandao and Danlin class cargo ships remained active for a long time, serving alongside their successor. Specifications:

- Displacement (t): 1600
- Length (m): 65.7
- Beam (m): 12.5
- Draft (m): 4
- Speed (kt): 12
- Propulsion: 1 diesel engine
- Armament: twin 37 mm x 4, twin 14.5 mm x 4
- Radar: 1 former-USSR Fine Curve or Chinese Type 756 navigational radar
- Crew: 40
