= Type 852 tug =

Chinese tug ship

The type 852 tug is the Chinese version of the formerly Soviet Roslavl tug that has been developed for the People's Liberation Army Navy (PLAN). The differences between the Chinese version and the original Soviet version are minor, mainly in the modification of living quarters. For example, space used for milk storage has been converted for vegetable storage, and Russian-style ovens and stoves are replaced with Chinese types. An air conditioning system has been added for operation in warmer climates. These ships still remain active as of the early 2010s, despite their age. Ships in the type 852 series in PLAN service are labeled with a combination of two Chinese characters followed by a three-digit number. The second Chinese character is Tuo (拖), meaning tug in Chinese, because these ships are tugs. The first Chinese character denotes which fleet the ship is in service with; for example, with East (Dong, 东) for East Sea Fleet, North (Bei, 北) for North Sea Fleet, and South (Nan, 南) for South Sea Fleet. However, the pennant numbers may have changed due to the change of Chinese naval ships naming convention. Specification:

- Length (m): 45.7
- Beam (m): 9.5
- Draft (m): 4.6
- Displacement (t): 670
- Speed (kn): 12
- Rang (nmi): 6000 @ 11 kn
- Crew: 28
- Propulsion: two diesel engines @ 1200 hp
- Armament: four 14.5 mm machine guns

Type	Pennant #	Status	Fleet
Type 852	Nan-Tuo 161	Active	South Sea Fleet
Type 852	Bei-Tuo 153	Active	North Sea Fleet
Type 852	Bei-Tuo 159	Active	North Sea Fleet
Type 852	Bei-Tuo 162	Active	North Sea Fleet
Type 852	Bei-Tuo 163	Active	North Sea Fleet
Type 852	Bei-Tuo 164	Active	North Sea Fleet
Type 852	Bei-Tuo 168	Active	North Sea Fleet
Type 852	Dong-Tuo 518	Active	East Sea Fleet
Type 852	Dong-Tuo 604	Active	East Sea Fleet
Type 852	Dong-Tuo 613	Active	East Sea Fleet
Type 852	Dong-Tuo 618	Active	East Sea Fleet
Type 852	Dong-Tuo 646	Active	East Sea Fleet
Type 852	Dong-Tuo 707	Active	East Sea Fleet
Type 852	Dong-Tuo 852	Active	East Sea Fleet
Type 852	Dong-Tuo 853	Active	East Sea Fleet
Type 852	Dong-Tuo 854	Active	East Sea Fleet
Type 852	Dong-Tuo 862	Active	East Sea Fleet
Type 852	Dong-Tuo 863	Active	East Sea Fleet
Type 852	Dong-Tuo 867	Active	East Sea Fleet
