= Chinese research ship Xiangyanghong 5 =

Chinese oceanographic research ship Xiangyanghong (向阳红, meaning facing the sun in red) 5 in service with the People's Liberation Army Navy (PLAN). In addition to performing oceanographic research duties, the most important mission of Xiangyanghong 5 is acting as a command ship for Chinese intercontinental ballistic missile trials in 1980.

Originally build as a Francesco Nullo class cargo ship by Paris Commune Shipyard in Poland, the predecessor of current day Stocznia Gdynia, the ship was launched in 1966 and purchased by the Guangzhou Ocean Shipping Co. Ltd. (广州远洋公司) subsidiary of COSCO and named as Changning (长宁). In 1970, it was decided to convert a cargo ship to oceanographic research ship in support of Project 718, the Chinese project of developing its own intercontinental ballistic missile. The design for conversion work was completed by China Ship and Maritime Engineering Design and Research Academy (中国船舶及海洋工程设计研究院). also more commonly known as the 708th Institute of CSSC. Work begun on June 1, 1970 at Guangzhou Shipyard International and was completed on December 20, 1972, costing ¥ 2,500,000. Changes included increasing ballast and fresh water storage, and equipment needed for scientific research, such as communication gears including fax machine. Various research labs were added and navigational system was upgraded. Because Changning was a cargo ship with only minimal crew, large personnel quarters were added to house hugely increased crew due to researchers assigned on board. Upon completion, the ship was renamed as Xiangyanghong 5 and was immediately put in use.

However, due to the political turmoil in China, namely, Cultural Revolution, each mission were relatively short and close to Chinese coast, because Chinese economy at the time could not provide sufficient support for prolonged missions further away from Chinese coastline. Prolonged mission finally became a reality after end of the Cultural Revolution, and majority of them were concentrated in 1977 and 1978, with the four longest missions spreading out between the two years. Experience gained from mission deployment mandated another major upgrade of the ship which begun in December 1978, with over 860 upgrades and modifications total. Guangzhou Shipyard International was once again selected as the primary contractor and work was completed on December 17, 1979. After this major upgrade, Xiangyanghong 5 was assigned to participate in Task 580, the transfer of Chinese intercontinental ballistic missile. Xiangyaonghong 5 also carried out many research missions to assist the selection of suitable test areas in the Pacific Ocean. In June 1980, Xiangyanghong 5 became the command ship for Chinese intercontinental ballistic missile trials. Xiangyanghong 5 still remains in service after decades of enlistment. Specification:

- Displacement (t): 14500
- Length (m): 152.6
- Width (m): 19.5
- Draft (m): 8.8
- Speed (kt): 16
- Range (nm): 15000
- Propulsion: 1 diesel engine @ 7200 hp*

Type	Name	Builder	Start	Commissioned	Status
Changning	Xiangyanghong 5	Guangzhou Shipyard International Co., Ltd.	Jun 1, 1970	Dec 20, 1972	Active
