= Type 595 ocean surveillance ship =

Chinese ocean surveillance ship

Type 595 ocean surveillance ship is the first purposely designed and purposely built ocean surveillance ship developed in China for its People's Liberation Army Navy (PLAN). Designed to replace earlier Shuguang class, Type 595 itself has been replaced by Type 639 in PLAN, but despite over four decades of service, this type of ship still remain active in civilian service, albeit on a much smaller scale.

The design of Type 595 mid-sized ocean surveillance ship was completed in May 1965 by the 708th Institute of China State Shipbuilding Corporation, which is also more commonly known as China Shipbuilding and Oceanic Engineering Design Academy (中国船舶及海洋工程设计研究) nowadays. Original plan was to have construction of this type of ship immediately follows the completion of design, but due to political turmoil in China, namely, Cultural Revolution, construction was delayed and it was not until nearly one and half a year later in September 1967, when construction of the first unit finally begun. Both units planned were completed by the early 1970s and entered service with PLAN. Type 595 is equipped with all electric drive auxiliary propulsion system at low speed to eliminate internal noise generated by the engine so that the sonar system onboard can work better in comparison to diesel engine. The ship are named as Xiangyanghong (向阳红, meaning facing the sun in red) series. Specification:

- Length (m): 65.22
- Length between perpendiculars (m): 58
- Depth (m): 4.8
- Beam (m): 10.2
- Draft (m): 3.6
- Displacement (t): 1165
- Max speed (kn): 15
- Cruise speed (kn): 12
- Range (nmi): 3000
- Crew: 82
- Main propulsion: two 8350Z-1 diesel engine @ 773 kW (1060 hp) each, @ 360 rpm
- Auxiliary propulsion: two 56 kW DC electric motor

Type	Name	Pennant #	Builder	Laid down	Commissioned	Status	Fleet
595	Xiangyanghong 4	S223	Jiangnan Shipyard	Sept 1967	1972	Active	Civilian service
595	Xiangyanghong 6	S485	Guangzhou Shipyard International	Jan 1969	1973	Retired	PLAN & civilian service
