= Type 912 degaussing/deperming ship =

Chinese auxiliary ship class

History

PRC
- Status: Active

General characteristics
- Type: Degaussing / deperming ship (ADG)
- Propulsion: Marine Diesel
- Sensors & processing systems: Navigation radar
- Electronic warfare & decoys: None
- Armament: Unarmed
- Armour: None
- Aircraft carried: None
- Aviation facilities: None

Type 912 degaussing/deperming ship (ADG) is a type of auxiliary ship built in the People's Republic of China (PRC) for the People's Liberation Army Navy (PLAN), and this class has several derivatives. As of 2022, Type 912 is the most numerous degaussing/deperming ship in PLAN, and the longest serving degaussing/deperming ships in PLAN, until its successor type 911 finally begun to appear in early 2010s.

== Origin ==
The origin of Type 912 rooted from the need to replace very first batch of degaussing/deperming ships in PLAN service, all of which were converted from other wooden hulled ships:

| Type | Pennant No. | Name (English) | Name (Han 中文) | Commissioned | Displacement | Fleet | Status |
|---|---|---|---|---|---|---|---|
| Ex-Soviet Navy ADG | Xiao-Ci 1 | Degaussing / deperming No. 1 | 消磁一号 | December 1950 | 300 t | North Sea Fleet (NSF) | Transferred from former-USSR @ Lushun naval base |
| Converted fishing vessels | 323 | Not named | Not named | December 1955 | ? t | South Sea Fleet (SSF) | Converted by SSF |
| Converted fishing vessels | 629 | Not named | Not named | December 1955 | ? t | East Sea Fleet (ESF) | Converted by ESF |
| Converted fishing vessels | 731 | Not named | Not named | December 1955 | ? t | East Sea Fleet | Converted by ESF |
| Converted fishing vessels | 744 | Not named | Not named | 1958 | ? t | North Sea Fleet | Converted @ Lushun naval base |
| Wooden hulled ADG | Xiao-Ci 951 | Degaussing / deperming No.951 | 消磁 951 | December 1960 | 200 t | South Sea Fleet | Original built by Huangpu Shipyard w/ Pennant # 429 |

Since most of the wooden hulled degaussing/deperming ships have already been in service for prolonged period of time prior to their conversion, and needed to be replaced, PLAN thus converted other steel hulled ships as their successors. Most units were converted from large infantry landing craft (LCIL) and a minesweeper Qiu-Feng (秋风 in Chinese, meaning Autumn Wind), which was a IJN No.1-class auxiliary minesweeper (MSA) No. 14 given to Republic of China on October 4, 1947, along with No. 19 and 22 as part of war reparations, and respectively entered Republic of China Navy (RoCN) as Minesweeping (Sao-Lei, or 扫雷 in Chinese) 201, 202, and 203 on May 1, 1948, after rearmed with US weaponry. During the Chinese Civil War, crew of RoCN Minesweeping 201 defected to the communists in the absence of the captain on February 17, 1949, with ship being renamed as Autumn Wind afterward, and also used as a training ship in addition to degaussing/deperming ship by PLAN, until its final retirement in 1976. The three LCILs were sold to China after World War II as surplus material for civilian use, such as custom patrol boats, and were taken over by PLAN, initially converted as minesweepers, but subsequently converted again to a degaussing/deperming ship.

| Type | Pennant No. | Name (English) | Name (Han 中文) | Commissioned | Displacement | Fleet | Status |
|---|---|---|---|---|---|---|---|
| Converted LCILs | Zhang-Dian | Zhangdian | 张店 | 1958 | 389 t | North Sea Fleet (NSF) | Converted @ Qingdao naval base |
| Converted LCILs | Pan-Long | Panlong | 蟠龙 | 1958 | 389 t | North Sea Fleet | Converted @ Qingdao naval base |
| Converted LCILs | Hai-Ci 802 | Sea Magnetism 802 | 海磁 802 | July 1965 | 389 t | East Sea Fleet (ESF) | Converted from minesweeper Zhoucun, w/ the pennant # later changed to C862. |
| Converted fishing vessel | Hai-Yu 16 | Sea Fishing 16 | 海渔 16 | 1966 | 400 t | South Sea Fleet (SSF) | Converted @ Guangzhou Shipyard |
| Converted minesweeper | Qiu-Feng | Autumn Wind | 秋风 | 1958 | ? t | East Sea Fleet | Converted from minesweeper & retained the same name, retired in 1976. Ex-RoCN Minesweeping 201, ex-IJN MSA No. 14. |

Molded after Soviet SR barges, these converted degaussing/deperming ships carried sixty KSM-type accumulator batteries providing ten-volt external and a hundred ten-volt or two hundred twenty-volt for internal coils and cable reels for two hundred forty-millimeter diameter cables. Additional equipment needed for degaussing/deperming duties such as magnetometer to measure horizontal and vertical magnetic field is also carried on board.

== Yan Fang class ==
PLAN’s first attempt of building steel hulled degaussing/deperming ships proved that these ships were only capable of operating in the coastal waters, just like their wooden hulled predecessors, and to support operation further away from shore in the littoral zone, sea-going degaussing/deperming vessels that are capable of operating in both coastal and littoral waters were needed. Decision was made to convert fishing trawlers for this purpose, based on the fact that these fishing trawlers were successfully deployed in both coastal and littoral waters in fishing. A total of two were converted in the early 1960s, but based on the deployment experience, the result was far from satisfactory because these fishing trawlers are simply too small to carry out the required missions effectively. By 1990, both units were retired from service. Specification:

- Standard displacement (t): 110
- Full displacement (t): 125
- Length (m): 31
- Width (m): 6.1
- Draft (m): 1.8
- Propulsion: 2 Chinese copy of Soviet 3-D-6 diesel engines @ 600 hp
- Speed (kn): 9
- Crew: 9

== Type 601 ==
Yan Fang class and earlier degaussing/deperming vessels built in China had the inherit shortcoming because both were constructed of steel, and this would interfere with performing their designated duties. One of the methods attempted to eliminate such shortcoming, was to construct degaussing/deperming vessel out of wood. Type 601 degaussing/deperming vessel is the result of such attempt. Built by Huangpu Shipyard of Guangzhou Shipyard International, the ship entered service in the early 1960s as Sea Magnetic (Hai-Ci or Haici, 海磁) 951. Type 601 retired in the early 1990s.

== Yerka class ==
Only a single Type 601 degaussing/deperming ship was built, because China found solution to reduce the magnetism of steel hull, and subsequent classes are constructed from steel. Yerka class degaussing/deperming ship is the fourth degaussing/deperming ship in Chinese service, and it is intended to replace all previous three classes. Built by Hudong-Zhonghua Shipbuilding, these ship entered service from 1966 thru 1968. However, due to the political turmoil in China at the time, namely, Cultural Revolution, production came to a complete stop after only two units were constructed. Furthermore, these two completed units were plagued with problems as disruption caused by the political turmoil. As a result, program was subsequently cancelled. Specification:

- Length (m): 47
- Width (m): 7.5
- Draft (m): 2.2
- Displacement (t): 395
- Speed (kn): 18
- Range: 3000 nmi @ 11 kn
- Crew: 55
- Propulsion: 2 Chinese copy of Kolomna 9-D-8 diesel engine @ 2000 hp
- Armament: twin 37 mm gun x 1 and 2 twin 14.5 mm machine guns

== Type 912 ==
Experience gained (and/or also lesson learned) from wooden and steel hulled units, Type 601, Yan Fang and Yerka classes resulted in Type 912, which like its predecessor Yerka class, is also based on experience gained from Type 6610 minesweeper, where reduction of steel hull magnetism is critical in countering magnetic mines. Instead of transferring the knowledge gained to a brand new class that is totally different, as in the case of Yerka class, decision was made to construct a degaussing/deperming ship directly based on Type 6610 minesweeper to reduce risks and cost. The approach proved to be successful and many derivatives followed. A total of two Type 912 ships were built and the one in service with North Sea Fleet and remain active to date, and the other went into service with South Sea Fleet but eventually retired and replaced by a newer Type 912IIIA degaussing/deperming ship, using the same Pennant number, which in turned, replaced by newer Type 911. Type 912 is capable of providing degaussing/deperming service to ships up to 5000 tons. Type 912 has received NATO reporting name Yanbai class. Specifications:

- Length (m): 58
- Width (m): 8.8
- Draft (m): 3.5
- Standard displacement (t): 500
- Full displacement (t): 570
- Speed (kn): 16
- Range: 3500 nmi @ 8 kn
- Crew: 55 – 60
- Propulsion: 2 Chinese copy of Kolomna 9-D-8 diesel engine @ 2000 hp
- Armament: twin 37 mm gun x 1 and 2 twin 14.5 mm machine guns

== Type 912I ==
Type 912I is a very simple modification of the original Type 912, mainly as a stop gap measure for more advanced Type 912II design. However, due to Chinese policy of foreign military aid as first priority, Type 912II was cancelled to make room for Type 915, Type 916, and Type 918. When these foreign military aid programs were completed, further improvement Type 912III was already in place because subsequent decision was made to construct it in parallel with foreign military aid programs, and Type 912II never went beyond design stage. Only a single unit was of Type 912I was completed, serving in South Sea Fleet. Type 912I shares the same NATO reporting name Yanbai class with its predecessor Type 912.

== Type 915 ==
Type 915 is a variant of Type 912I built for North Vietnam as military aid. The main difference between Type 915 and Type 912I is the improvement of air conditioning system for tropical condition. Built by Huangpu Shipyard of Guangzhou Shipyard International, all units were delivered in 1974.

== Type 916 ==
Type 916 is a variant of Type 912I built for North Korea as military aid. The main difference between Type 915 and Type 912I is the improvement of air conditioning system for subarctic condition. These units were delivered in kit form in 1975, and assembled locally in North Korea

== Type 918 ==
Type 918 is the improvement of earlier Type 915, based on the experience of countering US magnetic mines laid in North Vietnam, which provided unexploded examples to China for research/reverse engineering. Experience gained in turn, were used in improving the design of later degaussing/deperming ships.

== Type 912III ==
Type 912III is the enlarged version of Type 912I with design improvement from lessons learned from research on US magnetic mines. Type 912III shares the same NATO reporting name Yanbai class with its predecessor Type 912I. Specification:

- Length (m): 65
- Width (m): 8.8
- Draft (m): 2.6
- Standard displacement (t): 746
- Full displacement (t): 828
- Speed (kn): 18
- Range: 5300 nmi @ 8 kn or 800 nmi @ 15 kn
- Crew: 55 – 60
- Propulsion: 2 Chinese copy of Kolomna 9-D-8 diesel engine @ 2000 hp
- Armament: twin 37 mm gun x 1 and 2 twin 14.5 mm machine guns

== Type 912IIIA ==
Type 912IIIA is a slight variation of earlier Type 912III, with minor upgrade of Type 912III, mainly with improvement of living condition onboard, and the most obvious visual difference between Type 912IIIA and its predecessor Type 912III is that the after gun mounts on 01 level deck behind the funnel were replaced by a cabin for better crew accommodation. Type 912IIIA shares the same NATO reporting name Yanbai class with its predecessor Type 912III.

== Type 912IIIAH ==
Type 912IIIAH is further improvement of earlier Type 912IIIA, and the most obvious visual difference between Type 912IIIAH and its predecessor Type 912IIIA is that the forward gun mount of Type 912IIIAH is raised on a platform. Type 912IIIA has received NATO reporting name Yanci class. All Type 912IIIAH ships are built in Shanghai by Shenjia (申佳) Shipyard, also known as 4805th Factory of PLAN.

== Ships ==
Type 912 series are designated by a combination of two Chinese characters followed by three-digit number. The second Chinese character is Qin (勤), meaning service in Chinese, because these ships are classified as service ship. The first Chinese character denotes which fleet the ship is service with, with East (Dong, 东) for East Sea Fleet, North (Bei, 北) for North Sea Fleet, and South (Nan, 南) for South Sea Fleet. However, these are subject to change either when PLAN ship naming convention changes, or when units are transferred to different fleets.

| Type | NATO designation | Pennant No. | Name (English) | Name (Han 中文) | Builder | Commissioned | Displacement | Fleet | Status |
|---|---|---|---|---|---|---|---|---|---|
| Type 912IIIAH | Yanci class | Bei-Qin 736 | North Logistics 736 | 北勤 736 | Shengjia Shipyard | 1988 onward | 848 t | North Sea Fleet | Active |
| Type 912IIIAH | Yanci class | Dong-Qin 864 | East Logistics 864 | 东勤 864 | Shengjia Shipyard | 1988 onward | 848 t | East Sea Fleet | Active |
| Type 912IIIAH | Yanci class | Nan-Qin 203 | South Logistics 203 | 南勤 203 | Shengjia Shipyard | January 15, 1998 | 848 t | South Sea Fleet | Active |
| Type 912IIIAH | Yanci class | Nan-Qin 205 | South Logistics 205 | 南勤 205 | Shengjia Shipyard | 1988 onward | 848 t | South Sea Fleet | Active |
| Type 912IIIA | Yanbai class | Dong-Qin 860 | East Logistics 860 | 东勤 860 | Huangpu Shipyard | 1988 onward | 746 t | East Sea Fleet | Active |
| Type 912IIIA | Yanbai class | Dong-Qin 863 | East Logistics 863 | 东勤 863 | Hudong Shipyard | 1988 onward | 746 t | East Sea Fleet | Active |
| Type 912III | Yanbai class | Bei-Qin 735 | North Logistics 735 | 北勤 735 | Hudong Shipyard | December 1973 | 746 t | North Sea Fleet | Active |
| Type 912I | Yanbai class | Nan-Qin 202 | South Logistics 202 | 南勤 202 | Huangpu Shipyard | December 1972 | 570 t | South Sea Fleet | Active |
| Type 912 | Yanbai class | Bei-Qin 731 | North Logistics 731 | 北勤 731 | Hudong Shipyard | March 1970 | 570 t | North Sea Fleet | Active |
| Type 918 | ? | ? | ? | ? | Huangpu Shipyard | Mid 1970s | ? t | North Vietnamese Navy | Retired |
| Type 916 | ? | ? | ? | ? | ? | 1975s | ? t | North Korean Navy | Retired |
| Type 915 | ? | ? | ? | ? | Huangpu Shipyard | 1974s | ? t | North Vietnamese Navy | Retired |
| Yerka class | Yerka class | 2 units | Various | Not named | Hudong Shipyard | 1966–1968 | ? t | East Sea Fleet | Retired |
| Type 601 | ? | Hai-Ci 951 | Sea Magnetism 951 | 海磁 951 | Huangpu Shipyard | Early 1960s | ? t | South Sea Fleet | Retired |
| Yanfang class | Yanfang class | 2 units | Various | Various | ? | Early 1960s | ? t | South Sea Fleet | Retired |
