= Dubei-class target ship =

People's Liberation Army Navy vessel

History

PRC
- Status: Active

General characteristics
- Class & type: Dubei
- Type: Target ship (AGT) / Research ship (AGE)
- Length: 35 m (114 ft 10 in)
- Propulsion: Marine Diesel
- Sensors & processing systems: Navigation radar
- Electronic warfare & decoys: None
- Armament: Unarmed
- Armour: None
- Aircraft carried: None
- Aviation facilities: None

Dubei class target ship (AGT) and range supporting vessel is a very little known auxiliary ship of the People's Liberation Army Navy (PLAN), and has received the NATO reporting name Dubei class. Originally built as a SWATH test platform, it was subsequently converted to a target ship by adding radar reflectors and other electronic equipment to simulate various targets in support of anti-ship weaponry development, but is still capable of housing different scientific instruments to perform various research tasks, and thus also acts as general purpose research ship (AGE).

With the exception of the first unit of this class, ships of this class in PLAN service are designated by a combination of two Chinese characters followed by two-digit number. For the environmental research version, the second Chinese character is Ba (靶), meaning Target in Chinese, since from the second unit onward, this class is primarily used as target ship and range support vessels. The first Chinese character denotes which fleet the ship is service with, with East (Dong, 东) for East Sea Fleet (ESF), North (Bei, 北) for North Sea Fleet (NSF), and South (Nan, 南) for South Sea Fleet (SSF). However, their designations may have changed due to the change of Chinese naval ships naming convention or when newly completed units are assigned to different tasks in the future. The first unit is designated as Shi-Yan 216, or 试验 216 in Chinese, meaning Experiment 216, indicating in addition to range support and targeting missions, it also performs other scientific research tasks. The exact details of Experiment 216 remain mostly unknown as of 2022, because Chinese authorities have not released any specific information. Specification:

- Length: 35 meter

Type	NATO designation	Pennant No.	Name (English)	Name (Han 中文)	Commissioned	Displacement	Fleet	Status
Dubei-class target ship (AGT) / research ship (AGE)	Dubei class	Shi-Yan 216	Experiment 216	试验 216	2015	? t	?	Active
Dubei-class target ship (AGT) / research ship (AGE)	Dubei class	Dong-Ba 01	East Target 01	东靶 01	2015 onward	? t	East Sea Fleet	Active
Dubei-class target ship (AGT) / research ship (AGE)	Dubei class	Nan-Ba 11	South Target 11	南靶 11	2015 onward	? t	South Sea Fleet	Active
Dubei-class target ship (AGT) / research ship (AGE)	Dubei class	Various	Various	Various	2015 onward	? t	Under construction	Active
