= Chinese destroyer Nanchang =

A number of vessels of the People’s Liberation Army Navy have borne the name Nanchang, after the capital of Jiangxi, Nanchang.

- Chinese destroyer Nanchang (163), in service 1982–2016. Now a Museum ship in Nanchang.
- Chinese destroyer Nanchang (101), a Type 055 destroyer, in service since 2020.
