= Type 744 buoy tender =

Chinese buoy tender ship

Class overview
- Operators: People's Liberation Army Navy

Class overview
- Operators: People's Liberation Army Navy
- Preceded by: Type 994 buoy tender
- Succeeded by: Type 944 buoy tender
- Built: 1979 to 1980s
- In service: 1980 onward
- In commission: 1980 onward
- Planned: 4
- Completed: 4
- Active: 4

General characteristics
- Class & type: Yannan-class
- Type: Type 744A Buoy tender
- Displacement: 1,750 long tons (1,780 t)
- Length: 66.6 m (218 ft 6 in)
- Beam: 11.8 m (38 ft 9 in)
- Draft: 4 m (13 ft 1 in)
- Depth: 6 m (19 ft 8 in)
- Propulsion: Marine Diesel @ 973 bhp (726 kW) each
- Electronic warfare & decoys: None
- Armament: 1 twin 25 or 37mm gun & 1 twin 14.5mm machine gun
- Armour: None
- Aircraft carried: None
- Aviation facilities: None

Type 744 buoy tender and its derivatives with the NATO reporting name Yannan (延南) class is a class of Chinese buoy tender that is in service with the People's Liberation Army Navy (PLAN) and Chinese civilian governmental establishments. It is a boat or vessel which services and replaces buoys.

== Precursors ==
=== Type 985 ===
Type 744 derived from the Type 985 buoy tender, the first purpose built buoy tender in the Chinese inventory. Type 985 is designed to be the replacement of earlier buoy tenders converted from former US Navy net laying ships. In the early 1980s, maritime navigational responsibility was transferred from PLAN to Ministry of Transport of the People's Republic of China (MOT). Type 985 was among the equipment transferred from PLAN to MOT and has remained in civilian service since.

=== Type 994 ===
Type 994 buoy tender is the larger cousin of the smaller Type 985 buoy tender, from which it is developed. Like Type 985, all units of this class were transferred to civilian service under MOT:

== Type 744 and 744A ==
Type 744 employs design modifications based on the experience gained on earlier ships. Type 744 is designed by the 708th Institute of China State Shipbuilding Corporation. The 708th Institute is more commonly known as China Shipbuilding and Oceanic Engineering Design Academy. Construction began in December 1979 and four were completed, with the last ship entering service in May 1981. There are two subtypes, the civilian version Type 744 and the naval version Type 744A. The most obvious external visual difference between Types 744 and Type 744A is that the gun mount at in the bow of the naval version Type 744A is replaced by a mast in the civilian version. The ship received NATO reporting name as Yannan (延南) class. One of the Type 744A ships, Dongbiao 263, retired from Chinese Navy on August 1, 2015, and transferred to civilian service. Specification:

- Length between perpendiculars (m): 66.6
- Beam (m): 11.8
- Depth (m): 6
- Draft (m): 4
- Displacement (t): 1750
- Class notation: ZC
- Crew: 44
- Bunks: 52
- Fuel oil tank (cu m): 161
- Fresh water tank (cu m): 276
- Propulsion: Two 8NVD48A-20 diesel engine @ 973 kW each
- Diesel generator: 72 kW x 4
- Crane: PBW 12/15 60 kW x 1

== Ships ==
Type	NATO designation	Pennant No.	Name (English)	Name (Han 中文)	Builder	Commissioned	Length	Displacement	Fleet	Status
Type 985	?	Hai-Biao 624	Sea Buoy 624	海标 624	Jiangnan Shipyard	1966	65.22	1120 t	All fleets	Retired
Type 994	?	Various	Various	Various	Jiangnan Shipyard	1970s	?	1750 t	All fleets	Retired
Type 744	Yannan-class	Hai-Biao 11	Sea Buoy 11	海标 11	Jiangnan Shipyard	Early 1980s	72.35	2,000 t	China Maritime Safety Administration	Active
Type 744	Yannan-class	Hai-Biao 12	Sea Buoy 12	海标 12	Jiangnan Shipyard	Early 1980s	72.35	2,000 t	China Maritime Safety Administration	Active
Type 744	Yannan-class	Hai-Biao 21	Sea Buoy 21	海标 21	Jiangnan Shipyard	Early 1980s	72.35	2,000 t	China Maritime Safety Administration	Active
Type 744	Yannan-class	Hai-Biao 24	Sea Buoy 1	海标 24	Jiangnan Shipyard	Early 1980s	72.35	2,000 t	China Maritime Safety Administration	Active
Type 744	Yannan-class	Hai-Biao 25	Sea Buoy 1	海标 25	Jiangnan Shipyard	Early 1980s	72.35	2,000 t	China Maritime Safety Administration	Active
Type 744	Yannan-class	Hai-Biao 31	Sea Buoy 31	海标 31	Jiangnan Shipyard	Early 1980s	72.35	2,000 t	China Maritime Safety Administration	Active
Type 744A	Yannan-class	Bei-Biao 982	North Buoy 982	北标 982	Jiangnan Shipyard	March 1981	72.35	2,000 t	North Sea Fleet	Active
Type 744A	Yannan-class	Bei-Biao 983	North Buoy 983	北标 983	Jiangnan Shipyard	May 1981	72.35	2,000 t	North Sea Fleet	Active
Type 744A	Yannan-class	Dong-Biao 263	East Buoy 263	东标 263	Jiangnan Shipyard	December 6, 1980	72.35	2,000 t	East Sea Fleet	Retired & transferred to civilian agency on August 1, 2015.
Type 744A	Yannan-class	Nan-Biao 463	South Buoy 463	南标 463	Jiangnan Shipyard	December 14, 1980	72.35	2,000 t	South Sea Fleet	Active
