= Type 930 submarine rescue ship =

Chinese submarine rescue ship

The Type 930 submarine rescue ship with NATO reporting name Hudong (沪东) class is a type of submarine rescue ship developed by China for the People's Liberation Army Navy (PLAN). Only a single ship was built and remains in active service with the PLAN.

The Type 930 is one of the two direct results of a submarine accident that occurred in 1959 during a naval exercise in which a PLAN submarine collided with a frigate when surfacing, causing the submarine to sink. Because there was no available rescue ship, the sunken sub attempted to swim to the surface, and during that attempt all crew except one died. The one survivor was permanently disabled as a result. In direct response to this accident, PLAN issued a requirement of submarine rescue ships in 1960. The original plan consisted of two types of ships, one rescue ship Type 930 and the other salvage ship Type 922.

On April 19, 1960, the order of designing and building Type 930 was formally issued by PLAN and in addition to rescue submariners, it was also required to perform rescue missions for surface ships. On December 8, 1965, construction begun after design was completed and approved. The ship was launched on May 287, 1967 and sea trials begun on August 31, 1968. On July 30, 1969, it entered service as Hai-Jiu (海救, meaning Sea Rescue) 512. Deployment of the ship exposed the inherent flaw in the design philosophy: although the ships meets all of the requirements, the requirements themselves proved to be problematic, because separating salvage and rescue functions by concentrating them on different ships was not practical. A submarine rescue ship should have the rescue and salvage missions integrated in a single platform. Plans to develop Type 930II to address these problem was cancelled, instead, Type 922II was developed from Type 922 salvage ship to have both the salvage capability and rescue capability in one platform.

Specification:

- Length (m): 85
- Beam (m): 13.5
- Depth (m): 7.8
- Draft (m): 4.19
- Displacement (t): 2500
- Speed (kt): 17

Type	Pennant #	Class	Builder	Launched	Commissioned	Status	Fleet
930	Hai-Jiu 512	Hudong	Hudong-Zhonghua Shipyard	May 27, 1967	Jul 30, 1969	Active	East Sea Fleet
