= Qiongsha-class cargo ship =

Chinese cargo ship class

Class overview
- Name: Qiongsha
- Operators: People's Liberation Army Navy
- Preceded by: Galați-class cargo ship
- Succeeded by: Darong-class transport
- Built: 1980s
- In commission: 1980s–
- Planned: 6
- Completed: 6
- Active: 4
- Retired: 2

General characteristics
- Type: Cargo ship / troopship
- Displacement: 2,150 t (2,120 long tons; 2,370 short tons)
- Length: 86 m (282 ft 2 in)
- Beam: 13.4 m (44 ft 0 in)
- Draft: 3.9 m (12 ft 10 in)
- Propulsion: 1,320 bhp (984 kW)
- Speed: 16 kn (30 km/h; 18 mph)
- Range: 2,500 nmi (4,600 km; 2,900 mi)
- Sensors & processing systems: navigational radar
- Armament: 8x 14.5mm heavy machine guns (Cargo ship) 4x 14.5mm heavy machine guns (Hospital Ship)

Qiongsha (琼沙)-class cargo ship is a class of Chinese ship developed by China for its People's Liberation Army Navy (PLAN). Originally intended as replacement of Galați-class cargo ship, these ships are mainly used for supplying garrisons in South China Sea. There are three versions of this class, including cargo ship, ambulance transport, and troopship versions. Although two units have retired in early 2020s, and its successor Darong-class transport has entered service, remaining units of Qiongsha class are still very active in PLAN service. The general designers of all versions of Qiongsha class were Mr. Pan Hui-Quan (潘惠泉) and Mr. Huang Zhong-Fu (黄钟福).

== Cargo ship ==
Qiongsha class cargo ship in PLAN service is directly based on Qiongsha 1 cargo ship in civilian service, which performs the same supply missions. The difference between the military and civilian version besides the fact that the military version is armed with heavy machine guns is that in addition to cargo, the civilian version also carried 219 passengers in cabins divided into two classes. The military version does not have any classification of cabins, but instead, they also act as emergency medical ships, for 2 ships of this class, Nanyun 832 & Nanyu 833. Its secondary assignment as emergency medical provider is resulted from experience of deployment of island garrisons: once a soldier became sick, he must be transported to mainland for treatment, but even when transported by the fastest speedboat, it would still take two days to reach Hainan. Qiongsha class cargo ship is equipped with medical facility for preliminary treatment en route to mainland and thus providing better treatment. The number of passengers that can be carried is decreased accordingly. Cargo capacity of the military version is identical to that of civilian version: 200 tons of solid cargo, 150 tons of freshwater. Of the six ships of this class, all of them were built as cargo ship version to begin with, and it was only later some of them were converted to different versions.

== Ambulance transport ==
Experience of deployment of Qiongsha class cargo ship revealed that the medical service was not sufficient because in addition to island garrisons, there was also a great demand from local fishermen population. Rudimentary treatment does not meet the demand, and a more dedicated version to provide better medical treatment was needed. As a result, decision was made to convert two of the six cargo ships to medical ships. Two ships, Nan-Yun 832 and Nan-Yun 833 were converted, and this medical version is capable of handling up to 130 patient simultaneously. The passenger carrying capability no longer existed as a result of the conversion, but these ships retained the cargo carrying capacity of 350 tons. The armament is reduced by a half, from the original eight heavy machine guns to four.

However, deployment of these ships revealed the inherent problem resulted from the original design: the cargo ship design meant that the stability of the ship in harsh sea state in poor, and in severe bad weather, the ships would move violently and some medical operations such as surgeries could not be performed. Consequently, Nan-Yun 832 was converted back into cargo ship role and only one ship Nan-Kang (南康, meaning South Health in Chinese) is left in the service to play the role of medical provider. This is why the official Chinese classification of this version is ambulance transport, instead of hospital ship, because it cannot carry out some of the medical assignment due to limitations of weather. The experience gained from these ambulance transport, however, provided valuable lessons in the development of true hospital ship, Type 920 hospital ship.

== Troopship ==
Some of the Qiongsha class cargo ship are converted to troopships when they are not converted to ambulance transport/medical evacuation ships. These troopships still maintained the original cargo carrying capacity of 350 tons, but lack the emergency medical treatment capability because the clinical care facility on board the cargo version is deleted to make more rooms for additional troops, with the number of passengers carried is increased to 400.

== Ships ==
Qiongsha class in PLAN service are designated by a combination of two Chinese characters followed by three-digit number. With the exception of the ambulance transport, the second Chinese character for all others is Yun (运), meaning transport in Chinese, because these ships are classified as cargo ship to transport solid cargo and freshwater.. The first Chinese character denotes which fleet the ship is service with, with South (Nan, 南) for South Sea Fleet, because all units are in service with South Sea Fleet. However, the pennant numbers may have changed due to the change of Chinese naval ships naming convention. Specification:

- Displacement (t): 2150
- Length (m): 86
- Beam (m): 13.4
- Depth (m): 7.3
- Draft (m): 3.9
- Speed (kt): 16
- Range (nm): 2500 @ 11 kt, 3000 max
- Endurance (day): 12
- Propulsion: 3 East German 8NVD48A-2U diesel engines @ 1320 hp each\
- Armament: 8 14.5 mm heavy machine guns (4 for ambulance transport version)

Type	Pennant #	Builder	Launched	Commissioned	Status	Fleet
Qiongsha class	Nan-Yun 830	Guangzhou Shipyard International	1980s	1980s	Retired	South Sea Fleet
Qiongsha class	Nan-Yun 831	Guangzhou Shipyard International	1980s	1980s	Retired	South Sea Fleet
Qiongsha class	Nan-Yun 832	Guangzhou Shipyard International	1980s	1980s	Active	South Sea Fleet
Qiongsha class	Nan-Yun 834	Guangzhou Shipyard International	1980s	1980s	Active	South Sea Fleet
Qiongsha class	Nan-Yun 835	Guangzhou Shipyard International	1980s	1980s	Active	South Sea Fleet
Qiongsha class	Nan-Kang 833	Guangzhou Shipyard International	1980s	1980s	Active	South Sea Fleet
