= Type 927 oceanographic surveillance ship =

Class of surveillance ship

History

PRC
- Status: Active

General characteristics
- Class & type: Dongjian class
- Type: Oceanographic surveillance ships (AGOS)
- Displacement: 5,000 long tons (5,100 t)
- Length: 90 m (295 ft 3 in)
- Beam: 30 m (98 ft 5 in)
- Propulsion: Marine Diesel
- Sensors & processing systems: Navigation radar
- Electronic warfare & decoys: None
- Armament: Small arms
- Armour: None
- Aircraft carried: 1
- Aviation facilities: Helipad

Type 927 acoustic surveillance ship is a type of vessel used by the People’s Liberation Army Navy. There are three known Type 927 ships, plus one predecessor Ruili No.10, which is slightly larger than Type 927 ships, and it was used to test onboard systems such as sonars for the three Type 927 ships. The first Type 927 ship was launched around June 2017 in Guangzhou. Type 927 has received NATO reporting name Dongjian class, 东监 in Chinese, meaning East Surveillance, because the West first observed it performing acoustic surveillance missions in East China Sea.

== Characteristics ==
Type 927 vessels are twin-hulled, with a displacement of approximately 5,000 tonnes. The ships are 90 meters long and have a beam of 30 meters.

== Construction ==
The first photos of a Type 927 under construction surfaced in 2017. Two Type 927s were constructed in Huangpu District, Guangzhou, and the third was constructed at the Wuchang Shuangliu shipyard in Wuhan.

== Ships ==
As of end of 2021, there are a total of four ships, including the predecessor unit:

Type	NATO designation	Pennant No.	Name (English)	Name (Han 中文)	Commissioned	Displacement	Fleet	Status
Ruili No. 10 oceanographic surveillance ship	?	Rui-Li 10	Rui-Li 10	瑞利十号	2016	5300 t	All fleets	Active
Type 927 oceanographic surveillance ship (AGOS)	?	780	Beta Ursae Majoris	天璇星	2018	5000 t	South Sea Fleet	Active
Type 927 oceanographic surveillance ship (AGOS)	?	781	Gamma Ursae Majoris	天玑星	2019	5000 t	South Sea Fleet	Active
Type 927 oceanographic surveillance ship (AGOS)	?	782	Eta Ursae Majoris	瑶光星	2019	5000 t	South Sea Fleet	Active
