= Type 911 degaussing/deperming ship =

Type of auxiliary ship

History

PRC
- Status: Active

General characteristics
- Class & type: Dazar class
- Type: Degaussing / deperming ship (ADG)
- Length: 94 m (308 ft 5 in)
- Propulsion: Marine Diesel
- Sensors & processing systems: Navigation radar
- Electronic warfare & decoys: None
- Armament: Unarmed
- Armour: None
- Aircraft carried: None
- Aviation facilities: None

Type 911 degaussing/deperming ship is a type of very little known auxiliary ship currently in service with the People's Liberation Army Navy (PLAN). Designed to replace earlier Type 912 degaussing/deperming ship, Type 911 has received NATO reporting name Dazar class, and as of early 2022, a total of two ships have been identified.

Plans for Type 911 originated from PLAN requirement over several decades ago but due to the backwardness of Chinese industrial capability and technical bottleneck, the requirement was simply too advanced to achieve at the time for China. Furthermore, the political turmoil in China at the time, namely, Cultural Revolution, further disrupted any effort to push the program forward. As a result, the production plan was cancelled and the entire program was put on hold. It was not until more than a quarter century later when the social, economical and political environment in China matured enough to resurrect the program and as of mid 2014, two units have been completed.

The first ship of Type 911 degaussing/deperming ship was completed in Shanghai by Shenjia Shipyard (申佳船厂), also known as the 4805th Factory of PLAN in Shanghai, the same place where its predecessor Type 912 was built. Technologically, Type 911 borrowed heavily from the very last unit of Type 912IIIAH ship wNan-Qin (南勤 in Chinese, meaning South Logistics) 203, whose construction begun in 1995 and was completed more than two years later. Design of Type 911 incorporates onboard equipment of earlier Type 912IIIAH, such as electrical components and VLSI from Siemens, and the ship can reach a speed of 16 kt. New features utilized includes centralized computerized control which can automatically control speed and degaussing/deperming system. This control system is dubbed as Full Digitized Programmable Control and it is the first of its kind to be adopted on ships in China. The advanced control system onboard enables Type 911 to complete degaussing/deperming mission in much shorter timespan, reducing the time by as much as more than two days in comparison to degaussing/deperming ships of older designs when performing mission for ships of the same tonnage. After first unit went into service in South Sea Fleet, a second unit was completed by Dalian Niaonan Shipyard (大连辽南船厂), also known as 4810 Factory of PLAN, went into service in East Sea Fleet two years later. More units are planned, but it is rumored that the pace of the program is significant slowed because plans of domestic production of onboard system encountered technical difficulties, but such claims (mostly from Chinese internet sources) have yet to be confirmed by official or independent sources. Specification:

- Length: 94 meter

Type 911 series in PLAN service are designated by a combination of two Chinese characters followed by three-digit number. The second Chinese character is Qin (勤), meaning service in Chinese, because these ships are classified as service ship. The first Chinese character denotes which fleet the ship is service with, with East (Dong, 东) for East Sea Fleet, North (Bei, 北) for North Sea Fleet, and South (Nan, 南) for South Sea Fleet. However, this is subject to change when PLAN ship naming convention changes, or when units are transferred to different fleets.

Type	Pennant #	Builder	Launched	Commissioned	Status	Fleet
911	Nan-Qin 207	Shanghai Shenjia Shipyard	1995	Jan 15, 1998	Active	South Sea Fleet
911	Dong-Qin 870	Dalian Liaonan Shipyard	After 2000	2009	Active	East Sea Fleet
