= Chinese ship Beidiao 993 =

Chinese naval auxiliary ship

History

China
- Name: Beidiao 993
- Namesake: North Investigation
- Builder: Tongfang Jiangxin Shipbuilding Company, China
- Commissioned: December 2000
- Status: in active service, as of 2014

General characteristics
- Displacement: 2,300 t (2,300 long tons; 2,500 short tons)
- Length: 86.40 m (283 ft 6 in) o/a; 81.50 m (267 ft 5 in) w/l
- Beam: 14.6 m (47 ft 11 in)
- Draught: 3.80 m (12 ft 6 in)
- Depth: 6.80 m (22 ft 4 in)
- Propulsion: 3 × 2,200 kW (2,950 hp) MaK 6M453C diesel engines
- Speed: 16 knots (30 km/h; 18 mph)
- Range: 1,500 nmi (2,800 km; 1,700 mi)
- Complement: 30 naval + 70 civilian

Beidiao 993 (Chinese: 北调 993) is an experimental ship chartered by the Chinese People's Liberation Army Navy (PLAN), and operated by the 760th Research Institute of China Shipbuilding Industry Corporation (CSIC), receiving NATO reporting name Kantan勘探 in Chinese, meaning Exploration.

Beidiao 993 is specifically designed to carry out experiments of acoustic equipment, such as sonar, and its crew is often composed both naval and civilian staff. Constructed by the Tongfang Jiangxin Shipbuilding Company (同方江新造船有限公司) in Jiangxi, trials begun in December 2000 in Dalian and the ship entered service in the same month. In addition to support sonar development, this ship is also equipped to perform various other research tasks and thus also received hull classification of general scientific research ship (AGE/AG).The name Beidiao means North (Sea Fleet) Investigation (Ship).
