= Hongqi-class cargo ship =

Chinese naval transport ship

Class overview
- Operators: People's Liberation Army Navy
- In service: c. 1970 - ?
- Completed: 7

General characteristics
- Type: Cargo ship
- Displacement: 1,981 tonnes (1,950 long tons; 2,184 short tons) (full)
- Length: 62 metres (203 ft)
- Beam: 12 metres (39 ft)
- Draught: 4.4 metres (14 ft)
- Propulsion: 1 x diesel engine; 1 shaft
- Speed: 14 knots (26 km/h; 16 mph)
- Range: 2,500 nautical miles (4,600 km; 2,900 mi) at 11 knots (20 km/h; 13 mph)
- Crew: 35
- Armament: 2 x twin 25mm/80 guns

The Hongqi-class (as designated by NATO) or Hongqi 081-class cargo ship is a class of auxiliary ship in the People's Republic of China's People's Liberation Army Navy (PLAN). Seven entered PLAN service in the 1970s; the same design was also used for civilian ships.

The ships are used to support offshore garrison and may transport personnel as well.

== Ships of the class ==
Name	Hull No.	Builder	Launched	Commissioned	Fleet	Status	Notes
	443				North Sea Fleet		
	528				North Sea Fleet		
	755				East Sea Fleet		
	756				East Sea Fleet		
	771				East Sea Fleet		
	835				South Sea Fleet		
	836				South Sea Fleet		

== Sources ==
- Saunders, Stephan, ed. (2015). Jane's Fighting Ships 2015-2016. Jane's Information Group. ISBN 978-0710631435.
- Wertheim, Eric (2013). The Naval Institute Guide to Combat Fleets of the World: Their Ships, Aircraft, and Systems (16 ed.). Annapolis, Maryland: Naval Institute Press. ISBN 978-1591149545.
