= Galati-class cargo ship =

Chinese cargo ship class

Class overview
- Builders: Santieral Shipyard, Galați, Romania
- Operators: People's Liberation Army Navy
- In commission: 1970s–
- Completed: 2

General characteristics
- Type: Cargo ship
- Displacement: 5,300 t (5,200 long tons; 5,800 short tons)
- Length: 328 ft (100 m)
- Beam: 45.6 ft (13.9 m)
- Draft: 21.6 ft (6.6 m)
- Propulsion: 1 × Sulzer 5TADS56 marine diesel engine; 1 shaft; 2,500 bhp (1,864 kW)
- Speed: 12.5 knots (23.2 km/h; 14.4 mph)
- Range: 5,000 nmi (9,300 km; 5,800 mi) at 12 kt
- Capacity: 3,750 tons cargo; 250 tons oil fuel
- Complement: 50

The Galati-class cargo ship (as designated by NATO) is a class of cargo ship of the People's Republic of China's People's Liberation Army Navy. Two were converted in the early-1970s from nine ships built in the 1960s at the Santieral Shipyard in Galați, Romania.

== Ships of the class ==
Name	Hull No.	Builder	Launched	Commissioned	Fleet	Status	Notes
Haiyun 318					South Sea Fleet		
Haijiu 600					South Sea Fleet		
