= Type 639 auxiliary ship =

Oceanographic surveillance ship

Class overview
- Operators: People's Liberation Army Navy
- Built: 2006-2013
- Completed: 6
- Active: 6

General characteristics
- Class & type: Type 639
- Type: Auxiliary ship
- Displacement: 1500 ton
- Sensors & processing systems: Towed array sonar (Type 639)

The Type 639 (NATO reporting name: Kanhai) is a class of Chinese People's Liberation Army Navy (PLAN) auxiliary ship. The Type 639 is an ocean surveillance ship using a small-waterplane-area twin hull; it is equipped with a tactical towed array sonar for observing submarines. The Type 639A is a hydrographic survey variant which may retain some submarine surveillance capability; existing or new ships may have been converted.

== Ships of the class ==
Name	Builder	Launched	Commissioned	Fleet	Status
Bei Ce 901			By 2018	North Sea Fleet	Active
Bei Ce 902			By 2018	North Sea Fleet	Active
Dong Ce 232			By 2018	East Sea Fleet	Active
Dong Ce 233			By 2015	East Sea Fleet	Active
Nan Ce 429			By 2015	South Sea Fleet	Active
Nan Ce 430			By 2015	South Sea Fleet	Active

== Sources ==
- Thorne, Devin (March 2024). "China's T-AGOS The Dongjian Class Ocean Surveillance Ship". China Maritime Report (36). China Maritime Studies Institute.
