= Japanese ship Hibiki =

Three Japanese warships have borne the name Hibiki:

- Japanese destroyer Hibiki (1906), a Kamikaze-class destroyer launched in 1906 and scrapped in 1928
- Japanese destroyer Hibiki (1932), an Akatsuki-class destroyer launched in 1932 and transferred to the USSR in 1947
- JS Hibiki, a Hibiki-class ocean surveillance ship
