= Russian ship Vasiliy Tatishchev =

Vasiliy Tatishchev
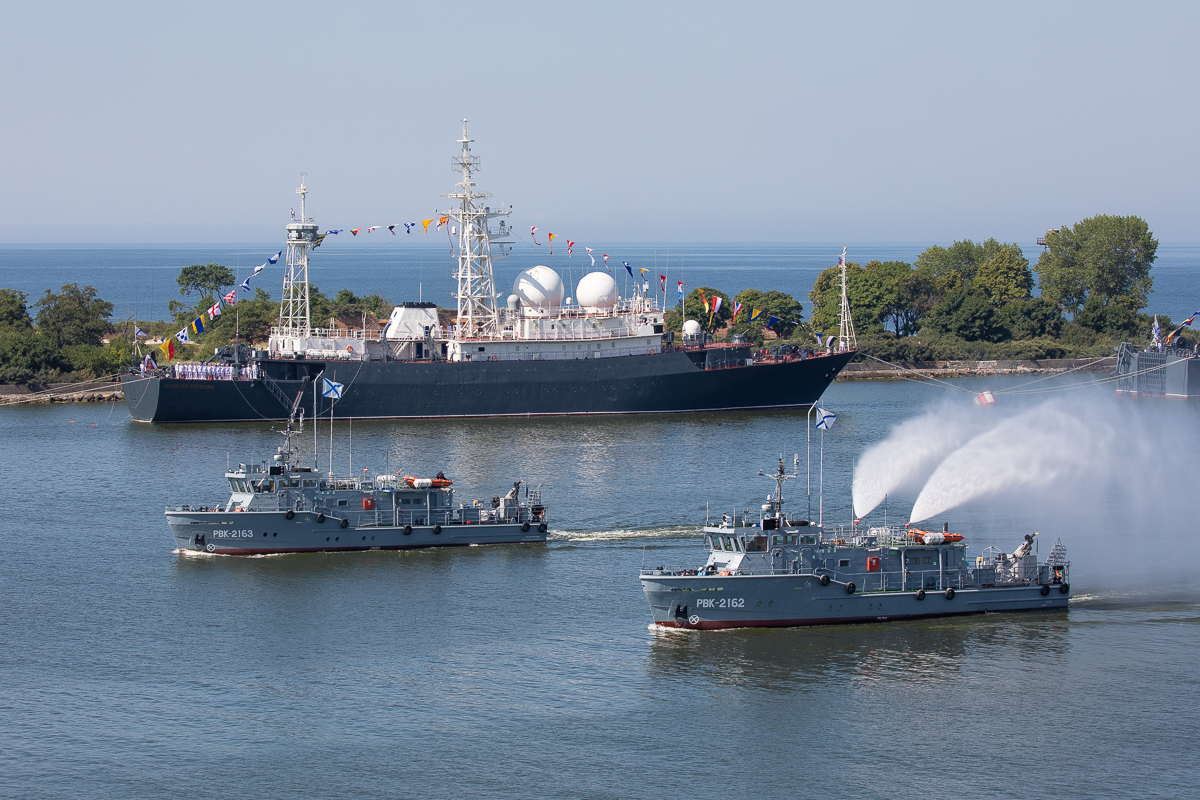
- Vasiliy Tatishchev (background) during Navy Day 2018

History

Russia
- Name: Pelengator
- Builder: Remontowa Shipbuilding SA, Poland
- Yard number: 864/6
- Launched: 27 November 1987
- Commissioned: 23 July 1988
- Renamed: Vasiliy Tatishchev, 31 January 2000
- Identification: 402
- Status: Active

General characteristics
- Class & type: Vishnya-class intelligence ship
- Displacement: 3,470 tons full load
- Length: 91.5 m (300 ft 2 in)
- Beam: 14.6 m (47 ft 11 in)
- Draught: 4.5 m (14 ft 9 in)
- Propulsion: 2 shafts, 2x Zgoda Sulzer 12AV 25/30 diesel engines, 4,400 bhp (3,300 kW)
- Speed: 16 knots
- Complement: 146 (= 6 passengers)
- Sensors & processing systems: Radar: MR-212/201 (Palm Frond) Sonar: MG-349, MGP-303
- Electronic warfare & decoys: Various intercept arrays and radio direction finding equipment
- Armament: 2 AK-630 six-barreled Gatling 30 mm/L60 guns; 2 SA-N-8 surface-to-air missiles

Vasiliy Tatishchev (former Pelengator) is a Russian SIGINT ship of the Vishnya class (Project 864).

== Design and description ==
The Vasiliy Tatishchev specializes in signal acquisition, interception of communication and navigation signals, as well as mobile telephone communication. Vasiliy Tatishchev is equipped with SIGINT and COMINT electronic intelligence via an extensive array of sensors. The data could be transmitted to shore via satellite link by two satellite communications antennae inside radomes.

For naval use the vessel has two Volga (Don Kay) navigation radars.

== Construction and career ==
The ship was launched in 27 November 1987 and is in operation since 23 July 1988. It was built by Remontowa Shipbuilding SA (formerly Stocznia Północna) in Poland. She has been assigned to the Baltic Fleet.

Vasily Tatishchev was deployed to the Eastern Mediterranean Sea on 5 October 2015 to monitor the civil war in Syria.

In mid 2022 the vessel was deployed to a Russian blockade of NATO ships in the Adriatic Sea. According to La Repubblica the task of Vasiliy Tatishchev was to study the "electronic reactions" of NATO assets.

In June 2024, the ship took up position in international waters northwest of the German island of Fehmarn. Its likely mission was to shadow the participants in the large-scale military exercise BALTOPS, which were gathering in the Bay of Kiel and preparing to enter the German naval base in Kiel. In July 2026, she was reported operating in the North Sea.
