= People's Liberation Army Navy 70th Anniversary Parade =

2019 Chinese naval military parade

Military Parade to Celebrate the 70th Anniversary of the Founding of the Chinese People's Liberation Army Navy 中国人民解放军海军成立70周年海上阅兵
- Genre: Military parade
- Date: 23 April 2019
- Locations: Offshore area of Qingdao, Shandong, China
- General Secretary of the CCP: Xi Jinping (Note: CCP General Secretary Xi Jinping has also served as Chairman of the CCP Central Military Commission, the supreme commander of the armed forces since 2012.)

The military parade to celebrate the 70th anniversary of the founding of the Chinese People's Liberation Army Navy was a Chinese naval military parade which was held in the port city of Qingdao on 23 April 2019, in honor of the 70th anniversary of the People's Liberation Army Navy (PLAN). It was the first naval parade by the PLAN since the 2018 South China Sea Parade just over year prior. Xi Jinping, General Secretary of the Chinese Communist Party and Chairman of the Central Military Commission reviewed the parade in his position as party leader and commander-in-chief. 32 naval vessels and 39 naval warplanes of the PLAN took part in the parade.

== Parade participants ==
Besides PLAN officials and ships, the parade included 13 foreign ships and was attended by 60 foreign delegations. The following ships took part in the parade:

- Chinese aircraft carrier Liaoning
- Type 055 destroyer
- Admiral Gorshkov-class frigate (Russia)
- INS Kolkata (India)
- INS Shakti (India)
- RSS Stalwart (Singapore)
- HMAS Melbourne (FFG 05) (Australia)
- JS Suzutsuki (Japan)
- BRP Tarlac (LD-601) (Philippines)
- BNS Prottoy (Bangladesh)
- F14 Sinphyushin (Myanmar)

Ships also came from countries such as France, Vietnam and Thailand.
