= Type 814A spy ship =

Chinese spy ship

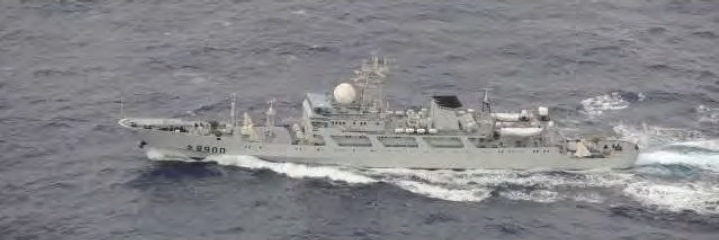
- 814A spy ship in November 2011

History

China
- Name: Bei-Diao (900)
- Builder: Hudong-Zhonghua Shipbuilding
- Laid down: 22 December 1983
- Launched: 12 June 1986
- Commissioned: 29 October 1986
- In service: in active service

General characteristics
- Class & type: Type 814A spy ship
- Displacement: 2,198 t (2,163 long tons)
- Length: 94.33 m (309.5 ft)
- Beam: 11.6 m (38 ft)
- Draft: 4.04 m (13.3 ft)
- Propulsion: 2 x 6E390 medium-speed diesel engines @ 2646 kW (3600 hp) w/ 466 rpm
- Speed: 20.03 kn (23.05 mph)
- Range: 4,000 nmi (4,600 mi) @ 18 kn (21 mph)

Type 814A spy ship with NATO reporting name Dadie(大谍, meaning Big Spy) is a type of Chinese spy ship in service (as of 2022) with the People's Liberation Army Navy (PLAN). Originally, a total of four ships were planned, but eventually, only one was completed due to the availability of newer designs.

PLAN originally issued a requirement for four spy ships to meet its urgent need, after the failure of the earlier cancelled Type 812. To speed up the program, PLAN suggested adopting the hull of Type 635C hydrographic survey ship. The 1st Directorate of the 708th Institute of China State Shipbuilding Corporation, which is also more commonly known as China Shipbuilding and Oceanic Engineering Design Academy (中国船舶及海洋工程设计研究) nowadays, was assigned to design the ship. However, after the design was completed, it was revealed that the design could not meet requirements issued by PLAN during design review. On March 25, 1980, PLAN issued an order to revise the design to 1500 tons, designated as Type 814. On June 30, 1980, the 708th Institute completed the revision. However, due to drastic changes made by PLAN, it was once again revealed during design review that the revised design could not efficiently meet the new requirements issued by PLAN. The designer recommended enlarging the ship by increasing the displacement by twenty percent from 1500 tons to 1800 tons. The recommendation was accepted and in February 1982 the revision was completed, and in August 1982, the design was completed. The finalized design is designated as Type 814A. In August 1983, design work for construction was completed and construction began on December 22, 1983. During sea trials, various aircraft and naval warships were deployed in support of trials, including Type 033 submarines, Harbin SH-5, Harbin H-5, submarine chasers, Type 051 destroyers and Type 403 shore based radars. On-board systems such as acoustic, radar, communication, and optical systems proved satisfactory and the ship was accepted into service in the North Sea Fleet. Because the previous design experienced excessive vibration, particular attention in design was given to reduce vibration. Type 814A is designed to withstand a wind scale of 12. The name of the ship is Bei-Diao (北调, meaning North Investigate) 900.

Type	Pennant #	Builder	Laid down	Launched	Commissioned	Status	Fleet
814A	Bei-Diao 900	Hudong-Zhonghua Shipbuilding	Dec 22, 1983	Jun 12, 1986	Oct 29, 1986	Active	North Sea Fleet
