= Russian ship Viktor Leonov =

Viktor Leonov
History

Russia
- Name: Odograf
- Namesake: Viktor Leonov
- Builder: Remontowa Shipbuilding SA, Poland
- Commissioned: 5 October 1988
- Renamed: Viktor Leonov, 2004
- Status: Active

General characteristics
- Class & type: Vishnya-class intelligence ship
- Displacement: 3,100 tons
- Length: 91.5 m (300 ft 2 in)
- Beam: 14.6 m (47 ft 11 in)
- Draught: 4.5 m (14 ft 9 in)
- Propulsion: 2 shafts, 2 × Zgoda Sulzer 12AV 25/30 diesel engines, 4,400 bhp (3,300 kW)
- Speed: 16 knots
- Complement: 146 (6 embarked units)
- Sensors & processing systems: Radar: MR-212/201 (Palm Frond) Sonar: MG-349, MGP-303
- Electronic warfare & decoys: Various intercept arrays and radio direction finding equipment
- Armament: 2 AK-630 six-barreled Gatling 30 mm/L60 guns; 2 SA-N-8 surface-to-air missiles

Viktor Leonov (former Odograf) is a Russian SIGINT ship of the Vishnya class (Project 864).

== Design ==
The ship specialises in SIGINT and COMINT.

== Construction ==
The ship was commissioned on 5 October 1988 and was constructed in Poland.

== Career ==
In December 2019 the ship was sailing off the coast of South Carolina and Florida under conditions described as "unsafe" as the vessel was not using running lights in low visibility weather and did not respond to commercial vessels' attempts to communicate to avoid potential accidents. The ship has patrolled in international waters off the eastern coast of the United States since 2015. It also often operates in the Caribbean, near Cuba and Trinidad and Tobago.

In April 2025 it was monitored by Irish Defence Forces, with LÉ Samuel Beckett monitoring the ship. The ship was reported active off the United Kingdom in late 2026.
