= JS Harima =

Hibiki-class ocean surveillance ship

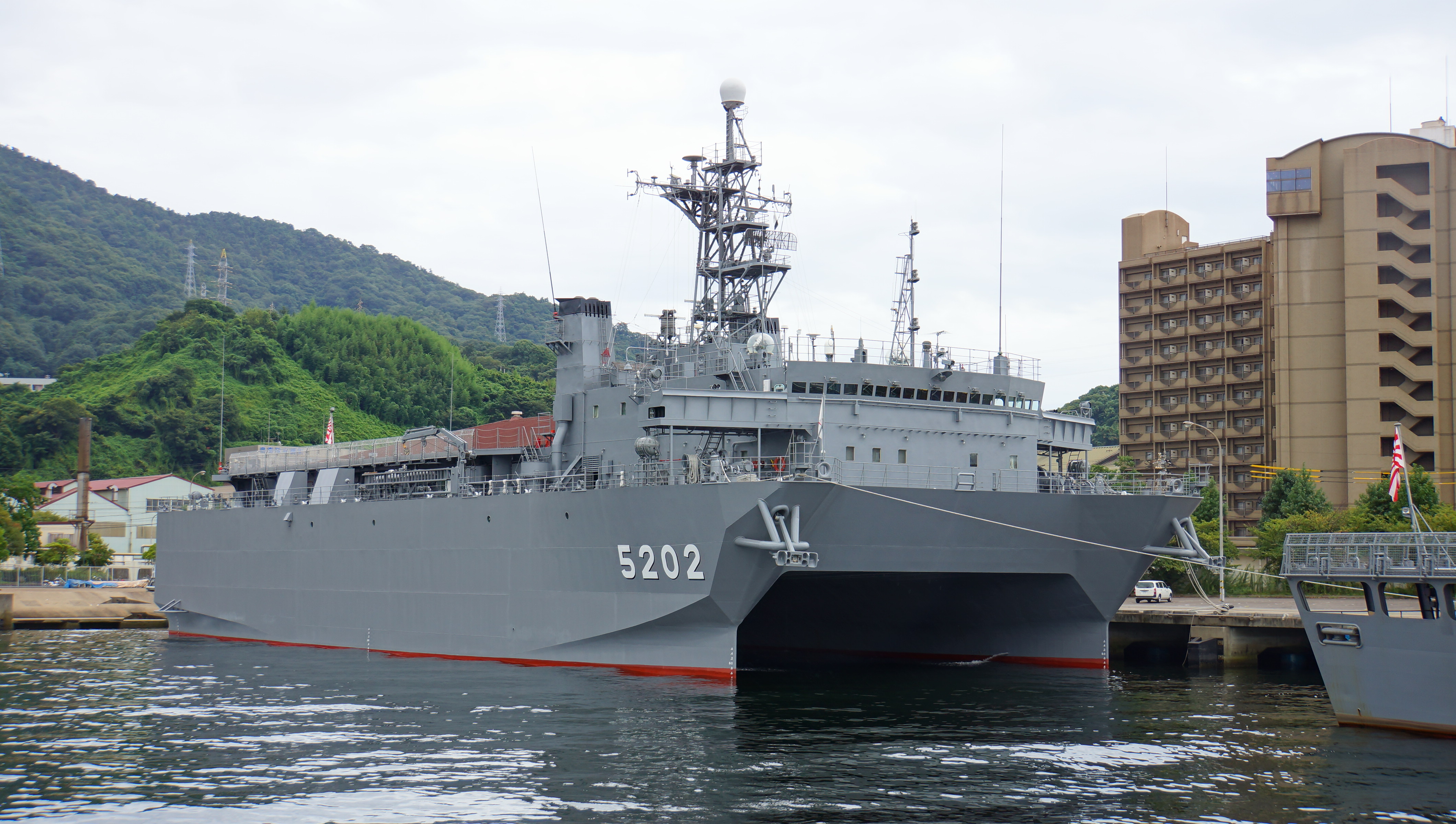
- JS Harima at Kure on 15 September 2014

History

Japan
- Name: Harima; (はりま)
- Namesake: Harima
- Ordered: 1990
- Builder: Mitsui, Tamano
- Laid down: 26 December 1990
- Launched: 11 September 1991
- Commissioned: 10 March 1992
- Home port: Kure
- Identification: MMSI number: 431999585; Hull number: AOS-5202
- Status: Active

General characteristics
- Class & type: Hibiki-class ocean surveillance ship
- Displacement: 2,850–3,800 long tons (2,896–3,861 t) full load
- Length: 67.0 m (219 ft 10 in)
- Beam: 29.9 m (98 ft 1 in)
- Draft: 7.5 m (24 ft 7 in)
- Propulsion: 4 × Mitsubishi S6U-MPTK diesel engines; 2 × shafts
- Speed: 11 knots (20 km/h; 13 mph)
- Complement: 40
- Sensors & processing systems: OPS-16; OPS-9; Sonar AN / UQQ-2
- Aviation facilities: Helipad

JS Harima (AOS-5202) is a Hibiki-class ocean surveillance ship of Japan Maritime Self-Defense Force (JMSDF).

== Development and design ==
Hibiki-class vessels have a beam of 30 metres (98 ft 5 in), a top speed of 11 knots (20 km/h; 13 mph), and a standard range of 3,800 nautical miles (7,000 km; 4,400 mi). Each vessel has a crew of 40, including five American civilian technicians, and a flight deck for helicopters to operate off of. They are able to deploy on station for 90 days.

The vessels have an AN/UQQ-2 Surveillance Towed Array Sensor System (SURTASS), which was installed in the United States. Data from the sensors is relayed through the Defense Satellite Communications System and processed and shared with the United States. The data is fed into the Integrated Undersea Surveillance System.

Propulsion is provided by four Mitsubishi S6U-MPTK diesel electric engines.

== Construction and career ==
Harima was laid down on 26 December 1990 at Mitsui Engineering & Shipbuilding, Tamano and launched on 11 September 1991. She was commissioned on 10 March 1992. Currently, her homeport is in Kure.

On 4 February 2001 at 4:11 AM, about 110 km South of the main island of Okinawa (25 degrees 08.4 minutes north latitude, 127 degrees 32.0 minutes east longitude), a tuna longline fishing boat, belonging to the Naha district fishing port in Okinawa Prefecture (11th Hikei Maru [9.1 tons]) had its longline scratched by the outer panel of the center of the starboard side, and a hole, with a diameter of 50 cm, occurred in the bow of the Hikei Maru, causing a wreck. On October 25 2001, at the Naha Branch of the Japan Marine Accident Inquiry Agency, the Hikei Maru crew members took measures to prevent operations due to the lack of movement monitoring on the Harima side and non-compliance with navigation between various vessels. The ruling was made, with the Hikei Maru crew as a warning, mainly due to insufficient navigation and non-compliance with navigation between various vessels.

On 1 December 2015, the Oceanographic Command Group was reorganized into the Oceanographic Command and Anti-submarine Support Group and was incorporated into the 1st Acoustic Measurement Corps, which was newly formed under the same group.

On 1 November 2017, a crew system was introduced to the 1st Acoustic Measurement Corps for the first time as a JMSDF ship, and, from now on, the crew will not be fixed, as three crews will operate two ships alternately.
