= Type 614 research vessel =

Chinese research vessel

Type 614 research vessel is a type of Chinese research vessel in service with the People's Liberation Army Navy (PLAN). The ship has two derivatives, one is in weather ship configuration, and the other in oceanographic research ship configuration. Type 614 research vessel has been replaced by Type 625.

== Type 614I ==
The origin of Type 614I weather ship rooted back in March 1965 when requirement was first issued to the 708th Institute of China State Shipbuilding Corporation, which is also more commonly known as China Shipbuilding and Oceanic Engineering Design Academy (中国船舶及海洋工程设计研究) nowadays. Initial design was completed in June 1965 and on June 28, 1965, design review was held in Beijing. In December 1965, the design was finalized and in February of the following year, construction begun in Shanghai, and was completed in December 1969. The ship was initially named as Xiangyanghong (向阳红, meaning facing the sun in red in Chinese) 01, and after Type 614 II and Type 614III entered service, Type 614 is renamed as Type 614I to avoid confusion because the term Type 614 is used to denote all three types. After decades of service with Chinese military and paramilitary establishments, it was transferred to Chinese coast guard. Specification:

- Length (m): 66.22
- Depth (m): 4.8
- Width (m): 10.2
- Draft (m): 3.5
- Displacement (t): 1120
- Speed (kt): 15.1
- Propulsion: two 8350Z @ 772 kW (1050 hp) each

== Type 614II ==
Type 614II weather ship is an enlarged version of Type 614I, and it is longer than its predecessor. The propulsion is D39 engine, which replaced 8350Z engine on Type 614I, to reach an intended speed of 18 kt. Initial design was completed in 1966 and was finalized in May 1967. Decision was made to build two ship simultaneously in parallel, and construction for both ships begun at Guangzhou Shipyard International in 1968. Both ships were launched in mid 1971 and both entered service in May 1972.

Type 614II ships are named as Xiangyanghong 02 and Xiangyanghong 03 respectively. In May 1986, the 708th Institute carried out a major redesign of Xiangyanghong 02 to enable it to handle MAREX-740 buoy system, and the conversion work was carried out by the same builder, which completed the work in 1988. Specification:

- Length (m): 74
- Depth (m): 4.7
- Draft (m): 3.4
- Width (m): 10
- Displacement (t): 1178.9
- Speed (kt): 17.5
- Propulsion: Two D39 @ 1360 kW (1850 hp)

== Type 614III ==
Type 614III is the oceanographic research ship version of the Type 614 series, and it is based on earlier Type 614II weather ship. The 3rd Directorate of the 708th Institute completed the design of Type 614III in February 1970 and after changing the planned contractors for several times, Wuhu Shipyard was finally selected to build Type 614III. As with its predecessor Type 614II, the two ships of Type 614III were also built simultaneously in parallel with construction begun in 1971, launched in 1972 and entering service in September 1974. Type 614III ships are named as Xiangyanghong 07 and Xiangyanghong 08 respectively. Specification:

- Length (m): 74
- Depth (m): 4.7
- Draft (m): 3.4
- Width (m): 10
- Displacement (t): 1170
- Speed (kt): 17.8
- Propulsion: Two D39 @ 1360 kW (1850 hp)

== Ships ==
Original names of the ships in the table might have been changed after transferring to different governmental establishments.

Type	Classification	Pennant #	Builder	Laid down	Launched	Commissioned	Status	Fleet
614I	weather ship	Xiangyanghong 01	Jiangnan Shipyard	Feb 1967	―	Dec 19, 1969	Retired	East Sea Fleet
614II	weather ship	Xiangyanghong 02	Guangzhou Shipyard International	1968	1971	May 1972	Retired	South Sea Fleet
614II	weather ship	Xiangyanghong 03	Guangzhou Shipyard International	1968	1971	May 1972	Retired	South Sea Fleet
614III	oceanographic research ship	Xiangyanghong 07	Wuhu Shipyard	Jun 1971	Apr 20, 1972	Sep 26, 1974	Retired	North Sea Fleet
614III	oceanographic research ship	Xiangyanghong 08	Wuhu Shipyard	Jun 1971	Apr 20, 1972	Sep 26, 1974	Retired	North Sea Fleet
