= Type 635 hydrographic survey ship =

Chinese class of naval diving support vessel

History

PRC
- Status: Active

General characteristics
- Class & type: Yanlai class
- Type: Hydrographic survey ship
- Propulsion: Marine Diesel
- Sensors & processing systems: Navigation radar
- Electronic warfare & decoys: None
- Armour: None
- Aircraft carried: None
- Aviation facilities: None

Type 635 hydrographic survey ship is a series of hydrographic survey ships developed by China for its People's Liberation Army Navy (PLAN). More successful than Type 625 of the same era, Type 635 still remains active in PLAN after half a century of service, even after its successor Type 636 has entered service. Type 635 series in PLAN service are designated by a combination of two Chinese characters followed by three-digit number. The second Chinese character is Ce (测), meaning survey in Chinese, because these ships are classified as survey ship. The first Chinese character denotes which fleet the ship is service with, with East (Dong, 东) for East Sea Fleet, North (Bei, 北) for North Sea Fleet, and South (Nan, 南) for South Sea Fleet. However, pennant numbers may have changed due to the change of Chinese naval ships naming convention.

== Type 635A/B/C ==
Type 635 A/B/C series with NATO reporting name Yanlai (延来) class is the first batch of the Type 635 series. These ships are sometimes collectively known as Type 635I, because the difference between these models are relatively minor in comparison to the second batch. These ships differ from second batch in that the deck at the stern is circular shaped and they are purely for surveying missions. Construction of the first ship begun in 1970 and some modification was made to the second ship, which was designated as Type 635B, and the first ship was subsequently designated as Type 635A. In 1976, based on the experienced gained from deployment, PLAN required further upgrade of Type 635B and these ships are designated as Type 635C. Design was completed in Jun 1977 and construction for both ships begun simultaneously in October of the same year, and they entered service respectively in 1982 and 1983. Type 635C actually developed later than Type 635II, and they are built by Jiangxi Ruichang Jiangzhou Shipyard (江西瑞昌江州造船厂), a division of Jiangzhou Union Shipbuilding Co., Ltd. (江西江州联合造船有限责任公司) Specification:

- Length (m): 74.8
- Length between perpendiculars (m): 68.6
- Beam: 10
- Depth (m): 4.7
- Draft (m): 3.5
- Displacement (t): 1216
- Main propulsion: two diesel engine @ 1320 kW (1800 hp) each
- Max wind scale allowed for sailing: 10
- Range (nm): 4000

== Type 635II ==
Type 635II is the development of Type 635A/B, and differs from its predecessor in that in addition to hydrographic survey missions, Type 635II is also capable of carrying out ASW and mine laying missions. To carry out these combat missions, additional armament was added. The most obvious visual external difference between Type 635A/B/C (Type 635I) and Type 635 II is that the deck at the stern of Type 635II is in rectangular shape, instead of the circular shape of that of Type 635I. Construction begun in 1970, but due to political turmoil in China, namely, Cultural Revolution, it was not half a decade later was the ship finally delivered. Specification:

- Length (m): 81.2
- Length between perpendiculars (m): 76
- Beam: 9
- Depth (m): 4.4
- Draft (m): 3.54
- Displacement (t): 1245
- Main propulsion: two diesel engine @ 1320 kW (1800 hp) each
- Max wind scale allowed for sailing: 10
- Max speed (kt): > 17
- Range (nm): 4200
- Endurance (day): 30
- Armament: 2 twin 37 mm gun, 2 twin 25 mm gun, 2 depth charge mortar, 2 mine rails

Type	Pennant #	Builder	Laid down	Commissioned	Status	Fleet
635A	Bei-Ce 943	Hudong-Zhonghua Shipyard	―	Jan 1970	Active	North Sea Fleet
635B	Dong-Ce 227	Hudong-Zhonghua Shipyard	―	1972	Active	East Sea Fleet
635C	Dong-Ce 226	Jiangxi Ruichang Jiangzhou Shipyard	Oct 1977	Feb 1982	Active	East Sea Fleet
635C	Nan-Ce 427	Jiangxi Ruichang Jiangzhou Shipyard	Oct 1977	Jan 1983	Active	South Sea Fleet
635II	Nan-Ce 420	Guangzhou Shipyard International	Dec 1970	Nov 1975	Active	South Sea Fleet
