= JS Bingo =

Hibiki-class ocean surveillance ship

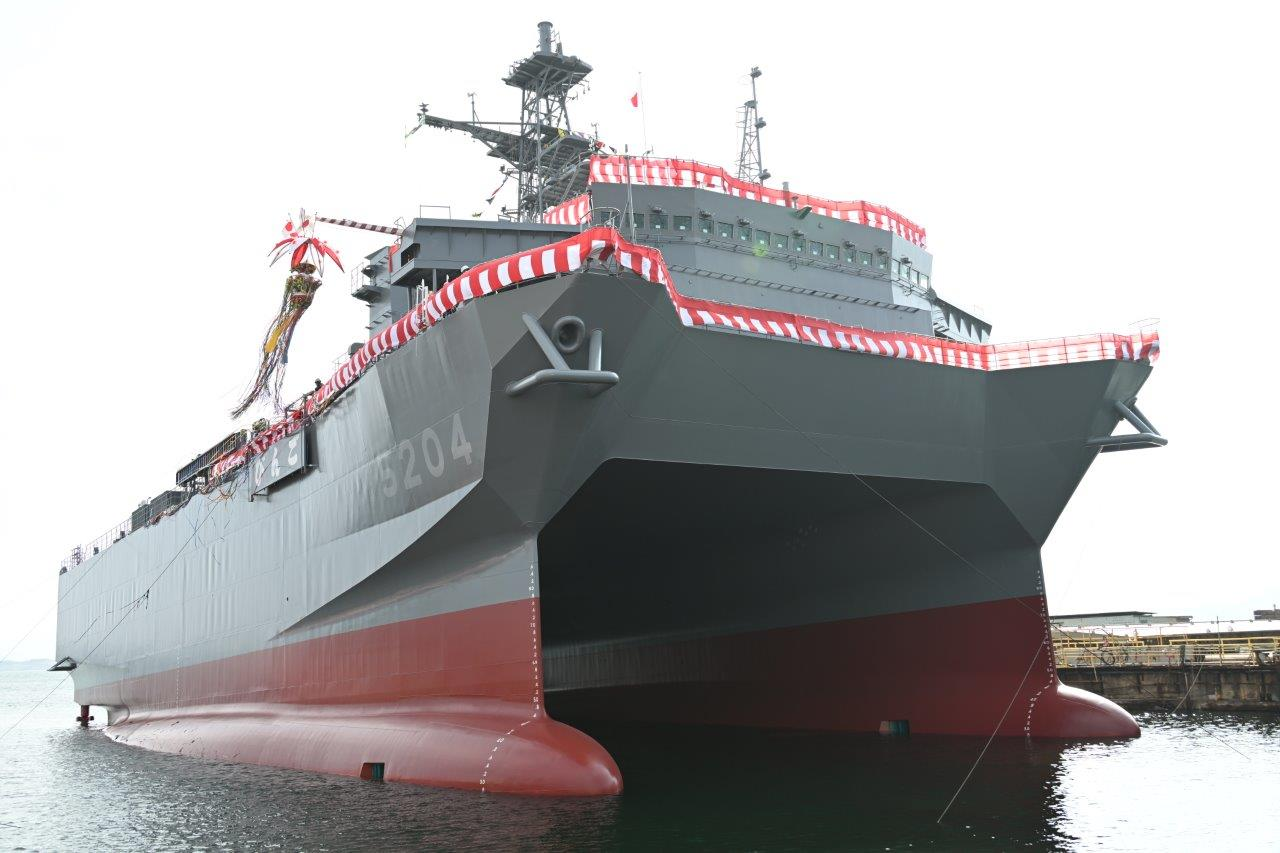
- Bingo on her launching day

History

Japan
- Name: Bingo
- Builder: Mitsubishi Heavy Industries Maritime Systems, Tamano
- Cost: Approx. 19.6 billion yen
- Laid down: 19 March 2024
- Launched: 17 February 2025
- Commissioned: 6 March 2026
- Identification: Hull number: AOS-5204
- Status: Active

General characteristics
- Class & type: Hibiki-class ocean surveillance ship
- Displacement: Standard: 2,900 t (2,900 long tons); Full load: 3,800 t (3,700 long tons)
- Length: 67.0 m (219 ft 10 in)
- Beam: 29.9 m (98 ft 1 in)
- Draft: 7.5 m (24 ft 7 in)
- Depth: 15.3 m (50 ft 2 in)
- Installed power: 3,000 hp (2,200 kW)
- Propulsion: 4 × MTU 8V 4000 M33S diesel engines; 2 x shafts
- Speed: 11 knots (20 km/h; 13 mph)
- Crew: About 40
- Sensors & processing systems: AN/UQQ-2 sonar
- Aviation facilities: Helipad

Bingo (びんご) is a surveillance ship of the Japan Maritime Self-Defense Force, and the fourth ship of the Hibiki class. She was named after the Bingo Sea, which spans across the central Seto Inland Sea. This makes her the first ship to be named in this manner, as the Imperial Japanese Navy never had a ship named after the Bingo Sea.

== History ==
Under the JMSDF's 2022 Mid-Term Defense Program, Bingo was laid down on 19 March 2024 at Mitsubishi Heavy Industries Maritime Systems' Tamano shipyard, and was named and launched on 17 February 2025. The ship was commissioned on 6 March 2026.
