= 2018 South China Sea Parade =

Shenwei-2018 South China Sea Parade (simplified Chinese: “神威-2018”海上阅兵; traditional Chinese: “神威-2018”海上閱兵; pinyin: “Shénwēi-2018” Hǎishàng Yuèbīng) was a military parade held in the South China Sea near Sanya, Hainan on April 13, 2018. It is the biggest marine parade since the establishment of the Communist State in 1949. It saw 50 warships, 76 fighters and more than 10,000 military officers and soldiers taking part. Xi Jinping, Chairman of the Central Military Commission, reviewed the People's Liberation Army Navy on April 11, 2018. More than half of the vessels were commissioned after the 18th National Congress of the Chinese Communist Party in November 2012, when Xi became the General Secretary of the Chinese Communist Party (paramount leader).

== Parade Participants ==
=== The First Echelon ===
- Two Type 094 submarines
- Four Type 093 submarines

=== The Second Echelon ===
- Six Type 039 submarines

=== The Third Echelon ===
- Four Type 052D destroyers: Hefei (DDG-174), Yinchuan (DDG-175 ), Changsha (DDG-173) and Kunming (DDG-172).
- Two Type 052C destroyers: Changchun (150 ) and Zhengzhou (151)
- Two Type 054A frigates: Hengshui (572) and Liuzhou (573)

=== The Fourth Echelon ===
- Chinese aircraft carrier Liaoning
- Type 901 fast combat support ship: Hulunhu (965)
- Type 052D destroyer: Xining (DDG-117 )
- Two Type 052C destroyers: Lanzhou (170) and Haikou (717)
- Type 051C destroyers: Shijiazhuang (116)

=== The Fifth Echelon ===
- Two Type 071 amphibious transport docks: Kunlun Shan (998) and Changbai Shan (989)
- Two Type 072A landing ships: Wutai Shan (917) and Wuyi Shan (914)
- Type 052C destroyer: Jinan (152)
- Type 054A frigate: Hengyang (568)

=== The Sixth Echelon ===
- Eight Type 056 corvettes: Xinyang (501), Huangshi (502), Qinhuangdao (505), Jingmen (506), Tongren (507), Qujing (508), Hanzhong (520).

=== The Seventh Echelon ===
- Type 903 replenishment ship: Luomahu (964).
- Type 815G spy ship: Tianwangxing (853)
- Type 920 hospital ship: Daishandao (866)
- Type 910 Auxiliary ship: Zu Chongzhi (893)
- Type 0891A training ship: Qi Jiguang (83)
- Type 636A hydrographic survey ship: Deng Jiaxian (874).
- Type 926 submarine support ship: Oceanic Island (864).
- Tugboat: 739

== Gallery ==
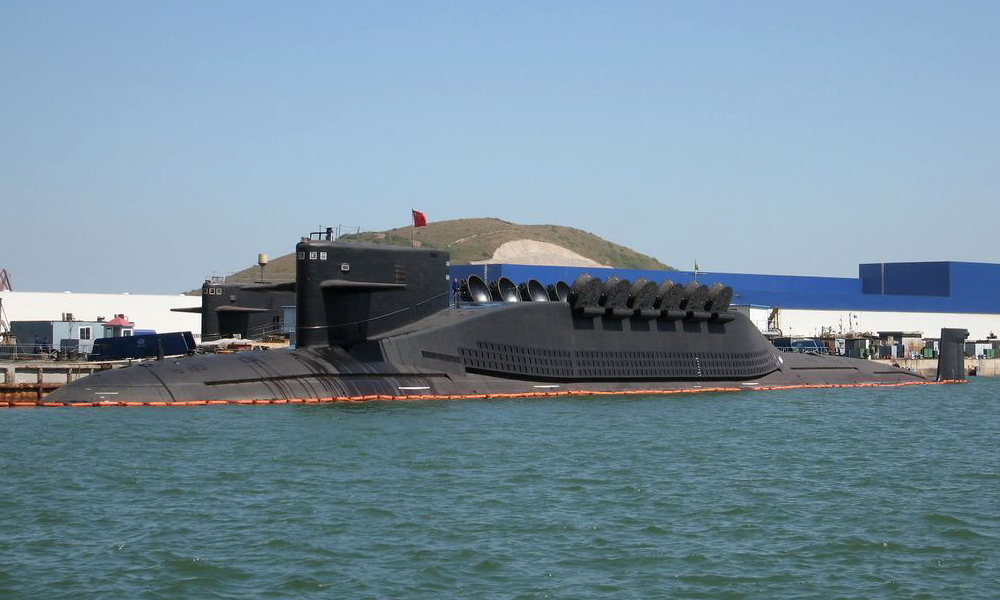
Type 094 submarine.

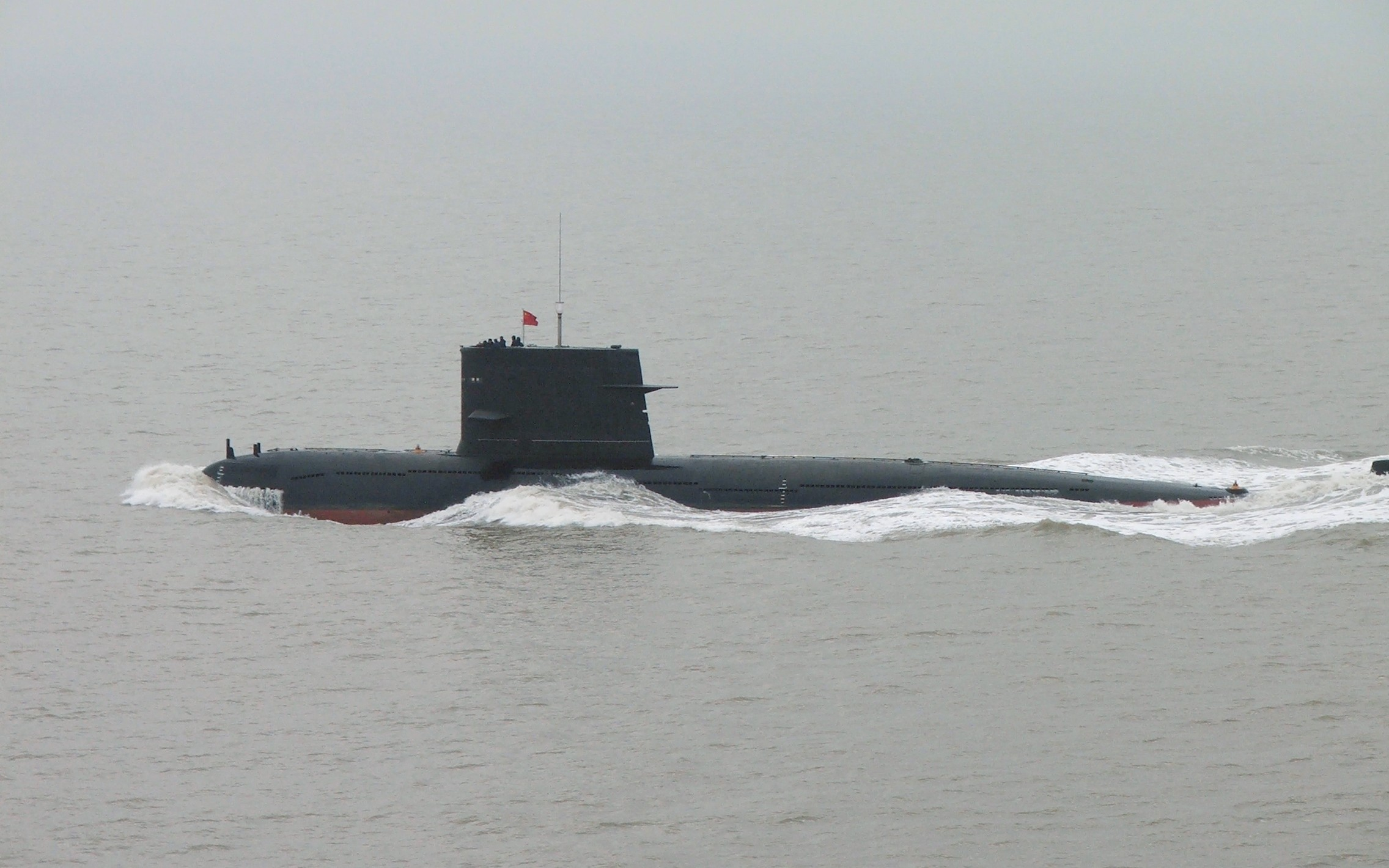
Type 039 submarine.

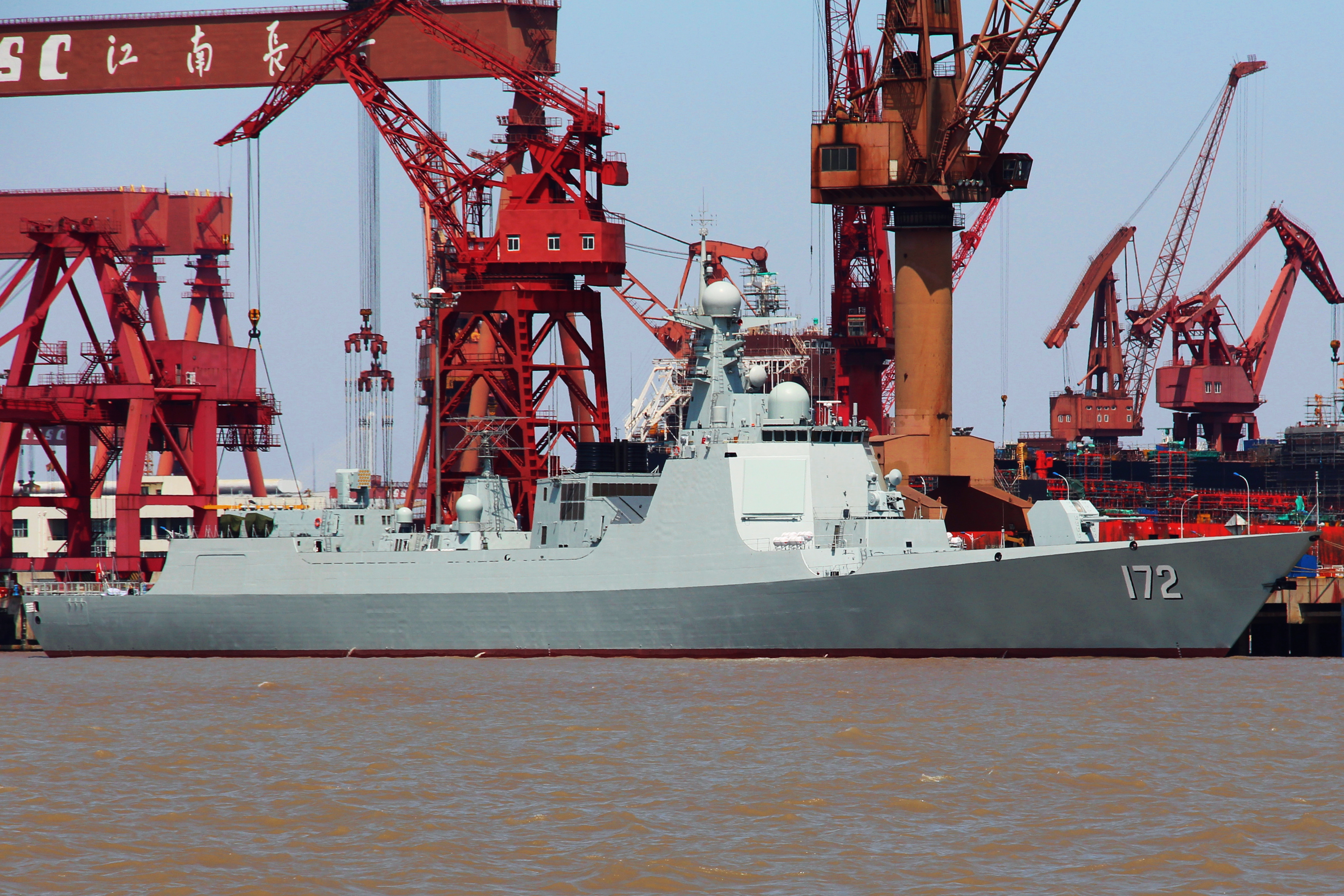
Kunming (DDG-172).

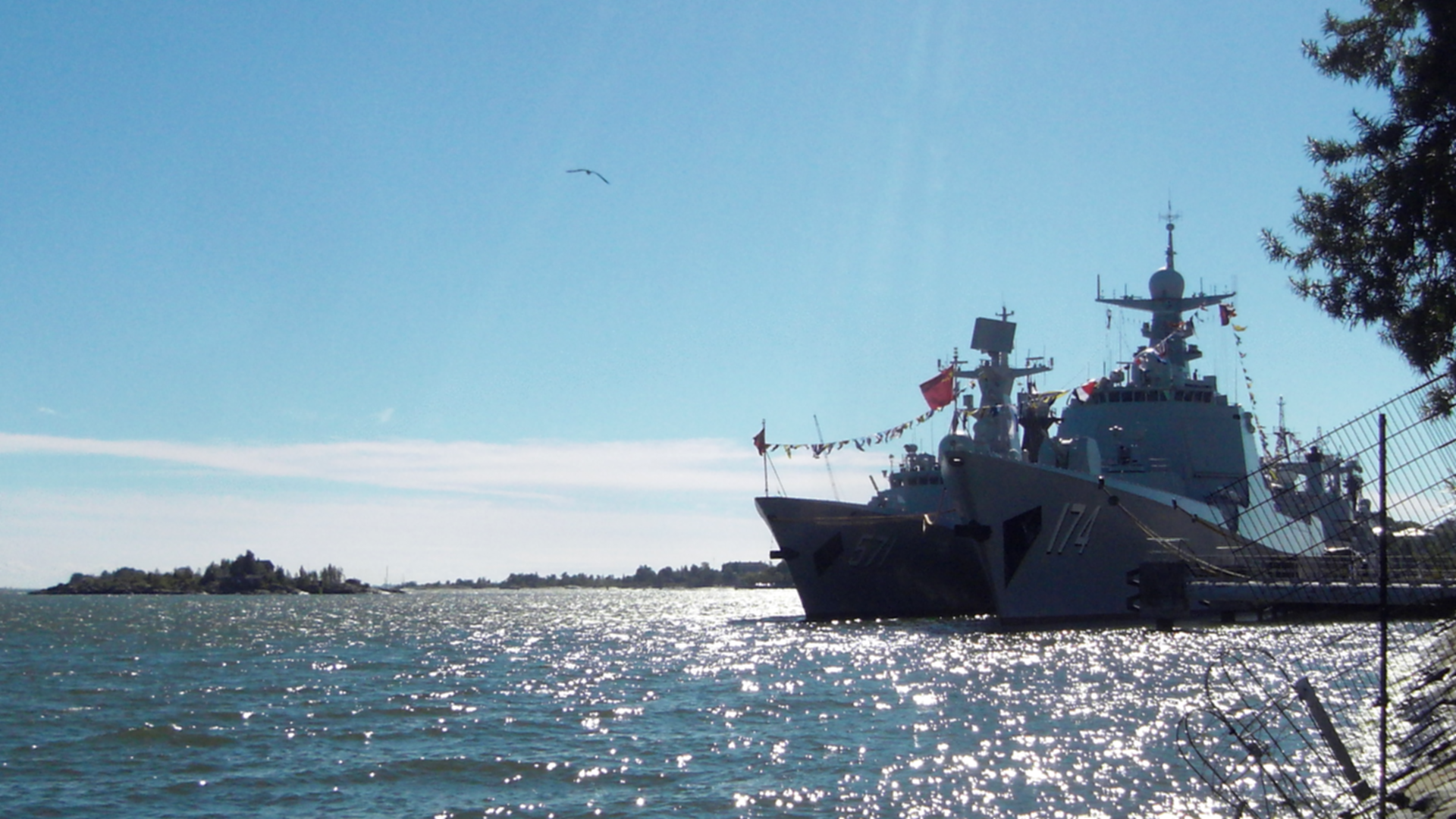
Hefei (DDG-174).

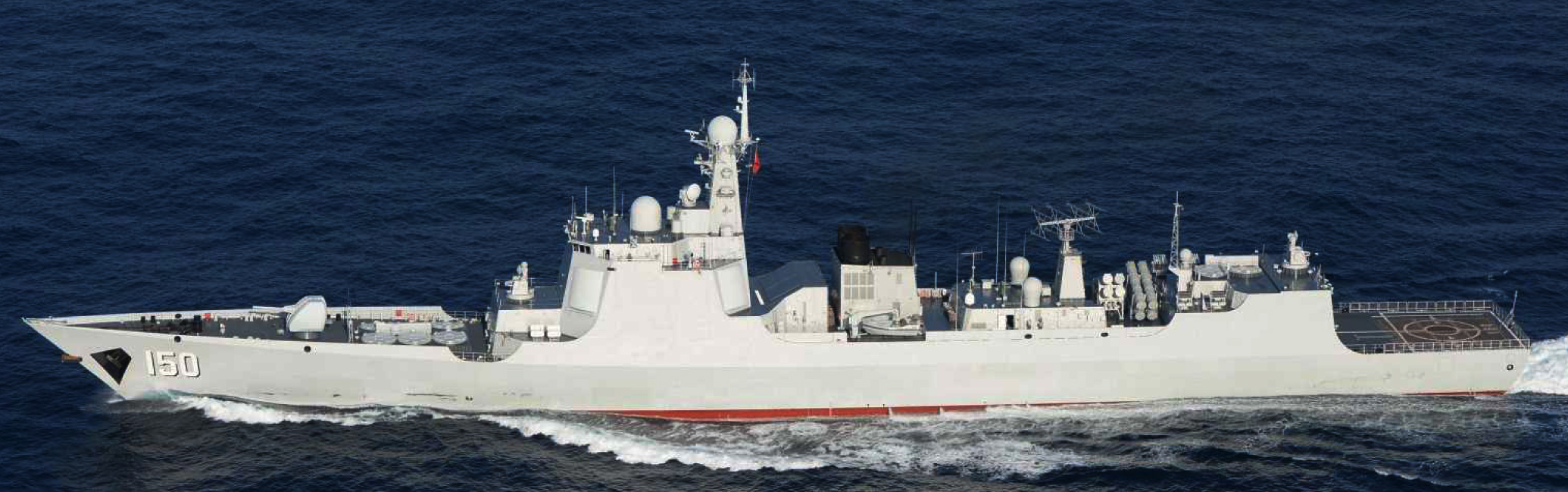
Changchun (DDG-150).

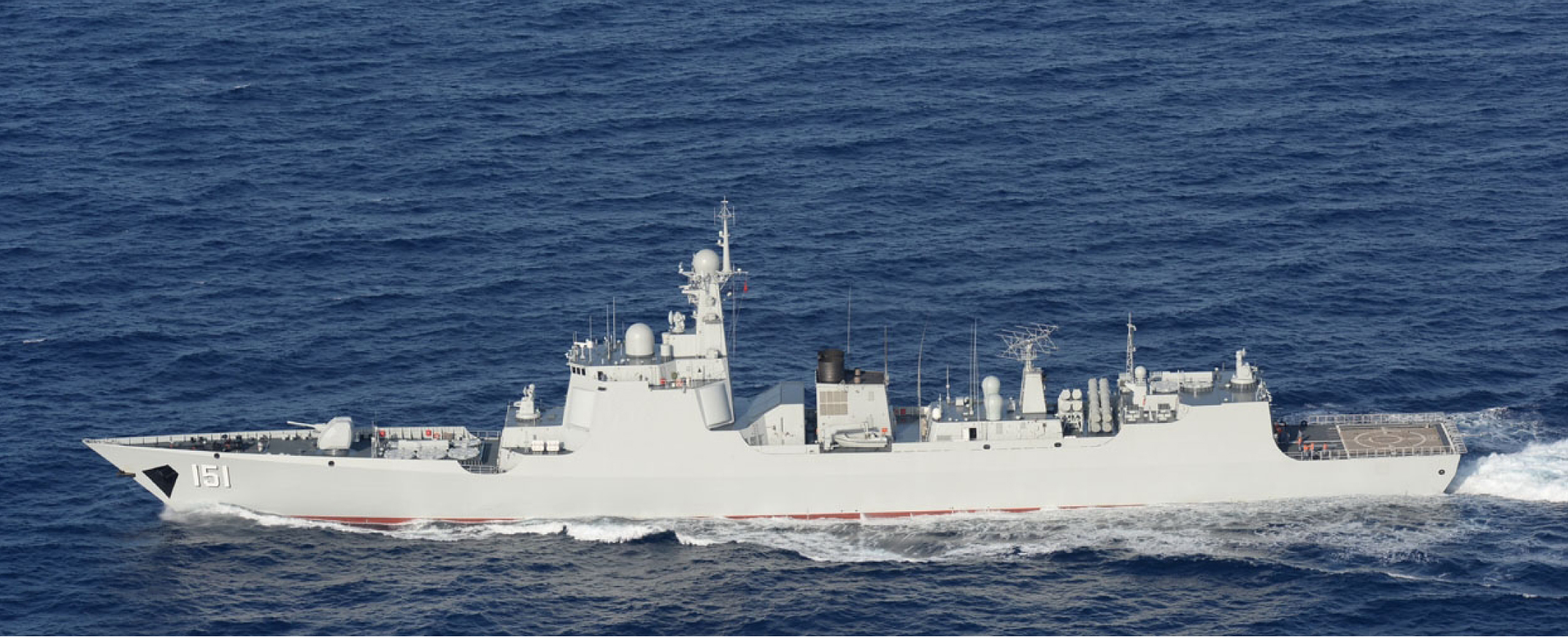
Zhengzhou (DDG-151).

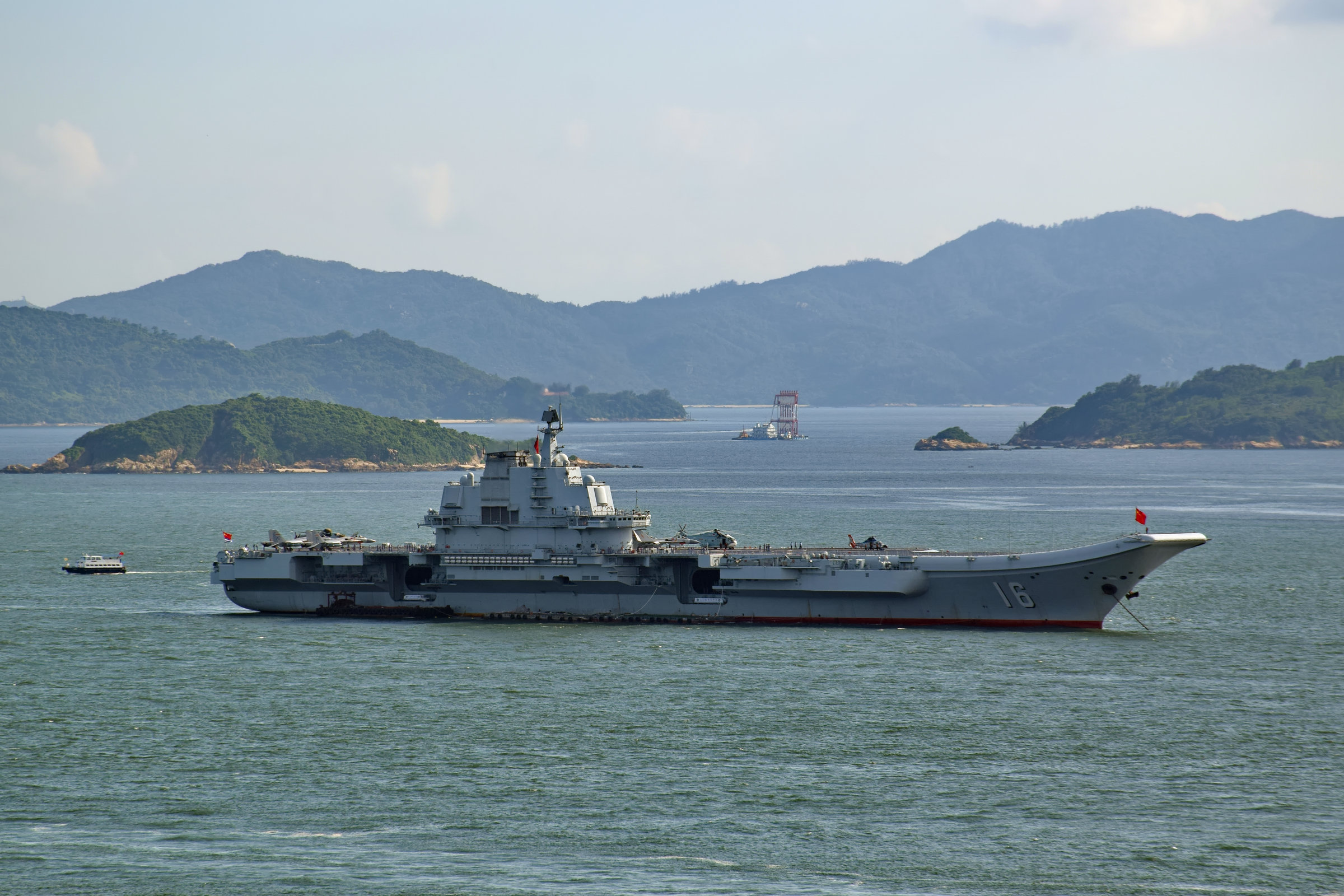
Chinese aircraft carrier Liaoning.

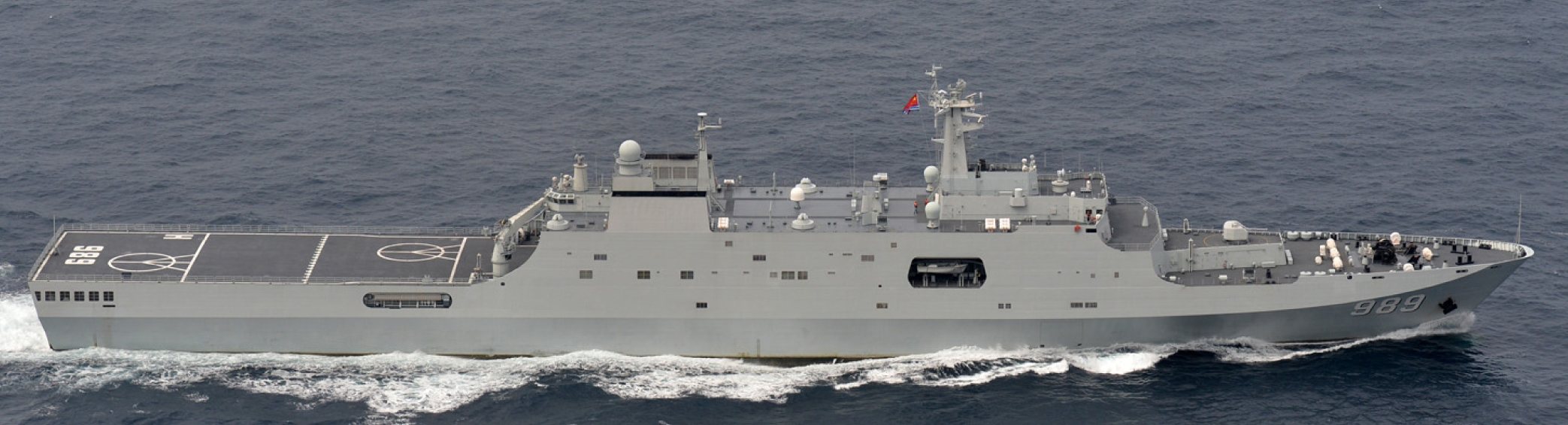
Changbai Shan (LPD-989).

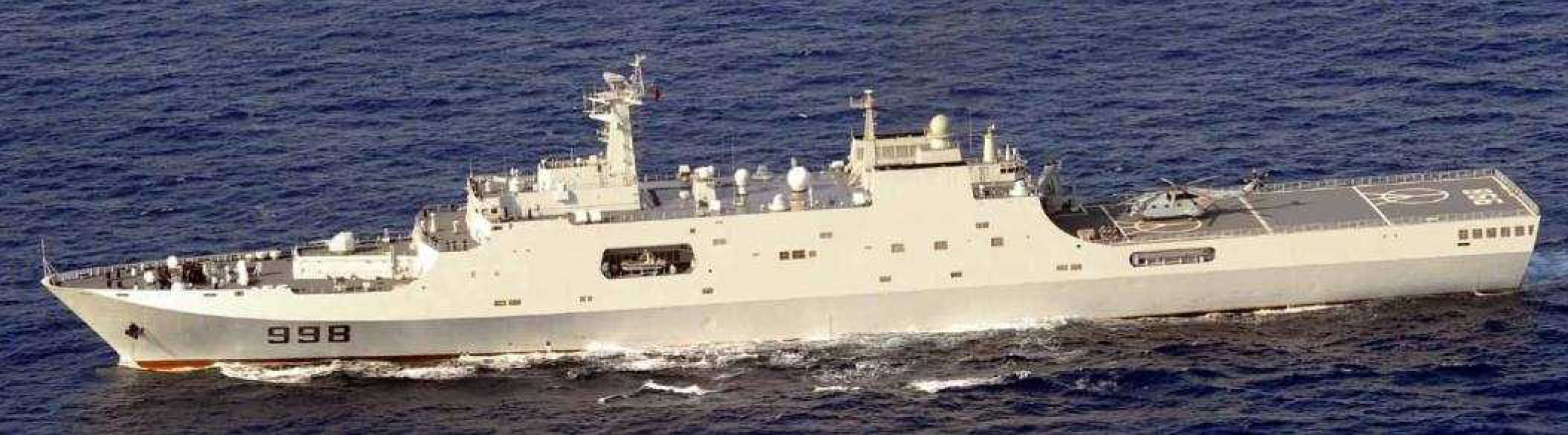
Kunlunshan (LPD-998)
