= Balzam-class intelligence ship =

Soviet and Russian ship class

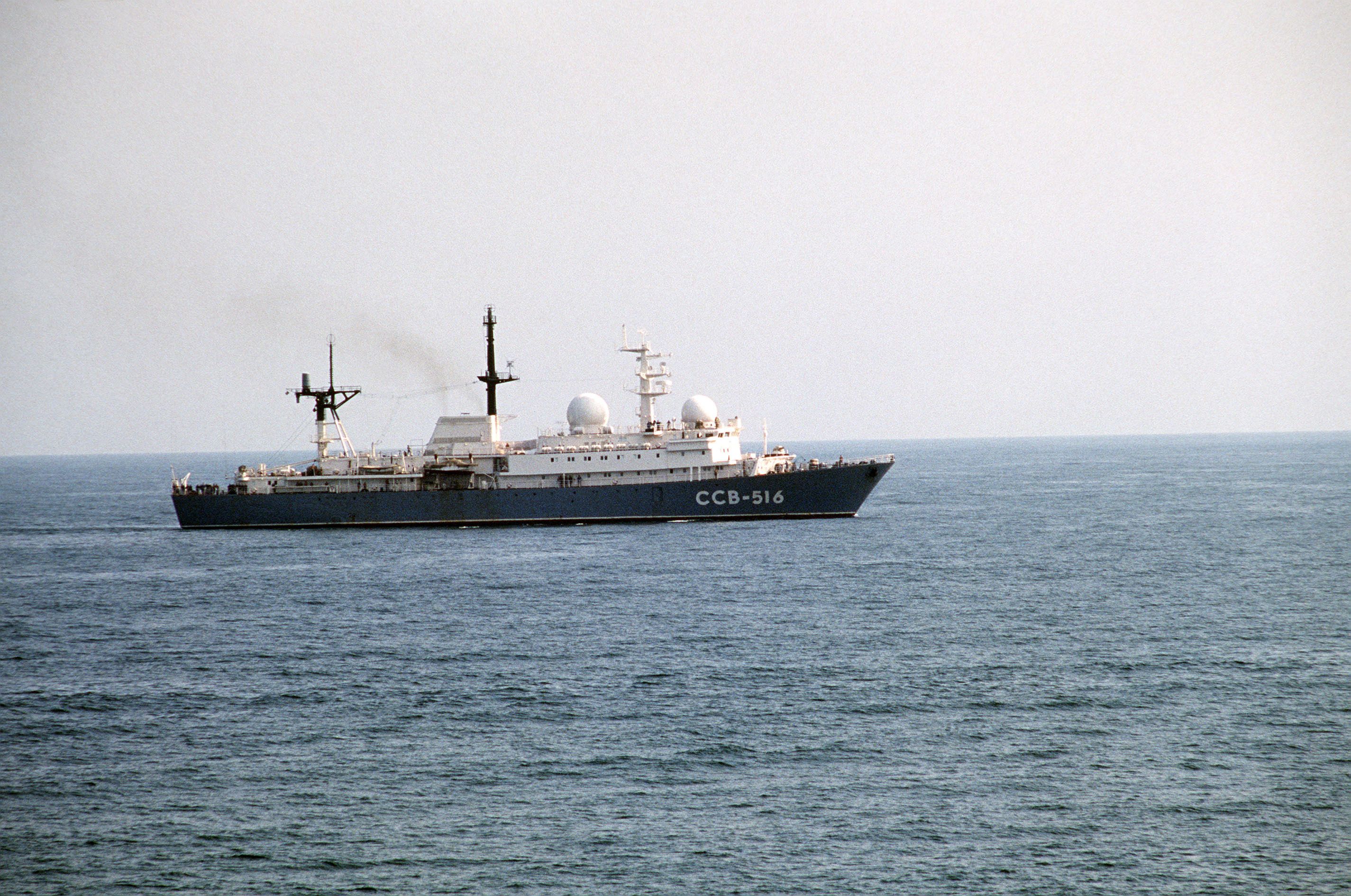
- A starboard view of the Soviet Balzam-class general intelligence collector ship underway in international waters as United States Navy ships sail out from Norfolk, Virginia, at the beginning of NATO Exercise Ocean Safari '85.

Class overview
- Builders: Yantar Yard Kaliningrad
- Operators: Soviet Navy; Russian Navy
- Preceded by: Primor'ye-class surveillance ship
- Succeeded by: Vishnya-class intelligence ship
- Built: 1980–1986
- In commission: 1980–1987
- Planned: 4
- Completed: 4
- Active: 1
- Laid up: 2
- Retired: 1

General characteristics
- Type: intelligence ship
- Displacement: 4,900 tons full load
- Length: 105 m (344 ft)
- Beam: 15.5 m (51 ft)
- Draught: 5 m (16 ft)
- Propulsion: 2 shaft diesel 9,000 hp (6,700 kW)
- Speed: 20 knots (37 km/h)
- Complement: 220
- Sensors & processing systems: Sonar: MG-349 hull mounted array, MG-13 underwater communications, MG-7
- Electronic warfare & decoys: Cage Pot I, Twin Wheel, Log Maze
- Armament: 2 × 4 9K32 Strela-2 positions, 1 × 30 mm AK-630 anti-aircraft gun, 1×7 55 mm MRG-1 grenade launcher

The Balzam class, Soviet designation Project 1826 is a class of intelligence collection ships built in the Soviet Union for the Soviet Navy during the 1980s. They are also known as Lira class, after the first vessel of the class.

== Design and role ==
Built by the Yantar shipyard in Kaliningrad, they are the first Soviet vessels specifically designed to gather SIGINT electronic intelligence via an extensive array of sensors. The data could be transmitted to shore via satellite link antennas housed in two large radomes. They were the first Soviet AGIs to be armed, carrying one AK-630 CIWS gun system and Strela anti-aircraft missiles.

The last remaining Balzam class ship in active service is 344 ft in length, mounting a Medium Frequency sonar, High Frequency dipping sonar, Electronic warfare gear to include jammers, interception devices and code-breaking software. These ships were revolutionary when built in that they carried not only intercept and direction-finding electronics but also the necessary computing power to feed raw signal data into on-board information processing computers.

The ships has underway replenishment system same as two four-round Strela-2M (SA-N-5 Grail) IR-Guided SAM's and a single six-barrelled 30 mm gun installed. The weapons rely on a single remote Kolonka pedestal director instead of fire control radars, presumably to avoid interfering with the electronic support suite.

== Ships ==
Name	Hull No.	Builder	Laid down	Launched	Commissioned	Fleet	Status
Lira	516	Yantar Shipyard, Kaliningrad			9 February 1980	Northern Fleet	Decommissioned in 1997
Azia	493	Yantar Shipyard, Kaliningrad			13 February 1981	Pacific Fleet	Decommissioned
Pribaltica	80	Yantar Shipyard, Kaliningrad			28 July 1984	Pacific Fleet	Active
Belomore	463	Yantar Shipyard, Kaliningrad			7 February 1987	Northern Fleet	In reserve

== Operations ==
In July 2016, SSV-80 was deployed to monitor the RIMPAC 2016 naval exercises off Hawaii. The United States Coast Guard spotted the same ship south of Oahu in March 2020.

She was also deployed in May of 2022, presumably to observe the USS Ronald Reagan and her battle group as they deployed from their Japanese homeport.

== See also ==
- List of ships of the Soviet Navy
- List of ships of Russia by project number
