= Spanish intelligence ship Alerta =

Spanish spy ship

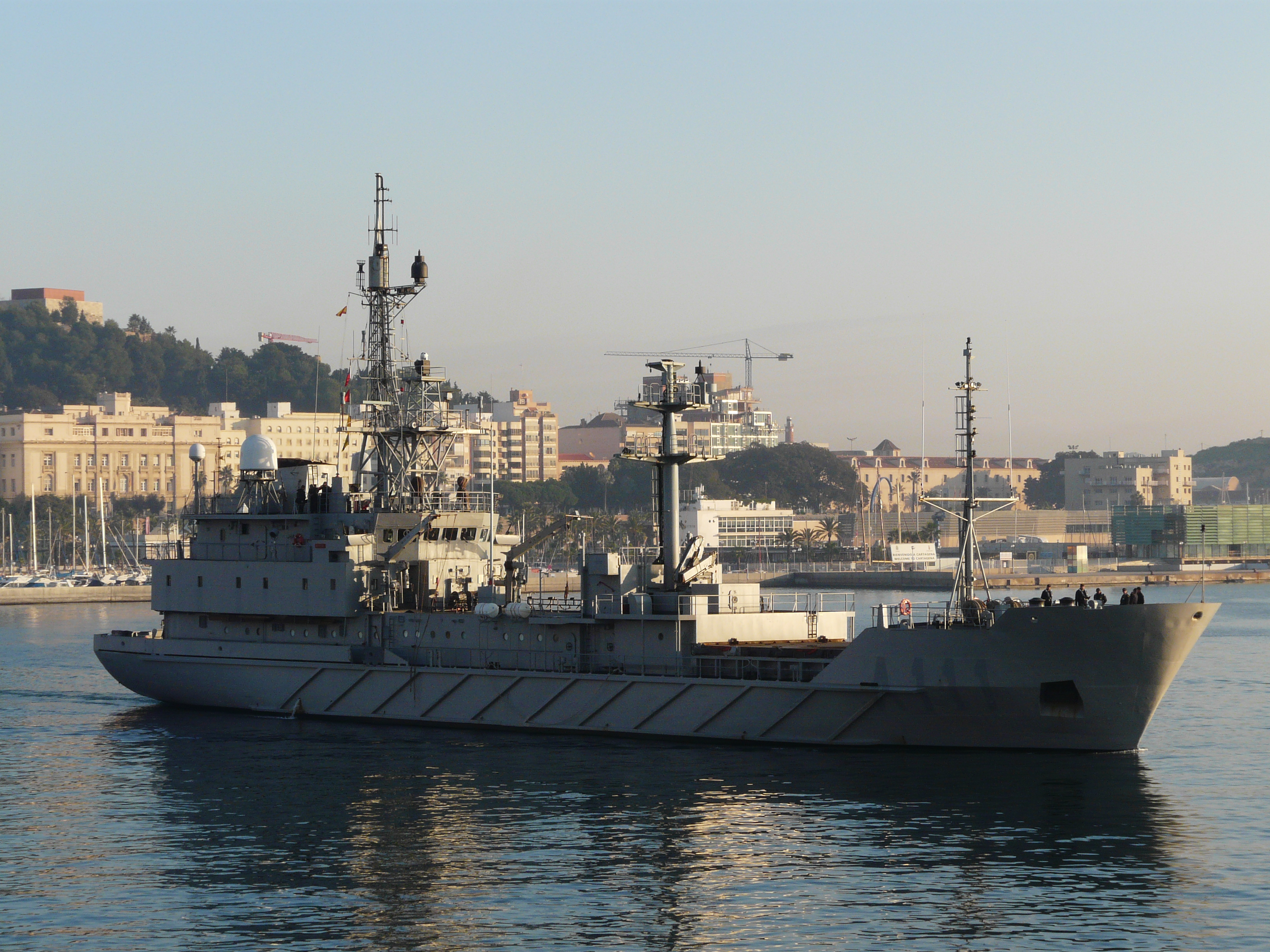
- Alerta in 2008

History

East Germany
- Name: Jasmund
- Builder: Neptunwerft
- Commissioned: 10 May 1985
- Decommissioned: 1992
- Identification: D41
- Fate: Sold to Spain in 1992

Spain
- Name: Alerta
- Cost: €43,200
- Acquired: 1992
- Commissioned: 21 December 1992
- Identification: A-111
- Motto: Quisquam in quo confidere

General characteristics
- Class & type: Darss (Projekt 602)
- Displacement: 2,292 t (2,256 long tons) (full load); 1,800 t (1,800 long tons) (empty)
- Length: 76.5 m (251 ft 0 in)
- Beam: 12.3 m (40 ft 4 in)
- Propulsion: 1 × Bazán-Caterpillar 3606; 2,760 hp (2,060 kW); 1 × variable-pitch propeller; 1 × auxiliary electric engine
- Speed: 12 knots (22 km/h; 14 mph)
- Range: 11,000 nmi (20,000 km; 13,000 mi)
- Complement: 61
- Sensors & processing systems: Kelvin Hughes 1106 surface and navigation radar
- Armament: 2 × 12.7 mm (0.50 in) Browning machine guns; 2 × 7.62 mm (0.300 in) machine guns

Alerta is the only intelligence gathering ship operated by the Spanish Navy. It has been so since 1992 when the ship was bought from Germany. Prior to that the ship, then named Jasmund, had been operating for the Volksmarine until the German reunification.

According to the Spanish Navy, the ship is based at Cartagena Naval Base, as a member of the Maritime Action Unit.

== Mission ==
Official communications for the Spanish Navy lists Alerta's mission as: "Logistic transport between national and international ports, as well as exercising sovereignty and protecting our national maritime interests".

However, given the nature of the ship's equipment, it is widely known that Alerta also performs eavesdropping missions mainly along the Maghreb analyzing electromagnetic signals between 1 and 40 GHz. Additionally, a modular electronic suit allows the ship to fulfill other missions for different branches of both the Spanish military and allied nations.

== History ==
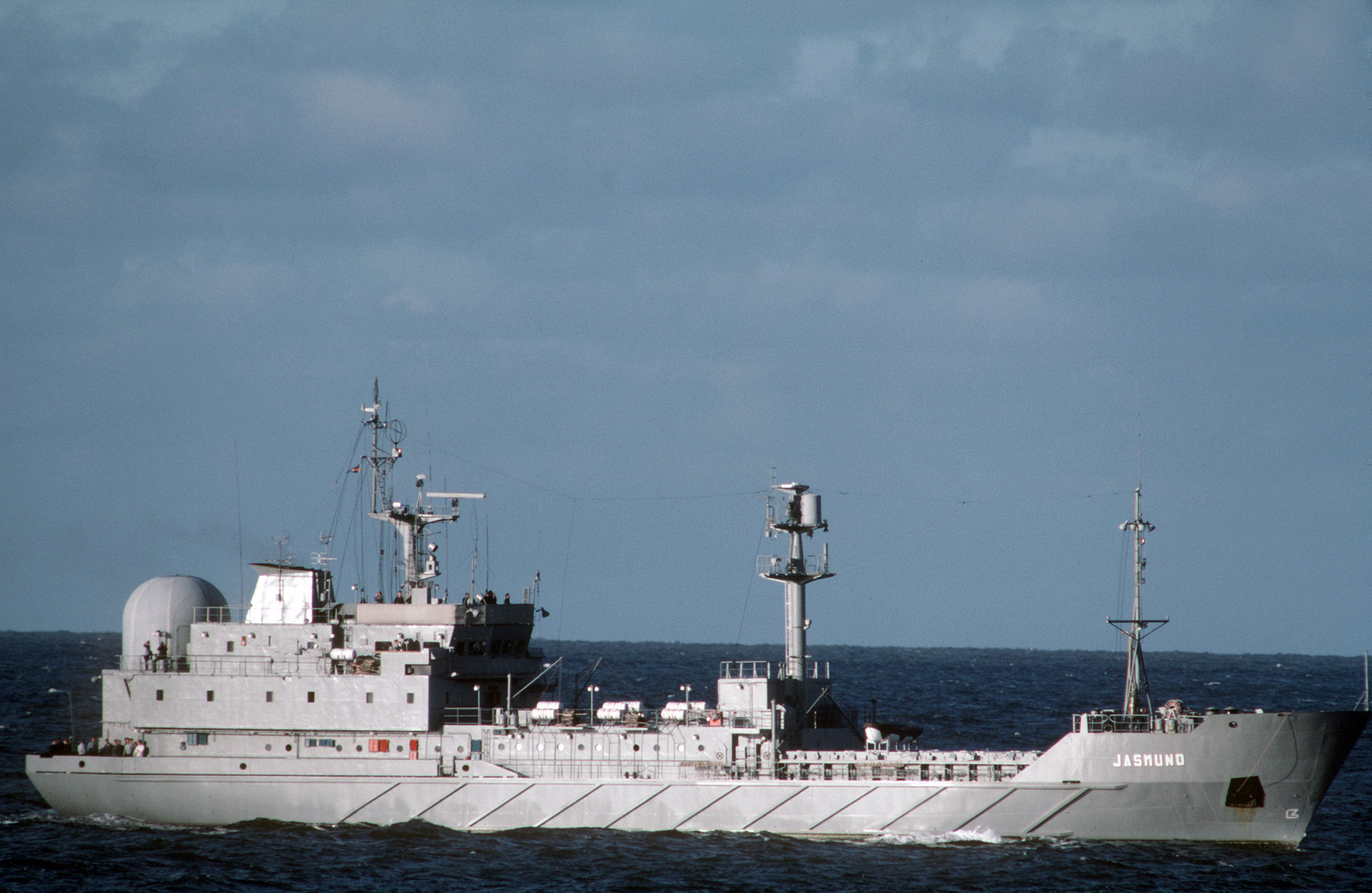
Jasmund in 1986

The ship was the last of the five Darss-class transport ships build by Neptun Werft in East Germany during the 1980s. Later, it was refurbished as an intelligence gathering ship for the Volksmarine. After the German Reunification the ship was mothballed and offered for sale or scrap.

Ecuador took interest in the ship but when the deal fell off the ship was offered to Spain who paid €24/tonne. It was brought to Gran Canaria where the ship was refurbished and given its current name. Since then it has been operating as an ELINT ship replacing the patrol craft Alsedo.

== Future ==
Given the ship's age and technological limitations it has been widely speculated about its replacement in the near future. One particular project considered the refurbishment of a Meteoro-class offshore patrol vessel currently operating for the Spanish Navy into the ELINT and SIGINT roles Alerta is fulfilling.
