= Primor'ye-class surveillance ship =

Russian navy surveillance ships

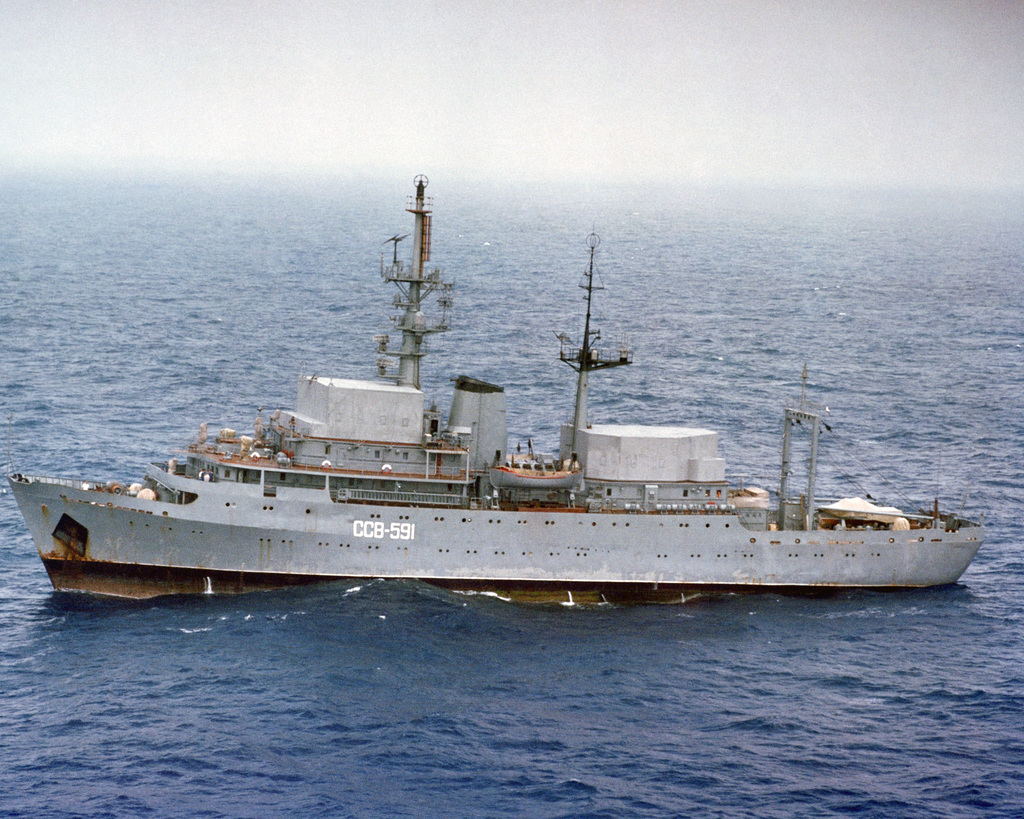
- Port view of the Soviet Primorye Class intelligence ship

Class overview
- Builders: 61 Kommunara Zavod, Nikolayev, Ukraine
- Operators: Soviet Navy, Russian Navy
- Succeeded by: Balzam-class intelligence ship
- Built: 1969-1973
- In commission: 1970 ? - present day
- Completed: 6
- Active: 2
- Retired: 4

General characteristics
- Type: Intelligence collection ship
- Displacement: 4,340 tons full load
- Length: 84.6 m
- Beam: 14 m
- Draught: 7.2 m
- Propulsion: 1 shaft, 2 diesel engines, 2000 hp
- Speed: 12.5 knots

The Primor'ye class are a group of spy ships built for the Soviet Navy. Two ships are operated by the Russian Navy. The Soviet designation was Project 394B.

== Design and role ==
The ships were designed to gather SIGINT and COMINT electronic intelligence via an extensive array of sensors. The data could be transmitted to shore via satellite link antennas. The ships were converted from the hulls of large trawlers.

== Ships ==
Two ships are in service with the Black Sea Fleet:

- SSV-590 Krym
- SSV-591 Kavkaz

Four further ships were retired in the mid-to-late 1990s.

== See also ==
- List of ships of the Soviet Navy
- List of ships of Russia by project number
