= Hibiki-class surveillance ship =

Japanese naval ship class

Hibiki-class ocean surveillance ship
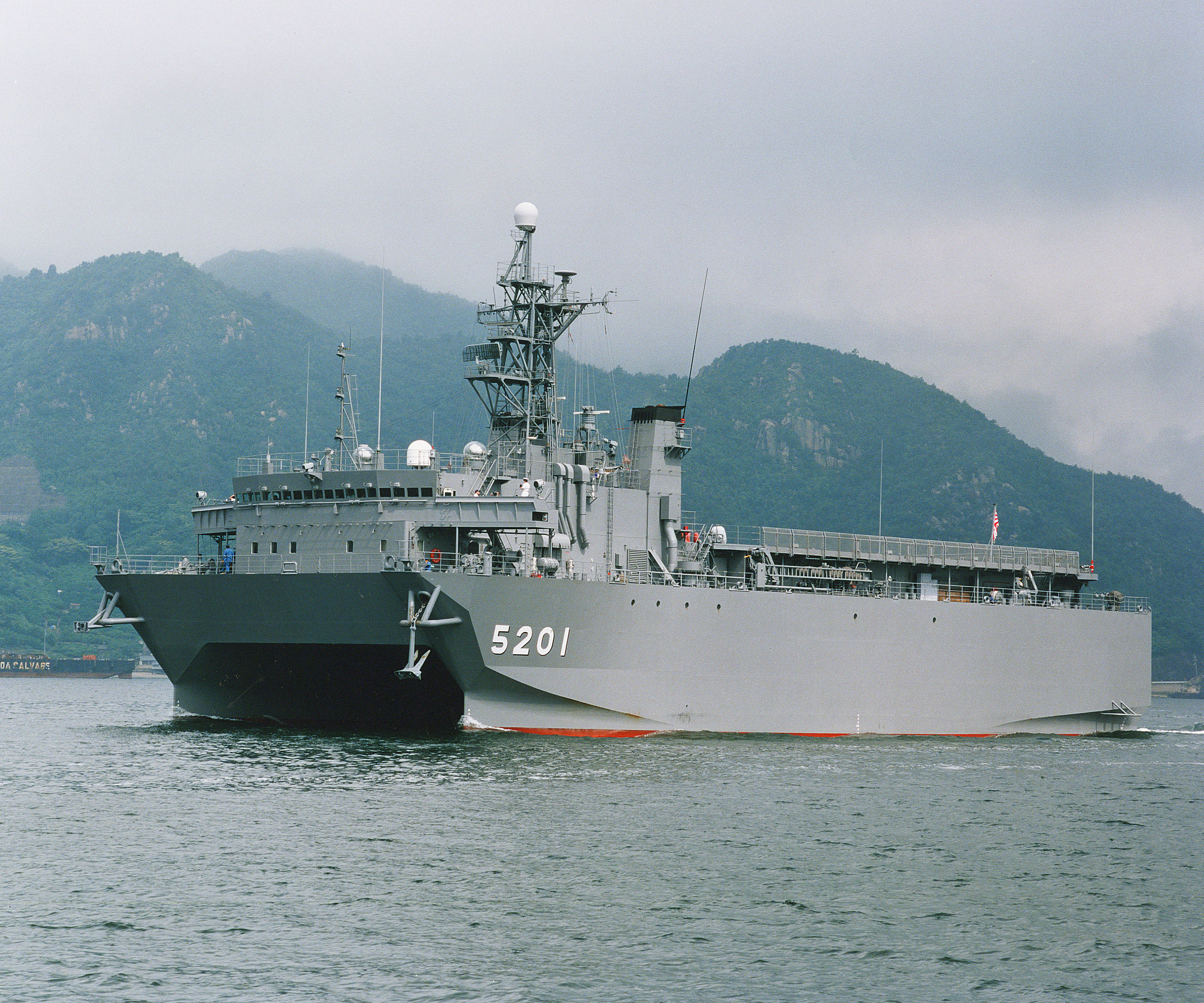
- JS Hibiki

Class overview
- Builders: Mitsui Engineering & Shipbuilding
- Operators: Japan Maritime Self-Defense Force
- Built: 1989–2026
- In commission: 1991–present
- Planned: 4
- Completed: 4
- Active: 4

General characteristics
- Type: Ocean surveillance ship
- Displacement: Standard: 2,850 t (2,800 long tons; 3,140 short tons) (Hibiki and Harima); 2,900 t (2,900 long tons; 3,200 short tons) (Aki and Bingo); Full load: 3,800 t (3,700 long tons; 4,200 short tons)
- Length: 67 m (219 ft 10 in)
- Beam: 29.9 m (98 ft 1 in)
- Draft: 7.5 m (24 ft 7 in)
- Installed power: 3,000 hp (2,200 kW)
- Propulsion: 4 x Mitsubishi S6U-MPTK diesel engines; 2 x shafts
- Speed: 11 kn (20 km/h; 13 mph)
- Range: 3,800 nmi (7,000 km; 4,400 mi) (at 10 kn (19 km/h; 12 mph))
- Crew: 40
- Sensors & processing systems: OPS-18-1 surface search; OPS-29 for navigation; OPS-26 for navigation; AN/UQQ-2 towed array sonar
- Aviation facilities: Helipad

The Hibiki-class ocean surveillance ship is a class of surveillance ships operated by the Japan Maritime Self-Defense Force (JMSDF). The ships have a small-waterplane-area twin hull (SWATH) design.

== History ==
The Hibiki class was developed in response to the launch of the Kilo-class submarines by the Soviet Union, and their deployments in the waters near Japan. The Defense Agency announced plans to develop a surveillance ship in 1989.

The first Hibiki-class vessel was commissioned on 23 January 1991 and the second, Harima, on 10 March 1992.

The Japanese Ministry of Defence's decision to build another Hibiki-class surveillance ship, nearly 30 years after the second one was completed, was influenced by the fact that some of Japan's neighbors have been steadily expanding their respective submarine fleets recently.

== Construction ==
The first three vessels of the class have been built by Mitsui Engineering & Shipbuilding at its Tamano shipyard.

== Operations ==
Hibiki and Harima operate out of Kure, Hiroshima. The United States and Japan reportedly split the costs of operating the Hibiki vessels, which is approximately US$20 million per year.

== Characteristics ==
Hibiki-class vessels have a beam of 30 metres (98 ft 5 in), a top speed of 11 knots (20 km/h; 13 mph), and a standard range of 3,800 nautical miles (7,000 km; 4,400 mi). Each vessel has a crew of 40, including five American civilian technicians, and a flight deck for helicopters to operate off of. They are able to deploy on station for 90 days.

The vessels have an AN/UQQ-2 Surveillance Towed Array Sensor System (SURTASS), which was installed in the United States. Data from the sensors is relayed through the Defense Satellite Communications System and processed and shared with the United States. The data is fed into the Integrated Undersea Surveillance System.

Propulsion is provided by four Mitsubishi S6U-MPTK diesel electric engines. The third ship was equipped with a Daihatsu diesel MTU.

== Ships in the class ==
Pennant no.	Name	Laid down	Launched	Commissioned	Home port	Notes
AOS-5201	Hibiki	28 November 1989	27 July 1990	30 January 1991	Kure	
AOS-5202	Harima	26 December 1990	11 September 1991	10 March 1992	Kure	
AOS-5203	Aki	October 2018	15 January 2020	4 March 2021		
AOS-5204	Bingo	March 2024	17 February 2025	6 March 2026		
