= Vishnya-class intelligence ship =

Spy ship class

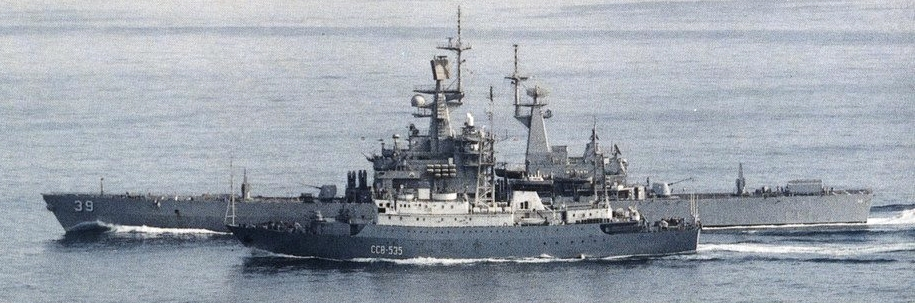
- SSV-535 Kareliya (foreground) and USS Texas in 1988

Class overview
- Builders: Stocznia Północna, Gdańsk, Poland
- Operators: Soviet Navy; Russian Navy
- Preceded by: Balzam class
- Succeeded by: Yury Ivanov class
- In commission: 1985–present
- Planned: 7
- Completed: 7
- Active: 7

General characteristics
- Type: Intelligence collection ship
- Displacement: 3,470 tons full load
- Length: 91.5 m (300 ft 2 in)
- Beam: 14.6 m (47 ft 11 in)
- Draught: 4.5 m (14 ft 9 in)
- Propulsion: 2 shafts, 2x Zgoda Sulzer 12AV 25/30 diesel engines, 4,400 bhp (3,300 kW)
- Speed: 16 knots (30 km/h)
- Complement: 146 (= 6 passengers)
- Sensors & processing systems: Radar: MR-212/201 (Palm Frond) Sonar: MG-349, MGP-303
- Electronic warfare & decoys: Various intercept arrays and radio direction finding equipment
- Armament: 2 AK-630 six-barreled Gatling 30 mm/L60 guns; 2 SA-N-8 surface-to-air missiles

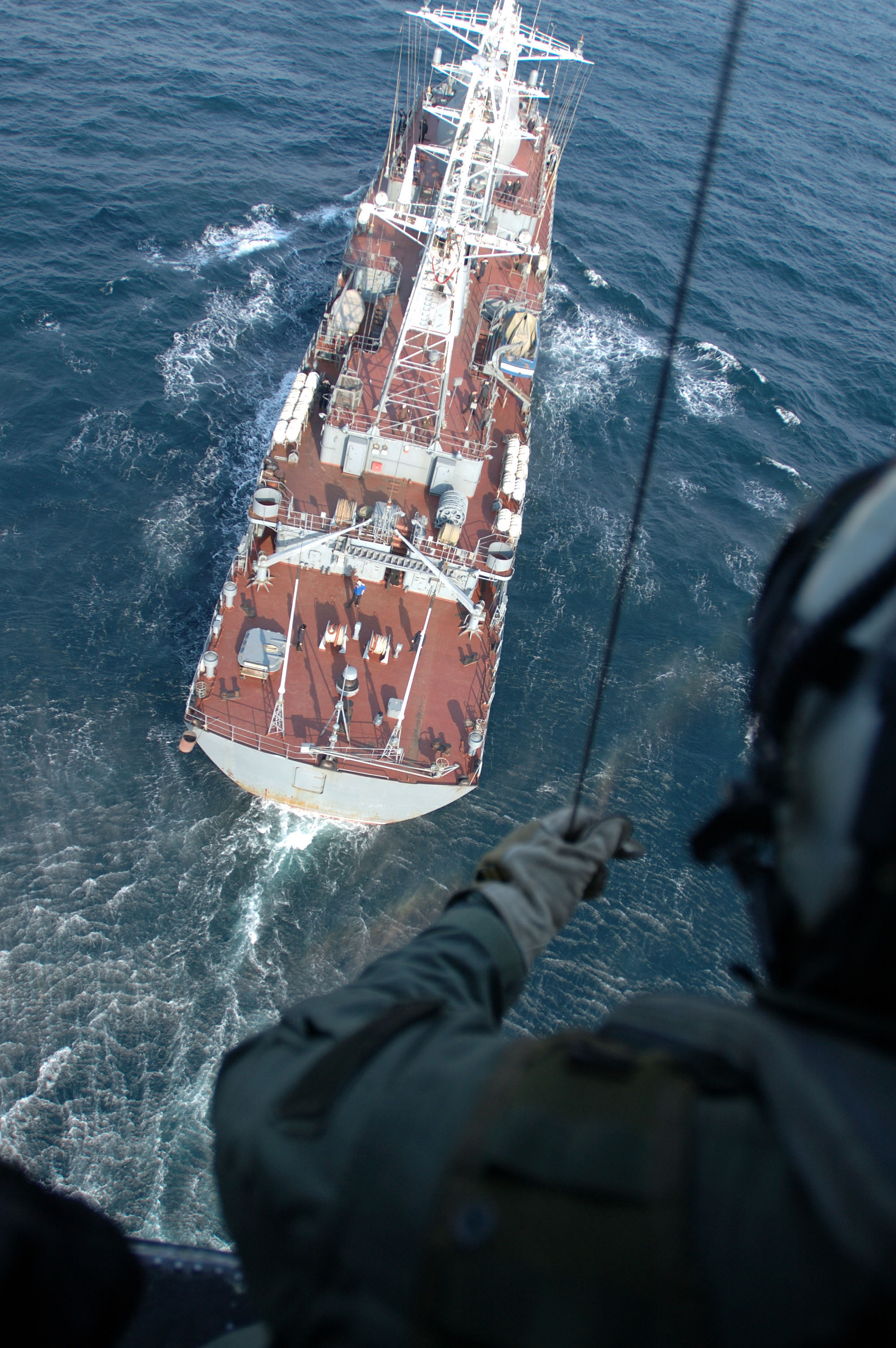
SSV-208 Kurily in 2005

The Vishnya class (NATO reporting name) (also known as the Meridian class), Soviet designation Project 864, are a group of intelligence collection ships built for the Soviet Navy in the 1980s. The ships continue in service with the Russian Navy. The Russian Navy operates seven of these ships.

== Design ==
These ships are large, purpose built ships designed for signals intelligence gathering via an extensive array of sensors. The data could be transmitted to shore via satellite link antennas housed in two large radomes. The ships are armed with two AK-630 close-in weapon systems and SA-N-8 surface-to-air missile (SAM) launchers, for last resort self-defense.

== Operations ==
On September 23, 2012, SSV Viktor Leonov was at dock in Havana. Other ships visited in 2013.

On February 27, 2014, SSV Viktor Leonov docked in Havana’s cruise ship area, the same day Defense Minister Sergei Shoigu announced that Russia would establish permanent bases in Cuba, Vietnam, Nicaragua, Singapore, and the Seychelle islands.

Vasily Tatishchev was deployed to the Eastern Mediterranean Sea on 5 October 2015 to monitor the conflict in Syria.

On January 20, 2015, SSV Viktor Leonov was at dock in Havana.

On February 15, 2017, CNN reported that SSV Viktor Leonov, a Russian spy ship was sitting 30 miles (48 km) off the coast of Connecticut. This is the farthest north the Russian spy vessel has ever ventured, according to US defense officials. CNN later reported that Viktor Leonov, which conducted similar patrols in 2014 and 2015, was off the coast of Delaware, but typically she only travels as far north as Virginia. The ship is based with Russia's Northern Fleet but had stopped over in Cuba before conducting her patrol along the Atlantic Coast and is expected to return there following her latest mission. She was spotted operating off the coast of South Carolina and Georgia in December 2019. The United States Coast Guard at the time published a MSIB alleging unsafe operations being performed in that area, including running without navigation lights, and failing to respond to hails. The ship is outfitted with a variety of high-tech interception equipment and is designed to intercept signals intelligence. The official said that the US Navy was "keeping a close eye on it.".

In the documentary series Warship: Life at Sea, filmed aboard Royal Navy type 23 frigate HMS Northumberland in Autumn 2020, SSV Viktor Leonov is featured loitering off the British coast where she was suspected to be attempting to surveil a US Navy submarine en route to a British port. The Duke-class frigate took up a defensive posture between the two vessels and employed noise-making countermeasures to interfere with intelligence gathering. On the same patrol, Northumberland was involved in a further incident while tracking an unnamed Russian SSN, when the submarine collided with the frigate's towed-array sonar.

On November 14, 2025, the U.S. Coast Guard informed that the russian spy ship Kareliya was spotted 15 nautical miles south of Oahu on October 29, 2025. The ship has been monitored for several days by Coast Guard sea and air assets.

== Ships ==
Name	Hull No.	Laid down	Launched	Commissioned	Fleet	Status	Notes
Fedor Golovin (ex-Meridian)	520			14 November 1985	Baltic Fleet	Active	
Kareliya	535			5 July 1986	Pacific Fleet	Active as of 2026	Spotted near Hawaii in October 2025
Tavriya	169			17 January 1987	Northern Fleet	In reserve	Part donor for Viktor Leonov
Priazovye	201			12 June 1987	Black Sea Fleet	Active as of 2023	Reportedly thwarted drone attack in June 2023 while protecting gas pipelines in the southeastern Black Sea
Kurily	208			16 October 1987	Pacific Fleet	Active as of 2026	
Vasiliy Tatishchev (ex-Pelengator)	231		27 November 1987	23 July 1988	Baltic Fleet	Active as of 2026	In 2021 deployed to the Red Sea, in July 2022 to the Adriatic Sea, July 2026 in the North Sea
Viktor Leonov (ex-Odograf)	175			1988	Northern Fleet	Active as of 2026	In 2019–2020 active off U.S. and U.K., docks in Havana

== See also ==
- List of ships of the Soviet Navy
- List of ships of Russia by project number
