= Yury Ivanov-class intelligence ship =

Russian intelligence collection ship

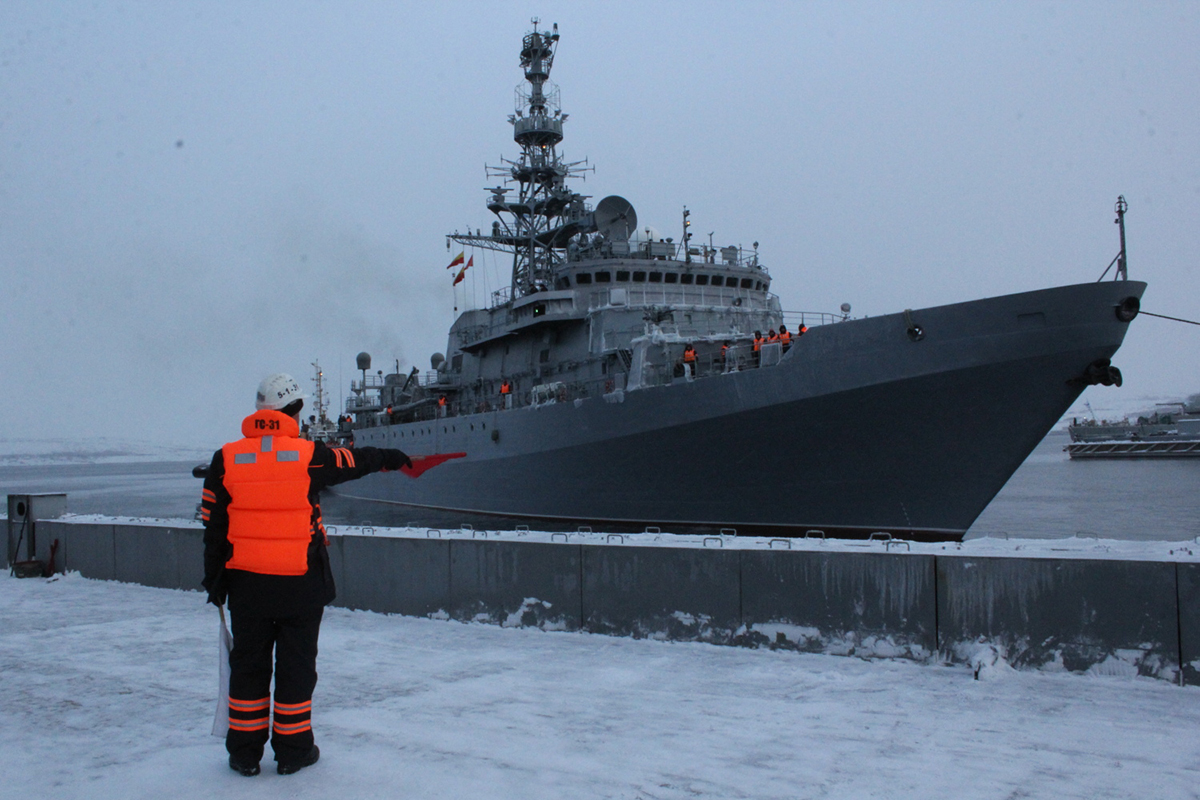
- Yury Ivanov in 2019

Class overview
- Builders: Severnaya Verf, Sankt Petersburg
- Operators: Russian Navy
- Preceded by: Vishnya class
- Built: 2004–present
- In commission: 2015–present
- Planned: 4
- Completed: 2
- Active: 2

General characteristics
- Type: Intelligence collection ship
- Displacement: 4,000 tons full load
- Length: 95 m (311 ft 8 in)
- Beam: 16 m (52 ft 6 in)
- Draught: 4 m (13 ft 1 in)
- Propulsion: 2 × 11D42 diesel
- Speed: 20 kn
- Range: 8,000 mi (13,000 km)
- Complement: 120-131
- Armament: 4 × MTPU 14.5mm marine machine-gun installation; 6 × 9K38 Igla Man-portable air-defense system launchers

The Yuriy Ivanov class (Project 18280) is a type of Russian SIGINT intelligence collection ship. The ship is designed by the JSC Central Design Bureau "Iceberg". The displacement of the ship is more than 4,000 tons, the cruising range not less than 8,000 miles (13,000 km) and its armament consists of light anti-aircraft weapons. The ship on its performance characteristics and capabilities is considerably superior to similar vessels of previous generations mainly due to the versatility and high level of automation and systems integration. The vessels of this class are designed for providing communication. The first ship, Yuriy Ivanov, was laid down in 2004 and was launched on 30 September 2013. The second ship, Ivan Khurs, was launched on 16 May 2017. Russia originally planned to build at least four such ships by 2020, but this date was later pushed back to 2025.

A new contract for medium sized intelligence ships (such as project 18280) was signed at Army 2021 forum, possibly for Yury Ivanov-class ships.

== Operational history ==
In late May 2023, during the military invasion of Ukraine, Russia stated that the Ivan Khurs had been engaged by uncrewed surface vessels (USVs) belonging to Ukraine, with at least one USV being destroyed by weapons on board. Ukrainian defence intelligence confirmed the strike and said one of the drones had made contact with its target. On 25 May 2023, a video appeared which shows a USV reaching the ship within a few metres, after which the video feed cuts out. It is likely the USV detonated in very close proximity to the ship. However, the ship was later recorded returning to port with limited apparent damage.

== Ships ==
Name	Builders	Laid down	Launched	Commissioned	Fleet	Status
Yuriy Ivanov	Severnaya Verf, St. Petersburg	27 December 2004	30 September 2013	26 July 2015	Northern Fleet	Active as of 2026
Ivan Khurs	Severnaya Verf, St. Petersburg	14 November 2013	16 May 2017	25 June 2018	Black Sea Fleet	Active, hit by uncrewed vessel in 2023 and reportedly again in April 2026

== Gallery ==
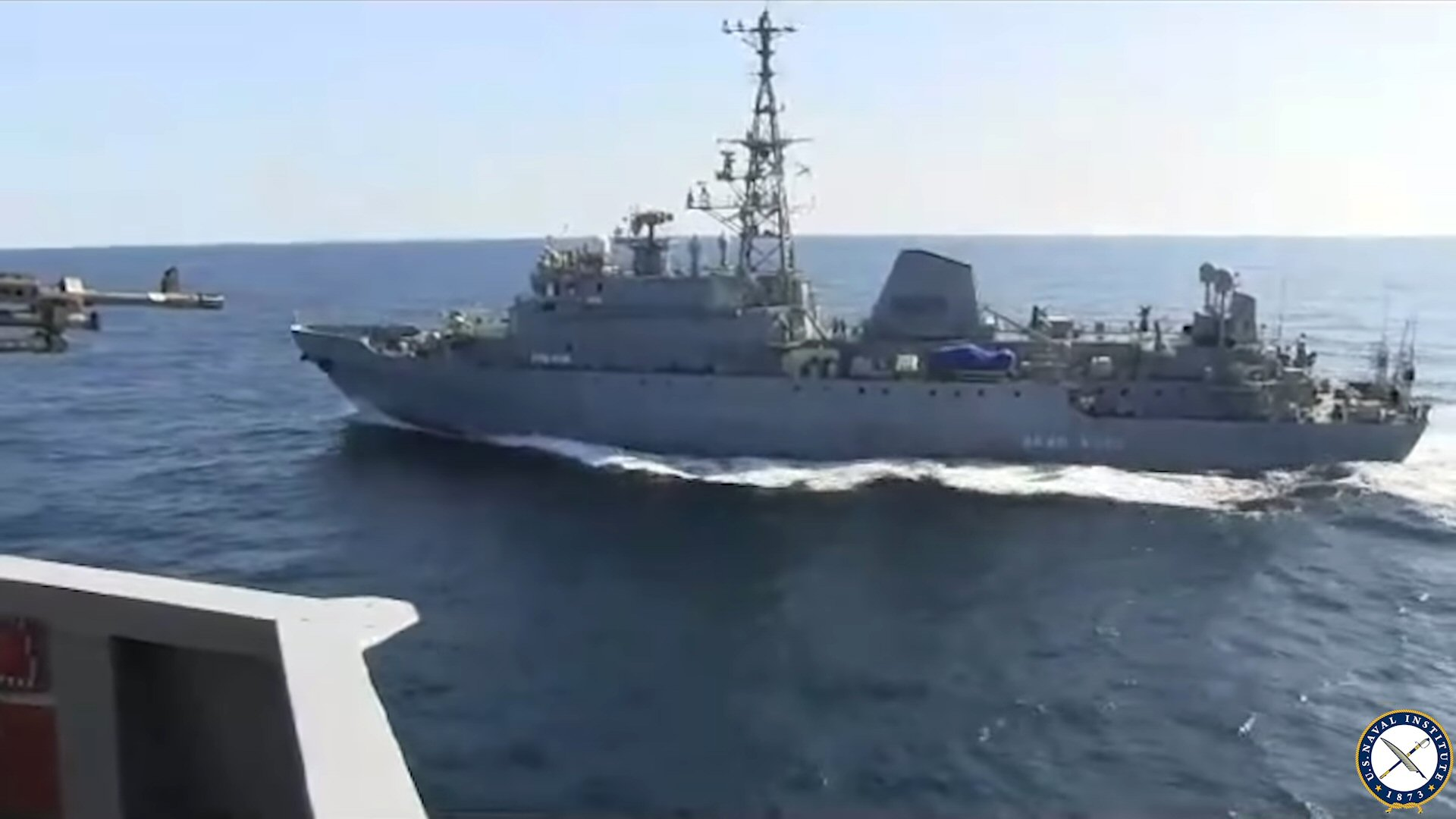
Ivan Khurs in 2020, as seen from USS Farragut

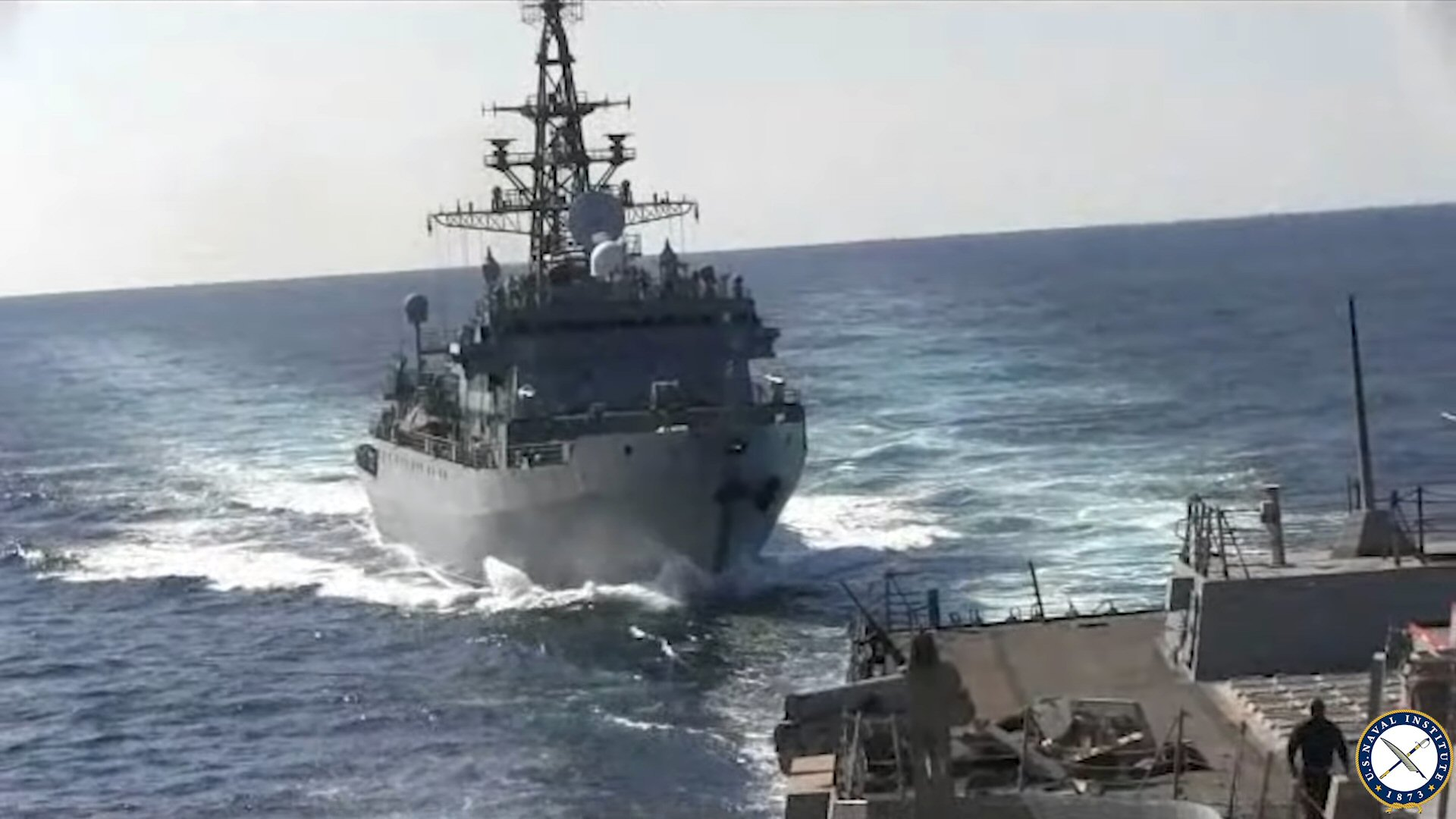
Ivan Khurs in 2020, as seen from USS Farragut

== See also ==
- List of ships of the Russian Navy
- List of ships of Russia by project number
