= Type 636 hydrographic survey ship =

Chinese class of naval diving support vessel

History

PRC
- Status: Active

General characteristics
- Class & type: Yanlai class
- Type: Hydrographic survey ship
- Propulsion: Marine Diesel
- Sensors & processing systems: Navigation radar
- Electronic warfare & decoys: None
- Armament: None
- Armour: None
- Aircraft carried: None
- Aviation facilities: None

The Type 636 and its successor Type 636A hydrographic survey ships is type of Chinese survey and research vessel designed to replace earlier Type 625 and Type 635 research vessels, and is currently in service with the People's Liberation Army Navy and Chinese Coast Guard. Type 636 & 636A has received NATO reporting name Shupang class.

== Type 636 ==
Type 636 hydrographic survey ship and its successor Type 636A are both designed by of the 708th Institute of China State Shipbuilding Corporation (CSSC), which is also more commonly known as China Shipbuilding and Oceanic Engineering Design Academy (中国船舶及海洋工程设计研究) nowadays. Special attention was given to vibration reduction measures and the internal noise generated by the ship itself was much lower than other ships of similar size. The ship was built by Wuhu Shipyard and entered service in August 1998. On November 16, 2011, it was transferred to Chinese Coast Guard. Specification:

- Length (m): 129.82
- Beam (m): 17
- Depth (m): 8.1
- Cruise speed (kn): 15
- Top speed (kn): 18
- Endurance (day): 60
- Range (nmi): 15000
- Displacement (t): 5872
- Max wind scale resistance: 12

== Type 636A ==
Type 636A is the successor of earlier Type 636. Construction of the first ship of Type 636A began at Wuhu Shipyard in May 2003 and there are more than two dozen surveying systems installed on board. Each ship has two names, one used with the pennant number when on naval service, and another when working in civilian roles. The former are the names of eminent scientists and the second in a Hai Yang (海洋, "ocean") numbered series.

- Length (m): 129.28
- Beam (m): 17
- Depth (m): 8.1
- Cruise speed (kn): 15
- Top speed (kn): 17.5
- Endurance (day): 60
- Range (nmi): 15000 @ 15 kn
- Displacement (t): 5883
- Crew: 134

== Ships ==
Type 636 and 636A ships are named as contemporary Chinese scientists.

Type	Pennant number	Name	Builder	Laid down	Commissioned	Civilian Name	Status
636	871	Li Siguang	Wuhu Shipyard	―	October 1998	Hai Yang 18	Decommissioned (CCG: Haijing 2506)
636A	872	Zhu Kezhen	Wuhu Shipyard	—	May 2003	Hai Yang 20	Active
636A	875	Qian Sanqiang	Wuhu Shipyard	―	1 May 2008	Hai Yang 22	Active
636A	873	Qian Xuesen	Wuhu Shipyard	―	26 December 2015	Hai Yang 23	Active
636A	874	Deng Jiaxian	―	―	2 February 2016	Hai Yang 24	Active
636A	876	Qian Weichang	―	―	25 July 2016	Hai Yang 25	Active
636A	877	Chen Jingrun	―	―	After 2016	Hai Yang 26	Active
636A	878	Wang Ganchang	―	―	After 2016	Hai Yang 27	Active
636A	879	Zhu Guangya	―	―	After 2016	Hai Yang 28	Active
636A	880	Mao Yisheng	―	―	After 2016	Hai Yang 29	Active
