= Type 625 research vessel =

Chinese research ship

Type 625 oceanographic research ship is a series of oceanographic research ship developed by China for its People's Liberation Army Navy (PLAN). The series consisted of three models, A, B & C, but A & B are usually grouped together as one because C model differs from Models A & B on much greater scale. Originally designed to replace earlier Type 614, Type 625 has been replaced by its follow-on Type 636, and has since either retired from active service of PLAN and transferred to civilian agencies.

== Type 625A/B ==
Type 625A/B is the first member of the Type 625 series. Requirement of Type 625 was issued in the late 1970s, and a total of four units were planned. Construction of the first unit begun in the early 1970s, and others followed. Based on the experience of deployment, the fourth unit has some improvement, and the difference is large enough to have a different designation as Type 625B. Subsequently, the original Type 25 was re-designated as Type 625A, and the term Type 625 is used to denote all models in the series. These ships are named from Ocean (Haiyang, 海洋) 1 through Ocean 4 respectively.

The main difference between the fourth unit and the first three is that the fourth unit is larger and able to operate for longer period of time in extended missions. The fuel tank is increased in size, and sea water distillation and oil and water processing systems were upgraded. A bow thruster and new radars were added. Ocean 4 carries many western scientific research instruments such as that manufactured by US companies including Raytheon, and this was one of the first deals for these US companies to have successfully marketed their products in China. Specification:

- Length (m): 104.27
- Length between perpendiculars (m): 58
- Depth (m): 7.8
- Beam (m): 13.74
- Height (m): 27.5
- Displacement (t): 2608
- Main propulsion: two B&W 6K45GFdiesel engine @ 3533 kW each
- Cruise speed (kn): 15

Type	Pennant #	Builder	Laid down	Launched	Commissioned	Status	Fleet
625A	Ocean 1	Hudong-Zhonghua Shipyard	Apr 1, 1971	Feb 2, 1972	Nov 30, 1972	Retired/transferred to civilian agencies	PLAN & civilian agencies
625A	Ocean 2	Hudong-Zhonghua Shipyard	―	―	―	Retired/transferred to civilian agencies	PLAN & civilian agencies
625A	Ocean 4	Hudong-Zhonghua Shipyard	―	―	―	Retired/transferred to civilian agencies	PLAN & civilian agencies
625B	Ocean 4	Hudong-Zhonghua Shipyard	―	―	Oct 1980	Retired/transferred to civilian agencies	PLAN & civilian agencies

== Type 625C ==
Type 625C is the second batch of Type 625 series and it is development of earlier Type 625A/B. The main difference is that Type 625C is larger, with displacement increased by more than a third to more than three thousand tons in comparison to the original Type 625A. The internal layout is also different between Type 625C and earlier Type 625A/B. For these reasons, this second batch received Type 625C designation. Type 625C program begun in March 1979 when Hudong-Zhonghua Shipyard, the original builder of earlier Type 625A/B was once again selected to build the follow on ships. In June and July of the same year, supplementary contractual clauses were signed, and in January 1980, the design was approved. Construction of both ships begun at the same time in Sept 1980, instead of sequentially as in earlier Type 625A/B series. Contrary to earlier Type 625A/B series which are operated by a mixed crew of civilian and naval personnel because those ships are jointly owned by PLAN and civilian establishments, the first two ships are manned by PLAN crew because both ships are owned by PLAN.

The method of deployment of the third and fourth ships of Type 625C, respectively named as Science (Kexue, 科学) 1 and Practice (Shiian, 实践) 3, reverted to the way it was done for earlier Type 625A/B series in that these ships are manned by a mixed crew of civilian and naval crew because these ships are jointly owned by PLAN and civilian governmental agencies. Build by the same shipyard, Science 1 cost ¥ 16.88 million and has a different internal layout than earlier two units, with a total ten labs on board. Construction of Science 1 actually begun before the two naval units, and the ship was also launched before the two naval units. However, because many new equipment was incorporated, most of which was for the very first time, sea trials took much longer and the ship entered service after the two naval units and hence considered the third ship of Type 625C. Experienced from Science 1 helped the fourth unit, Practice 3, which had more advanced scientific instruments. In addition to equipment on board, Practice 3also differs from previous three units in that it has a total of fourteen labs on board. Specification:

- Length (m): 104
- Draft (m): 4.9
- Displacement (t): 3324
- Main propulsion: two diesel engine @ 5280 hp each
- Cruise speed (kn): 15
- Max speed (kn): 19
- Range (nmi): 8000
- Accommodation: 38 crew + 63 scientists

Type	Pennant #	Builder	Laid down	Launched	Commissioned	Status	Fleet
625C	Ocean 11	Hudong-Zhonghua Shipyard	Sept 1980	Jun, 1981	Nov 24, 1981	Retired/transferred to civilian agencies	PLAN & civilian agencies
625C	Ocean 12	Hudong-Zhonghua Shipyard	Sept 1980	Jul, 1981	Nov 24, 1981	Retired/transferred to civilian agencies	PLAN & civilian agencies
625C	Science 1	Hudong-Zhonghua Shipyard	Dec 4, 1979	Jan 19, 1981	―	Retired/transferred to civilian agencies	PLAN & civilian agencies
625C	Practice 3	Hudong-Zhonghua Shipyard	―	―	―	Retired/transferred to civilian agencies	PLAN & civilian agencies
