= JS Hibiki =

Hibiki-class ocean surveillance ship

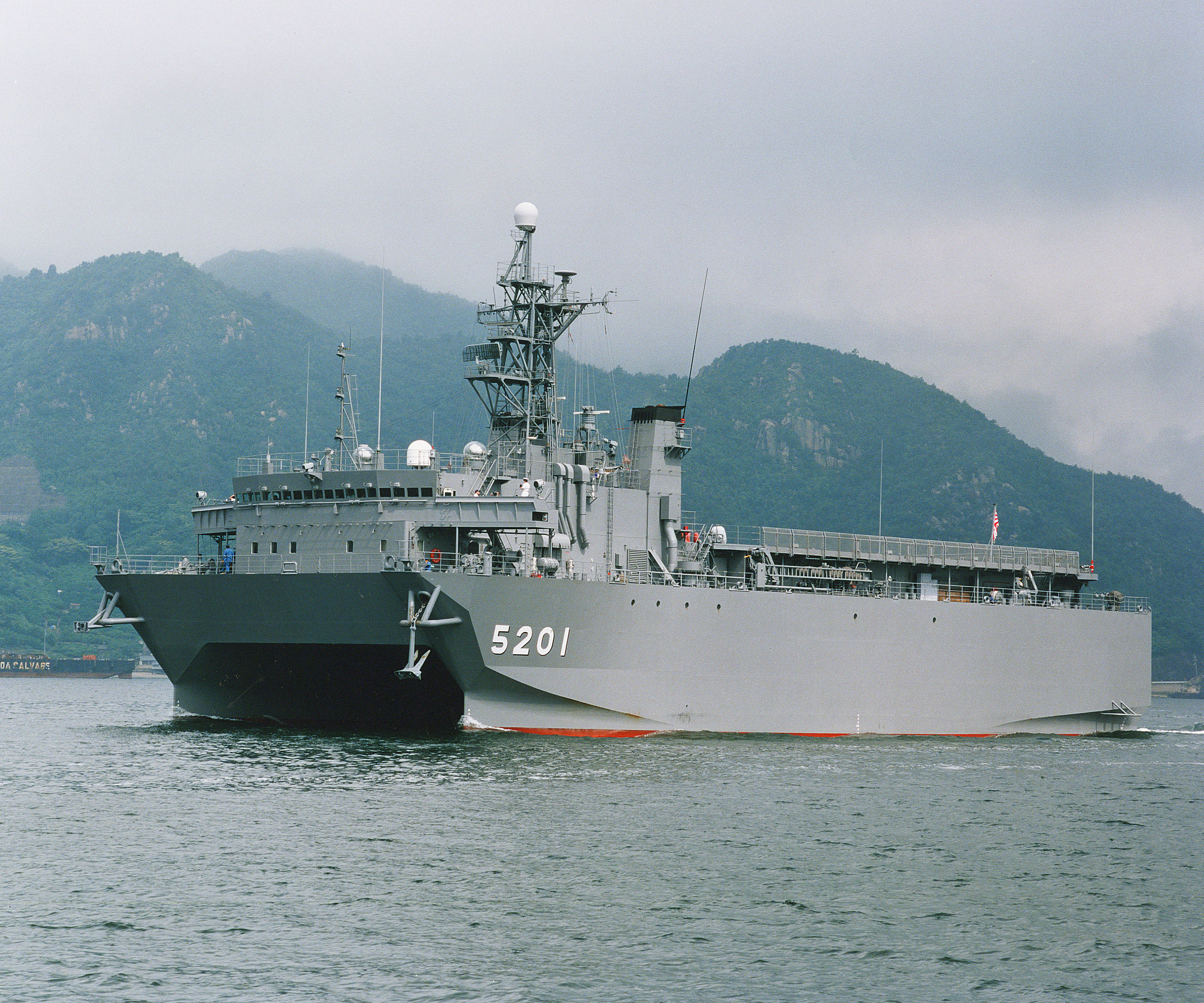
- JS Hibiki

History

Japan
- Name: Hibiki; (ひびき)
- Namesake: Hibiki
- Ordered: 1989
- Builder: Mitsui, Tamano
- Laid down: 28 November 1989
- Launched: 27 July 1990
- Commissioned: 30 January 1991
- Home port: Kure
- Identification: MMSI number: 431999584; Hull number: AOS-5201
- Status: Active

General characteristics
- Class & type: Hibiki-class ocean surveillance ship
- Displacement: 2,850–3,800 long tons (2,896–3,861 t) full load
- Length: 67.0 m (219 ft 10 in)
- Beam: 29.9 m (98 ft 1 in)
- Draft: 7.5 m (24 ft 7 in)
- Propulsion: 4 × Mitsubishi S6U-MPTK diesel engines; 2 x shafts
- Speed: 11 knots (20 km/h; 13 mph)
- Complement: 40
- Sensors & processing systems: OPS-16; OPS-9; Sonar AN / UQQ-2
- Aviation facilities: Helipad

JS Hibiki (AOS-5201) is a Hibiki-class ocean surveillance ship of Japan Maritime Self-Defense Force (JMSDF).

== Development and design ==
Hibiki-class vessels have a beam of 30 metres (98 ft 5 in), a top speed of 11 knots (20 km/h; 13 mph), and a standard range of 3,800 nautical miles (7,000 km; 4,400 mi). Each vessel has a crew of 40, including five American civilian technicians, and a flight deck for helicopters to operate off of. They are able to deploy on station for 90 days.

The vessels have an AN/UQQ-2 Surveillance Towed Array Sensor System (SURTASS), which was installed in the United States. Data from the sensors is relayed through the Defense Satellite Communications System and processed and shared with the United States. The data is fed into the Integrated Undersea Surveillance System.

Propulsion is provided by four Mitsubishi S6U-MPTK diesel electric engines.

== Construction and career ==
Hibiki was laid down on 28 November 1989 at Mitsui Engineering & Shipbuilding, Tamano and launched on 27 July 1990. She was commissioned on 30 January 1991. Currently, her homeport is in Kure.

After deployment, from 9 March 1991, she was circulated to Oakland, California, United States, for proficiency training after service, and, after learning the SURTASS system, she was equipped with a sonar array in Pearl Harbor, Hawaii. After the equipment certification test was completed, she returned to Japan on 17 October 1991.

Full-scale operation started in April 1992, and the actual operation was where the anti-submarine information analysis center on land began.

On 1 December 2015, the Oceanographic Command Group was reorganized into the Oceanographic Command and Anti-submarine Support Group and was incorporated into the 1st Acoustic Measurement Corps, which was newly formed under the same group.

On 1 November 2017, a crew system was introduced to the 1st Acoustic Measurement Corps for the first time as a JMSDF ship, and, from now on, the crew will not be fixed, as three crews will operate two ships alternately.
