= JS Aki =

Hibiki-class ocean surveillance ship

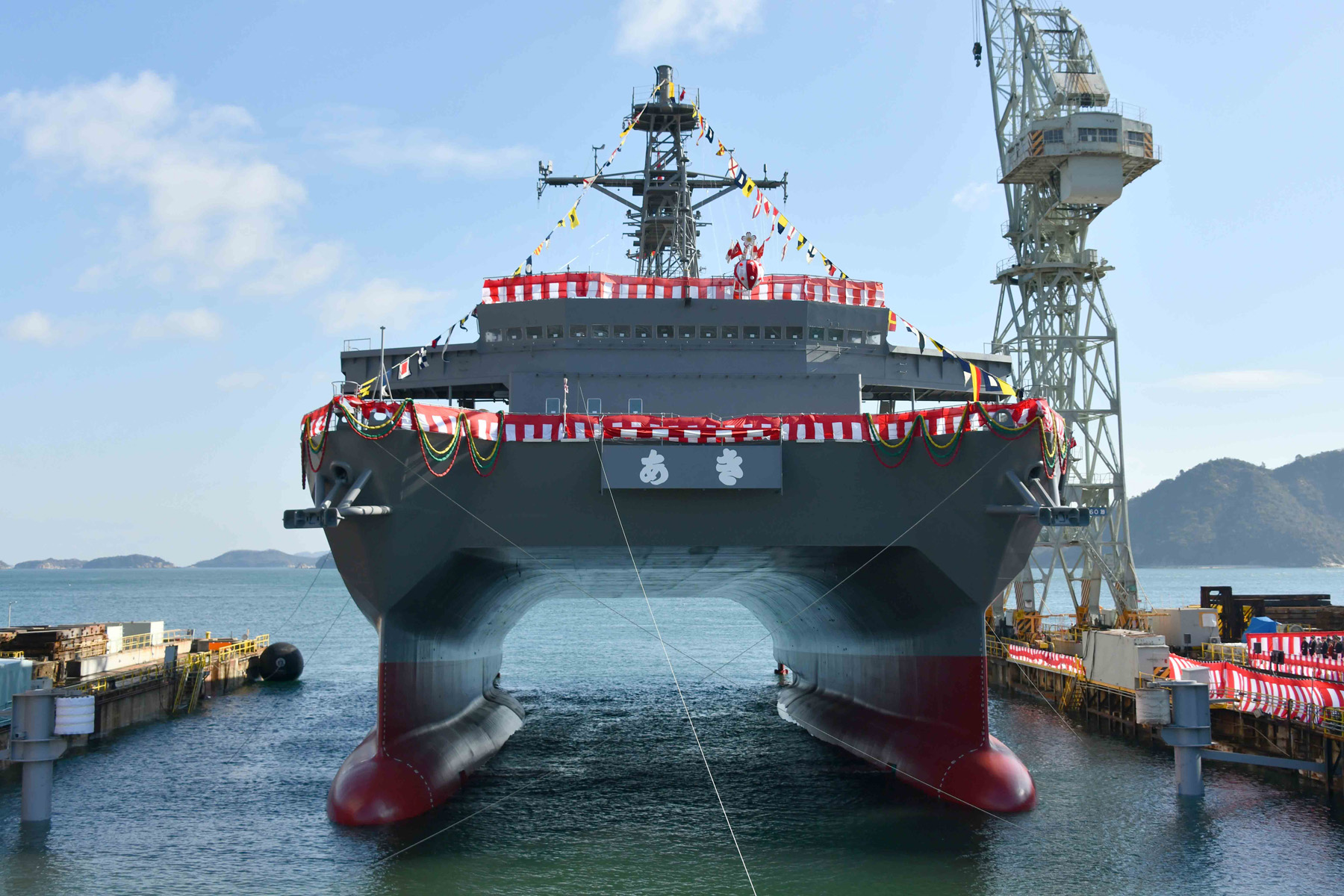
- JS Aki being launched on 17 January 2020

History

Japan
- Name: Aki; (あき)
- Namesake: Aki
- Ordered: 1 February 2018
- Builder: Mitsui, Tamano
- Laid down: October 2018
- Launched: 15 January 2020
- Commissioned: 4 March 2021
- Identification: Hull number: AOS-5203
- Status: Commissioned

General characteristics
- Class & type: Hibiki-class ocean surveillance ship
- Displacement: 2,850–3,800 long tons (2,896–3,861 t) full load
- Length: 67.0 m (219 ft 10 in)
- Beam: 29.9 m (98 ft 1 in)
- Draft: 7.5 m (24 ft 7 in)
- Propulsion: 4 × MTU 8V 4000 M33S diesel engines; 2 × shafts
- Speed: 11 knots (20 km/h; 13 mph)
- Complement: 40
- Sensors & processing systems: OPS-16; OPS-9; Sonar AN / UQQ-2
- Aviation facilities: Helipad

JS Aki (AOS-5203) is a Hibiki-class ocean surveillance ship of Japan Maritime Self-Defense Force (JMSDF).

== Development and design ==
Hibiki-class vessels have a beam of 30 metres (98 ft 5 in), a top speed of 11 knots (20 km/h; 13 mph), and a standard range of 3,800 nautical miles (7,000 km; 4,400 mi). Each vessel has a crew of 40, including five American civilian technicians, and a flight deck for helicopters to operate off of. They are able to deploy on station for 90 days.

The vessels have an AN/UQQ-2 Surveillance Towed Array Sensor System (SURTASS), which was installed in the United States. Data from the sensors is relayed through the Defense Satellite Communications System and processed and shared with the United States. The data is fed into the Integrated Undersea Surveillance System.

Propulsion is provided by four Mitsubishi S6U-MPTK diesel electric engines.

== Construction and career ==
Aki was laid down in October 2018 at Mitsui Engineering & Shipbuilding, Tamano and launched on 15 January 2020. She was commissioned on 4 March 2021.
