= Spy ship =

Ship intended to gather intelligence

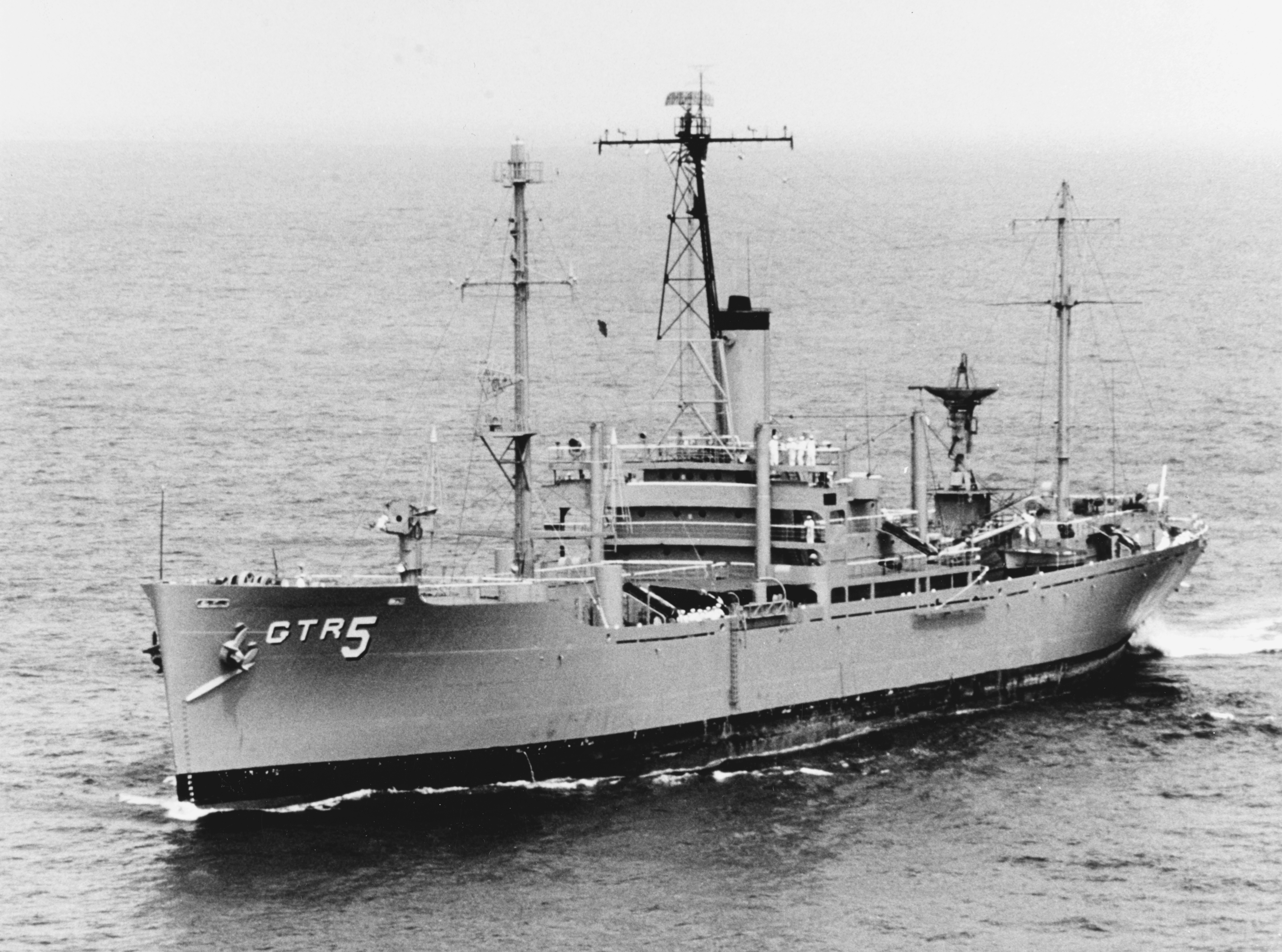
USS Liberty, a "technical research ship", in 1967

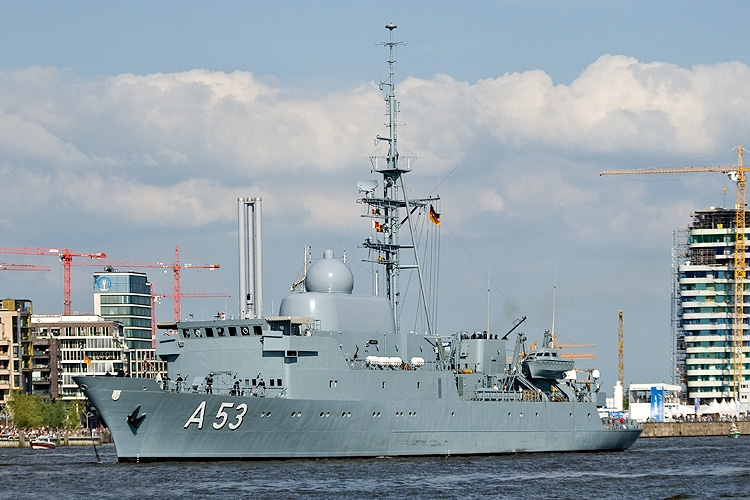
Oker, an Oste-class ELINT and reconnaissance ship, of the German Navy

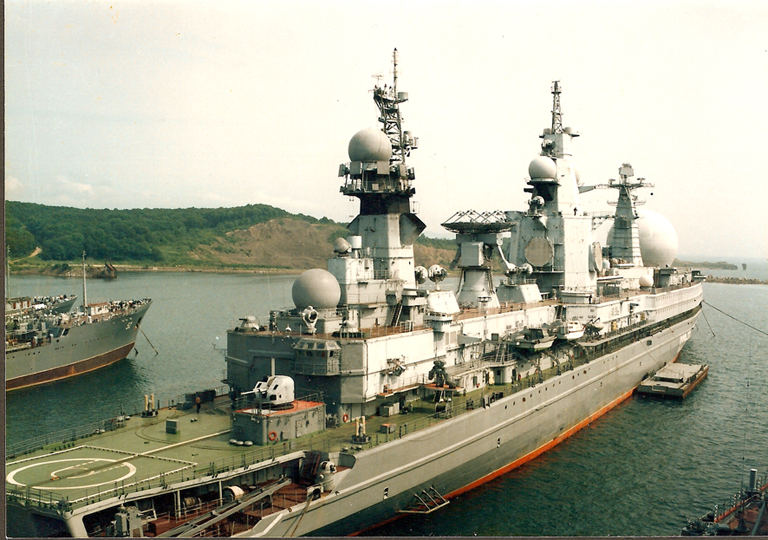
SSV-33 Ural, the largest spy ship ever constructed, used by the USSR to observe and track US ballistic and orbital launches.

A spy ship or reconnaissance vessel is a dedicated ship intended to gather intelligence, usually by means of sophisticated electronic eavesdropping. In a wider sense, any ship intended to gather information could be considered a spy ship.

Spy ships are usually controlled by a nation's government, due to the high costs and advanced equipment required. They tend to be parts of the nation's navy, though they may also be operated by secret services.

Naval trawlers masquerade as civilian ships such as fishing trawlers, which could be reasonably expected to remain in a certain area for a long time.

Ships which are used to infiltrate spies or special forces are sometimes also called "spy ships".

== History ==
An early version of what would become known as a spy ship is the United States civilian cargo ship USS Gold Star (AK-12), which made frequent voyages to Japan, China and the Philippines with cargo and passengers during the 1920s and 1930s. Starting in 1933 as a station ship she was assigned to monitor internal Japanese Fleet frequencies and direction finder azimuths. She had three intercept operators and one chief radioman supervised by an officer. Gold Star and ground stations provided significant intelligence before the Japanese attack on Pearl Harbor on 7 December 1941.

Spy ships in the modern sense of being specially built and entirely dedicated to intelligence tasks came into being during the early Cold War, and they are in use by all major powers. Their uses, in addition to listening in on communications and spy on enemy fleet movements, were to monitor nuclear tests and missile launches (especially of potential ICBMs). One of the most important functions for both Cold War spy ship fleets, especially in the 1960s, was the gathering of submarine "signatures" – the patterns of noise that could often identify the specific type of submarine and were thus valuable in anti-submarine warfare. During that era, the United States fielded about 80 vessels, usually classified as "environmental research" craft, while the Soviet Union had around 60 ships, often converted trawlers or hydrographic research ships.

In the late 1980s, the Soviet fisheries fleet was known for having equipped many of their thousands of ships with sophisticated SIGINT and ELINT equipment, thus functioning as auxiliary spy ships tracking western naval vessels and electronic communications (though their main function remained commercial fishing).

== Operation ==
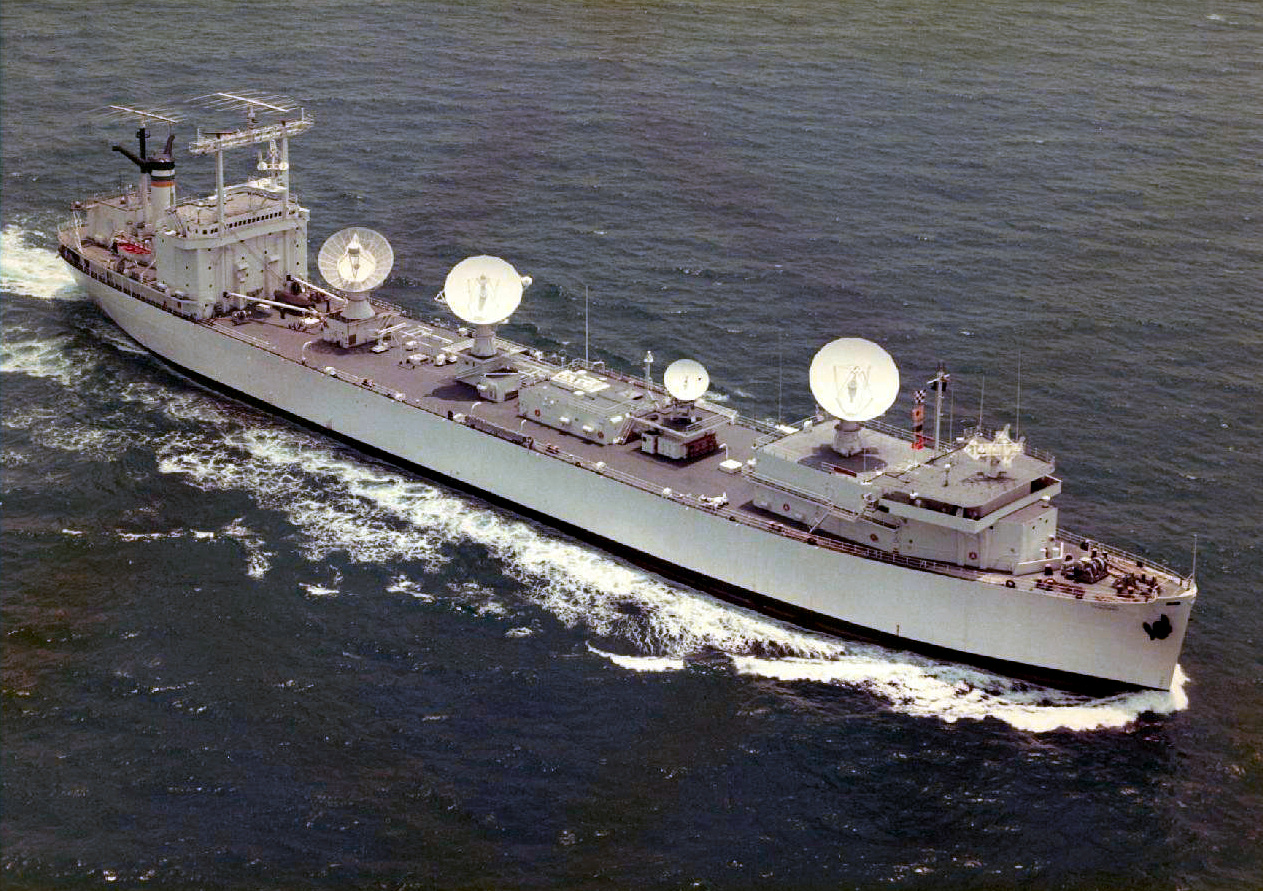
While USNS Vanguard was not strictly a spy ship, being used for space tracking, there is some overlap between her capabilities and those of a spy ship.

A spy ship usually stays in international waters (or at least outside territorial waters), so as to not violate territorial borders. From there, it will use its electronic equipment to monitor sea and air traffic, radio and radar frequencies and also try to intercept and decrypt coded radio or phone communications. This is mostly done via passive means such as radio receivers or passive sonar. Sometimes however, active measures such as radar or sonar may also be used to detect the movement of aircraft, missiles, ships or other vehicles or troops. However, this risks revealing the ship's purpose.

As it is located much closer to the surveilled area than a fixed installation (given a close by shoreline), the monitoring is usually much more efficient and in some respects better than even that of spy satellites.

Tracking vessels also have some of the capabilities of spy ships, and as they are controlled by their national governments, they are also intermittently used for similar purposes, such as tracking enemy missile tests.

== Soviet AGI trawlers ==
As the United States Navy began deploying ballistic missile submarines in 1960, the Soviet Union attempted to obtain more information about the capabilities of the UGM-27 Polaris missile and the locations of the submarines capable of launching them. While the Soviet Navy requested more sophisticated ships, they were allocated trawlers (called tra-ou-lery) from the fishing fleet equipped with more sophisticated sensors and communication equipment. Very capable crews were assigned to these trawlers of unremarkable appearance. They were assigned to patrol stations off United States naval bases to photograph and report arrival and departure of United States warships and auxiliaries. Other trawlers of similar appearance would patrol weapons firing ranges used by the United States Navy to observe practice firings of modern weapons and record the acoustic and/or electromagnetic signature of the sonar, search radar, fire-control radar, guidance, and/or command electronics of each weapons system. The United States Navy officially designated these trawlers as Auxiliary, General Intelligence (AGI), and they were informally known as "tattletales".

An AGI might be assigned to a single patrol station for as long as six months. These ships were not fast enough to keep up with most warships, but they sometimes congregated around aircraft carriers conducting air operations of the United States Sixth Fleet in the Mediterranean or United States Seventh Fleet in the western Pacific Ocean, or in suspected patrol areas of ballistic missile submarines. After the Cuban Missile Crisis, the Joint Chiefs of Staff authorized a "counter AGI program"~ for United States destroyers to come alongside the AGIs to push against them, foul their screws with steel nets, and focus high power electromagnetic transmitters to burn out the amplifying circuitry of their electronic sensors. The AGI crews then revealed their ship-handling skills using superior maneuverability to evade the destroyers' intentions. This jousting in international waters continued until signing of the U.S.–Soviet Incidents at Sea agreement in 1972.

In 1972, as the U.S. and U.K. partners started operating radar station Cobra Mist, it garnered attention from many Soviet spy trawlers. A year later, the radar station was shut down due to interference. The source of the interference was never confirmed and some theories still hold Soviet countermeasures responsible.

== List of active spy ships ==
- Chinese Navy
  - Type 813 spy ship
  - Type 814A spy ship
  - Type 815 spy ship
  - Yuan Wang-class tracking ship
- French Navy
  - Dupuy de Lôme
- German Navy
  - Oste-class fleet service ship
- Indian Navy
  - INS Anvesh
  - INS Dhruv
- Islamic Republic of Iran Navy
  - IRIS Zagros
- Italian Navy
  - Elettra
- Royal Norwegian Navy
  - Marjata (1992)
  - Marjata (2014)
- Japanese Navy
  - JS Hibiki
  - JS Harima
  - JS Aki
  - JS Bingo
- Pakistan Navy
  - PNS Rizwan
- Polish Navy
  - ORP Nawigator
  - ORP Hydrograf
  - ORP Henryk Zygalski
  - ORP Jerzy Różycki
  - ORP
- Russian Navy
  - See also: List of active Russian Navy ships#Special-purpose ships
  - Primor'ye-class surveillance ship
  - Balzam-class intelligence ship
  - Yury Ivanov-class intelligence ship
  - Vishnya-class intelligence ship
  - Yantar
- Spanish Navy
  - Spanish intelligence ship Alerta
- Swedish Navy
  - HSwMS Artemis
  - HSwMS Orion
  - HSwMS Carlskrona
- Turkish Navy
  - TCG Ufuk
- Ukrainian Navy
  - A512 Pereyaslav
- United States Navy
  - USS Pueblo

== See also ==
- Technical research ship (a class of US spy ships of the early Cold War)
- USS Liberty incident
- Battle of Amami-Ōshima
