= Esther Ortega Arjonilla =

Researcher, historian, university professor and activist

Esther Mayoko Ortega Arjonilla
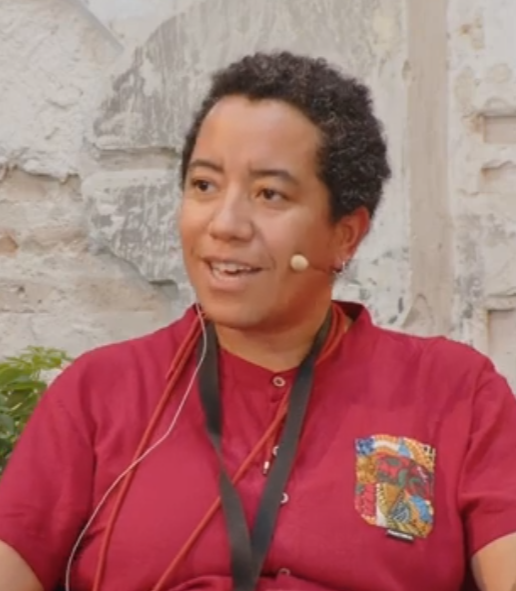
- In an MC video in 2022
- Born: Móstoles, Spain
- Occupations: Historian, Professor, and Activist

Academic background
- Education: Complutense University of Madrid; University of Santiago de Compostela
- Thesis: The question of sex/gender in medicine: Sex reassignment technologies and gender values in Spain (2014)
- Doctoral advisor: Eulalia Pérez Sedeño and Concepción Martínez Vidal

Academic work
- Discipline: Gender studies
- Institutions: Spanish National Research Council

Esther Mayoko Ortega Arjonilla (Móstoles, 20th century) is a Spanish historian, doctor of philosophy in the philosophy of science, and a university professor of Ndowé origin. She is also an antiracist and lesbian feminist activist. Her research centers on themes of sexual diversity, racism, and feminism.

== Biography ==
Esther Ortega earned her doctorate in the philosophy of science at the University of Santiago de Compostela. She earned her Master's degree in Feminist theory and is licensed in history, specializing in American anthropology and the History of the Americas, from Complutense University of Madrid. In her doctoral thesis, she focused on "the biomedical regulation of sexed bodies, gender practices and the socio-medical controversies associated with these regulations in the cases of trans identities in the Spanish state."

Ortega has focused her research career on the studies of science, technology, and society, gender, race and ethnicity, queer-feminist theory and its intersections. She is a postgraduate professor of Science, Technology, and Society at the Spanish National Research Council at the Complutense University of Madrid and in the Spanish Tufts-Skidmore program. In addition, Ortega has been a lecturer and professor of different courses and lectures that address questions of race, sex, and sexuality, and she has written for Pikara Magazine.

Ortega has been a part of antiracist, feminist, and sexual diversity movements. In the 1990s, she was one of the cofounders of the university feminist collective "Insumisas al Género" (transl. Unruly to Gender), and carried out her feminist activism on the Eskalera Karakola in Madrid, until her eviction in 2004. Ortega also belongs to the association formerly known as "Espacio Afroconciencia" (transl. Afroconscious Space), linked to Matadero Madrid, along with Yeison García and Rubén H. Bermúdez, where she exercises her political activism. In addition, she is part of the feminist group "Red.Afrofem."

In 2003, Ortega began working on studies of gender and medical technologies from the perspective of gender studies and with many different national research projects, such as ITEMS, BIOGENTEC, and VIVERTEC. With these, she has worked on the research and development under the Spanish National Research Council's leading science, technology, and gender research with the philosopher Eulalia Pérez Sedeño, titled "Voces múltiples, saberes plurales y tecnologías médicas" (transl. Multiple voices, plural knowledge and medical technologies).

In 2023, Ortega participated in E. L. Queer. Primer Encuentro de Literatura Queer, which she celebrated in the Museo Nacional Centro de Arte Reina Sofía in Madrid.

== Publications ==
She has published many articles and collaborated on several books: El eje del mal es heterosexual: Figuraciones, movimientos y prácticas feministas queer (transl. The axis of evil is heterosexual: Figurations, movements and queer feminist practices) (Traficantes de Sueños, 2005), Cartografías del cuerpo. Biopolíticas de la ciencia y la tecnología (transl. Cartographies of the body: Biopolitics of Science and Technology) (Cátedra, 2014), Barbarismos queer y otras esdrújulas (transl. Queer barbarisms and other proparoxytones) (Bellaterra, 2017), with co-authors Lucas Platero and María Rosón, Conocimientos, prácticas y activismo de las epistemologías feministas (transl. Knowledge, practices and activism of feminist epistemologies) (2019). In her academic work, she has collaborated to publish articles or been coauthor of books with researchers such as Lucas Platero, Dau García Dauder, and others.

== See also ==
- Julia Serano
- Jaya Sharma
