= University of Santiago de Compostela =

University in Spain

- Universidade de Santiago de Compostela
- Motto: Latin: Sigillum Regiae Universitatis Compostellanae
- Type: Public
- Established: 1495; 531 years ago
- Academic affiliations: Leading member and founder of Compostela Group of Universities
- Budget: €228 million (2011)
- Rector: Prof. Dr. Rosa Crujeiras
- Undergraduates: 23,835
- Postgraduates: 1,716
- Doctoral students: 2,697
- Location: Santiago de Compostela, Galicia, Spain; 42.88852250°N 8.54497260°W
- Campus: Santiago de Compostela and Lugo (both urban)
- Faculty: 2,149
- Website: www.usc.gal/en

The University of Santiago de Compostela - USC (Galician: Universidade de Santiago de Compostela - USC, Spanish: Universidad de Santiago de Compostela - USC) is a public university located in the city of Santiago de Compostela, Galicia, Spain. A second campus is located in Lugo, Galicia. It is one of the world's oldest universities in continuous operation.

The university traces its roots back to 1495, when a school was opened in Santiago. In 1504, Pope Julius II approved the foundation of a university in Santiago but "the bull for its creation was not granted by Clement VII until 1526". In 1555 the institute began to separate itself from strictly religious instruction with the help of Cardinal Juan Álvarez de Toledo and started to work towards developing other academic fields, including the emerging science fields.

Today the university's facilities cover more than 130 hectares (320 acres). In terms of human resources, the university has more than 2,000 teachers involved in study and research, over 42,000 students, and more than 1,000 people working in administration and services. Moreover, in 2009, the university received the accreditation of Campus of International Excellence by the Ministry of Education, recognising USC as one of the most prestigious universities in Spain.

The university ranks 5th in Spain's best universities ranking by Complutense University of Madrid and IAIF and 4th amongst public universities.

== History ==
The roots of the university go back to 1495, when the Santiago de Compostela solicitor López Gómez de Mazoa founded, with the help of the abbot of San Martiño Pinario, a school for the poor known as "Grammatic Academy" in the monastery of San Paio de Antealtares. Early on, the success of the school was in doubt due to a lack of economic resources. But in the year 1504, Pope Julius II issued a papal bull recognizing the institution and allowing for the institution of higher learning in the "Gramatic Academy".

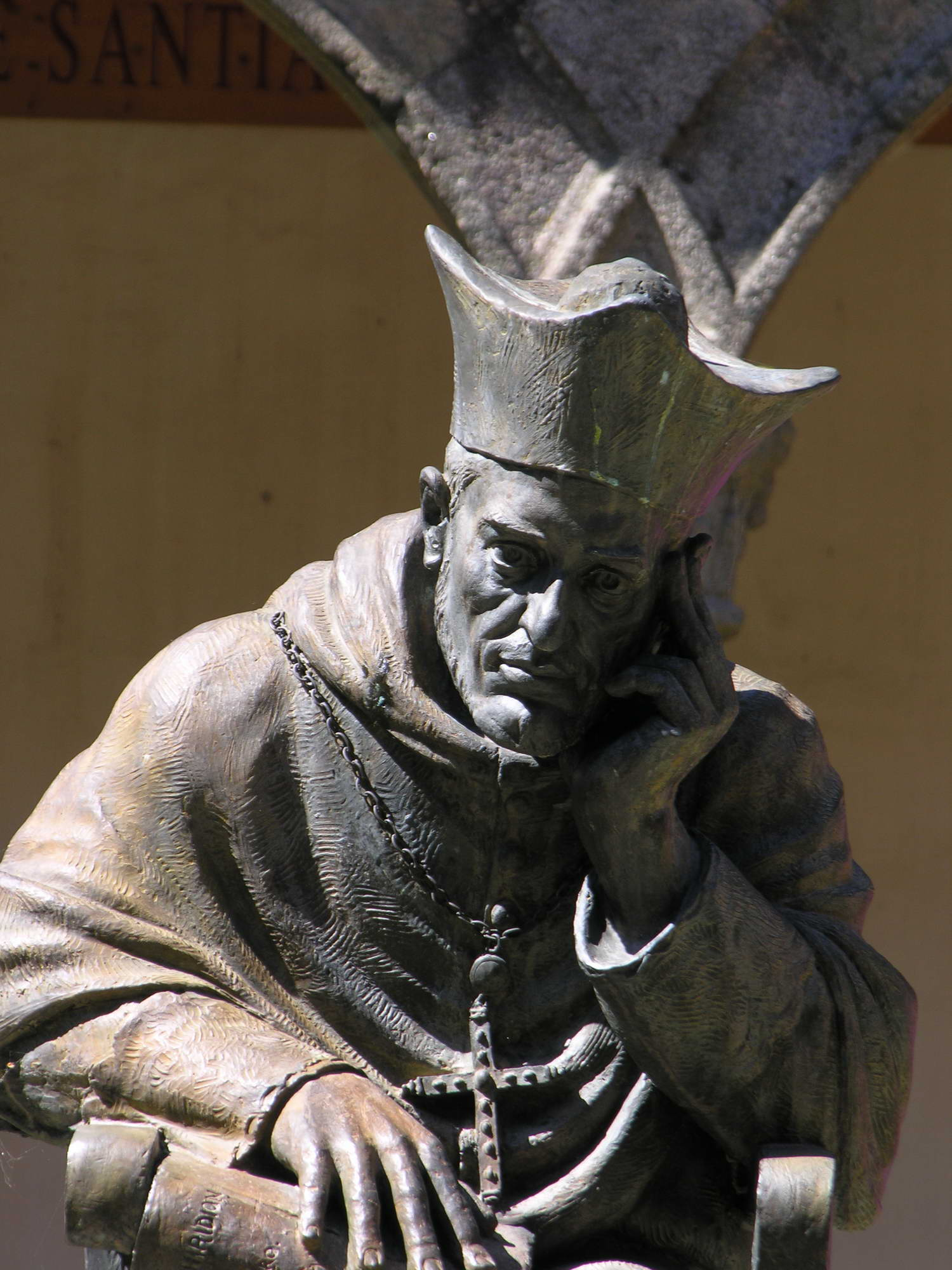
Alonso III de Fonseca

The definitive consolidation of the university comes with Alonso III de Fonseca, named archbishop of Santiago de Compostela in 1507. Fonseca was an extremely erudite man, a Renaissance man and patron of numerous artists of the time, who was in touch with important thinkers such as Erasmus of Rotterdam. At this time the old Pilgrim's Hospital was purchased with the aim of transforming it into a university college. The Santiago Alfeo College, today known as the Fonseca College, was also built, which became the centre of the university life until the second half of the 18th century and still remains emblematic in today's university. At the end of the 16th and beginning of the 17th centuries the San Patricio College, or College of the Irish, was created and the San Xerome College was moved to its current location.

In contrast to current practice, these colleges agglutinated all the seats of learning in the same building, where students lived as boarders. At this time, there were the main disciplines: Theology, Grammar and Arts, which were soon complemented with the study of Law (paying special attention to ecclesiastical law) and Medicine, more preoccupied with the health of the soul than about the care of the body.

The 18th century witnessed a profound transformation in the University of Santiago. Not only was it the era when the university escaped completely from the control of the religious orders of the Catholic Church, but it was also a time when the university lost part of its autonomy to the centralising forces of the Spanish monarchy. It was during this period that Charles III granted the title of "Regia" (in English, Royal) to the university. The university seal is enriched with the Royal Crown over the coat of arms of Castilla, León and Galicia, as well as the most important founders' emblems.

After expelling the Jesuits, Charles III granted their land and buildings in Santiago to the university, thus establishing the core of the new university. Immediately, the university recuperated to its plan of studies disciplines that had been previously given to certain religious congregations, including academic degrees and schools for Experimental Physics or Chemistry.

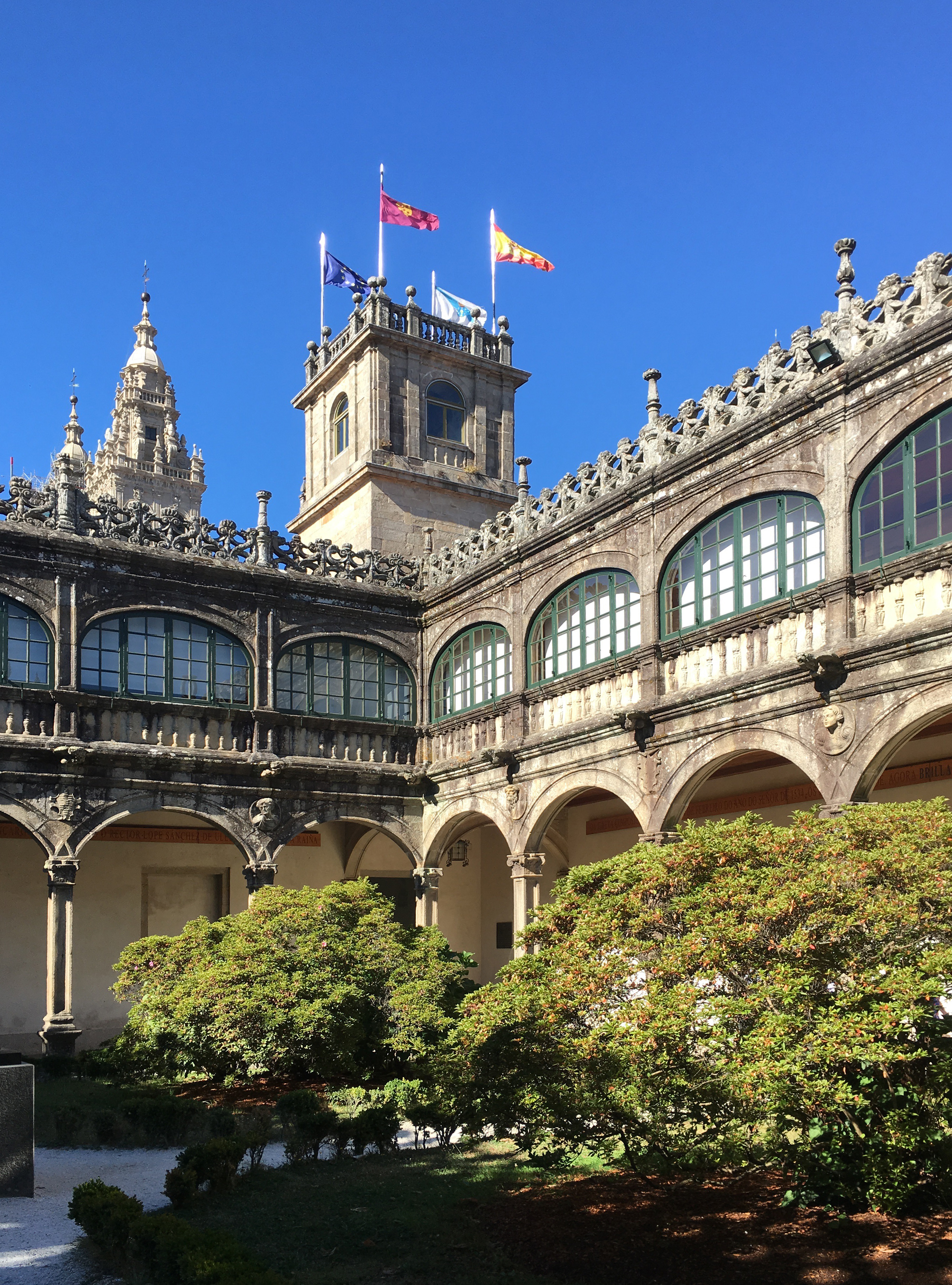
Interior of Fonseca College

At the beginning of the 20th century, a new generation of intellectuals closely associated with the university emerged and contributed to a revival of cultural life in Galicia. During this period, modern intellectual and scientific currents gained wider acceptance, bringing prominent scholars from various disciplines to the institution. University of Santiago de Compostela experienced substantial growth in student enrollment and academic programs, accompanied by the expansion of its infrastructure. New facilities included extensions to the main university building, the Faculty of Geography and History, student residences, the College of Veterinary Medicine (now the seat of the Parliament of Galicia), the College for the Deaf and Dumbs (now the seat of the Xunta de Galicia) and the Faculty and Medicine. Another notable development was the establishment of the university residence hall in 1930. The period was characterized by significant institutional growth and modernization, as well as efforts to adapt academic studies more closely to social and cultural context of Galicia.

Another characteristic of the 20th century was the establishment of agreements with foreign institutions of university education, at first with Portuguese universities. From then on, academic halls were established for women, who became members of the university in the 1913–1914 academic year. Moreover, the number of books of the institution has been increased with new endowments, such as that of the American Library.

The military rising against the Republic and the outbreak of the Spanish Civil War meant a period of change in the University of Santiago. The military coups dominated the city council, imposing on the university a new rector and new norms such as praying before and after each lesson. Precisely, the Santiago de Compostela anti-Franco opposition came from "middle class intellectuals" and students of the university and not from the working-class movements, as happened in Coruña, Vigo or Ferrol.

=== Recent history ===
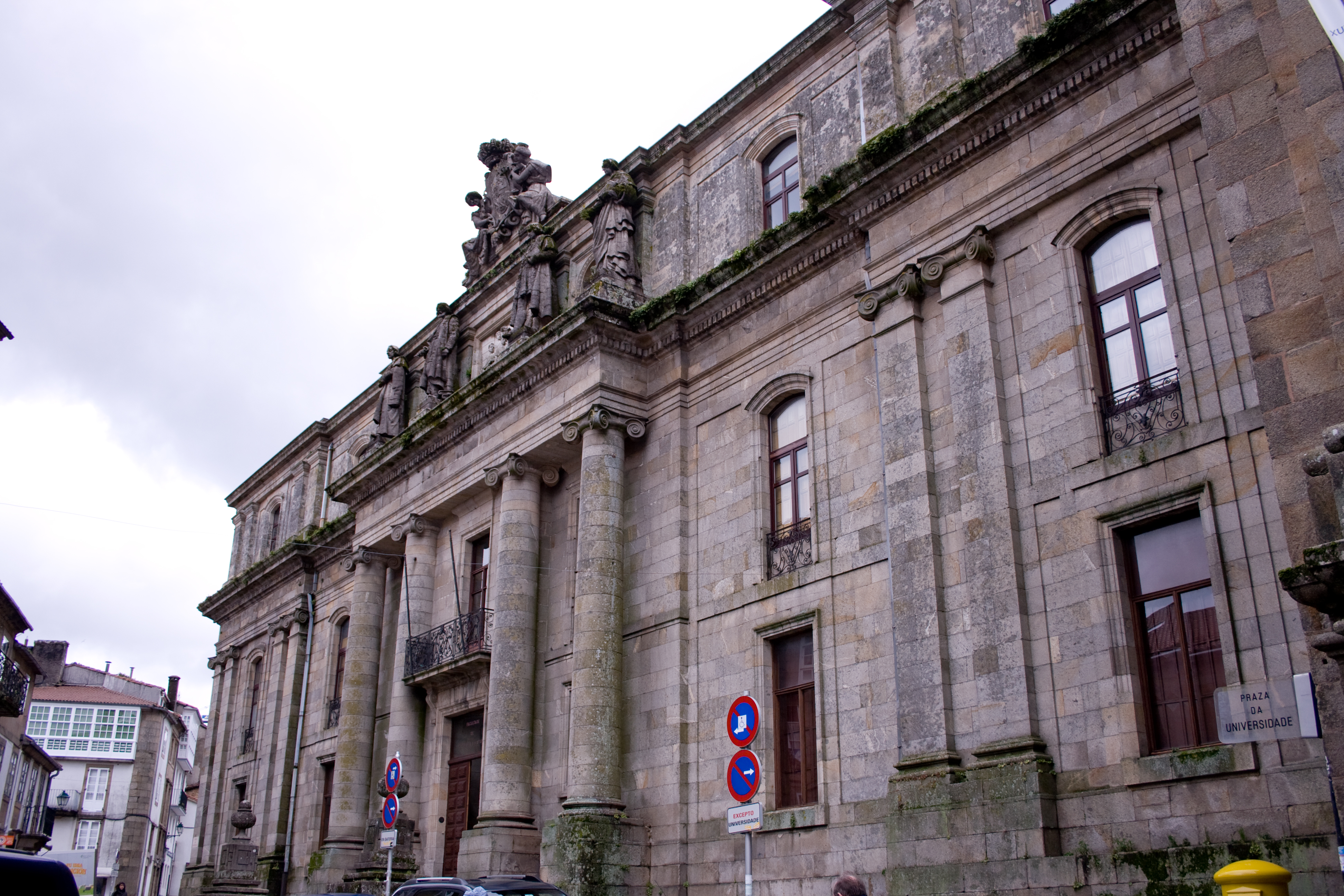
Old main building of the University, now the Faculty of Geography and History

The University of Santiago de Compostela was the first university in Galicia. In the 1980s, two additional university campuses in A Coruña and Vigo were established, fully dependent of the University of Santiago de Compostela. Later that decade the two became independent universities, able for the first time to issue their own official university degree titles. Prior to that, the only institution which shared "Official Degree Studies" in Galicia was the "School of Naval and Industrial Engineers" of Ferrol, which was created by a ministerial order under the initiative of General Francisco Franco in the early 1960s.

This school was directly dependent of the Ministry of Education in Madrid though in 1990 will be amalgamated to the University of A Coruña.

Following the introduction of the new Spanish Constitution of 1978 and the arrival of democracy, the new elected president of Spain, Felipe González Márquez leader of the Spanish Socialist Workers' Party (PSOE) introduced legislation to transform the previous centralised Spanish State, into an amalgamation of autonomous regions with different degrees of self-administration.

The north-western corner of the Iberian Peninsula gained the autonomous status and the Spanish language now is imposed over the indigenous Galician language, now official. Galicia now has three universities, each of them with campuses of their own:

University of Santiago de Compostela, University of A Coruña (with two campuses, one in A Coruña and the other in Ferrol), and University of Vigo (with three campuses, one in Vigo, and the other two in Ourense and Pontevedra). In the last decades, the universities of Coruña and Vigo already segregated, the USC student population numbers over 45,000.

The university celebrated its 500th anniversary in 1995.

== University life ==
University rankings

Global – Overall
- ARWU World: 501–600 (2024)
- QS World: =628 (2026)
- THE World: 601–800 (2024)
- USNWR Global: =531 (2023)

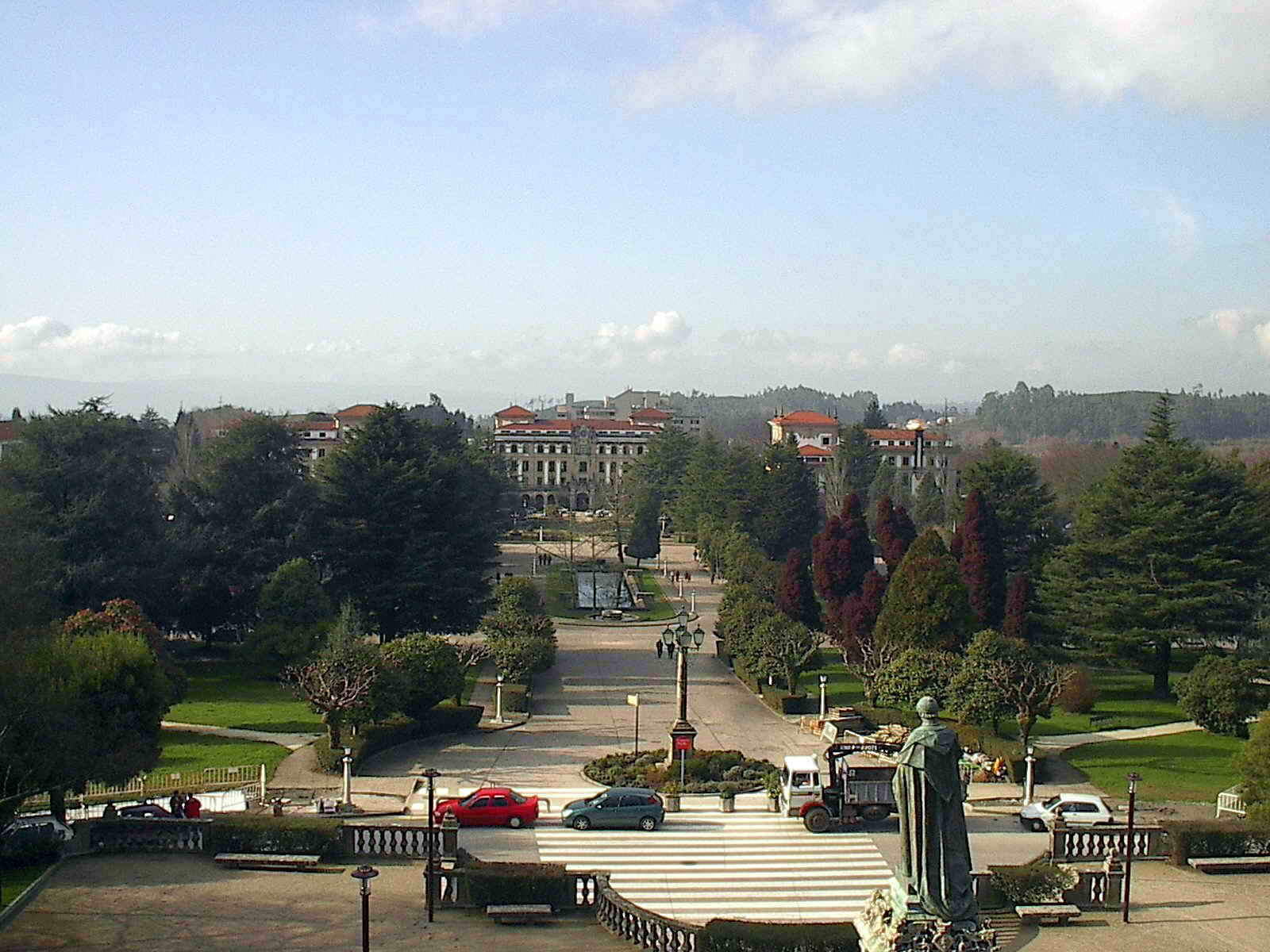
South campus

The university is organised into three campuses, North Campus and South Campus in Santiago and Lugo, which together include 30 centres, nearly 80 departments and more than 60 degrees, apart from numerous installations such as research institutes, halls of residence, sports and cultural facilities, and libraries.

=== Library: BUSC ===
The university's library, at the present (2012) has more than 1,000,000 volumes and several manuscripts of incalculable value. More recent data in the library website (busc.usc.es)

=== ConCiencia ===
In 2006, the university along with the Consortium of Santiago de Compostela established the Program ConCiencia. The program has organized visits to Santiago from the world's leading scientists. Since 2008 it has awarded the Fonseca Prize in science communication.

=== Memberships and partner institutions ===
The university is the partner of College of Law in Wroclaw.

== Academics ==
=== Faculties ===
The University of Santiago de Compostela offers a wide range of degrees in 19 faculties:

- Faculty of Biology
- Faculty of Chemistry
- Faculty of Communication Sciences
- Faculty of Economics and Business Administration
- Faculty of Education Sciences
- Faculty of Geography and History
- Faculty of Law
- Faculty of Mathematics
- Faculty of Medicine and Dentistry
- Faculty of Pharmacy
- Faculty of Philology
- Faculty of Philosophy
- Faculty of Physics
- Faculty of Political and Social Science
- Faculty of Psychology
- Faculty of Veterinary medicine
- Higher Technical Engineering School
- Higher Polytechnic School (at Lugo campus)
- University School of Labour Relations
- University School of Optics and Optometry
- University School of Nursing

=== Degrees ===
University of Santiago de Compostela offers degrees in the following fields:

- Health Sciences
- Physical Sciences
- Social Sciences
- Technical
- Humanities

=== Institutes ===
- Institute of Agricultural Biodiversity and Rural Development (2001), at Lugo

== Notable alumni and professors ==
The University of Santiago de Compostela produced a prime minister and many Spanish ministers, magistrates, mayors and all the presidents of the Xunta de Galicia.

=== Government ===
- Mariano Rajoy - Prime Minister of Spain (2011–2018) and President of the conservative People's Party (2004–2018)
- Francisco Vázquez Vázquez - Spain Ambassador to the Holy See (2006–2011) and Mayor of the city of A Coruña (1983–2006)
- Cándido Conde-Pumpido - Attorney General of Spain (2004–2011)
- Elena Espinosa - Spanish Minister of Agriculture and Fishing (2004–2010)
- Francisco Caamaño Domínguez - Spanish Minister of Justice (2001–2009)
- César Antonio Molina - Spanish Minister of Culture (2007–2009) and writer.
- José Manuel Romay Beccaría - Spanish Minister of Health (1996–2000)
- Abel Caballero - Spanish Minister of Public Works and Transport (1985–1988) and Mayor of the city of Vigo (2007–)
- Alberto Núñez Feijóo - President of Xunta de Galicia (2009–)
- Emilio Pérez Touriño - 4th President of Xunta de Galicia (2005–2009)
- Manuel Fraga - 3rd President of Xunta de Galicia (1990–2005) and founder of the conservative People's Party
- Fernando González Laxe - 2nd President of Xunta de Galicia (1987–1990)
- Gerardo Fernández Albor - 1st President of Xunta de Galicia (1982–1987)

=== Others ===
- Julio Abalde - rector of Universidade da Coruña
- Carmen Agulló Díaz (born 1957) - professor, non-fiction author
- María de los Ángeles Alvariño González - Leading Oceanographer and first female Scientist to work on British and Spanish exploration ships (1916–2005)
- Celia Brañas (1880–1948) - scientist and teacher fought for the education and inclusion of women into the scientific community in Spain
- Jimena Fernández de la Vega (1895–1984) - physician and researcher
- Aida Fernández Ríos - climate scientist and marine biologist
- Antonia Ferrín Moreiras - mathematician, professor, and the first Galician woman astronomer (1914–2009)
- José Daporta Gozález - Professor of Hygiene and Microbiology as well as a prolific fine arts collector (1911–1989)
- Alfonso Daniel Rodríguez Castelao - Writer, artist, politician and medical doctor (1886–1950)
- Xosé Luís Méndez Ferrín - Writer and philologist
- Oscar Horta - moral philosopher and animal rights activist
- Gonzalo Torrente Ballester - Writer and philosopher (1910–1999)
- Xosé Manuel Beiras - Professor of Economy, politician and writer
- María Inmaculada Paz-Andrade (1928–2022) - Director Department of Applied Physics
- Esther Ortega Arjonilla - historian and activist
- Ramon Otero Pedrayo - Professor of Geography, writer and politician (1888–1976)
- Ánxeles Penas (born 1943) - poet
- Ricardo Carvalho Calero - professor of Galician Language and Literature, writer (1910–1990)
- Fátima Rodríguez (b. 1961) - professor, writer, translator
- Darío Villanueva Prieto - professor of Spanish Literature, Director of the Real Academia Española
- Darysabel Isales - Puerto Rican opera singer and actress
- Bibiana Campos Seijo - Spanish editor, publisher, and media executive

== See also ==
- List of early modern universities in Europe
- List of oldest universities in continuous operation
- University of A Coruña
- University of Vigo
- San Clemente Dormitory
- Santiago de Compostela
- Academic Awards in Spain
- Fonseca Prize
