= María de los Ángeles Alvariño González =

Spanish biologist and oceanographer (1916–2005)

María de los Angeles Alvariño Gonzalez
- Born: October 3, 1916; Serantes, Galicia, Spain
- Died: May 29, 2005 (aged 88); La Jolla, California, U.S.
- Education: University of Santiago de Compostela
- Known for: First female Scientist to work on British and Spanish exploration ships
- Awards: Silver Medal of Galicia awarded by the King and Queen of Spain in 1993
- Scientific career
- Fields: Oceanography; Marine biology
- Workplaces: Spanish Institution of Oceanography; Woods Hole Oceanographic Institution; Scripps Institution of Oceanography; National Marine Fisheries Service

María de los Ángeles Alvariño González (Spanish pronunciation: [maˈɾia ðe los ˈaŋxeles alβaˈɾiɲo ɣonˈθaleθ], October 3, 1916 – May 29, 2005), known as Ángeles Alvariño, was a Spanish fishery research biologist and oceanographer globally recognized as an authority in plankton biology. She was the first woman ever appointed as scientist aboard any British or Spanish exploration ship. She discovered 22 new species of marine animals and published over a hundred scientific books, essays, and articles. In her late career she studied the history of early marine scientific exploration.

== Early days ==
María de los Ángeles Alvariño Gonzalez was born in Serantes (Ferrol, Galicia), Spain on October 3, 1916, the daughter of Antonio Alvariño Grimaldos, a physician, and Maria del Carmen Gonzales Diaz-Saavedra de Alvariño. From an early age she showed an interest in the natural sciences and read her father's book on zoology. She attended the lycée Concepcion Arenal in Ferrol and in 1931 attended the University of Santiago de Compostela where she graduated summa cum laude in 1933. The titles of her dissertations were "Social Insects" and "Women in Don Quixote".

"Creativity and imagination are the basic ingredients for the scientists, as in the arts, because science is an art…" she later explained when she was asked about her diverse interests.

In 1934, she was admitted at the Complutense University of Madrid to study Natural Sciences, but had to interrupt her studies as a consequence of the Spanish Civil War. During this period, she devoted herself to the study of English and French, which later proved to be very useful for the development of her research career in the United States.

In 1940, she married Eugenio Leira Manso, captain of the Spanish War Navy and Knight of the Royal and Military Order of Saint Hermenegild. Two years later, their daughter was born, Maria de los Angeles Leira Alvariño, who is now a well-renowned architect and urbanist based in the US.

After the Civil War, Ángeles Alvariño resumed her studies, and in 1941, she earned her master's degree in Natural Sciences by the University of Madrid. Ángeles Álvariño returned with her husband to Ferrol where, from 1941 to 1948, she taught biology, zoology, botany, and geology as a professor at various schools. In 1948, she moved back with her family to Madrid to work as a fishery research biologist with the Department of Sea Fisheries. Alvariño could not pursue further research studies at the Spanish Institute of Oceanography in Madrid due to a dated Spanish law that prohibited women aboard Spanish naval vessels. However, because she had outstanding academic credentials, she was allowed to take some courses and do some research. In 1951, she received a graduate diploma in Experimental Psychology, Analytical Chemistry and Plant Ecology from the Complutense University of Madrid.

In 1950, she moved back to Galicia and worked at the Spanish Oceanographic Institute in Vigo. In 1953, she received a scholarship from the British Council to conduct research on zooplankton in the Marine Biological Association laboratory at Plymouth, England, under the direction of the well-respected experts in zooplankton Frederick S. Russell and Peter C. Corbin. Zooplankton comprise the small floating animals in the ocean that serve as food for other animals and include jellyfish, coral, and sea anemones. These creatures had barely been studied before the 1960s, and she focused in three groups: the microscopic Chaetognatha, which are carnivorous and feed on other plankton; the colonial Siphonophore, which cluster in groups of individuals of the same species (like the Portuguese Man'o'War); and the medusa or jellyfish. By studying the plankton of the English Channel and in the Bay of Biscay, her work led to the discovery of some anomalies in the distribution of plankton species which led to the scientific conclusion that the Atlantic waters had moved poleward in an unusual way. María de los Ángeles Alvariño was the first woman to be appointed as scientist aboard a British research vessel. Throughout her life, she participated in several expeditions and scientific cruises in the Atlantic and Pacific, aboard oceanographic ships from England, America, Spain and Mexico.

In 1954, Alvariño returned to Spain to continue her research on zooplankton. She designed special nets and recruited fishermen and naval research vessels to sample plankton for her in the Atlantic near Spain and near Newfoundland, and in the Mediterranean.

== In Mexico ==
Alvariño collaborated with the then National Institute of Fisheries (Now IMIPAS) on behalf of the United Nations Food and Agriculture Organization to train the institute's initial staff, including Maria Concepcion Rodriguez de la Cruz, among others.

== In the United States ==
In 1956, María de los Ángeles received a fellowship from the Fulbright Commission to conduct scientific work at the Woods Hole Oceanographic Institute on Cape Cod in Massachusetts, where she worked with Dr. Mary Sears, who was the president of the U.S. Oceanographic Congress and also a zooplankton researcher. Her career ramped up when Dr. Mary Sears, impressed with the quality of her research, recommended Ángeles Alvariño to Dr. Roger Revelle, the director of the Scripps Institution of Oceanography, part of the University of California San Diego, who offered her a position as a biologist. She worked at UCSD from 1958 to 1969 where she studied the zooplankton off the coast of California as well as the Atlantic, Pacific and Indian Oceans. During this period she discovered 12 new Chaetognatha species, nine siphonophore and one medusa. She also produced a model of the world's distribution of different species of Chaetognatha and Siphonophora. This research formed the basis of her doctoral dissertation; she received a PhD from the University of Madrid in 1967. She received various grants from institutions such as the U.S. Office of the Navy, the California Cooperative Oceanic Fisheries Investigations, and the US National Science Foundation.

In January 1970, she was appointed to a position as Fisheries Research Biologist at the prestigious Southwest Fisheries Science Center (which is part of the National Oceanic and Atmospheric Administration). Here she continued her research in Chaetognatha, Siphonophora, and studied the relationship between the predatory behavior of these organisms and the survival of fish larvae. She also studied the distribution of Chaetognatha and Siphonophora species in the Pacific and Antarctic Oceans, and plankton movement, in particular the effect of plankton introductions through pollution or ship movements.

In the later 1970s, Alvariño worked to coordinate oceanic research among Latin American nations, and she studied the Antarctic. During this period she received various grants from the Food and Agriculture Organization of the United Nations (FAO) and from the United Nations Educational, Scientific, and Cultural Organization (UNESCO).

She retired as an emeritus Scientist in 1993 but continued to conduct research on seagoing vessels hosted by various countries. Towards the end of her life, Ángeles Alvariño devoted herself to study the early history of scientific exploration. She looked closely into the scientific discoveries of early Spanish explorers and navigators who first mapped the oceans and their currents. As part of these investigations, she published a full account of the Malaspina Expedition, the first scientific oceanic expedition that traveled throughout the western Atlantic Ocean and the Pacific Ocean from 1789 to 1794.

Throughout her life, Ángeles Alvariño also served as a faculty member at the National Autonomous University of Mexico in 1976; at San Diego State University from 1979 to 1982; and later, at the University of San Diego from 1982 to 1985. She also was a visiting professor at the Federal University of Paraná in Brazil in 1982, and at the National Polytechnic Institute of Mexico from 1982 to 1986. During these years Alvariño directed the doctoral research of several students and served on thesis committees in various countries.

Upon her death in San Diego (California), on 29 May 2005, she left a finished manuscript on the birds and marine animals found in the Malaspina Expedition that she had previously studied. This project will soon be completed and translated by her daughter.

== Scientific achievement and public recognition ==
Two planktonic species are named after her, the chaetognath Aidanosagitta alvarinoae (Pathansali, 1974) and the hydromedusa Lizzia alvarinoae (Segura, 1980).

She was a fellow of the American Institute of Fishery Research Biologists and of the San Diego Society of Natural History, as well as being a member of the Biological Society of Washington and the Hispano-American Association of Researchers on Marine Sciences.

In recognition of her outstanding scientific career, in 1993 Ángeles Alvarinño received the Great Silver Medal of Galicia from King Juan Carlos I and Queen Sophia of Spain. The University of A Coruña dedicated the Week of Sciences to her in 2005, and the City of Ferrol paid a posthumous tribute in the Campus of Esteiro, where a commemorative plaque honors one of the most prominent women scientists in the world.

The Government of Galicia awards the Ánxeles Alvariño Postdoctoral Fellowships, named after her.

A research vessel of the Spanish Institute of Oceanography is named "Ángeles Alvariño". The vessel was launched in 2012 by Ángeles's daughter, Maria de los Angeles Leira Alvariño.

Google created a Doodle for its home page in many countries on October 3, 2021, to celebrate the 105th birthday of Dr. Ángeles Alvariño.

== Taxonomy ==
During her career Alvariño discovered 22 new marine species, and revised their morphology at the different development stages by using illustrations and personal notes. She specialized in Jellyfish, Siphonophorae, Chaetognatha and Hydrozoa. These are the species that she described as new:

- Sagitta bierii Alvariño, 1961; chaetognath (accepted as Serratosagitta bierii Alvariño, 1961)
- Sagitta euneritica Alvariño, 1961; chaetognath (accepted as Parasagitta euneritica Alvariño, 1961)
- Sagitta scrippsae Alvariño, 1962; chaetognath (accepted as Pseudosagitta lyra Krohn, 1853)
- Eukrohnia bathypelagica Alvariño, 1962; chaetognath
- Sagitta bruuni Alvariño, 1967; chaetognath (accepted as Zonosagitta bruuni Alvarino, 1967)
- Sagitta nagae Alvariño, 1967; chaetognath (accepted as Zonosagitta nagae (Alvariño, 1967))
- Sagitta tokiokai Alvariño, 1967; chaetognath (accepted as Ferosagitta robusta Doncaster, 1902)
- Vogtia kuruae Alvariño, 1967; siphonophore (accepted as Vogtia serrata Moser, 1915)
- Enneanogonum searsae Alvariño, 1968; siphonophore (accepted as Enneagonum hyalinum Quoy & Gaimard, 1827)
- Sulculeolaria brintoni Alvariño, 1968; siphonophore (accepted as Sulculeolaria quadrivalvis Blainville, 1830)
- Krohnitta mutabbii Alvariño, 1969; chaetognath (accepted as Krohnitta pacifica Aida, 1897)
- Spadella hummelinck Alvariño, 1970; chaetognath (accepted as Paraspadella pulchella Owre, 1963)
- Spadella gaetanoi Alvariño, 1978; chaetognath
- Spadella legazpichessi Alvariño, 1981; chaetognath (accepted as Paraspadella legazpichessi Alvariño, 1981)
- Nectocarmen antonioi Alvariño, 1983; siphonophore (accepted as Praya dubia Quoy & Gaimard, 1833)
- Heteropyramis alcala Alvariño, 1983; siphonophore(accepted as Heteropyramis maculata Moser, 1925)
- Thalassophyes ferrarii Alvariño, 1983; siphonophore (accepted as Crystallophyes amygdalina Moser, 1925)
- Lensia eltanin Alvariño, 1984; siphonophore (accepted as Lensia achilles Totton, 1941)
- Lensia landrumae Alvariño, 1984; siphonophore (accepted as Lensia hunter Totton, 1941)
- Lensia eugenioi Alvariño, 1985; siphonophore (accepted as Lensia campanella Moser, 1917)
- Spadella pimukatharos Alvariño, 1987; chaetognath
- Pandea cybeles Alvariño, 1988; medusozoa

== Eponymous species ==
- Aidanosagitta alvarinoae (arrow worm)
- Lizzia alvarinoae (jellyfish)
