= Fonseca Prize =

- Awarded for: Popularization of science
- Location: Santiago de Compostela
- Country: Spain
- Presented by: University of Santiago de Compostela; Consortium of Santiago
- Reward: € 6,000
- First award: 2008
- Website: Premio Fonseca

The Fonseca Prize of science communication (Galician: Premio Fonseca) is an annual award created by the University of Santiago de Compostela and the Consortium of Santiago under the auspices of the Program ConCiencia.

The award is named after Alonso III Fonseca, one of the earliest patrons of the university.

== Recipients ==
Year	Recipient	Country	Rationale
2008	Stephen Hawking	United Kingdom	"For his exceptional mastery in the popularization of complex concepts in Physics at the very edge of our current understanding of the Universe, combined with the highest scientific excellence, and for becoming a public reference of science worldwide."
2009	James Lovelock	United Kingdom	"For his leadership and his pioneering character in the construction of the current environmental awareness, of which he is a public international reference, and for his sharing of important scientific concepts with members of society; all of the above in combination with an exemplary freedom and independence of thought, and outstanding brilliance and talent, which has made it possible the achieving of exceptional results in different fields of scientific knowledge."
2010	David Attenborough	United Kingdom	"For his pioneering role in the spreading of the wildlife, making it accessible to huge audiences with an original outlook that has been a real turning point in the popularization of nature through television broadcasting, and for having become an international public reference for science communication."
2011	Roger Penrose	United Kingdom	"For his outstanding skills in science communication, placing the reader at the forefront of knowledge in a vast multidisciplinary range, from the understanding of the universe to the mysteries of human mind, in the same creative and alternative way that has characterized his brilliant scientific trajectory"
