= Program ConCiencia =

The Program ConCiencia is an initiative of science communication created in 2006 by the Universidad de Santiago de Compostela and the Consorcio de Santiago. It is based on visits to Santiago de Compostela of Nobel Laureates or analogous laureates in mathematics (Fields Medal, Abel Prize) and computer science (Turing Award). Since 2008 this program organizes also the Fonseca Prize of science communication, which so far has been awarded to Stephen W. Hawking, James Lovelock, Sir David Attenborough and Sir Roger Penrose.

== Participants ==
- Heinrich Rohrer (Nobel Physics 1986)
- Torsten N. Wiesel (Nobel Physiology or Medicine 1981)
- Richard R. Ernst (Nobel Chemistry 1991)
- Sir Michael Atiyah (Fields Medal 1966, Abel Prize 2004)
- Frank Wilczek (Nobel Physics 2004)
- John E. Walker (Nobel Chemistry 1997)
- Peter Lax (Abel Prize 2005)
- John F. Nash (Nobel Economy 1994)
- Harold E. Varmus (Nobel Physiology or Medicine 1989)
- Frances E. Allen (Turing Award 2006)
- Gerardus 't Hooft (Nobel Physics 1999)
- K. Barry Sharpless (Nobel Chemistry 2001 and 2022)
- Jean-Marie Lehn (Nobel Chemistry 1987)
- James Watson Cronin (Nobel Physics 1980)
- Roger David Kornberg (Nobel Chemistry 2006)
- Albert Fert (Nobel Physics 2007)
- Sir Harold Walter Kroto (Nobel Chemistry 1996)
- Sir Richard J. Roberts (Nobel Physiology or Medicine 1993)
- Ada E. Yonath (Nobel Chemistry 2009)
- Mohamed ElBaradei (Nobel Peace 2005)
- Samuel Chao Chung Ting (Nobel Physics 1976)
- Richard R. Schrock (Nobel Chemistry 2005)
- Sheldon Glashow (Nobel Physics 1979)
- Ei-ichi Negishi (Nobel Chemistry 2010)
- Sir Tim Hunt (Nobel Physiology or Medicine 2001)
- Sir Anthony J. Leggett (Nobel Physics 2003)
- Eric A. Cornell (Nobel Physics 2001)
- Harald zur Hausen (Nobel Physiology or Medicine 2008)
- Claude Cohen-Tannoudji (Nobel Physics 1997)
- Cédric Villani (Fields Medal 2010)
- Serge Haroche (Nobel Physics 2012)
- Stanley B. Prusiner (Nobel Physiology or Medicine 1997)
- Finn E. Kydland (Nobel Economy 2004)
- May-Britt Moser (Nobel Physiology or Medicine 2014)
- Jean-Pierre Sauvage (Nobel Chemistry 2016)
- Bernard L. Feringa (Nobel Chemistry 2016)
- Tomas Lindahl (Nobel Chemistry 2015)
- David MacMillan (Nobel Chemistry 2021)
- Stanley Whittingham (Nobel Chemistry 2019)
- David Chipperfield (Pritzker Prize 2023)
- Klaus von Klitzing (Nobel Physics 1985)
- Kip S. Thorne (Nobel Physics 2017)
- Anne L'Huillier (Nobel Physics 2023)
