= RAHI Foundation =

Support centre in New Delhi, India

- Established: 1996
- Founders: Anuja Gupta, Ashwini Ailawadi
- Location: I-1804 Second Floor, Chittaranjan Park, New Delhi - 110019

The RAHI Foundation (Recovering and Healing from Incest) is a support centre, based in New Delhi, India.

The Foundation was established in August 1996 by Anuja Gupta and Ashwini Ailawadi on the basis of the prestigious Fellowship for Population Innovations of the John D. and Catherine T. MacArthur Foundation received by Anuja Gupta, Director of RAHI. Its founding trustees are Anuja Gupta and Jaya Sharma.

The centre is dedicated to providing individual and group services for survivors aimed at their psychological, emotional, sexual and spiritual recovery. RAHI offers its consultation and supervision to other individual and groups working with incest survivors. It works closely with individuals and organizations interested in starting survivor groups in other parts of the country. It is involved in conceptualizing and planning stages and offers clinical supervision and guidance for the running of the group. RAHI also provides individual supervision to practitioners and other NGOs on their incest cases.
