= Type 645 oceanographic research ship =

Oceanographic ship

The Type 645 oceanographic research ship is an oceanographic ship developed by China for the People's Liberation Army Navy (PLAN) and other Chinese civilian establishments. Type 645 was an experimental program of the Fourth five-year plan of China and designed by the 2nd Directorate of 708th Institute of China State Shipbuilding Corporation, which is also more commonly known as China Shipbuilding and Oceanic Engineering Design Academy (中国船舶及海洋工程设计研究) nowadays. Construction begun in October 1977 and the ship was launched in October 1978, entering service with PLAN in December 1978. There are a total of twelve laboratories on board totaling 257 square meters. Deployment proved that the design was successful, and three more units were built for civilian use, named as Xiangyanghong (向阳红, meaning facing the Sun in red in Chinese) 9, Xiangyanghong 14 and Xiangyanghong 16 respectively. However, on May 2, 1993, Xiangyanghong 16 was rammed and sunk by a Cypriot LNG carrier more than nine time of its size (38000 ton) in the East China Sea near Jeju Island, with the loss of three crew members. The sister ships in civilian service are often tasked with military and paramilitary missions and thus frequently come under PLAN and Chinese Coast Guard control.

In addition to the original oceanographic research ship, the hull of Type 645 is used for both Type 812 and Type 813 spy ships, but the former was a failure due to excessive vibration preventing onboard intelligence gathering gears from working properly, and thus converted back to its original oceanographic research role. Type 813 was much more successful based on the experienced learned from the unsuccessful Type 812. The name of the unit in PLAN service is Nan-Diao (南调) 350, meaning South Investigate 350. In 2006, the ship went through an 11-month-long refit to be converted by Shanghai Lifeng Shipyard (上海立丰船厂) of China Shipping Group at Shanghai as the mother ship of Jiaolong (submersible). After conversion, some oceanographic research capability is retained after the conversion in that three laboratories were retained on board. The homeport of Xiangyanghong 9 is in Qingdao. In 2019, Xiangyanghong 14 completed similar upgrade in Guangzhou Shipyard. Specification:

- Length (m): 112.05
- Length between perpendiculars (m): 97.55
- Depth (m): 8.2
- Width (m): 15.2
- Draft (m): 5.5
- Displacement (t): 4435
- Speed (kn): 19.35
- Range (nmi): 10000 @ 17 kn
- Endurance (day): 60
- Crew: 150
- Main propulsion: two 9ESDZ43/82B low speed diesel engines @ 3308 kW (4500 hp) w/ 200 rpm
- Auxiliary propulsion: four 6260GZC-II, TFH-400/10 @ 70 kW (640 hp) w/ 600 rpm

Type	NATO designation	Pennant No.	Name (English)	Name (Han 中文)	Builder	Commissioned	Displacement	Fleet	Status
Type 645 oceanographic research ship (AGOR)	?	Nan-Diao 350	South Investigation 350	南调 350	Hudong-Zhonghua Shipbuilding	December 1978	4435 t	South Sea Fleet	Active
Type 645 oceanographic research ship (AGOR)	?	Xiang-Yang-Hong 9	Facing the Red Sun 9	向阳红 9	Hudong-Zhonghua Shipbuilding	June 1981	4435 t	North Sea Fleet	Active
Type 645 oceanographic research ship (AGOR)	?	Xiang-Yang-Hong 14	Facing the Red Sun 14	向阳红 14	Hudong-Zhonghua Shipbuilding	July 1981	4400 t	North Sea Fleet	Active
