= Julio Abalde =

Spanish biologist and professor

- Julio Ernesto Abalde Alonso
- Citizenship: Spain
- Occupation: Biologist
- Awards: Doctor honoris causa by Tbilisi State University

Academic background
- Education: Universidade de Santiago de Compostela
- Thesis: (1986)

Academic work
- Discipline: Biology
- Sub-discipline: Microbiology
- Institutions: Universidade da Coruña, Universidade de Santiago de Compostela

Rector of Universidade da Coruña
- Incumbent
- Assumed office 13 January 2016
- Preceded by: Xosé Luis Armesto

Personal details
- Party: Socialists' Party of Galicia
- Website: http://pdi.udc.es/es/File/Pdi/ZE9AF

Julio Abalde is a Spanish university professor of microbiology. On 3 December 2015, he was elected rector of Universidade da Coruña.

== Academic career ==
Abalde obtained a PhD from Universidade de Santiago de Compostela in 1986, starting his teaching career one year earlier at the university college that this university had in A Coruña. In 1988, he became associate professor of microbiology of that university, moving to Universidade da Coruña with the same academic rank when the former university college gained independent university status in 1991. He remained in that position until he became full professor in 2010. His research has focused on the biotechnology of microalgae, their mass production and aquaculture use, and their physiological stress under the environmental presence of pollutants, heavy metals and pesticides, and he is the author of influential publications in this field. Before becoming rector of Universidade da Coruña in 2017, he carried out various managerial functions at Universidade de Santiago de Compostela, Universidade da Coruña, and the Agency for the Quality of the University System of Galicia (ACSUG).

== Political career ==
In March 2017, there were rumors that he could be a candidate to the leadership of the Socialists' Party of Galicia, which he denied, arguing that his ambition was focused on Universidade da Coruña.

== Awards and distinctions ==
In 2018, he was awarded an honorary doctorate by the Ivane Javakhishvili Tbilisi State University on the occasion of its centenary.
