= Institute of Agricultural Biodiversity and Rural Development =

Institute of Agricultural Biodiversity and Rural Development - IBADER
- Instituto de Biodiversidade Agraria e Desenvovlemento Rural - IBADER
- Type: public
- Established: 2001
- Academic staff: 78
- Location: Lugo, Galicia, Spain; 42°59′31.8″N 7°32′56.8″W
- Campus: Urban
- Website: ibader.org

The Agricultural Biodiversity and Rural Development Institute - IBADER is a research university joint institute, created in 2001, with headquarters in the city of Lugo. This institution belongs to the University of Santiago de Compostela in its Campus from Lugo. Nowadays is formed by the University of Santiago de Compostela, Xunta de Galicia and Deputación Provincial de Lugo.

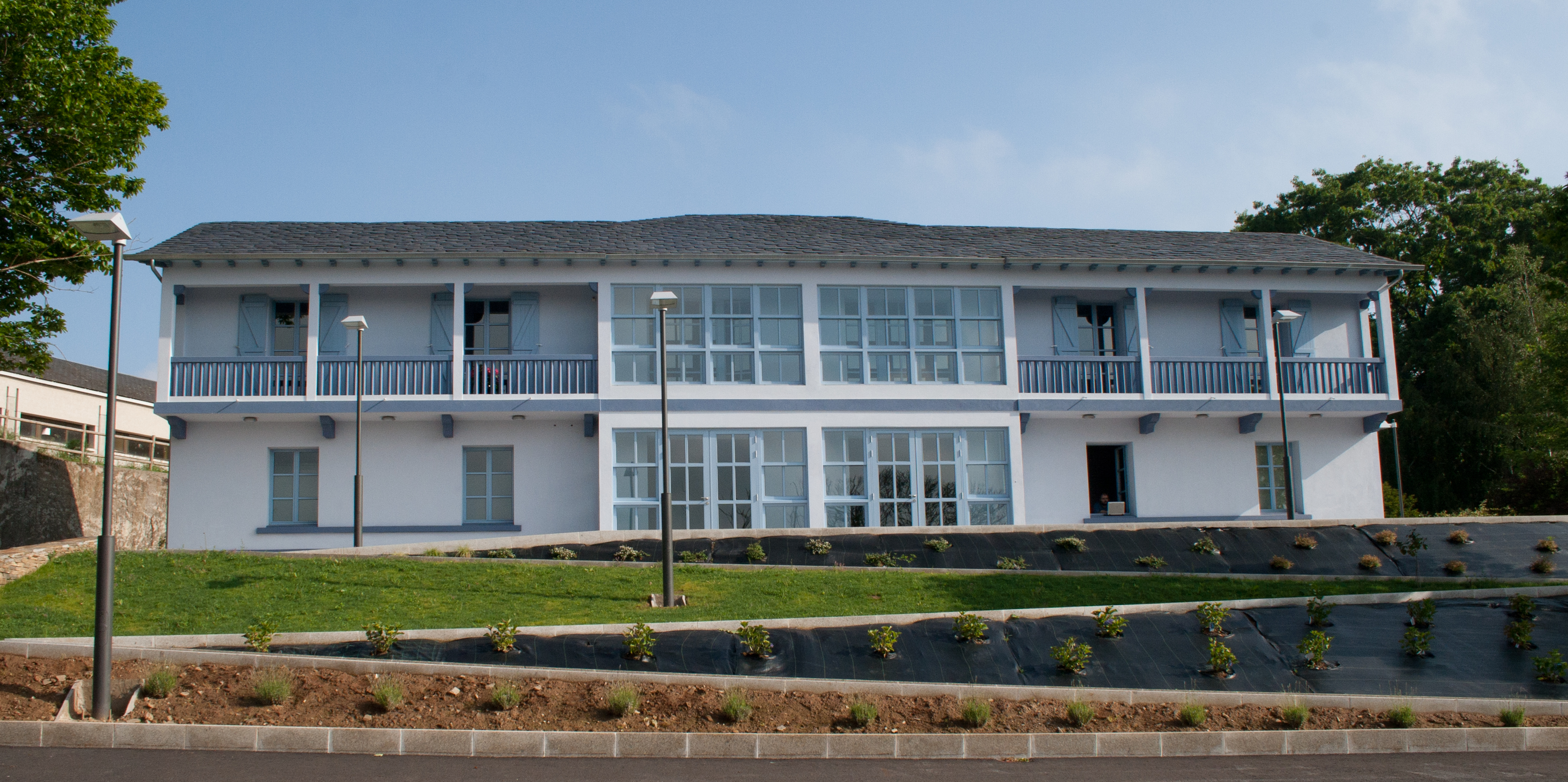
Institute of Agricultural Biodiversity and Rural Development - IBADER

== Aims ==
The main aims of this institute are:

- to study the implementation of new opportunities of rural development in the Galician country through research on conservation research and management of biodiversity and rural environment.
- to open new working trades for students of agricultural degrees, and for student and teacher exchange programs, especially in Latin-American countries
- to collaborate with similar centres, both European and Latin-American, in the training of specialized technicians by developing third cycle programs
- to be a permanent forum to celebrate meetings and discuss activities which might benefit the Galician country.

== Research groups ==
There are 6 research groups of the la University of Santiago de Compostela assigned to the Institute of Agricultural Biodiversity and Rural Development, having more than 70 researchers.

- GI-1248 – Agricultural and forest soils: nutrient dynamics, management and use of wastes
- GI-1648 – Silvopastoral Systems
- GI-1649 – Organic Waste Management, Fertilization and Agroecology
- GI-1729 – Animal genetic resources and their productions
- GI-1934 – Land, Biodiversity
