= José Daporta Gozález =

José Daporta González
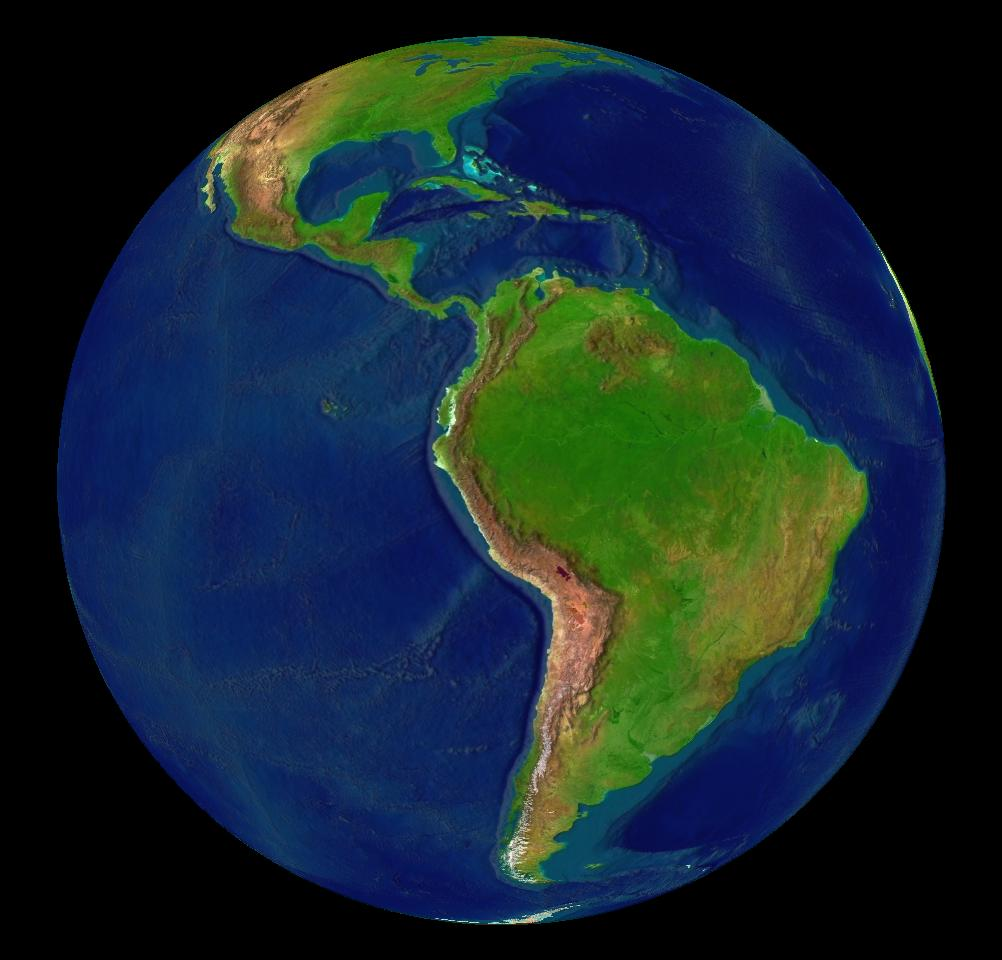
- His family was originally from Serantes, Ferrol, Spain
- Born: 1911; Havana, Cuba
- Died: 1989 (aged 77–78); Santiago de Compostela, Spain
- Education: Cuba and Latin America together with Serantes, Ferrol, Santiago de Compostela, Galicia and Spain
- Known for: Professor of Hygiene and Microbiology Faculty of Medicine (USC); Initiate and develop cooperation nexuses with different Latin-American countries “Galician Ambassador for Latin-America” in the early 1940s Contributing to the creation of the “Galician Institute for Cooperation with Latin-America” Insatiable interest in culture and social anthropology Owner of one of the most important fine arts collections in Galicia.
- Awards: Numerous Awards and Prizes
- Scientific career
- Fields: Hygiene; Microbiology
- Workplaces: University of Santiago de Compostela; Galician Institute for Cooperation with Latin-America; Clinical Analysis Institute (USC)

Notes
- Unfortunately, the Foundation and Museum of Fine arts which was meant to be opened in Santiago de Compostela after his death, never came to fruition.

José Daporta González (1911–1989) was a professor of Hygiene and Microbiology as well as a prolific Fine arts Collector. Born in Habana (Cuba), the son of Galician emigrants, he returned to the land of his parents at an early age, where he started and finished his university studies, to become a professor of the University of Santiago de Compostela at a young age.

He devoted himself to his teaching career and to initiate and develop cooperation nexuses with different Latin-American countries; starting his work as a "Galician Ambassador for Latin-America" in the early 1940s and contributing to the creation of the "Galician Institute for Cooperation with Latin-America".

It is important to mention Daporta's interest in culture and social anthropology, which contributed develop his skills as a tireless collector of all sorts of cultural objects from every single corner of the globe. At the time of his death in 1989 (in Santiago de Compostela) he was the owner of one of the most important fine arts collections in Galicia.

Unfortunately, the Foundation and Museum of Fine arts which was meant to be opened in Santiago de Compostela after his death, never came to fruition.

== See also ==
- University of Santiago de Compostela
