= Type 813 spy ship =

Chinese spy ship

History

China
- Name: Neptune (852)
- Builder: Hudong-Zhonghua Shipbuilding
- Laid down: September 1980
- Launched: September 1982
- Commissioned: April 1983

General characteristics
- Class & type: Type 813 Xiangyanghong 21-class spy ship
- Displacement: 4,590 t (4,520 long tons)
- Length: 112.22 m (368.2 ft)
- Beam: 15.2 m (50 ft)
- Draft: 5.5 m (18 ft)
- Propulsion: 2 x 9ESDZ43/82B medium/low speed diesel engines @ 3308 kW (4500 hp) w/ 200 rpm
- Speed: 19 kn (22 mph)
- Range: 12,000 nmi (14,000 mi) @ 17 kn (20 mph)
- Complement: 150

The Type 813 spy ship is the first purpose-built, indigenously designed spy ship entering service with the People's Liberation Army Navy (PLAN).

The ship is the result of the urgent need of specialized spy ship for intelligence gathering missions in the mid-1970s, and to speed up the program, it was decided in October 1976 that the newly constructed spy ship would share the same hull of Type 645 oceanographic research ship. Design begun in August 1977 by the 2nd Directorate of the 708th Institute of China State Shipbuilding Corporation, which is also more commonly known as China Shipbuilding and Oceanic Engineering Design Academy (中国船舶及海洋工程设计研究) nowadays. Design work was completed in September 1980 and construction immediately begun in the same month. There are a total of ten sets of reconnaissance equipment on board and the ship entered service with South Sea Fleet. The ship is designed to withstand storm with wind scale of 12. Originally named as Xiangyanghong (向阳红) 21, the ship was later renamed as Haiwangxing. After the ship has been transferred to Chinese Coast Guard and received pennant number 3469, it was replaced by a Type 815A spy ship with the same name.

Type	Pennant #	Name	Builder	Laid down	Launched	Commissioned	Status	Fleet
813	852	Haiwangxing (海王星)	Hudong-Zhonghua Shipbuilding	Sep 1980	Sep 1982	Apr 1983	Retired	South Sea Fleet
