= Eulalia Pérez Sedeño =

Philosopher and professor

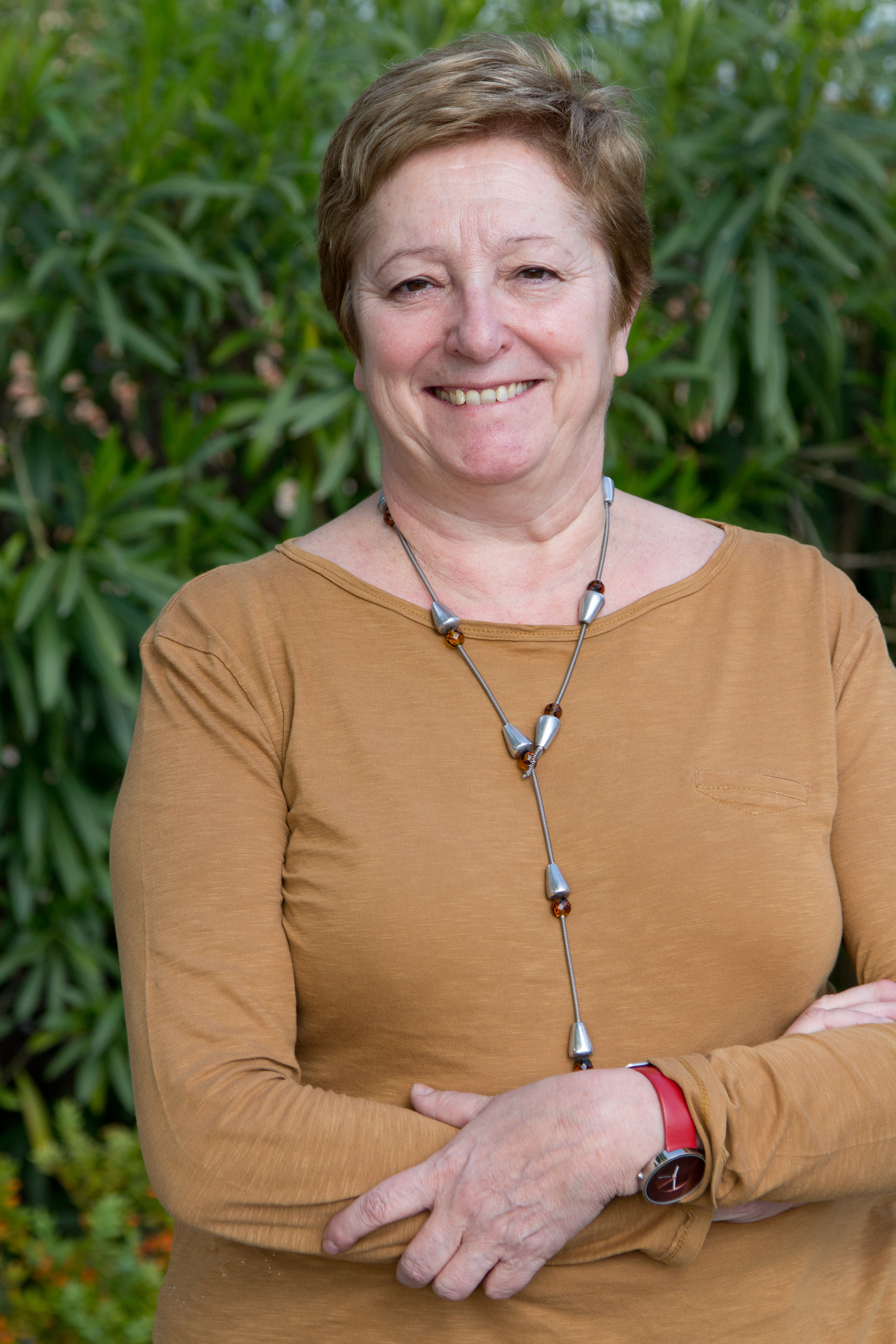
- Born: 1954 (age 71–72); Morocco
- Education: Autonomous University of Madrid

Eulalia Pérez Sedeño (born 1954 in Morocco), is a Moroccan-born Spanish philosopher, a specialist in science, technology, and gender and professor of investigation in the Department of science, technology and society of the Institute of Philosophy Higher Council of Scientific Research (Consejo Superior de Investigaciones Científicas, CSIC).

== Biography ==
Pérez Sedeño obtained a degree in Philosophy at the autonomous University of Madrid (UAM) in 1976 and then her PhD at the same university in 1985 with a thesis on the History of ancient astronomy.

In 1988, she completed a research trip at the University of Cambridge under professor Geoffrey Lloyd. It was at this time that she began her research on the antiquity and women, which would give birth to gender studies as she continued her return to Spain that same year, when Celia Amorós suggested working on women, or the question of gender, through the ages, for example in the field of ptolemaic astronomy. In 1993 she published in the journal ARBOR: Ciencia, Pensamiento y Culture, special Issue of Women & Science. While she was at the University of California, Berkeley in 1994, Pérez Sedeño initiated the research on science, technology and gender studies.

In 1999, she was appointed to the chair of Logic and Philosophy of science at the University of the Basque Country (UPV), where it remained until 2002 when she joined the Institute of Philosophy of the CSIC.

Since 1996, she has been a member of the Scientific Committee of "Congreso Iberoamericano de Ciencia, Tecnología y Género", biennial congress which is held alternately in Spain and in Ibero-America, the last edition having been held in October 2014 in Paraguay, the previous edition in Spain took place in Seville in 2012.

Between 2006 and 2008 she is the executive director of the Spanish Foundation for science and technology (Fundacion Española para la Ciencia y la Tecnología, FECYT).

Currently, she is Professor of Investigation in Science, Technology and Gender, Department of Science, Technology and Society, Institute of Philosophy of the higher Council of scientific research and is the director of this department.

== Work ==
She has conducted research in History of ancient science and of scientific institutions, as well as in the Philosophy of science, Science, Technology and Society (CTS), Perception and communication of science and Science, Technology and Gender. She has participated in many national and international projects and she has directed several research projects:

- Science and values: gender and the theories and scientific institutions (1996-1999, funded by the CICYT)
- Of scientific theories to the culture and practice of science-technology (1999-2002, funded by the Ministry of Science and Technology)
- GENTEC: Gènere, tecnologia i ciència has Iberoamèrica (Gender, technology, and science in Ibero-America) (2002-2004, funded by the Organization of Ibero-American States and UNESCO)
- The situation of women in the Spanish education system and its international context (2003, Ministry of Education, Culture and Sports)
- Training programs and mobility of the investigative staff of direct flow and reverse: problems, challenges and solutions (Ministry of Education and Science, 2005)
- Interactions of CTS of the Science Biosociales and Medical Technology (CICYT 2004-2006)
- Sciences and technologies of the body from a perspective CTS (Ministry of Education and Science 2007-2009)
- A situation that is unique, a universe to discover (CSIC, 2008-2009),
- Cartographies of the body (Ministry of Science, 2010-2012)
- Visions and versions of biomedical technologies: governance, public participation and innovations hidden (Ministry of Economy and Competitiveness, 2013-2015)

== Awards and recognition ==
- President of the Society of Logic, Methodology and Philosophy of Science in Spain (2000-2006)
- Partner founder of the Association of Women Researchers and Technologists, and vice-president (2001-2006).
- Assistant coordinator of the department of Philology and Philosophy of the National Agency of evaluation and Prospective (Agència Nacional d Avaluació i Prospectiva, ANEP) of the Directorate-General of Scientific Investigation and Technician, currently the Ministry of Economy and Competitiveness (2005-2006)

In 2001, she was awarded the 9th Prize of Disclosure as "Feminist Carmen de Burgos" for her article La invisibilidad y techo de cristal awarded by the University of Málaga since 1993.

== Publications ==
She has published and edited numerous books and articles.

- MUJER Y CIENCIA. The situación de las mujeres investigadoras en el sistema español de ciencia y tecnología (2008)
- Ciencia, tecnología y valores desde una perspectiva de género (2005)
- Igualdad y equidad en ciencia y tecnología: el caso iberoamericano (2008)
- Mitos, creencias, valores: cómo hacer más "científica" ciencia; cómo hacer la "realidad" más real (2008)
- Conocimiento e innovación (2009)
- Un Universo por descubrir: Género y astronomía en España (2010)
- Lenguaje y ciencia (2011)
- Cuerpos y diferencias (2012)
- Cartografías del cuerpo: Biopolíticas de la ciencia y la tecnología (2014)

== See also ==
- Feminism
- Philosophy of science
