= Jaya Sharma (activist) =

Indian queer feminist author

Jaya Sharma is a queer feminist author based in New Delhi, India. She identifies as a queer feminist activist, working on issues of gender, education and sexuality. As the founder of Nirantar and part of the sexuality education initiative within Nirantar, she is involved with capacity building, research and advocacy.

== Life and career ==
She is a founder member of Nirantar, a Centre for Gender and Education based in New Delhi. Nirantar is an NGO based in India that deals with feminist and LGBT issues. She has been working on the rights and education of women and the LGBTQ+ community for over fifteen years.

She co-founded Pitara, a rural magazine which aimed at sustaining literacy in rural spaces by publishing relatable local and international news. This project was supported by Nirantar. The programme started in the wake of the total literacy campaign, and stopped functioning in 2010.

She is also the founder trustee of RAHI, an organization that works with women who are survivors of incest and Child sexual abuse. She also advocates for adolescent education and sexuality education. She also works on sexuality with women from marginalized communities through workshops.

She is also a co-founder of The Kinky collective, an Indian BDSM community that aims at destroying myths about the community practices.

== Academic work ==
She has authored papers on pleasure vs danger binary, which address the lack of agency rural and marginalized women felt over their sexuality before and after perspective changing workshop.

She also co-authored a landscape analysis of early child marriage in India. The research was approached from a feminist perspective, analysing the influence of sociocultural norms on gender and sexuality. The research also considers interventions which could be further used by the government, NGOs, and researchers so they can empower girls to achieve greater autonomy over their lives.
