= Xiang Yang Hong =

Xiang Yang Hong (Chinese: 向阳红; lit. 'Facing the Red Sun') are a class of Chinese oceanographic survey and research ships. These were among China's first ocean survey vessels.

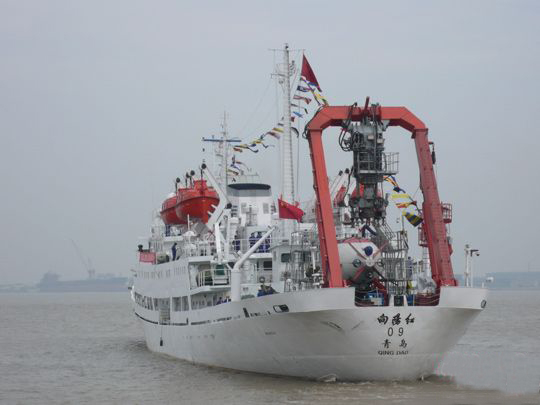
Xiang yang hong 09

== Fleet list ==
- Xiang Yang Hong 01
- Xiang Yang Hong 03 — built 2016
- Xiang Yang Hong 05
- Xiang Yang Hong 06
- Xiang Yang Hong 09 — built 1978
- Xiang Yang Hong 10
- Xiang Yang Hong 14 — Type 645 oceanographic research ship
- Xiang Yang Hong 16 —
- Xiang Yang Hong 21 — Type 813 spy ship

== Xiang Yang Hong 09 ==
The Xiang Yang Hong 09 was the first Chinese ship to take part in distant-water research in the 1970s. 2006 onwards the ship successfully supported submersibles, including supporting the domestic record dive in Mariana Trench.

| Number | Length (m) | Displacement (t) | Designer | Builder | Launched | Status |
|---|---|---|---|---|---|---|
| Xiang Yang Hong 09 | 112.05 | 4425 | China State Shipbuilding Corporation | Hudong-Zhonghua Shipbuilding | 1978 | Active |

== In popular culture ==
The second book of Ian Douglas's Star Carrier contained a reference to a Chinese ship named Xiang Yang Hong which had used nuclear warheads to alter the course of an asteroid.
