= History of research ships =

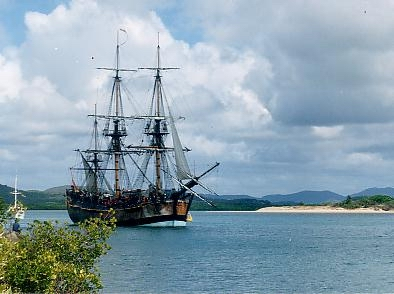
Endeavour replica in Cooktown harbour

The research ship had origins in the early voyages of exploration. By the time of James Cook's Endeavour, the essentials of what today we would call a research ship are clearly apparent. In 1766, the Royal Society hired Cook to travel to the Pacific Ocean to observe and record the transit of Venus across the Sun. The Endeavour was a sturdy boat, well designed and equipped for the ordeals she would face, and fitted out with facilities for her research personnel, Joseph Banks. And, as is common with contemporary research vessels, Endeavour carried out more than one kind of research, including comprehensive hydrographic survey work.

Some other notable early research vessels were HMS Beagle, RV Calypso, HMS Challenger, and the Endurance and Terra Nova.

== The race to the poles ==
=== 19th century ===
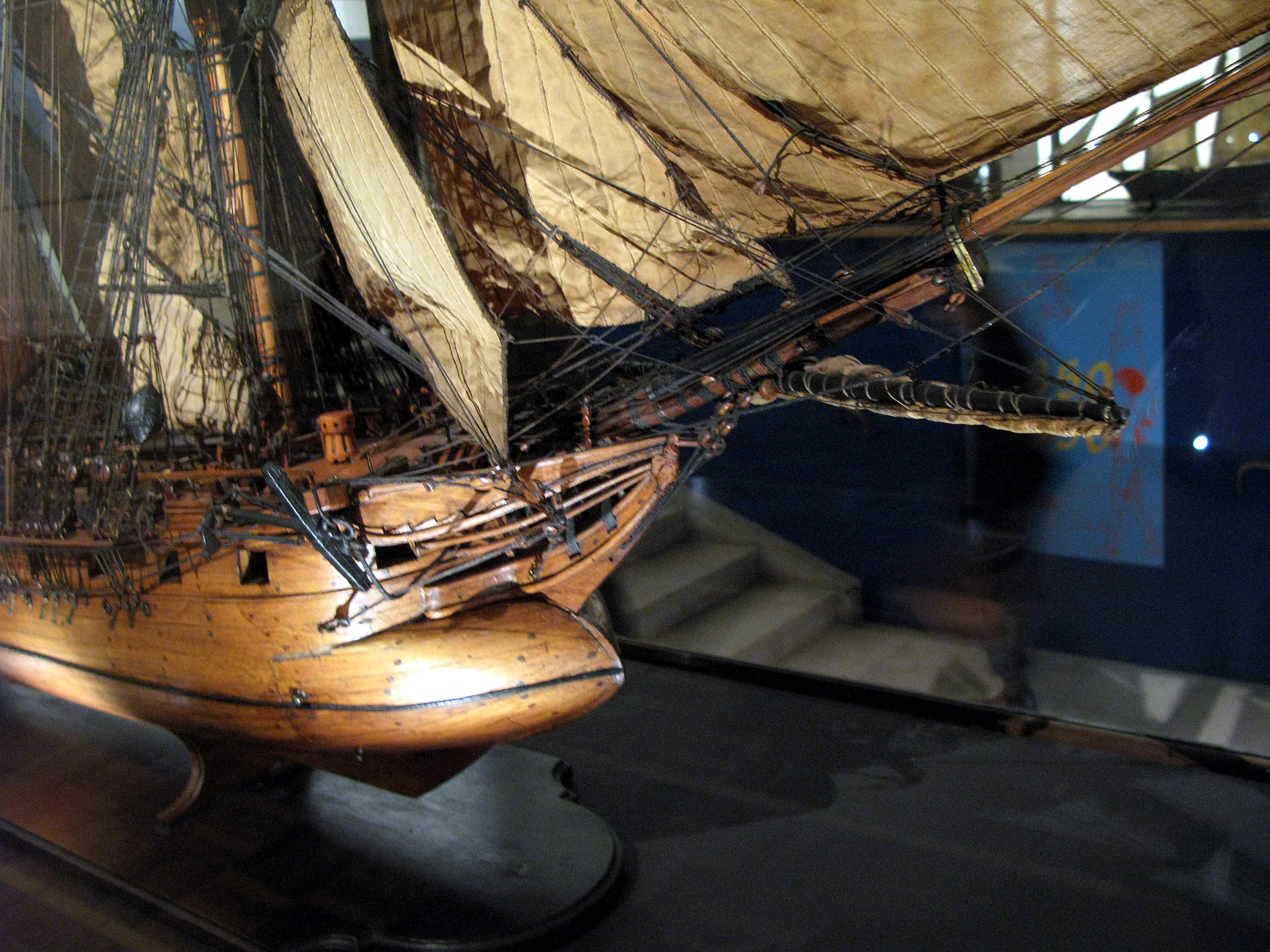
Late 18th-century French project for modification of a frigate for polar exploration. The ram-looking device is supposed to protect the ship from the pressure of the ice.

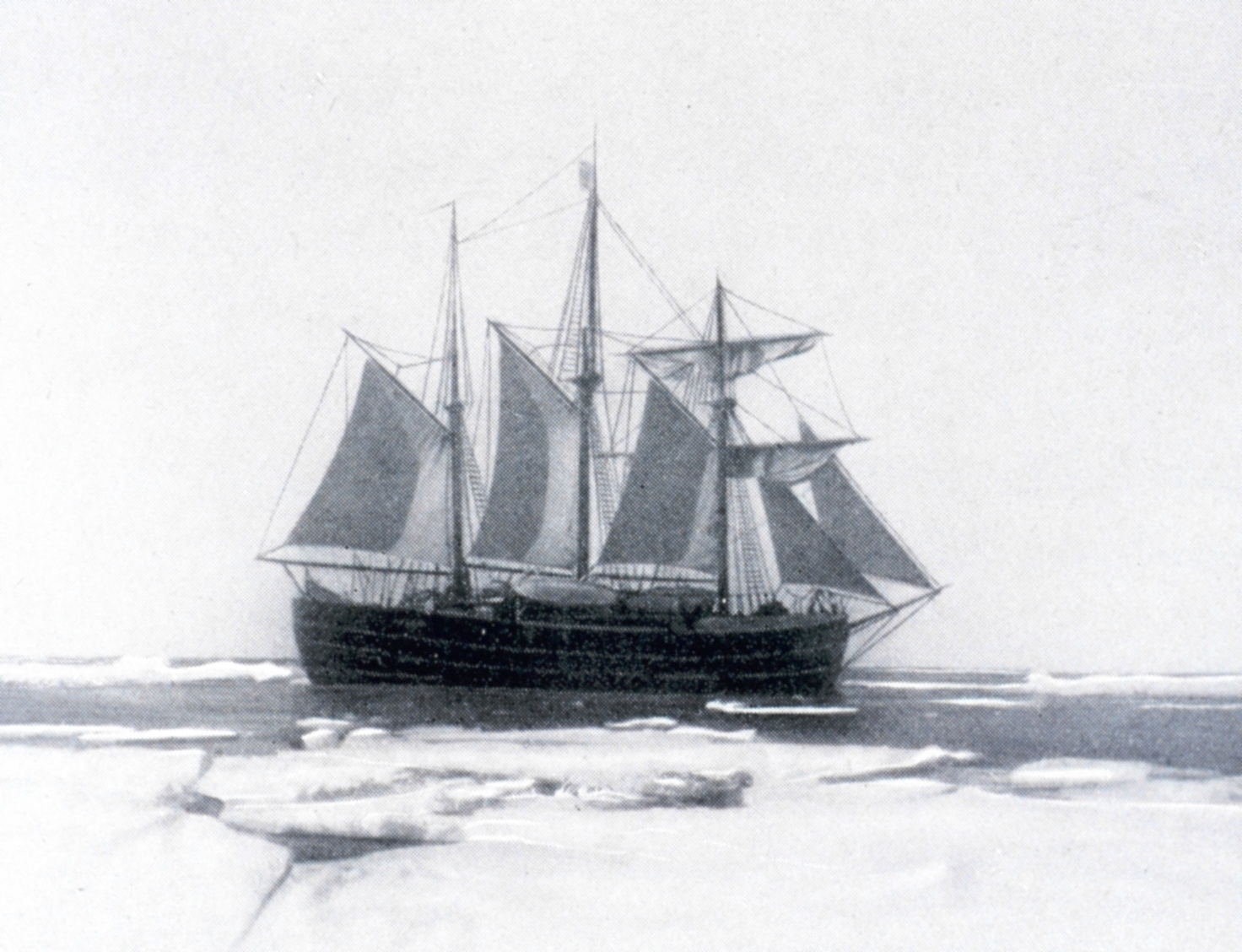
Fram in Antarctica in Roald Amundsen's expedition.

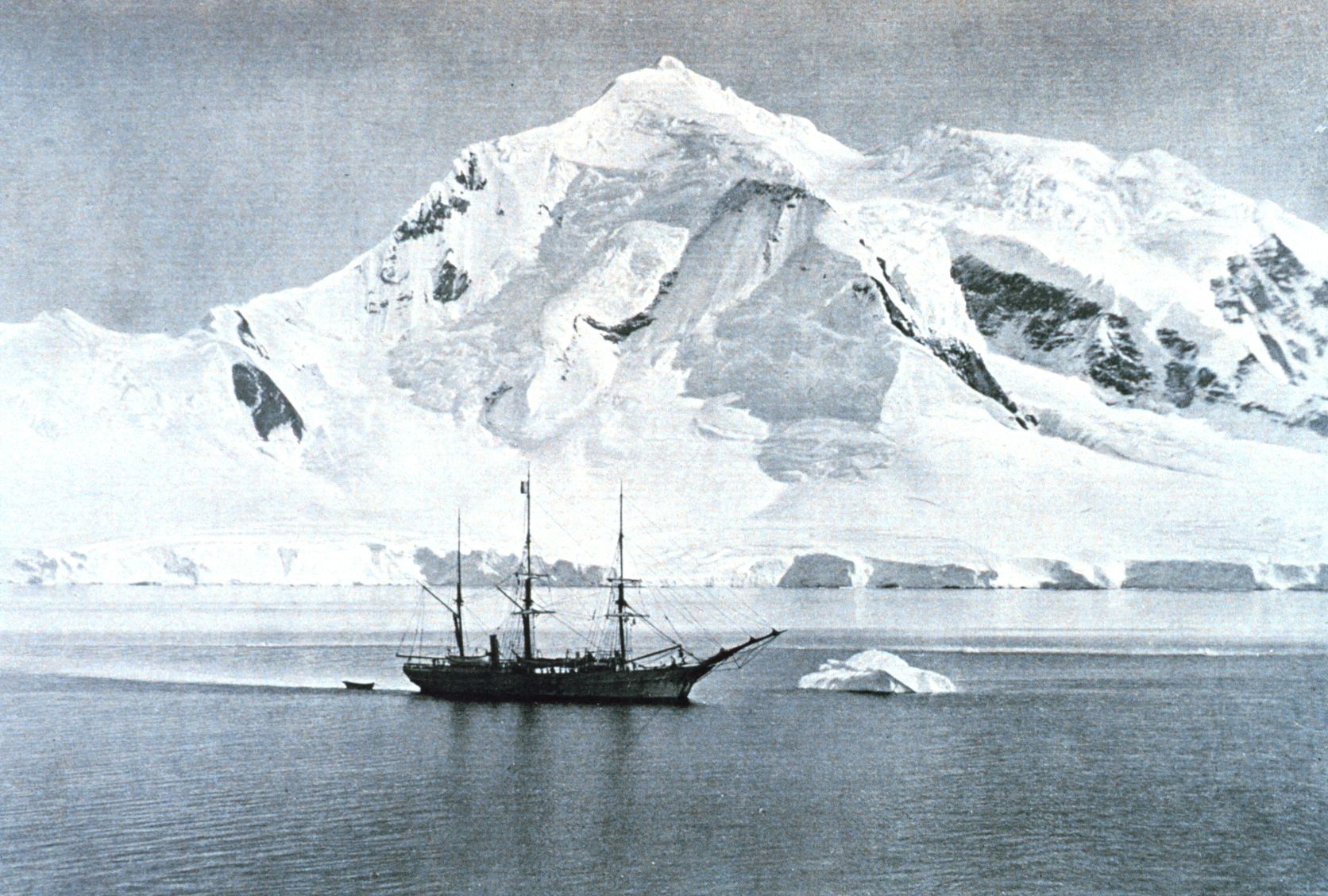
The Belgica anchored at Mount William.

At the end of the 19th century there was intense international interest in exploring the North and South Poles. The search operations for the lost Franklin expedition were barely forgotten as Russia, Great Britain, Germany and Sweden set new scientific tasks for the Arctic Ocean. In 1868, the Swedish ship Sofia carried out temperature measurements and oceanographic observation in the sea area around Svalbard. During this year the Greenland, built in Norway, operated in the same area under the German command of Carl Koldeway. In 1868 to 1869, the ship owner A. Rosenthal gave scientists the opportunity to come aboard on his whaling trips and by 1869, the ship Germania, which was escorted by the Hansa and led the Second German North Polar Expedition, was built. The Germania returned safely from the expedition and was used later for further research. The Hansa, in contrast, was crushed by the ice and sunk. In 1874, the Austrian-Hungarian Tegetthoff as well as the American schooner Polaris under the command of Captain Hull met the same fate.

The Royal Navy ships Alert and Discovery of the British Arctic Expedition of 1875-76 were more successful. In 1875 they left Portsmouth in order to cross the Arctic Ocean and reach as close as possible to the pole. Although they did not reach the pole itself they brought plenty of precious observations back. During these years, Adolf Erik Nordenskiöld's discovery of the Northeast Passage and first circumnavigation of Eurasia during the Vega expedition outstood all other expeditions. Fridtjof Nansen's famous Fram took deep-sea soundings and carried out hydrographical, meteorological and magnetic surveys throughout the polar basin. In 1884, a press item stating that the American Jeanette had sunk near the Siberian coast three years before inspired Fridtjof Nansen. The Captain of this ship, lieutenant George Washington de Long, assumed that currents existed floating ships deep into the polar ice.

Three years after the loss of the Jeanette and de Long's death, some items of equipment and few sou'wester pants were found on the southwestern Greenland coast. When Nansen heard about that there was only one possible explanation for him: These pieces had drifted surrounded by ice via the polar basin and along the East coast of Greenland until they ended up in Julianehab. The driftwood used by the Inuit was even more enlightening for Nansen. It could only derive from the areas of the Siberian rivers that flowed into the Arctic Ocean. This hazarded a guess that there was a current which floated from somewhere between the pole and Franz Josef Land through the Arctic Ocean to the East coast of Greenland. After that, Nansen planned to freeze a ship into ice and to let it float. Unlike other explorers, Nansen supposed that a well-constructed ship would take him to the North Pole safely. As a scientist, he wanted to reach the Pole as well as to reconnoiter the sea area.

The success of the expedition depended on the ship's construction, especially its resistance against ice pressure. Indeed, neither the Fram nor Nansen, who impatiently left his ship and ventured towards the pole on foot, achieved their goal but Nansen's theory about the currents was proved correct.

While Nansen was returning from the ice of the Arctic Ocean, his countryman Roald Amundsen set off to the Antarctic. Aboard the Belgica Amundsen accompanied the Belgian Antarctic Expedition as a steersman. For this adventure Adrien de Gerlache purchased the whale catcher Patria for 70,000 francs, overhauled the engine, arranged additional cabins, installed a laboratory and renamed the ship Belgica. Between 1887 and 1899, biological and physical observations were carried out to the west of the Antarctic Peninsula and to the south of Peter I Island. The Belgica was the first ship that overwintered in the Antarctic. An international research team was aboard; later at the evaluation over 80 scientists participated. In 1895 Georg Neumayer, director of the Hamburg naval observatory, launched the slogan "off to the South Pole" at the sixth international geographic congress. Last but not least, motivated by reports of the Norwegian Carsten Borchgrevink, who was the first person on the new continent, the congress declared the exploration of the Antarctica the urgent task for the following years.

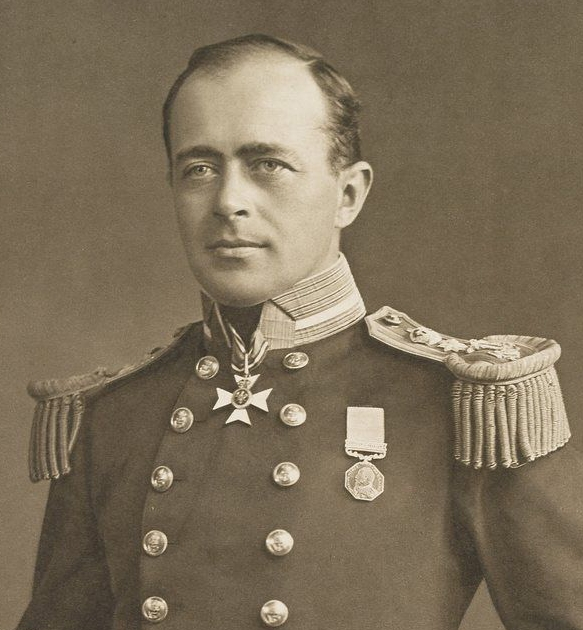
Robert Falcon Scott

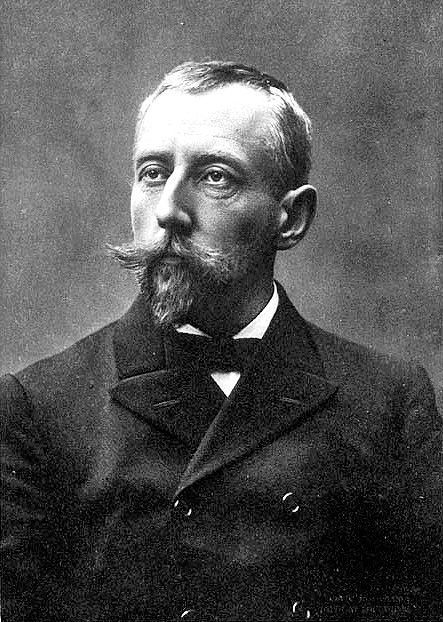
Roald Amundsen

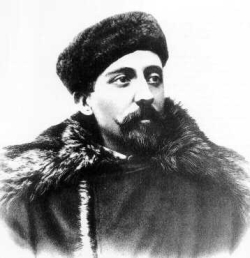
Adrien de Gerlache

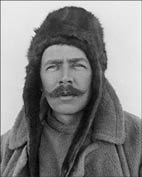
Carsten Borchgrevink

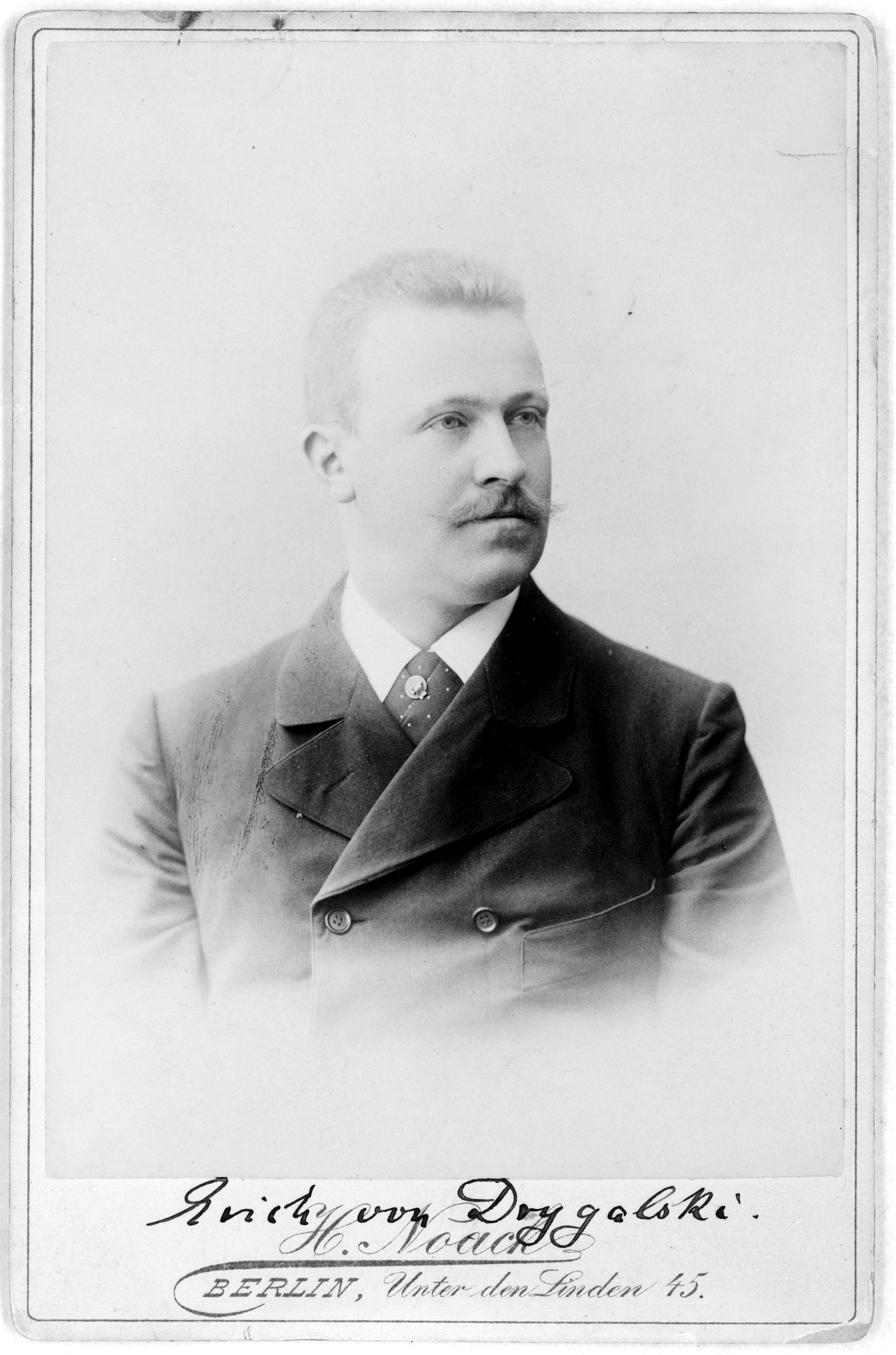
Erich von Drygalski

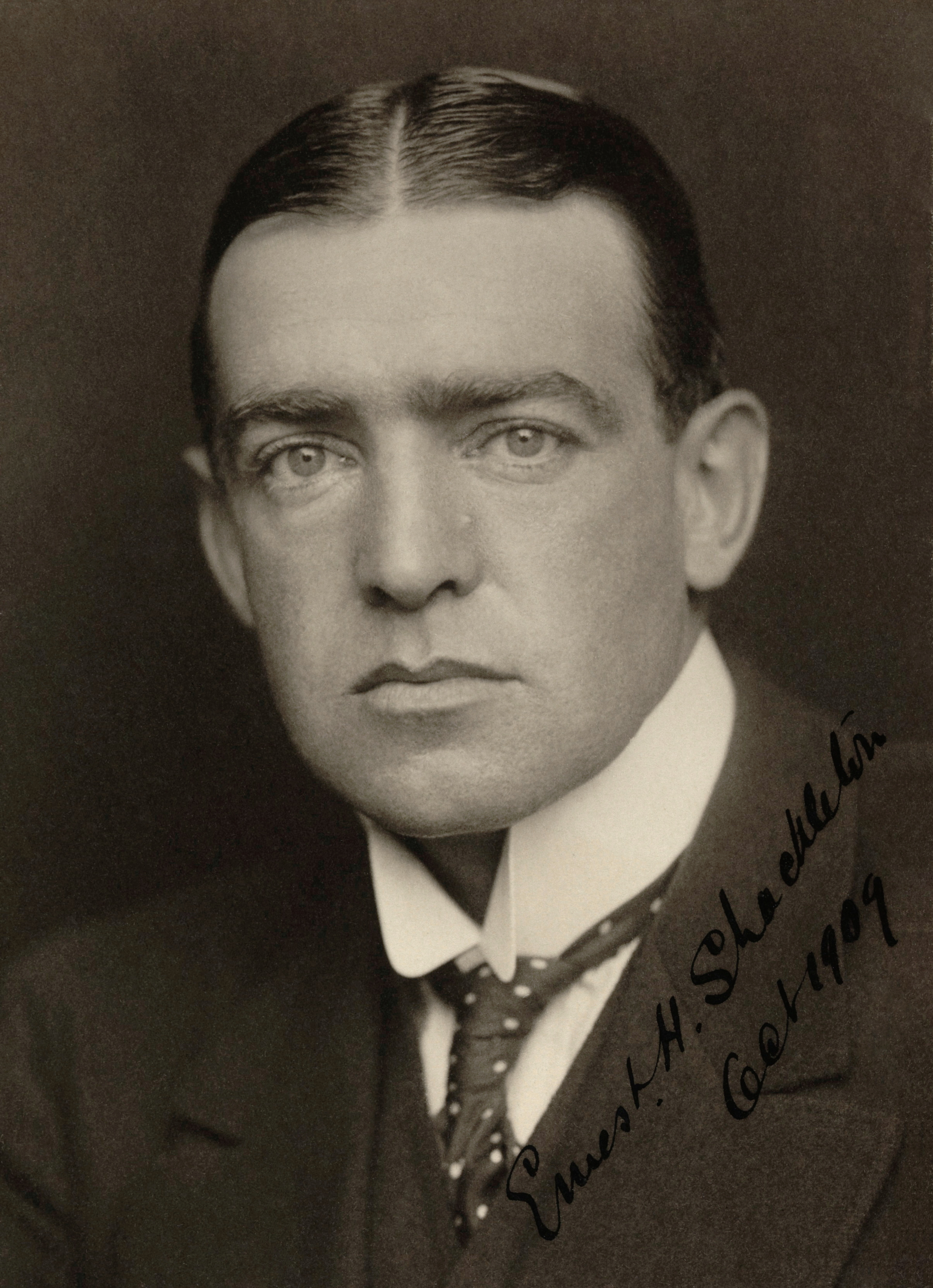
Ernest Shackleton

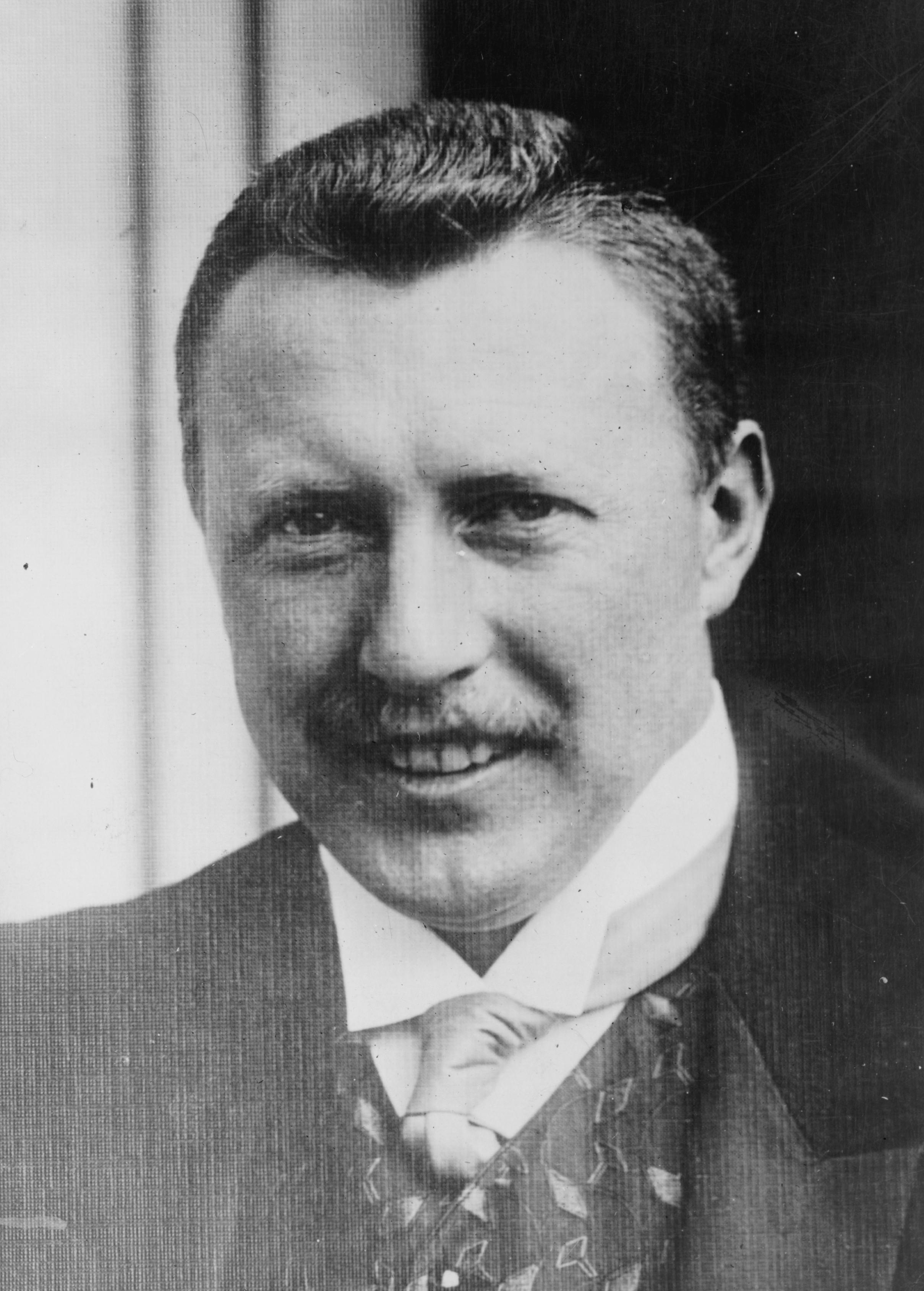
Wilhelm Filchner

=== 20th century ===
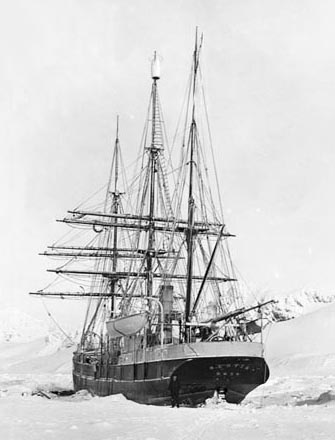
SNAE expedition ship Scotia, in the ice at Laurie Island, South Orkneys, 1903–04

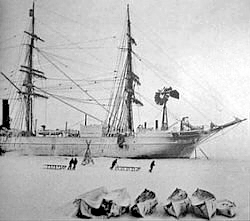
The Discovery in the Antarctic ice

While Borchgrevink, steering towards the Southern Cross, was on target for Antarctica, a German, Swedish and British expedition was prepared for the Southern Ocean. Germany built the expedition ship Gauss for 1.5 million marks at the Howaldtswerke in Kiel. On the model of the Fram, the Gauss, which weighed 1,442 tonnes (1,419 long tons) and was 46 meters (151 ft) long, had a round hulk in order to withstand the ice pressure. The Gauss had three masts and one auxiliary engine of 275 horsepower (205 kW). With a 60-strong crew, it could operate for almost three years without any help. From 1901 until 1903, Erich von Drygalski led the German Antarctic expedition and carried out extensive studies mainly in the southern part of the Indian Ocean. The Swedish expedition under the command of Otto Nordenskjöld used the old Antarctic weighing only 353 tonnes, which had already been used by Borchgrevink in 1895. The expedition intending to overwinter at the Antarctic Peninsula was ill-starred from the beginning. In 1902, the Antarctic sank. Fortunately, the Argentine gunboat Uruguay rescued all crewmembers. Also Great Britain prompted Dundee Shipbuilders to build a ship for Robert Falcon Scott's expedition. The Discovery weighed 1620 tonnes, was 52 meters (171 ft) long and had an auxiliary motor of 450 horsepower. Nevertheless, during the research the ship froze in. Only the relief ship Morning, sent by the British Admiralty, was able to free the Discovery and with Terra Nova escorted the Discovery back home. The reunion with the Antarctic ice was undertaken by a Scottish expedition led by the naturalist William Speirs Bruce. Bruce had worked with the whale catchers Balaena and Active in the Southern Ocean in 1892 to 1893. He hoped that he could acquire the field-tested Balaena but found the ship too expensive, buying instead the Norwegian whale catcher Hekla for £2,620, a ship that had sailed under the Danish flag along Greenland's coast in 1891 and 1892. For another £8,000 he had the ship repaired and provided it with a new engine. Under the new name Scotia, this ship completed its way into the Southern Ocean and was very successful thanks to dredging and trawl catches at great depth in the Weddell Sea and off the coast.

At that point the French vessel Français, a 32-meter (105 ft) three-master arrived at the Antarctic horizon. The French doctor and naturalist Jean-Baptiste Charcot was aboard. After his return from the ice he sold the Français but was not able to forget the Antarctic. In 1908 he purchased another three-master, the Pourquoi Pas, with which he worked successfully in the Southern Ocean. Later the northern polar waters sparked the Frenchman's interest and in 1928 he participated in the rescue mission for Amundsen.

Sir Ernest Shackleton, a member of the "Discovery-Expedition" of 1901, returned with the forty-year-old Nimrod back into the Antarctic in order to march to the South Pole but had to give up just 180 km before his goal. Shackleton had at first tried to purchase the whale catcher Bjørn built at the Risør shipyard in Lindstøl. Since he couldn't raise the wind, he conceded this ship to Wilhelm Filchner's second German Antarctic expedition. Filchner refurbished the ship at the Blohm & Voss dockyard and renamed it Deutschland. There was enough room for thirty-four crewmembers, while single cabins were available for scientists and mates. In addition, a geologist, a meteorologist, an oceanographer and a zoologist shared a laboratory. The expedition, which visited the Southern Ocean between 1911 and 1912, made substantial contributions about the physical and chemical conditions in the western part of the southern Atlantic Ocean and the Weddell Sea. The Japanese first arrived in the Southern Ocean in 1911. Ensign Nobu Shirase explored with the Kainan Maru the eastern part of the Ross Ice Shelf. The years between 1910 until 1912 were characterized by the "great race" of Amundsen and Scott. While Scott travelled in the twenty-six-year-old Terra Nova, which had escorted him out of the ice in 1903, Roald Amundsen borrowed the reliable Fram for his South Pole expedition. During the dramatic race, Australia unobtrusively sent its first expedition ship, the Aurora, into the Antarctic under Douglas Mawson. An air-tractor, the first airplane in the region, was aboard but it proved to be useless. The failed attempt to cross Antarctica, for which Shackleton used the Endurance and Mawson's Aurora, was one of the last Antarctic expeditions before the outbreak of the First World War.

== Between the world wars ==
After the war, Shackleton was one of the first to reengage in polar exploration. For a new Arctic expedition, he bought the Foca I which was designed in Norway and specified for polar areas. Organizational difficulties were encountered and Shackleton needed to change his plans and set course for the Southern Ocean. He did not complete the journey but died on the Quest at the beginning of his trip. His longtime comrade-in-arms Frank Wild assumed the leadership and advanced as far as the South Sandwich Islands until pack ice induced him to turn around and make for home. Later, the ship resumed its original role as a sealer. In 1930 to 1931 H. G. Watkins deployed the Quest for the British Air Route expedition, surveyed the eastern coast of Greenland in search of a site for an air base. The winner of the race, Roald Amundsen, made his way to the Arctic Ocean, his actual field of interest. In the following years between 1918 and 1922, he attempted to repeat Nansen's enterprise without success.

After the First World War interrupted oceanographic research, international scientific activities started anew in 1920. The invention of the echo sounder in 1912 reached a new significance for the international marine research. Henceforth, it was possible to measure the distance to the seabed by sending acoustic signals instead of using wires and weights. Warships used echo sounders during the First World War. In 1922, the American destroyer Stewart took the first echo profile over the North Atlantic and one year later, the sonic logging between San Francisco and San Diego was published. Between 1929 and 1934 the USS Ramapo took about thirty profiles of the northern Pacific Ocean. In 1927, the German cruiser Emden was able to carry out a series of soundings of the ocean trench to the east of the Philippines.

The German ship Meteor was the first to use the echo sounder for scientific purposes in the 1920s on the German Meteor expedition. For the first time an ocean, the Atlantic, was systematically mapped. The Meteor crossed the South Atlantic from the ice line to 20° N on fourteen mapping ways. With 67,000 echo soundings, cartographers were able to produce a modern depth chart. Other geomagnetic and oceanographic mapping expeditions followed e.g. the American research ship Carnegie in the Pacific Ocean from 1928 to 1929, the detailed reconnaissance in Indonesia by the Dutch Willebrord Snellius, the exploration of the waters around the Antarctic by the British William Scoresby and Discovery II and the expedition of the American schooner Atlantis that sailed from the West Atlantic to the Gulf of Mexico between 1932 and 1938. Also the Scandinavian countries continued their activities at the end of the 1920s. Danish scientists devoted themselves to research in marine biology. The oceanographic Dana Expedition, led by Johannes Schmidt and financed by the Carlsberg Foundation, was the most important Danish marine expedition. The treasured fish and plankton species belonged to the greatest collection of that time. The deceased John Murray had made a will stating that his invested inheritance would be used for an expedition as soon as enough capital would be accumulated. In 1931 was this the case and John Challenger Murray set work on realizing his father's wish. Since the envisaged research ships William Scoresby, Dana and George Bligh were inapplicable or unavailable respectively, the offer of the Egyptian government to take the "Mabahiss" was accepted. The Mabahiss left Alexandria on September 3, 1933, and returned on Mai 25, 1934. During this period she covered the Red Sea, Bay of Biscay, Indian Ocean, and the Gulf of Oman—more than 22,000 nautical miles (41,000 km) whereas chemical, physical and biological assays were taken. The scientific leadership ran Seymour Sewell. In total, three British and two Egyptian scientists participated in this journey.

In 1923, Japan sent the Manchiu Maru in the Indian and Pacific Ocean, and since 1927 the ships Shunpo Maru and Soyo Maru were on their way. From 1930 on the Shintoku Maru made annual trips to the Pacific Ocean for assays of the seawater.

Eight years later, a new phase of the marine research began. As so far, the marine research continued but from now, different countries worked together on one expedition. The German Altair and the Norwegian Armauer Hansen performed a common measurement program within the scope of the international Gulf Stream expedition that shed light on the fluctuation of the Gulf Stream. For this international experiment the German Meteor, the Danish Dana, and the French air-base vessel Carimare delivered data. In the same year, unconventional ships began with marine research.

Two flying boats, the Boreas and the Passat, equipped with aerial photography equipment were on board the catapult ship Schwabenland during the Third German Antarctic Expedition. The application of this technology over Antarctica was revolutionary. Stereo photography was used. On the way back to Europe, the ship conducted oceanographic, biological and meteorological observations and every fifteen to thirty minutes echo soundings were taken.

The oceanographic researches during World War II were principally aligned with military questions. The study of underwater acoustic, which was significant for positioning submarines, and the study of waves and surf, which was important for the amphibious task force, dominated the marine research.

== The postwar period ==
Albeit the big seafaring nations enlarged the postwar marine research, especially the United States strongly reengaged, other expeditions of two smaller countries were vitally important. The Swedish "Albatross" expedition of 1947/48 crossed eighteen times the equator and covered 45,000 nautical miles (83,000 km). Over 200 cores, fastened on a perpendicular, were dragged 1.5 km over the seabed. The second Danish "Galathea" expedition from 1950 to 1951 headed by Anton Bruun concentrated on studies of the life in the deep sea and succeeded in catching live animals from the bottom of the Philippine Trench at a depth of 10,190 m (33,430 ft), proving that life can exist in the deepest parts of the ocean. Another significant find of the expedition was the discovery of a "living fossil", the monoplacophoran Neopilina galathea, dredged from the bottom of the Mexican Gulf.

Already in the 1930s, American scientist began to use seismic measuring methods in flat waters and during the war, physicist Maurice Ewing carried the first seismic refraction measurements out. The introduction of this geophysical method as well as palaeomagnetic researches (studying the Earth's magnetic field preserved in magnetic iron-bearing minerals), led to a reinvigoration of Alfred Wegener's continental drift theory and subsequent development of plate tectonics.

After the Second World War, the number of missions escalated worldwide as one can read in the Newsletters of Cooperative Investigations of the Mediterranean from Monaco. For the period from 1950 to 1960, 110 expeditions are displayed for the Mediterranean area.

=== Increasing collaboration ===
At the beginning of the 1950s, a rethinking of the marine research set in and the international close work between several ships was remarkable. In line with the NOPAC enterprise, Canadian, American ships (Hugh M. Smith, Brown Bear, Ste. Teherse, Horizon, Black Douglas, Stranger, Spencer F. Baird) and the Japanese vessels (Oshoro Maru, Tenyo Maru, Kagoshima Maru, Satsuma, Umitaka Maru) took part in this endeavor.

On a grand scale, common international research programs got its way during the international geophysical year (IGY) of 1957/58. For the exploration of deep-sea circulation and strong sea currents, sixty research ships out of forty nations were deployed. In cooperation of the research ships Crawford, Atlantis, Discovery II, Chain and the Argentine sounding vessel Capitan Canepa, fifteen profiles at intervals of eight latitudes between 48° N and 48° S were taken.

Furthermore, twenty ships of twelve nations took part in the Cold Wall enterprise, which was another program of the IGY. The research was focused on the Cold Wall, which separates the warm, high-salt Gulf Stream and the cold, low-salt water masses of polar origin and stretches northwestwards from the Newfoundland banks to the Norwegian Sea. Later on, Germany also participated in the program with the Antorn Dohrn and the Gauss. This was Germany's first participation after World War II. For the first time, the Soviet Union, which had a fleet of twenty research ships and one research dive station, took part in an international project during the IGY. Moreover, the USSR commissioned the research ships Vityaz (5700 t) and Michail Lomonosov (6000 t) and the icebreaker Ob. The IGY marked the beginning of a new exploration phase in the marine research characterized by international cooperation and synoptic researches.

With the "Overflow" program, scientists tried to reconnoiter the overflow of the cold Arctic ground water over the submarine ridge between Iceland and the Faroe Islands. Nine research ships of five European countries took a stake in. This program was repeated at a larger scale: thirteen research ships of seven countries were on its way. Denmark appointed the Dana and the Jens Christian Svabo, Iceland the Bjarni Sæmundson, Canada the Hudson, Norway the Helland Hansen, USSR the Boris Davydov and the Professor Zubov, Great Britain the Challenger, the Shackleton and the Explorer, West Germany the Meteor, the Walther Herwig, and the Meerkatze II.

=== Tropical meteorology ===
Between the years 1959 and 1965, forty research ships of 23 countries assayed the Indian Ocean together. This ocean, having an exceptional position because of the monsoons and being surrounded by developing countries, was the least known sea area. The abutters should have gotten an opportunity to start their own sea and fishing research programs. In 1958 the prelude was formed by the American ship Vema, other ships joined in between 1959 and 1960: Diamantina (Australia), Commandant Robert Giraud (France), Vitjaz (USSR), Argo, Requisite (USA) and the Umitaka Maru. West Germany followed with its Meteor in 1964/64.

In the course of the longtime Global Atmospheric Research Programme (GARP), the World Meteorological Organization (WMO) called for a global weather experiment by which the entire atmosphere and the ocean surface are supposed to be observed for the first time. More than fifty ships worked in the equatorial areas around the globe and collected oceanographic and meteorological measured data for an "inventory of the world weather". Especially the continuation of the works and questions became the most important task for the next years and decades.

Besides these big international programs, the number of projects carried out by two or three countries increased. With increasing political and economical pressure, which resulted from increasing raw material supply, more and more countries participated in marine research.

=== Chinese research ships ===
In the years between 1964 and 1975, China built forty research ships, including the Practice (1965) with a displacement of 3,167 tonnes (3,117 long tons), and the Xiang Yang Hong 5 (1972) (10,000 tonnes or 9.840 tons), which was China's first multipurpose research ship. After 1976, the situation for Chinese marine researchers improved and in 1984 Liu Zhengang from the national bureau for oceanography reported at a scientific Congress that at first research ships had been created by remodeling fishing boats, freighters or discarded ships of the navy. A typical ship had been the Jinxing during that time of 1969. In the 1970s, China had begun to build new ships such as the 10,000 t multipurpose ship Xiang Yang Hong 10. To cover the needed demands for oil discoveries, several geophysical ships had been built in China and in foreign countries. Since the development had continued, great importance had been attached to keep the ships on a well-equipped and technical level.

According to Zhengang's statement, the research fleet had consisted of 165 units with 150,000 tonnes altogether. Thereunder had been more than fifty ships with a tonnage of 5,000, twenty-two ships with a tonnage from 1,000 to 5,000, twenty ships with a tonnage between 500 and 1,000 and only fifty ships had had less than 50. Primarily, these ships had been run by the national bureau for oceanography, department of oil, department of agriculture and by universities. During the southern summer of 1984/1985, the Xiang Yang Hong 10 and the J 121 had been the first Chinese research ships which had sailed to the Antarctic in order to build the research station "Great Wall". China had caught up with the marine research works of the 1970s and 1980s and had tried to get a voice in the future of Antarctica.

== Autonomous Vessels ==
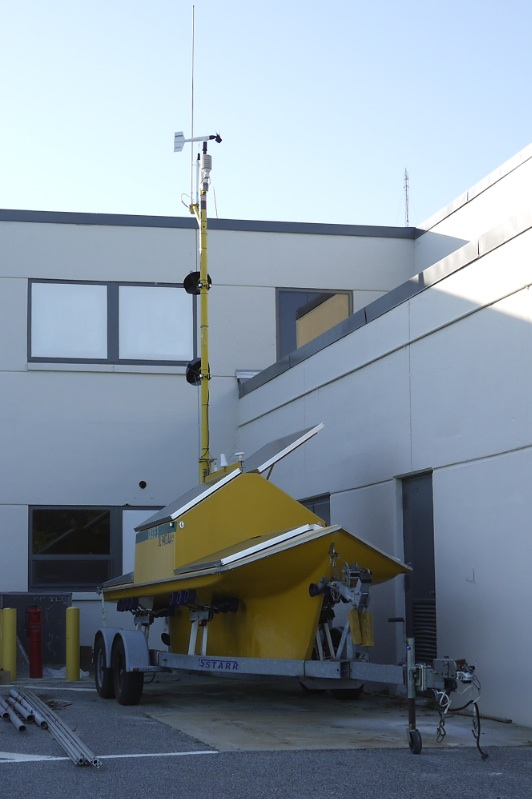
Autonomous oceanographic research vessel

Mechanically and hydrodynamically, autonomous research platforms are similar to towed sonar "fish" and ROVs. Operationally, however, known autonomous vehicles were initially limited to rivers, lakes, and bays due to navigation and collision-avoidance issues. Thus, progress in surface vessels lagged behind both unmanned aerial vehicles and submarine-types, due to their simpler operating conditions. Nevertheless, advances in navigation, machine vision and other sensors, and processing have spread ASVs from highly advanced models to the undergraduate level.

== See also ==
- Research vessel
- Heroic Age of Antarctic Exploration
- List of Arctic expeditions
- List of Antarctic expeditions
